= Military ranks of Saudi Arabia =

The Military ranks of Saudi Arabia are the military insignia used by the Military Forces of Saudi Arabia. The ranks are influenced by both the United Kingdom and later the United States, due to the close relations during the development phase of the Saudi military.

== Commissioned officer ranks ==
The rank insignia of commissioned officers.

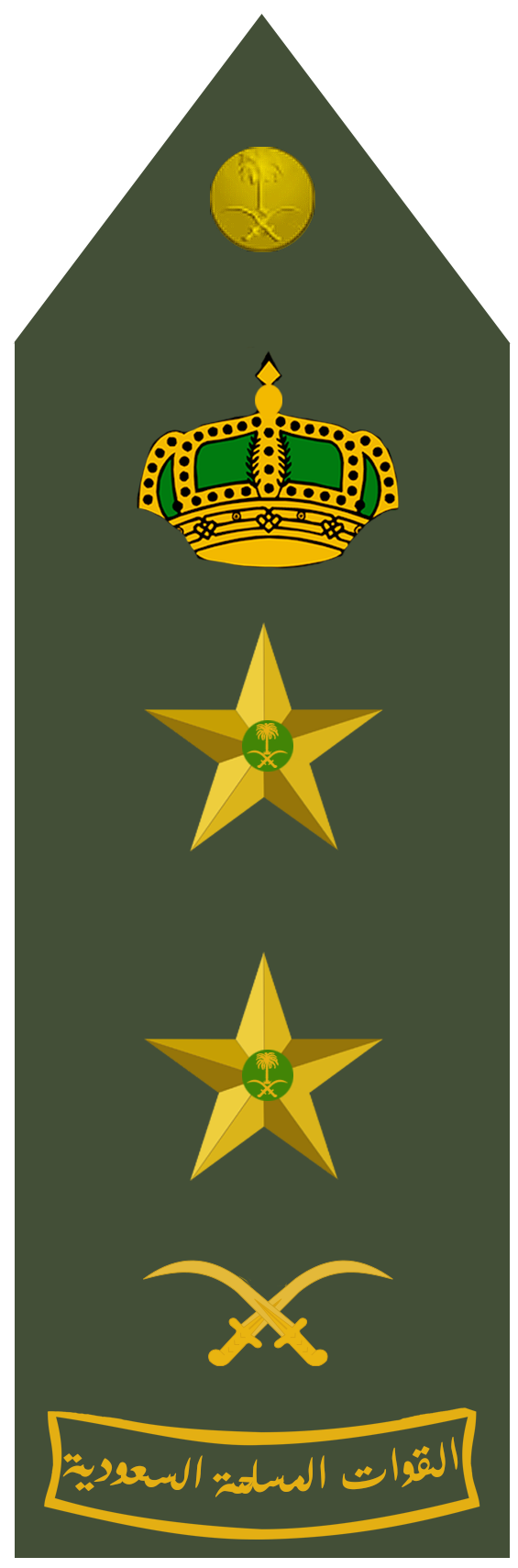
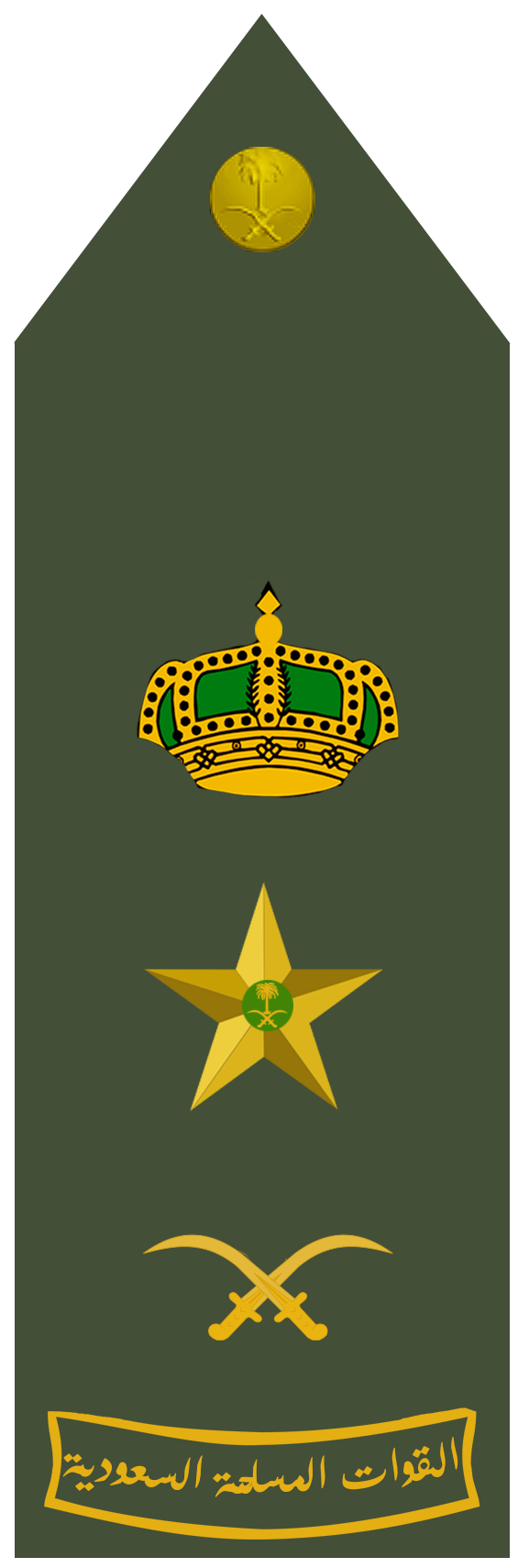
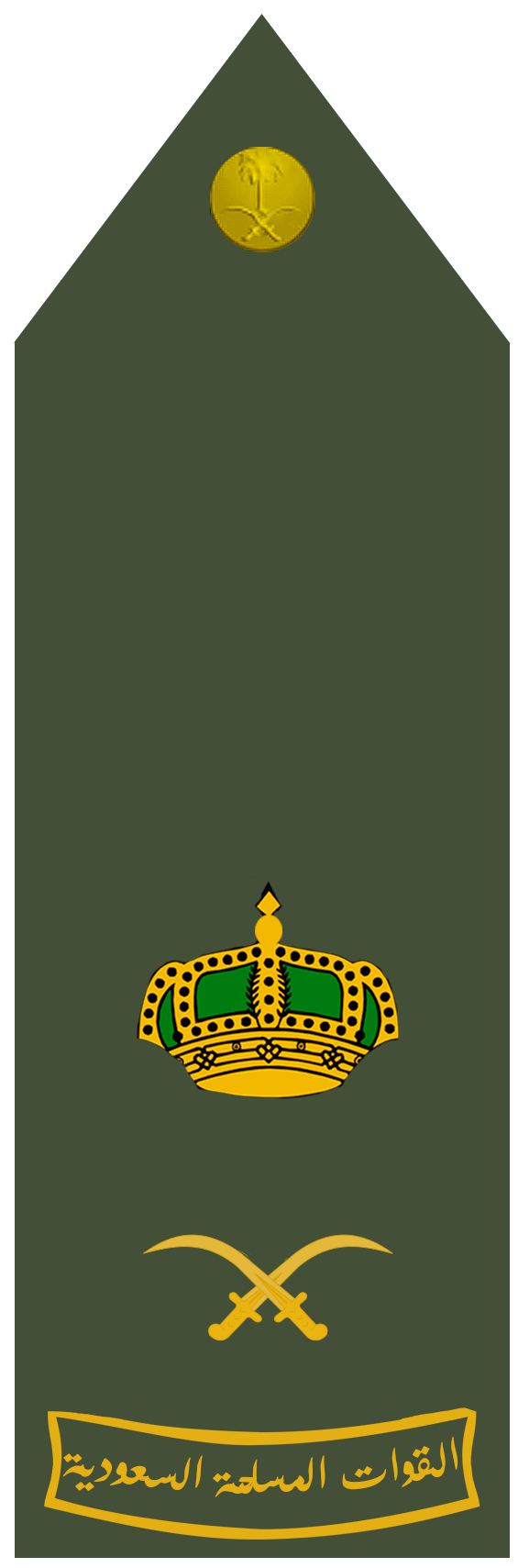
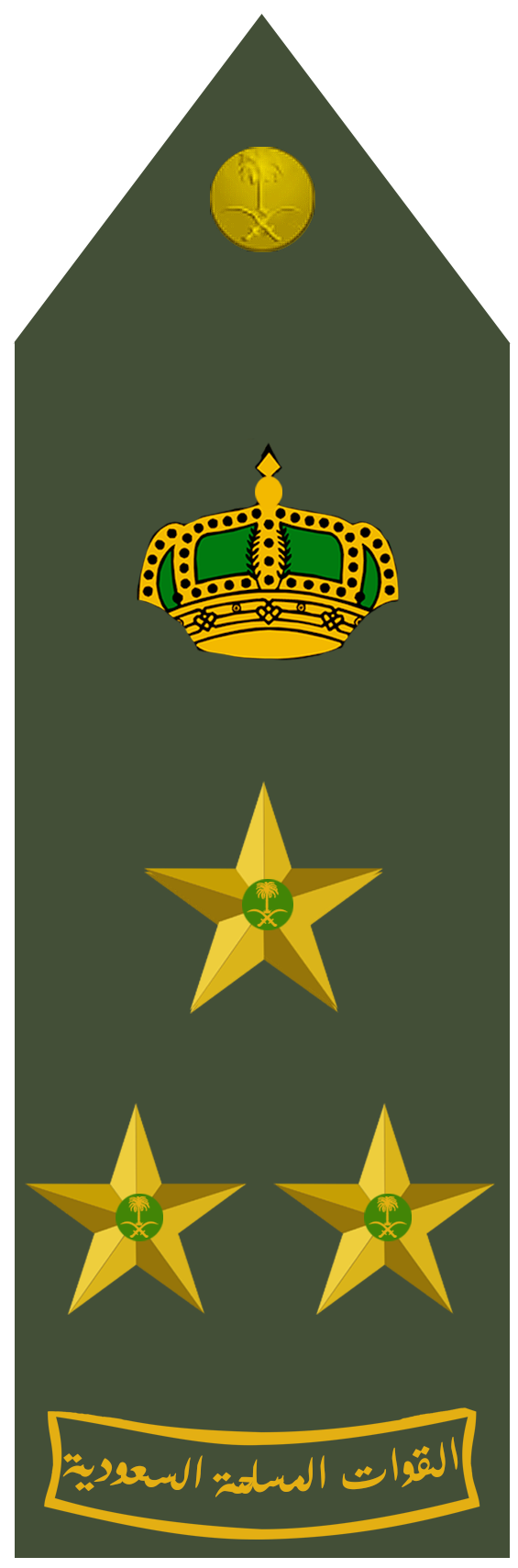
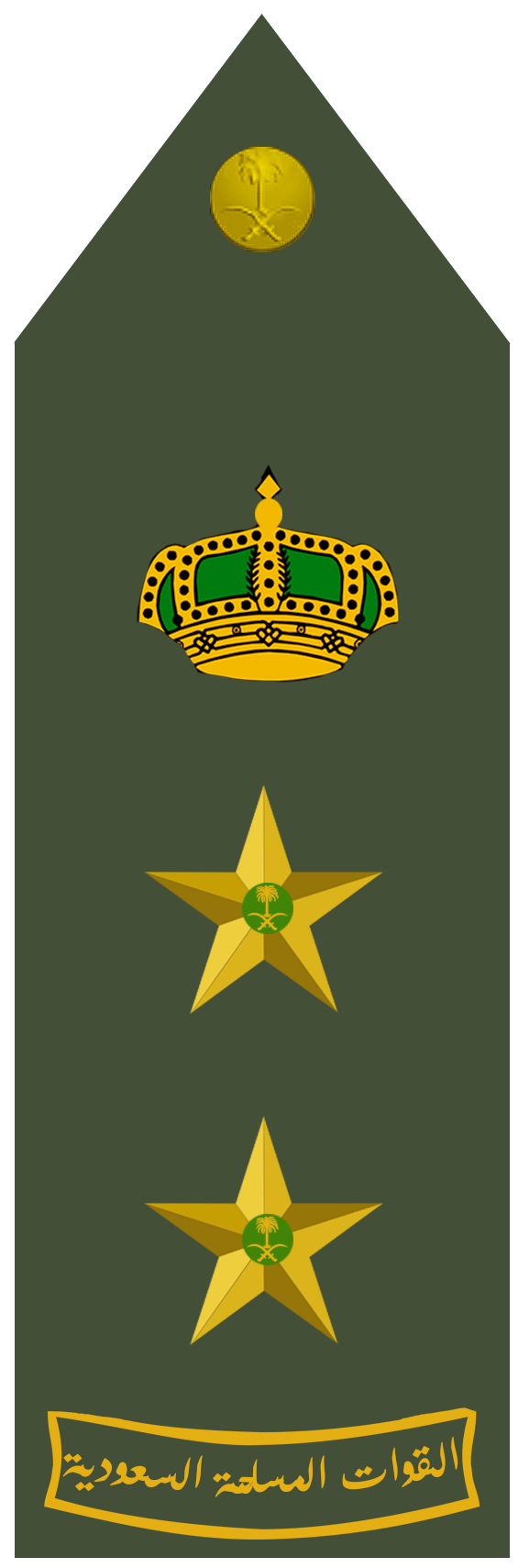
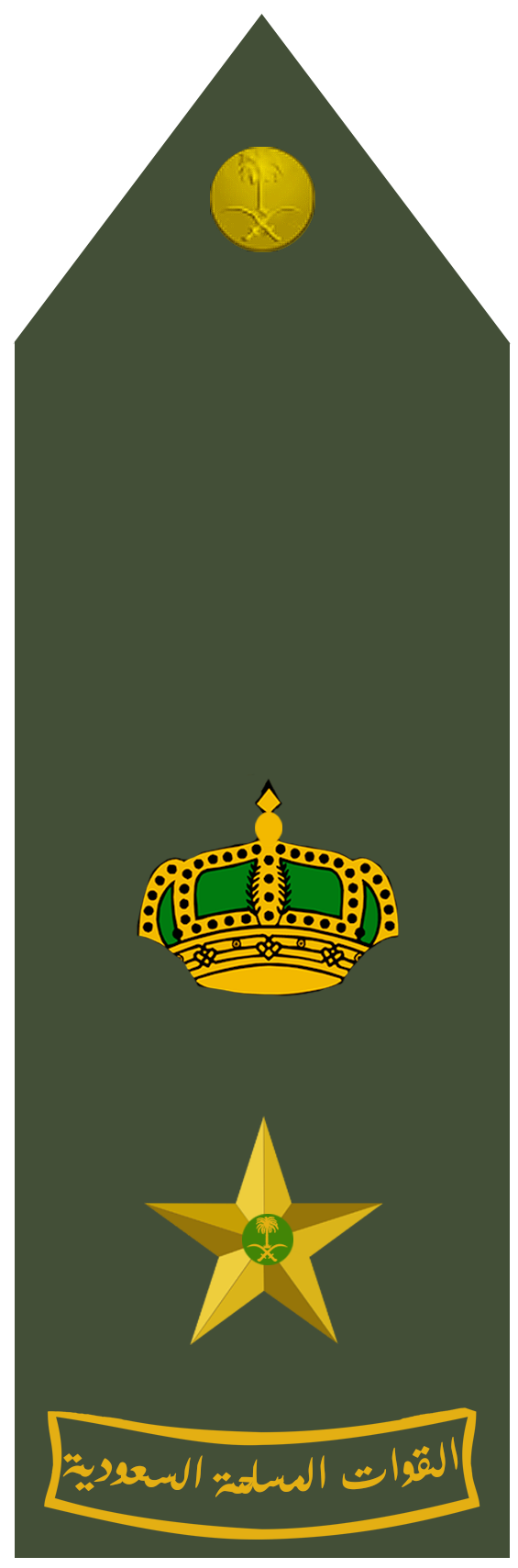
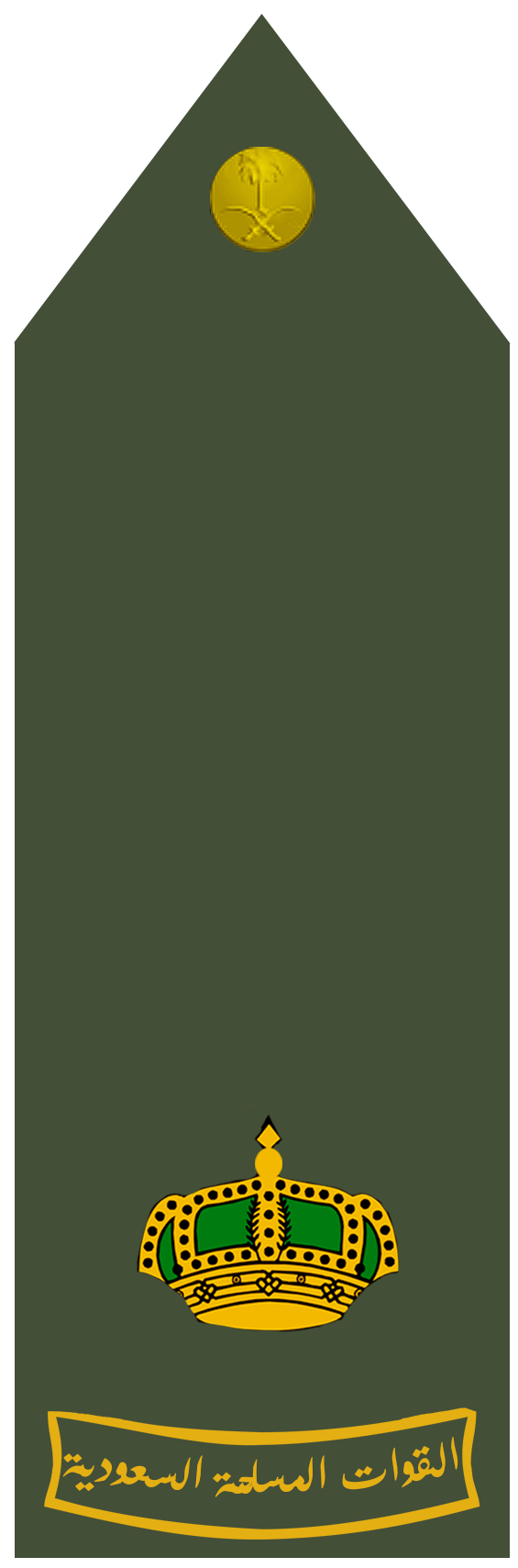
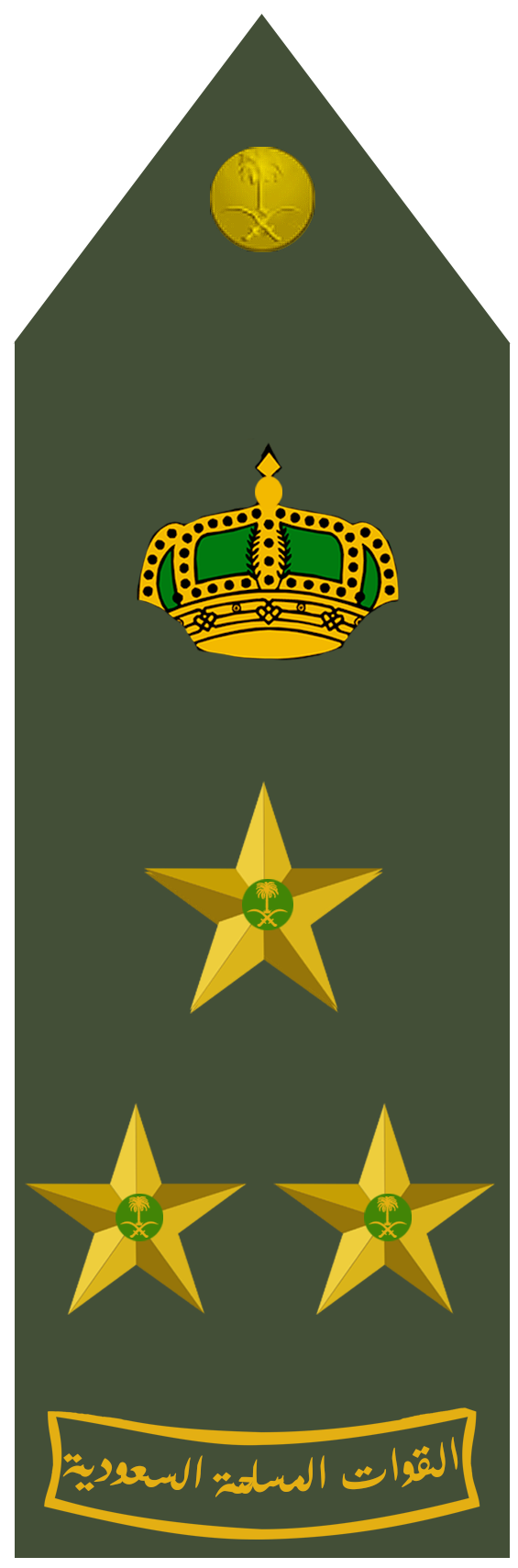
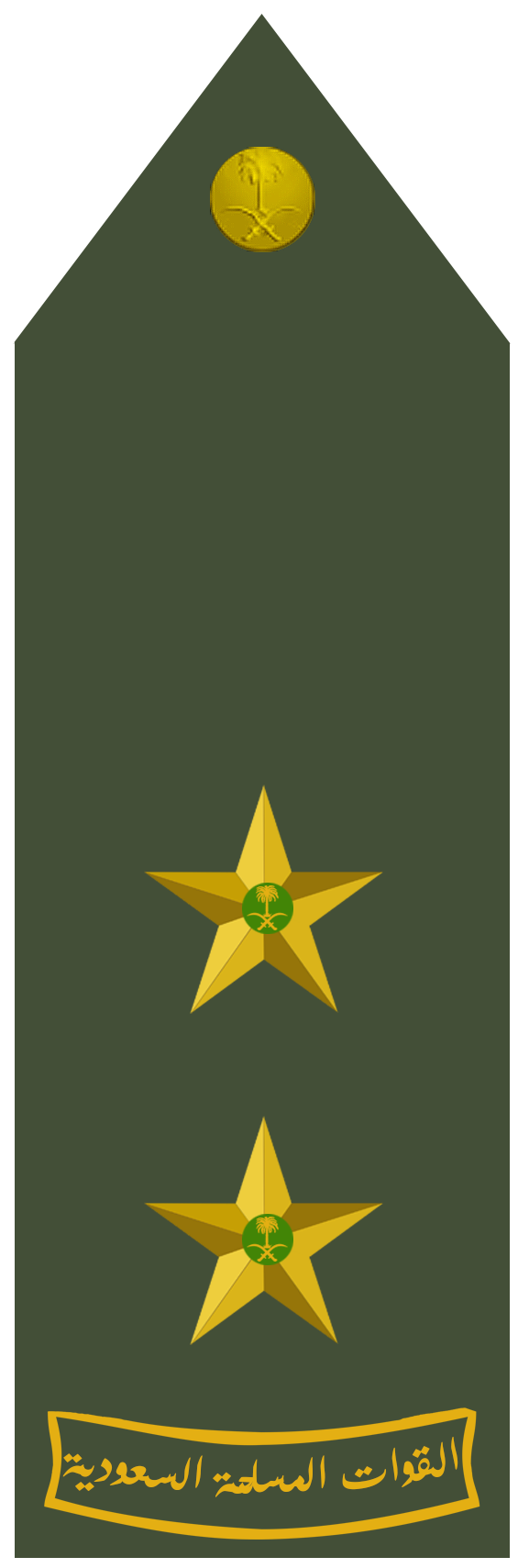
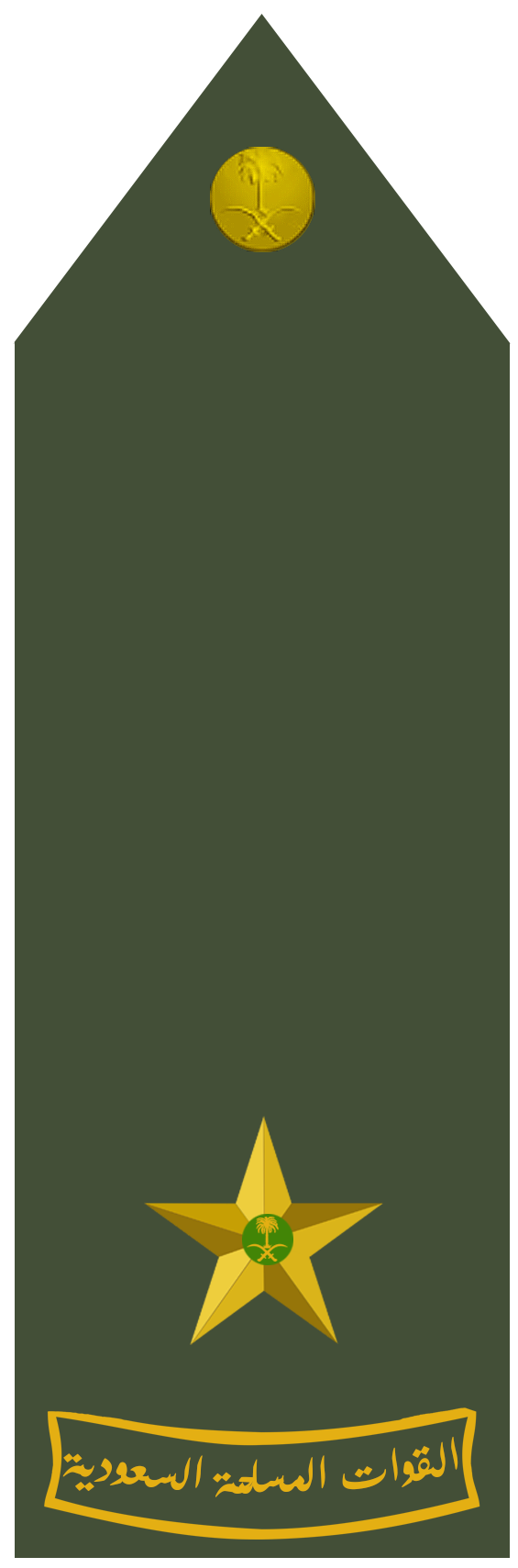
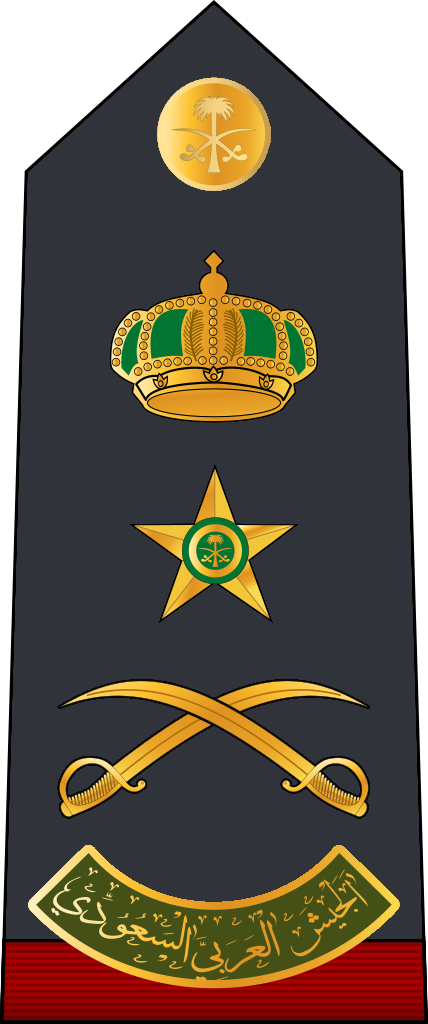
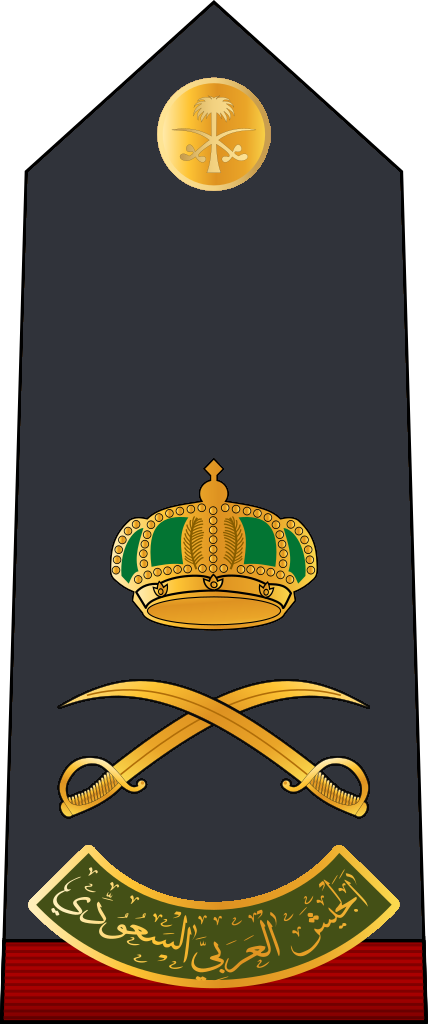
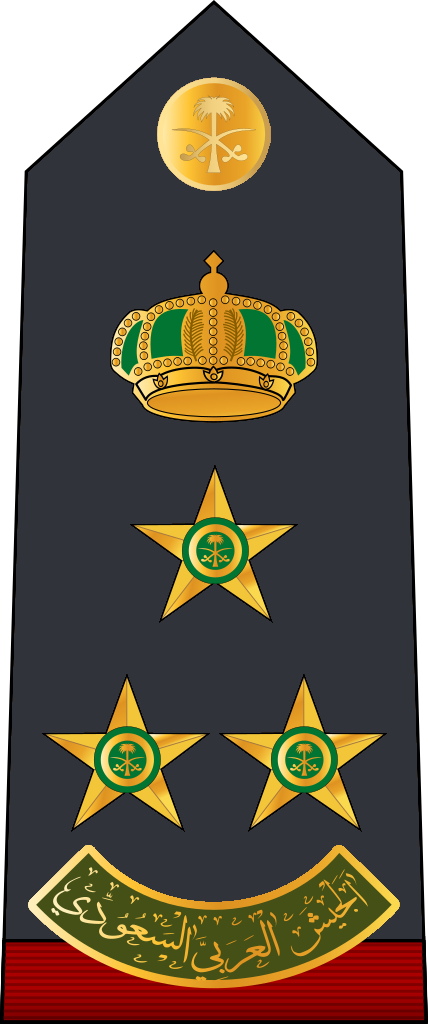
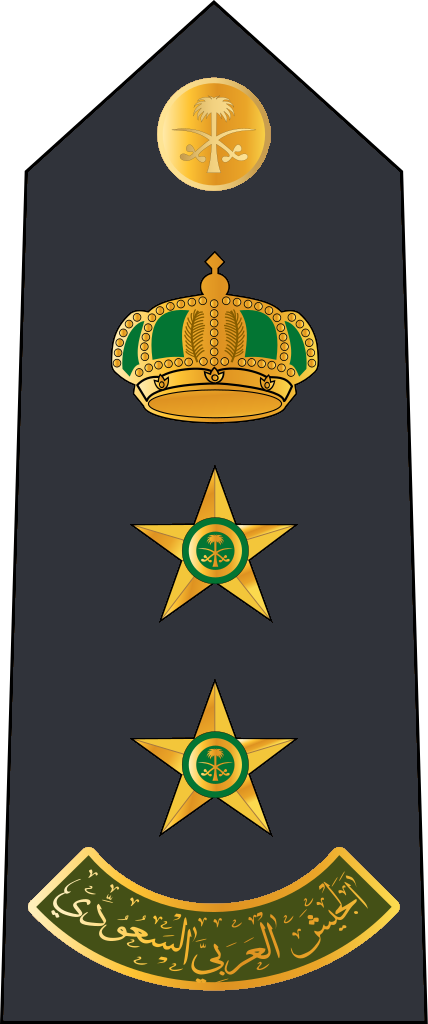
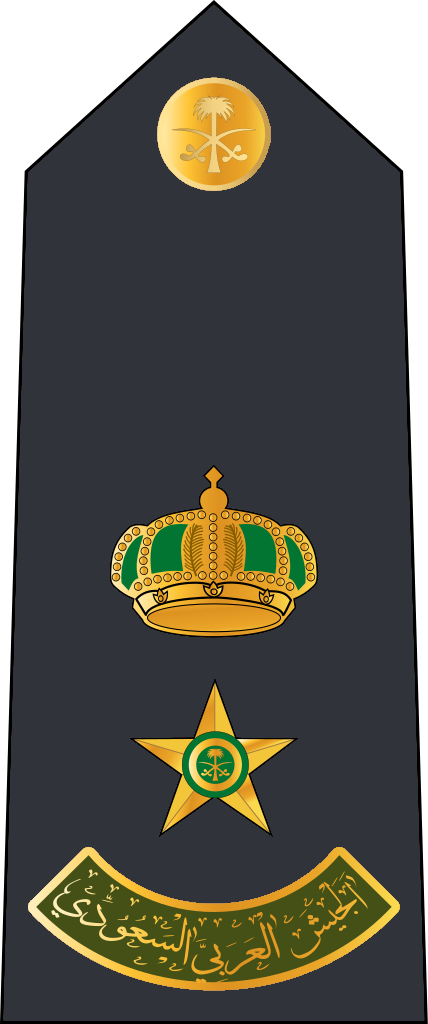
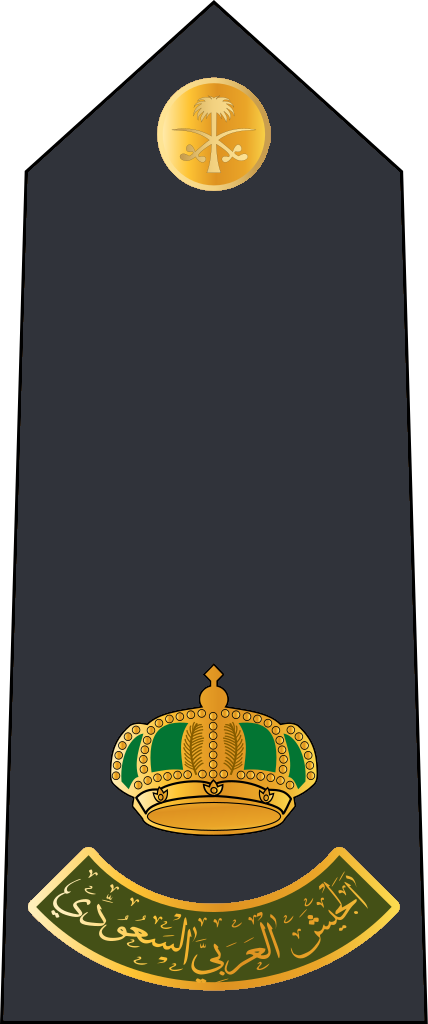
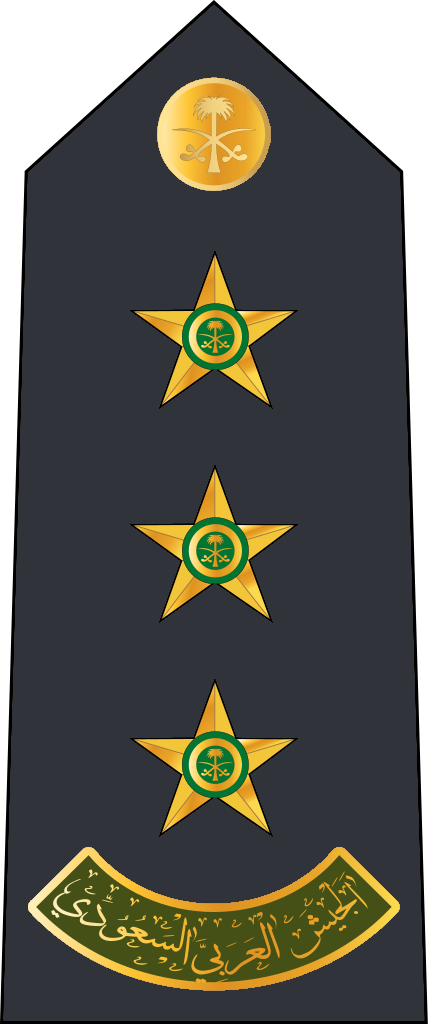
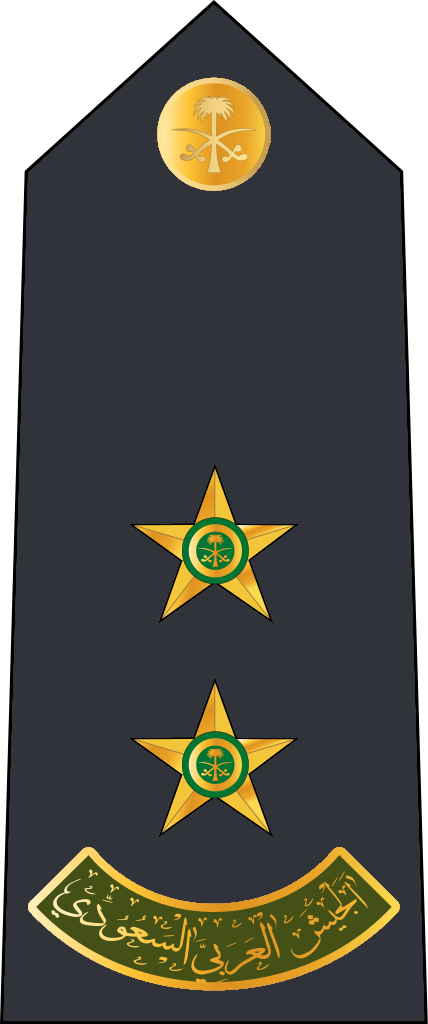
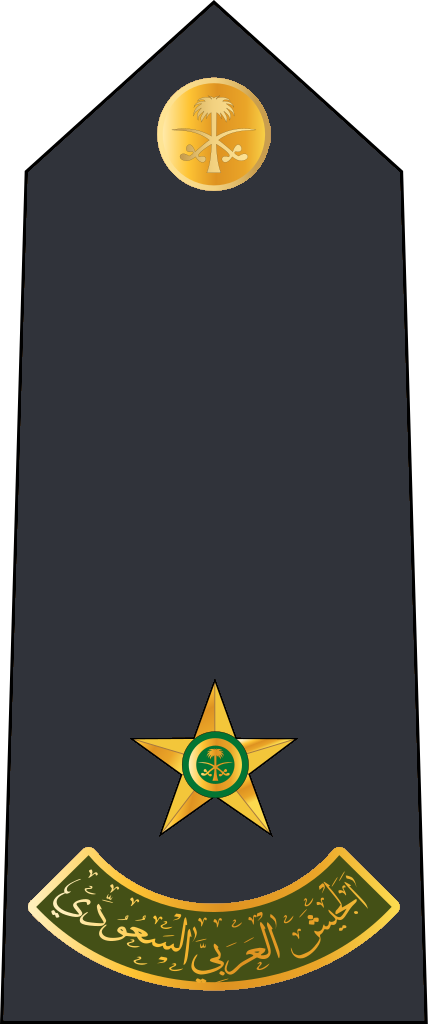
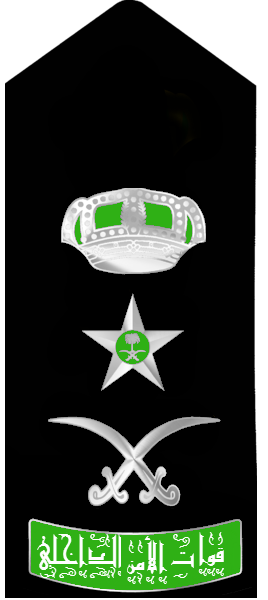
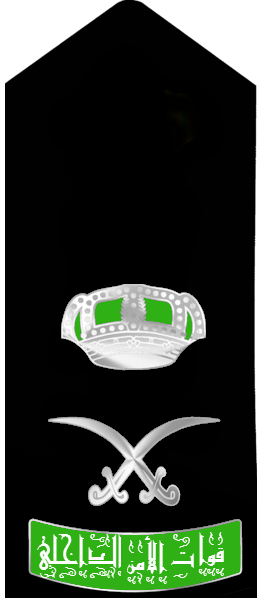
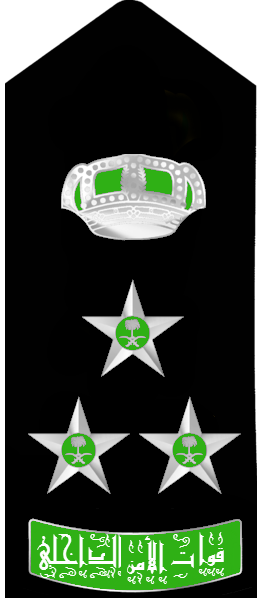
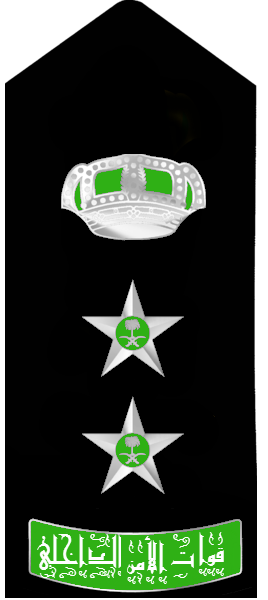
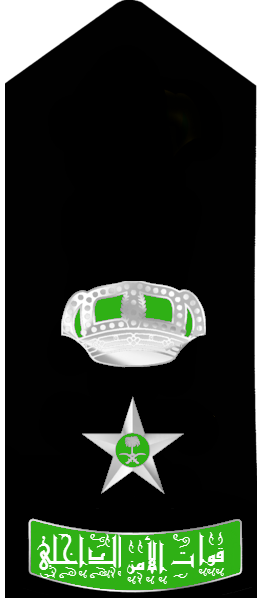
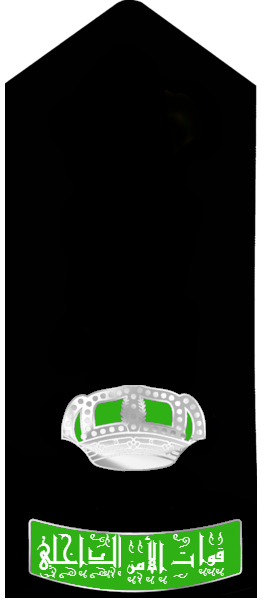
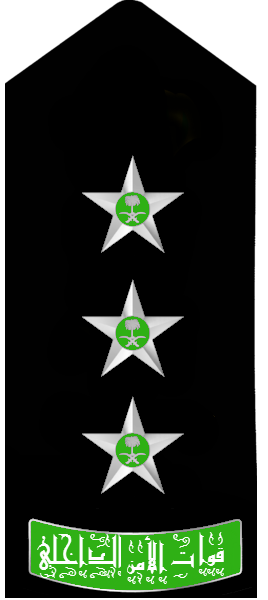
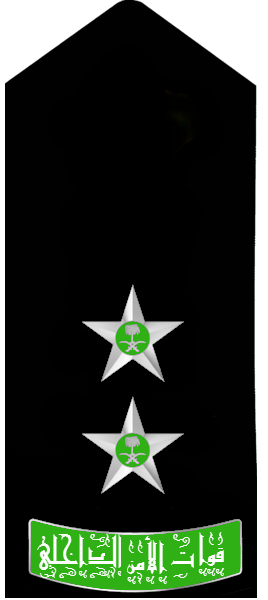
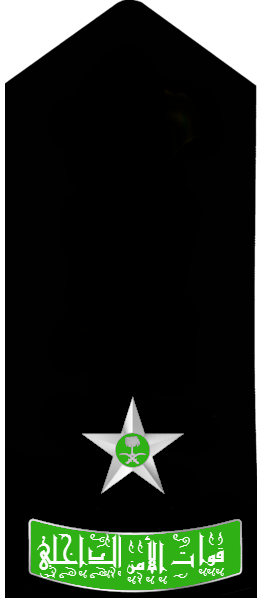
Rank group	General / flag officers				Senior officers			Junior officers
Saudi Arabian Army
Saudi Arabian Army	فريق أول; Fariq 'awal	فريق; Fariq	لواء; Liwa	عميد; Amid	عقيد; Aqid	مقدم; Muqaddam	رائد; Ra'id	نقيب; Naqib	ملازم أول; Mulazim awwal	ملازم; Mulazim
Royal Saudi Navy
Royal Saudi Navy	فريق أول; Fariq 'awal	فريق; Fariq	لواء; Liwa	عميد; Amid	عقيد; Aqid	مقدم; Muqaddam	رائد; Ra'id	نقيب; Naqib	ملازم أول; Mulazim awwal	ملازم; Mulazim
Royal Saudi Air Force
Royal Saudi Air Force	فريق أول; Fariq 'awal	فريق; Fariq	لواء; Liwa	عميد; Amid	عقيد; Aqid	مقدم; Muqaddam	رائد; Ra'id	نقيب; Naqib	ملازم أول; Mulazim awwal	ملازم; Mulazim
Royal Saudi Air Defense Forces
Royal Saudi Air Defense Forces		فريق; Fariq	لواء; Liwa	عميد; Amid	عقيد; Aqid	مقدم; Muqaddam	رائد; Ra'id	نقيب; Naqib	ملازم أول; Mulazim awwal	ملازم; Mulazim
Royal Saudi Strategic Missile Force
Royal Saudi Strategic Missile Force		فريق; Fariq	لواء; Liwa	عميد; Amid	عقيد; Aqid	مقدم; Muqaddam	رائد; Ra'id	نقيب; Naqib	ملازم أول; Mulazim awwal	ملازم; Mulazim
Saudi Arabian Royal Guard
Saudi Arabian Royal Guard	فريق أول; Fariq 'awal	فريق; Fariq	لواء; Liwa	عميد; Amid	عقيد; Aqid	مقدم; Muqaddam	رائد; Ra'id	نقيب; Naqib	ملازم أول; Mulazim awwal	ملازم; Mulazim
Saudi Arabian National Guard
Saudi Arabian National Guard		فريق; Fariq	لواء; Liwa	عميد; Amid	عقيد; Aqid	مقدم; Muqaddam	رائد; Ra'id	نقيب; Naqib	ملازم أول; Mulazim awwal	ملازم; Mulazim
Saudi Emergency Force
Saudi Emergency Force		فريق; Fariq	لواء; Liwa	عميد; Amid	عقيد; Aqid	مقدم; Muqaddam	رائد; Ra'id	نقيب; Naqib	ملازم أول; Mulazim awwal	ملازم; Mulazim
Rank group	General / flag officers				Senior officers			Junior officers

=== Special appointments ===
Rank group	General / flag officers
Saudi Arabian Army
Saudi Arabian Army	مشير; Mushir

== Other ranks ==
The rank insignia of non-commissioned officers and enlisted personnel.

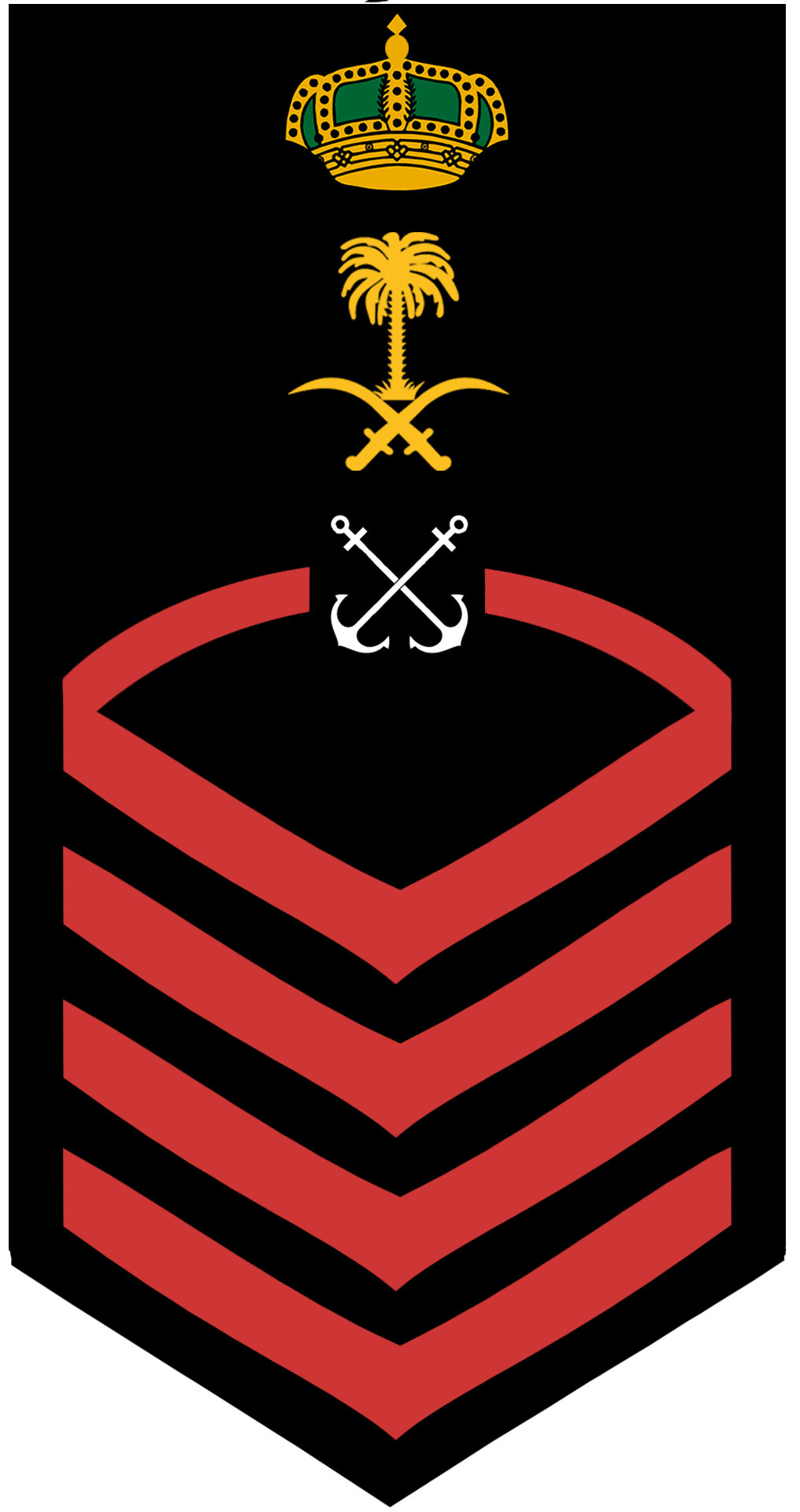
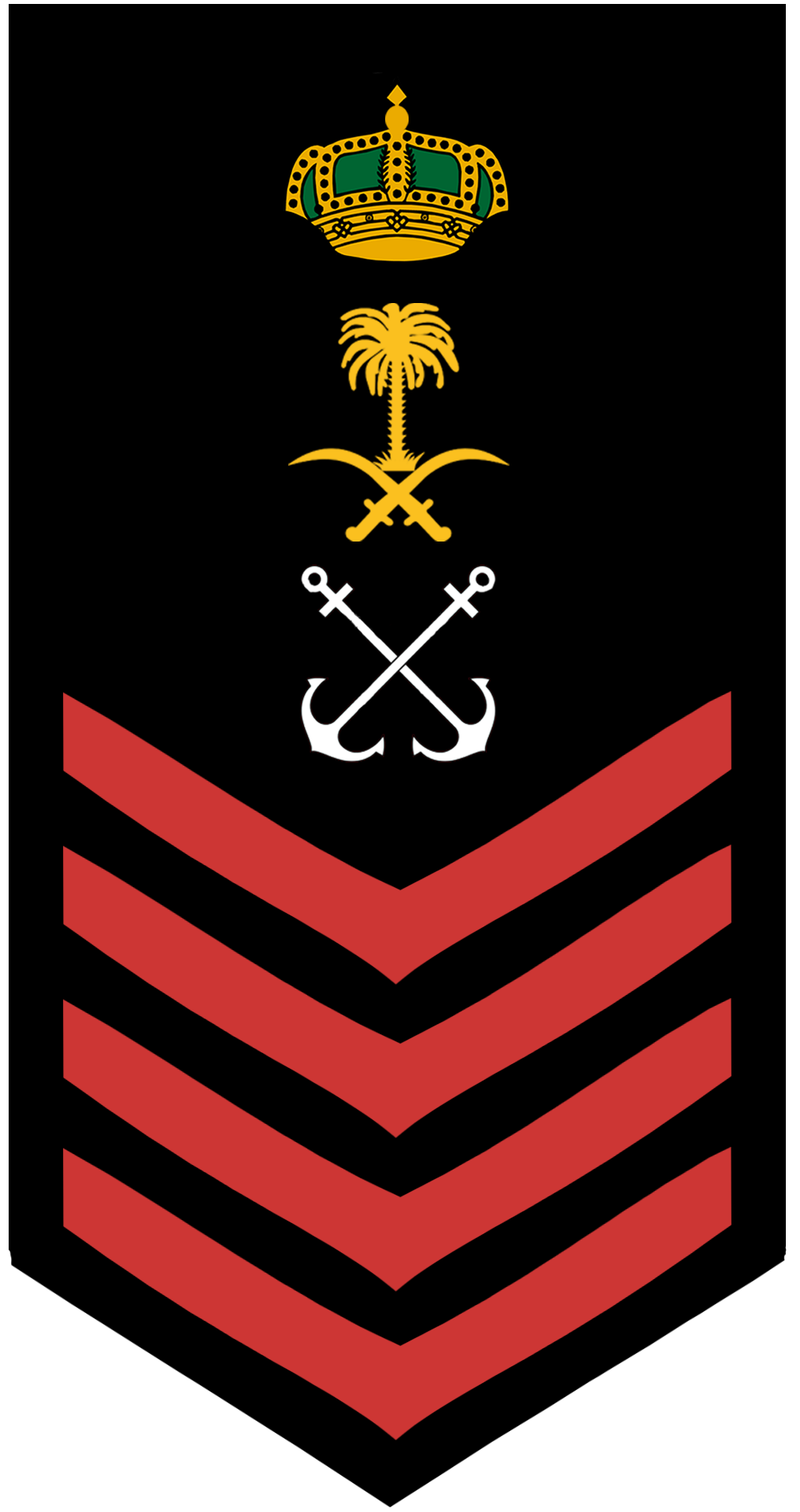
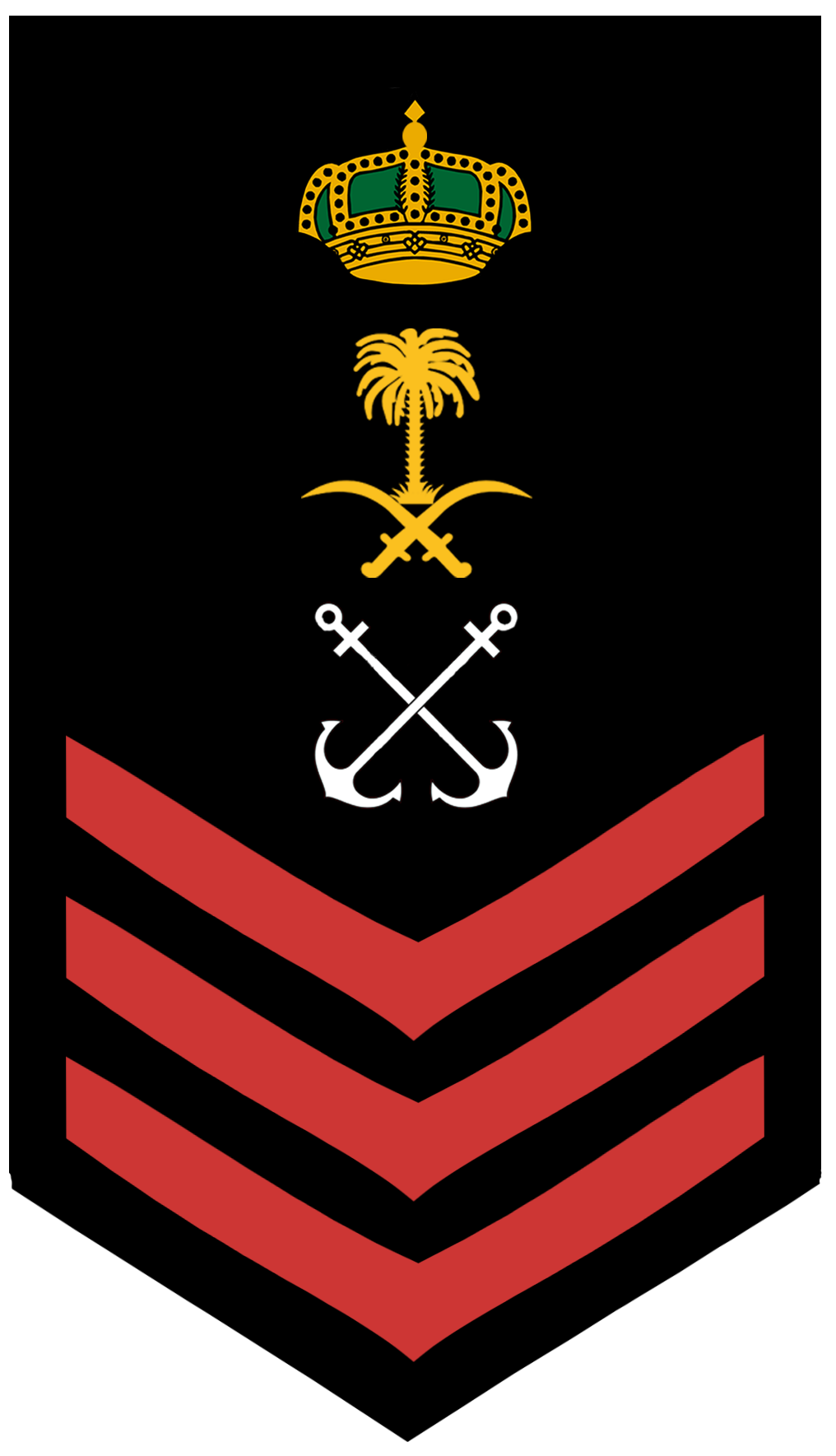
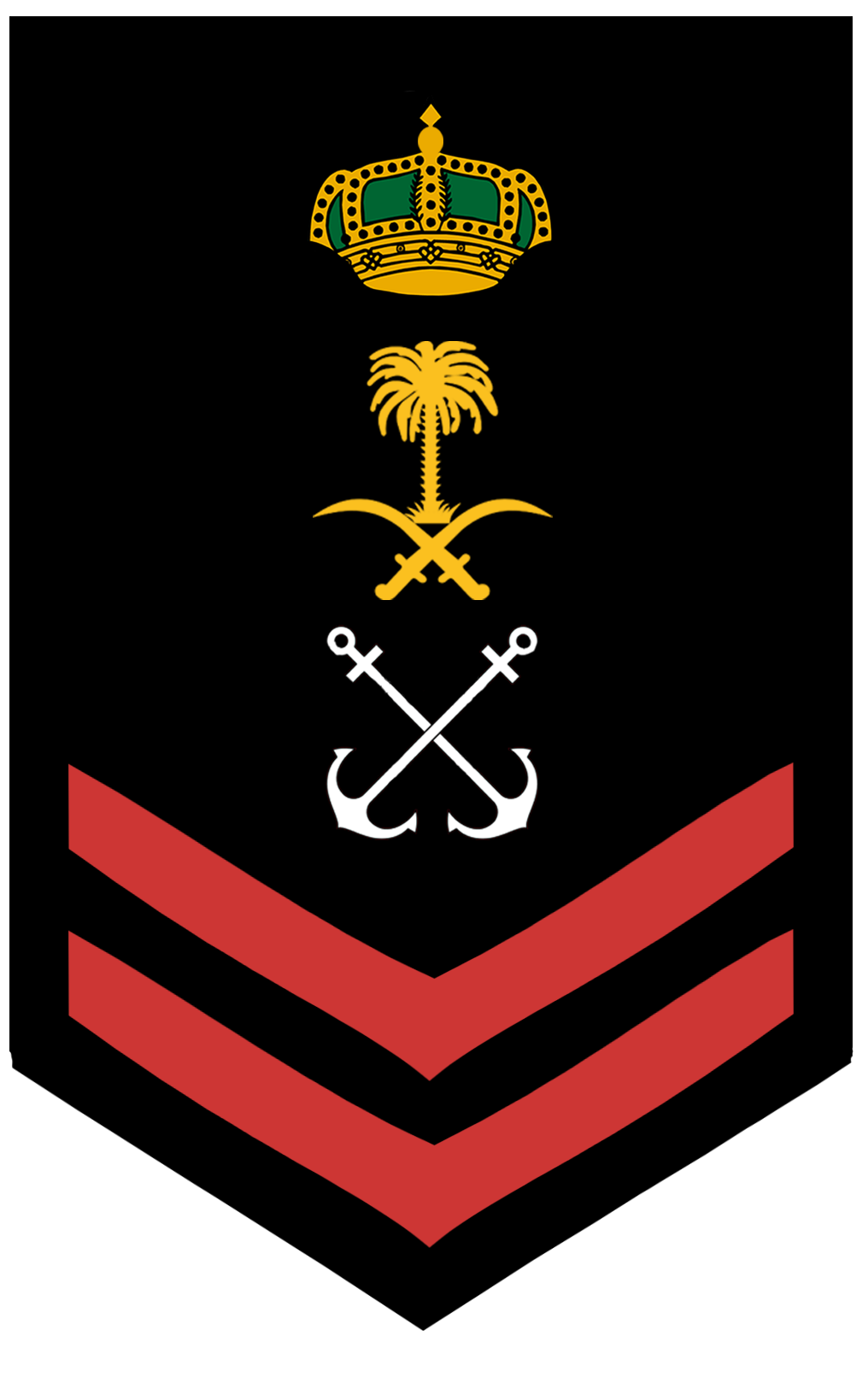
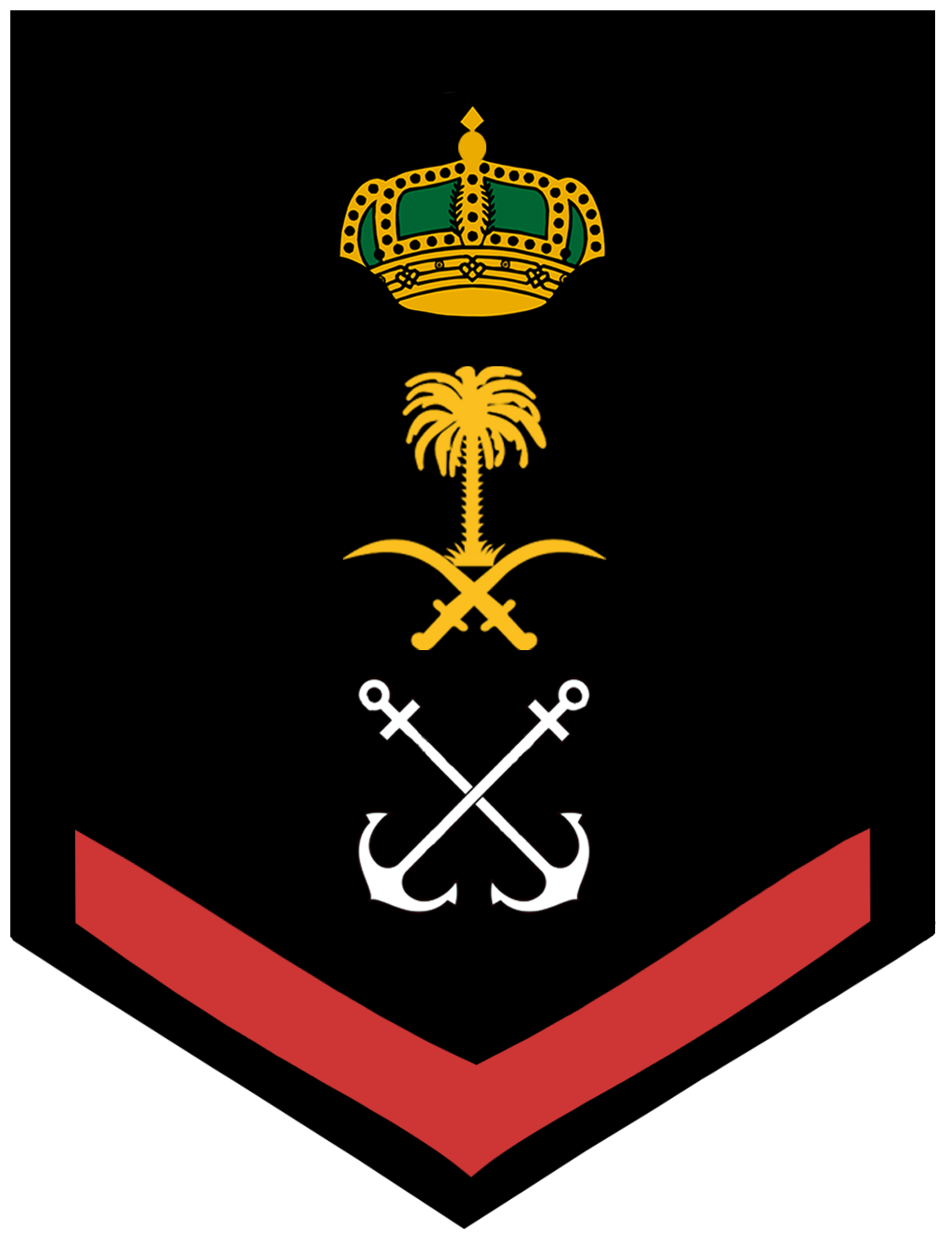
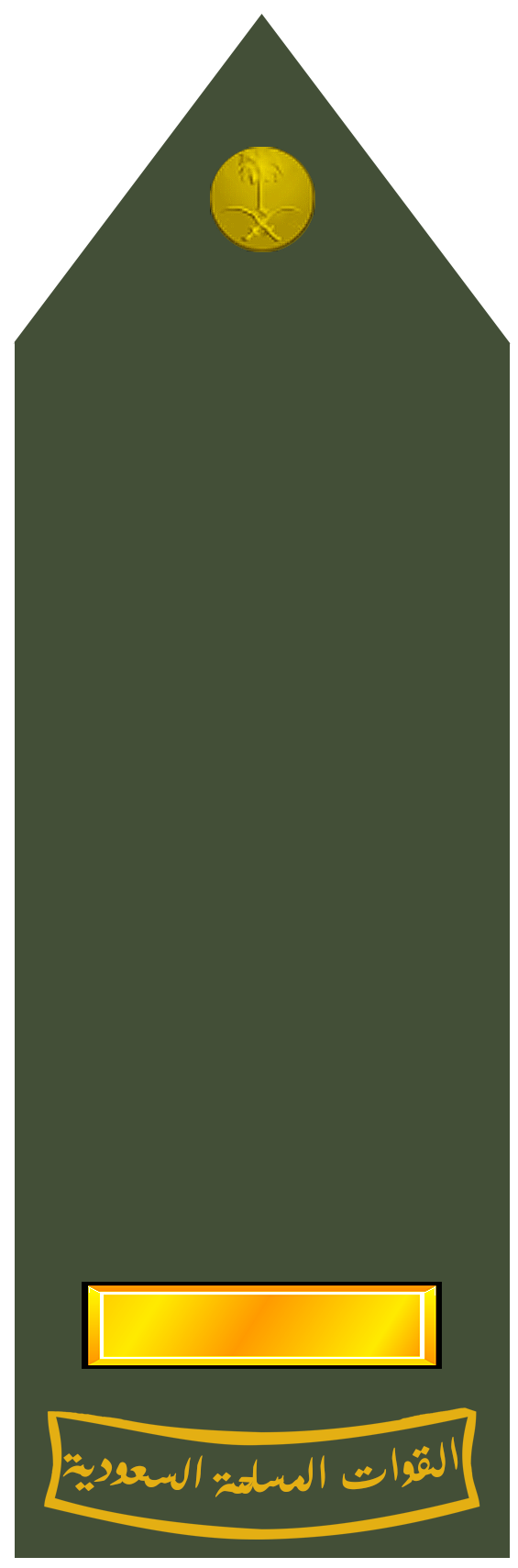
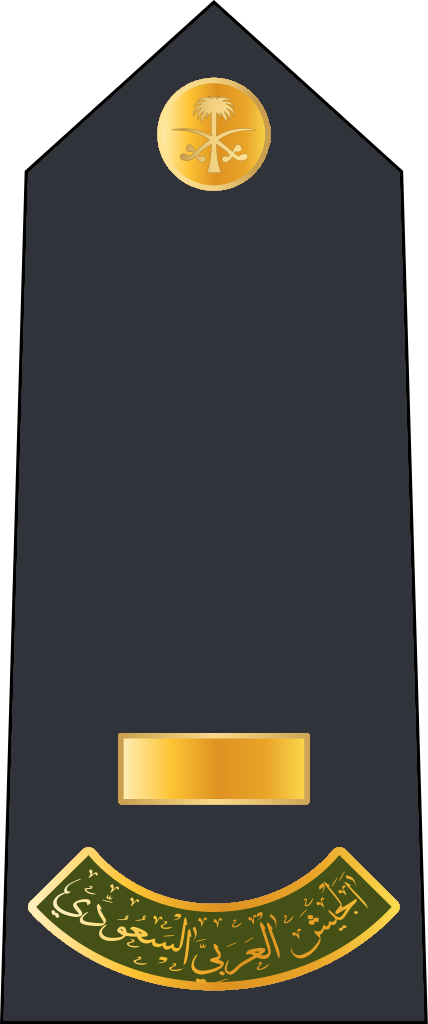
Rank group	Senior NCOs				Junior NCOs	Enlisted
Saudi Arabian Army							No insignia
Saudi Arabian Army	رئيس رقباء; Rayiys ruqaba'	رقيب أول; Raqib 'awal	رقيب; Raqib	وكيل رقيب; Wakil raqib	عريف; Earif	جندي أول; Jundiun awwal	جندي; Jundiun
Royal Saudi Navy							No insignia
Royal Saudi Navy		رقيب أول; Raqib 'awal	رقيب; Raqib	وكيل رقيب; Wakil raqib	عريف; Earif	جندي أول; Jundiun awwal	جندي; Jundiun
Royal Saudi Air Force							No insignia
Royal Saudi Air Force	رئيس رقباء; Rayiys ruqaba'	رقيب أول; Raqib 'awal	رقيب; Raqib	وكيل رقيب; Wakil raqib	عريف; Earif	جندي أول; Jundiun awwal	جندي; Jundiun
Royal Saudi Air Defense Forces							No insignia
Royal Saudi Air Defense Forces	رئيس رقباء; Rayiys ruqaba'	رقيب أول; Raqib 'awal	رقيب; Raqib	وكيل رقيب; Wakil raqib	عريف; Earif	جندي أول; Jundiun awwal	جندي; Jundiun
Royal Saudi Strategic Missile Force							No insignia
Royal Saudi Strategic Missile Force	رئيس رقباء; Rayiys ruqaba'	رقيب أول; Raqib 'awal	رقيب; Raqib	وكيل رقيب; Wakil raqib	عريف; Earif	جندي أول; Jundiun awwal	جندي; Jundiun
Saudi Arabian Royal Guard							No insignia
Saudi Arabian Royal Guard	رئيس رقباء; Rayiys ruqaba'	رقيب أول; Raqib 'awal	رقيب; Raqib	وكيل رقيب; Wakil raqib	عريف; Earif	جندي أول; Jundiun awwal	جندي; Jundiun
Saudi Arabian National Guard							No insignia
Saudi Arabian National Guard	رئيس رقباء; Rayiys ruqaba'	رقيب أول; Raqib 'awal	رقيب; Raqib	وكيل رقيب; Wakil raqib	عريف; Earif	جندي أول; Jundiun awwal	جندي; Jundiun
Saudi Arabian Border Guard							No insignia
Saudi Arabian Border Guard	رئيس رقباء; Rayiys ruqaba'	رقيب أول; Raqib 'awal	رقيب; Raqib	وكيل رقيب; Wakil raqib	عريف; Earif	جندي أول; Jundiun awwal	جندي; Jundiun
Saudi Emergency Force							No insignia
Saudi Emergency Force	رئيس رقباء; Rayiys ruqaba'	رقيب أول; Raqib 'awal	رقيب; Raqib	وكيل رقيب; Wakil raqib	عريف; Earif	جندي أول; Jundiun awwal	جندي; Jundiun
Rank group	Senior NCOs				Junior NCOs	Enlisted
