= General Staff Presidency =

- الدائرة العسكرية السعودية
- Active: 1901
- Branch: Armed Forces of Saudi Arabia
- Type: Headquarters Staff
- Part of: Ministry of Defense; Ministry of War (until 1933)
- Garrison/HQ: Riyadh

Commanders
- Chairman of the General Staff: Air Chief Marshal Fayyadh al-Ruwaili
- Vice Chairman of the General Staff: Lt. General Mutlaq Al Azaima'a

The Kingdom of Saudi Arabia's General Staff Presidency (Arabic: رئاسة الأركان العامة) is the general command of the Armed Forces of the Kingdom of Saudi Arabia, organized under the Ministry of Defense. Its headquarters is located in Riyadh.

== Current members and organization ==
Post	Name	Photo
Chairman of the General Staff	Air Chief Marshal Fayyadh al-Ruwaili	
Vice Chairman of the General Staff	Lt. General Mutlaq Al Azaima'a	
Saudi Arabian Army	Lt. General Fahd Al-Mutai	
Royal Saudi Navy	Vice Admiral Fahd al-Ghofaily	
Royal Saudi Air Force	Lt. General Turki bin Bandar Al Saud	
Royal Saudi Air Defense	Lt. General Mazyad al-Amro	
Royal Saudi Strategic Missile Force	Lt. General Jarallah Alaluwayt	

== See also ==
- Chairman of the General Staff

=== External links ===
- MoD (official website)
  - Moqatel Warrior Desert
