= Chairman of the General Staff =

Head of the armed forces of Saudi Arabia

- رئاسة هيئة الأركان العامة للقوات المسلحة

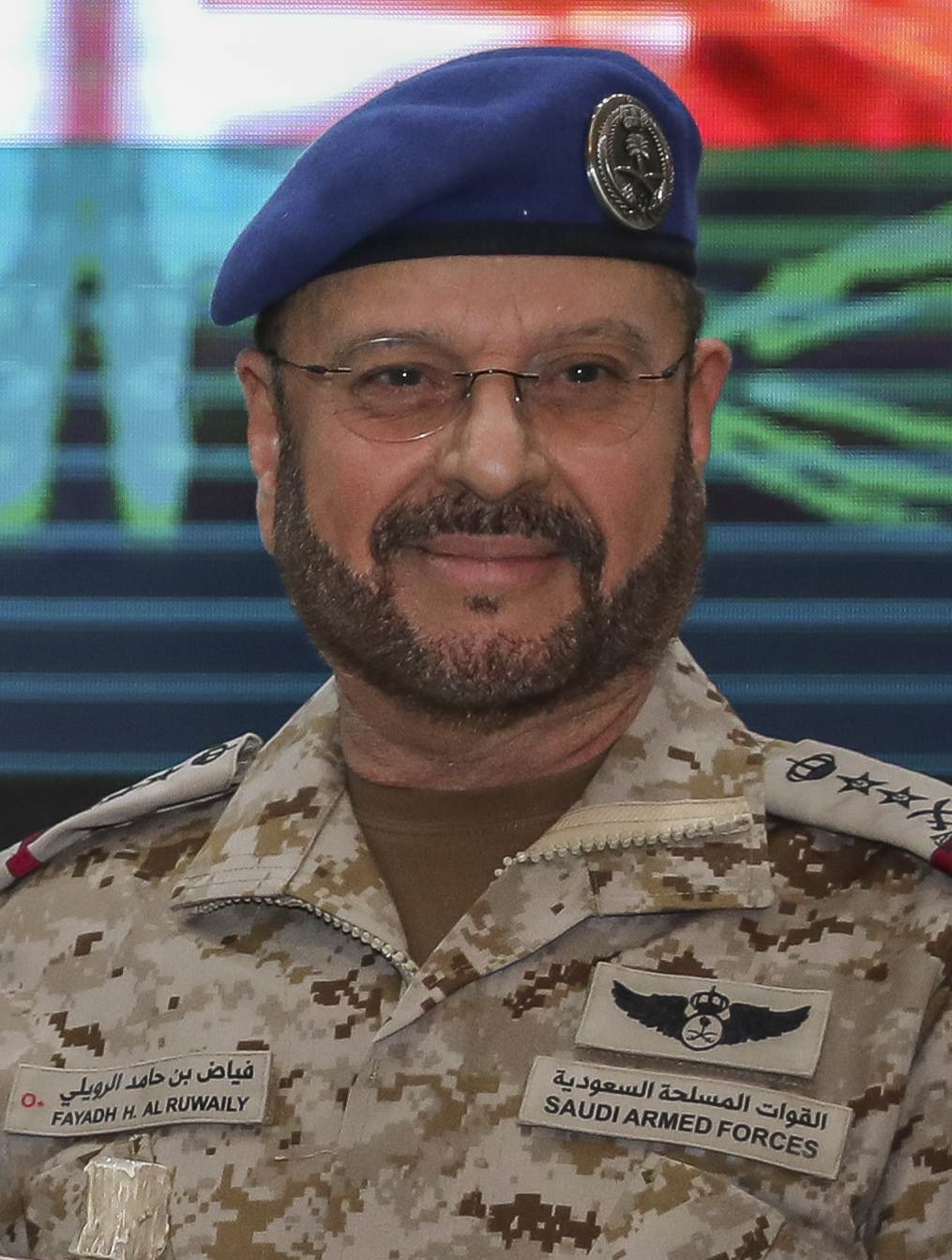
- Incumbent; Air Chief Marshal Fayyadh al-Ruwaili, RSAF since 26 February 2018
- Ministry of Defense
- Type: Chief of defence
- Status: Highest-ranking (within MoD)
- Abbreviation: COGS
- Member of: General Staff Presidency; Council of Military Service
- Nominator: Minister of Defense
- Appointer: King of Saudi Arabia
- Term length: No fixed length
- Precursor: Military Affairs Director
- Formation: 29 September 1939
- First holder: Muhammad Tariq Abd al-Qadir al-Afriqi

The Chairman of the General Staff of the Armed Forces (abbreviated COGS) also known as the "Chief of the General Staff" is the chief and highest ranking officer of the Saudi Arabian Armed Forces.

He usually holds the highest military rank within the Ministry of Defense. The current Chairman is Air Chief Marshal Fayyadh al-Ruwaili, who succeeded General Abdulrahman al-Bunian in February 2018.

== List of chairmen ==
No.	Portrait	Chairman	Took office	Left office	Time in office	Defence branch
1	Muhammad Tariq Abd al-Qadir al-Afriqi	Major General; Muhammad Tariq Abd al-Qadir al-Afriqi (c. 1886–1965)	1939	1941	1–2 years	Saudi Arabian Army
2	Ja'far Al Tayyar	Brigadier General; Ja'far Al Tayyar (18??–1944)	1941	1944	2–3 years	Saudi Arabian Army
3	Al-Sheriff Mohsen al-Hussein [ar]	Brigadier General; Al-Sheriff Mohsen al-Hussein (1908–1968)	1944	1949	4 years	Saudi Arabian Army
4	Said al-Kurdi [ar]	Brigadier General; Said al-Kurdi (1896–1964)	1949	1957	7 years	Saudi Arabian Army
5	Abdullah al-Issa [ar]	Major General; Abdullah al-Issa (1924–1975)	1957	1959	1–2 years	Saudi Arabian Army
6	Ibrahim al-Tassan [ar]	Lieutenant General; Ibrahim al-Tassan (1???–1963)	1959	1962	2–3 years	Saudi Arabian Army
7	Abdullah al-Mutlaq [ar]	General; Abdullah al-Mutlaq (19??–2015)	1962	1971	8–9 years	Saudi Arabian Army
8	Hamad Shammemry [ar]	General; Hamad Shammemry (1919–2016)	1971	1975	3–4 years	Saudi Arabian Army
9	Othman Al Hamid [ar]	General; Othman Al Hamid (c. 1923–2004)	1975	1980	4–5 years	Saudi Arabian Army
10	Mohammed al-Hamad [ar]	General; Mohammed al-Hamad (19??–2010)	1980	1996	16–17 years	Saudi Arabian Army
11	Saleh al-Mahaya	General; Saleh al-Mahaya (born 1939)	1996	2011	14–15 years	Saudi Arabian Army
12	Hussein al-Qabil [ar]	General; Hussein al-Qabil (born 1942)	2011	2014	2–3 years	Saudi Arabian Army
13	Abdulrahman al-Bunyan [ar]	General; Abdulrahman al-Bunyan	2014	2018	3–4 years	Saudi Arabian Army
14	Fayyadh al-Ruwaili	Air Chief Marshal; Fayyadh al-Ruwaili (born 1958)	26 February 2018	Incumbent	8 years, 193 days	Royal Saudi Air Force

== See also ==
- General Staff Presidency
