= Jarallah Alaluwayt =

Saudi Arabian military officer

Jarallah Alalweet

Commander of Strategic Missile Force

Personal details
- Born: Saudi Arabia

Military service
- Allegiance: Saudi Arabia
- Branch/service: Royal Saudi Strategic Missile Force
- Rank: Major general

Jarallah Alalweet (Arabic: جار الله العلويط) is a Saudi military officer of the Royal Saudi Armed Forces and the commander of the Royal Saudi Strategic Missile Force. He had officially opened the new HQ and Academy building of Strategic Missile Force in Riyadh during July 2013. Starting from 2013 his name and photos are officially opened for the general public, his personality is not classified as it was used before for all information connected with Royal Saudi Strategic Missile Force.

His post has become even more important since the Nuclear program of Saudi Arabia has been pushed forward from 2009, according to the declarations by King Abdullah of Saudi Arabia and prince Turki bin Faisal Al Saud.

Alalweet is probably the first and only commander of such military branch among all Arab and Muslim countries. Pakistan has strategic ballistic missiles too, but they are not a separate branch of the military; the Army Strategic Forces Command is subordinate of Pakistan Army.
