= Royal Saudi Air Defence Force =

- قُوَّات الدِفَّاع الجوّي المَلكِيَّ السُّعُودِيَّ
- Royal Saudi Air Defence Force badge
- Founded: 1930 (Note: 1930–1955 (as a part of the Artillery Arm of the Saudi Army) 1956–1963 (as a part of the formation of the Artillery Corps) 1963–1983 (an independent corps of the R.S. Land Forces) 1984– present (fourth armed service branches of the MOD).)
- Country: Saudi Arabia
- Allegiance: King of Saudi Arabia
- Type: Air defence
- Role: Aerial warfare
- Size: 16,000
- Part of: Saudi Armed Forces: GSP (as of 1981)
- Headquarters: Riyadh (central HQ)
- Colours
- Engagements: Gulf War; Yemen civil war: Saudi Arabian-led intervention in Yemen; Houthi–Saudi Arabian conflict; 2026 Iran war
- Website: www.rsadf.gov.sa

Commanders
- Current commander: Lt. General Mazyad al-Amro

Insignia
- Ensign

The Royal Saudi Air Defence Force (RSADF) (Arabic: قُوَّات الدِفَاع الجوّي المَلكِيَّ السُّعُودِي) is the aerial defence service branch of the Saudi Arabian Armed Forces (SAAF). It is fourth of the five service branches of the MOD. It has its HQ in Riyadh, (Note: Air Defence Ministry Building designed by Arthur Erickson Architects with Bing Thom) where there is also an underground command facility that co-ordinates the kingdom's advanced 'Peace Shield' radar and air defence system, with an estimated 16,000 active duty military personnel in 2025. Along with the Royal Saudi Air Force (RSAF), it has the responsibility for securing the skies of Saudi Arabia.

== Overview ==
Towards the end of the 1970s, a paradigm shift occurred with the Saudi Arabian Armed Forces (SAAF), with the making of the RSAD Corps as a separate and equivalent service, equal to the Army, Navy, and Air Force. It is no longer subordinate to the Royal Saudi Land Forces (RSLF). The impetus behind this shift is the ever-changing threat. The concern by the Kingdom of proliferation of weapons of mass destruction and their mechanism of delivery, resulted in the early understanding by the MoD of the requirement to transform, and thus the creation of the RSADF.

Between 2017 and 2020, the RSAF claimed the interception of 311 cruise missiles and 343 suicide drones, but failed to stop some of the attacks against the strategic Saudi sites of the Houthi movement and Iran.

=== Peace Shield ===
- Remote-controlled air/ground radio communications sites.
- 17 Lockheed Martin AN/FPS-117 long-range phased array, 3-dimensional air search radar.
- 6 Northrop Grumman AN/TPS-43 portable 3-dimensional tactical air search radar.
- Raytheon Improved HAWK air defence missile system.
- Raytheon MIM-104 Patriot air defence missile system
- Oerlikon Contraves Skyguard 35mm Twin Cannon Short Range air defence system
- Lockheed Martin THAAD anti-ballistic missile defence system
- LIG Nex1 KM-SAM

== Inventory ==
RSAD inventory
Weapon	Origin	1990	2000	2005	2006
Anti-aircraft artillery
M163 VADS	United States	92	92	92	92
AMX-30SA	France	50	50	50	50
Oerlikon GDF	Switzerland	128	128	128	128
Bofors 40mm L/70	Sweden	150	150	150	70
Surface-to-air missiles
Shahine	France	141	141	141	141
I-HAWK	United States	128	128	128	128
Crotale	France	0	40	40	40
FIM-92A Stinger / Avenger	United States	0	0	400	400
FIM-43 Redeye	United States	0	0	500	500
Mistral	France	0	0	500	500
PAC-2 Patriot	United States	0	0	0	640

== See also ==
- Royal Saudi Strategic Missile Force
