= Royal Saudi Strategic Missile Force =

- قوة الصواريخ الاستراتيجية الملكية السعودية
- Founded: 8 September 1986
- Country: Saudi Arabia
- Type: Strategic missile force
- Size: 5,000 (2025)
- Part of: Saudi Armed Forces: GSP (as of 1987)
- Headquarters: Riyadh; 4 (or 5) bases
- Anniversaries: 8 September (40 years ago)

Commanders
- Current commander: Lt. General Jarallah Alaluwayt

Insignia
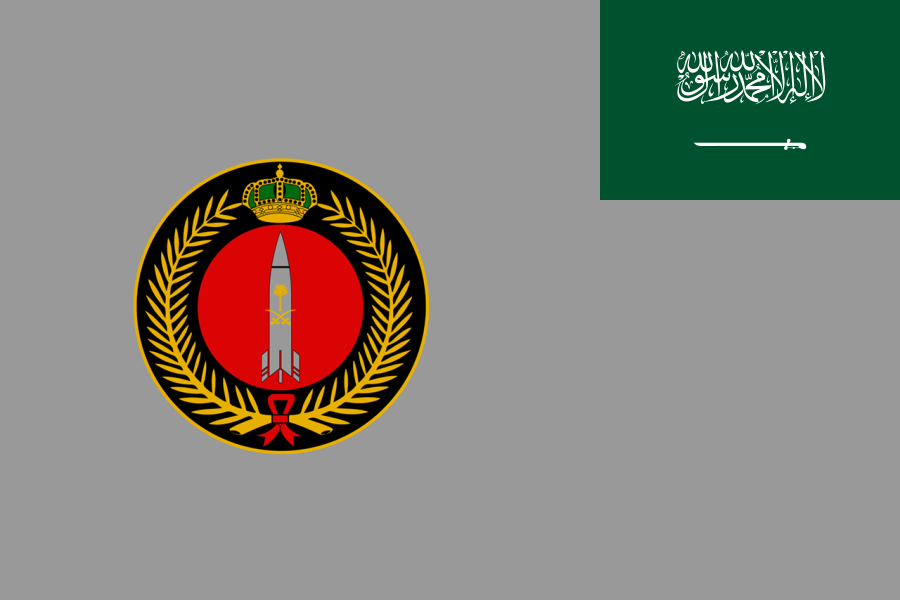
- Flag

The Royal Saudi Strategic Missile Force (RSSMF; Arabic: قوة الصواريخ الإستراتيجية الملكية السعودية, romanized: quwwa aṣ-ṣawārīkh al-ʾistrātījiyya al-milkiyya as-Saʿūdiyya) is the fifth branch of the Saudi Arabian Armed Forces, responsible for commissioning long-range strategic missiles. The RSSMF formerly had its headquarters in an underground command facility in Riyadh, Saudi Arabia.

The facility coordinated Saudi Arabia's advanced "Peace Shield" radar and air defense systems. In July 2013, the new RSSMF headquarters and academy buildings were officially opened by Prince Khalid bin Sultan bin Abdulaziz and current RSSMF commander Lieutenant General Jarallah Alaluwayt.

== History ==
The RSSMF's role has grown rapidly since Saudi Arabia and other Arab States of the Persian Gulf announced in 2009 an initiative to obtain nuclear weapons as a countermeasure to the Iranian nuclear program. King Abdullah of Saudi Arabia and Prince Turki bin Faisal Al Saud, a former Saudi intelligence chief and ambassador to Washington, both mentioned the Gulf states could acquire their own nuclear weapons as a countermeasure to Iran's.

Some experts speculate (by taking into account Saudi Arabia's financial contribution to Pakistan's nuclear weapons program) that Saudi Arabia may receive or has already received nuclear weapons from Pakistan. One report by the BBC claims "some think it is a cash-and-carry deal for warheads, the first of those options sketched out by the Saudis back in 2003; others that it is the second, an arrangement under which Pakistani nuclear forces could be deployed in the Kingdom.". The opaque nature of this agreement has led to a lot of speculation. While the sale of nuclear weapons cannot be confirmed. Saudi officials have confirmed that "This is a comprehensive defensive agreement that encompasses all military means.” when asked if Pakistan would put Saudi Arabia under their nuclear umbrella.

In January 2020, the U.S. Army Corps of Engineers Middle East District contracted a joint venture of AECOM and Tetra Tech to provide architectural and engineering services for the Saudi Missile Program.

In 2021, CNN reported that satellite images indicated that Saudi Arabia was, with Chinese assistance, manufacturing solid fueled missiles of an undetermined type.

== Facilities ==
In total RSSMF operates 4 (probably 5) bases:

1. The Strategic Missile Force has a modern underground ballistic missile base with number 444 which was built in 1956 - the Al-Watah ballistic missile base (discovered with the help of satellite images) - in the rocky central part of Saudi Arabia, some 200 km southwest of the capital city of Riyadh. The base has a security perimeter with a checkpoint on the main road, as well as extensive storage and underground facilities. It also includes administrative buildings, two launch pads, a communications tower and seven gates leading to the underground facilities. Fortified depots for launchers lie behind the secondary checkpoint in the ravine area.

2. One more partially underground base Rawdah (Raniyya) under the number 633 lies 550 km south-west from the capital and 23 km south of city Ranyah as it stated. Tunnel across the rocky ridge has two entrances which have coordinates (21°3'13"N 49°55'2"E) and (31°3'12"N 42°62'52"E), base itself: 21°2′19.3″N 42°55′36.8″E. At the 21°1.42′N 44°53.47′E one can clearly see 87 old DF-3 Chinese missiles (probably for training).

Two older bases have similar characteristics, suggesting that they share the same role. Each complex has two missile garrisons (one in the North and another in the South) with another area serving housing, maintenance and administrative functions. The garrisons themselves are located a short distance away within a secured complex. The administrative and support complexes are outside the security perimeter:

3. It is the oldest (from 1988) Al Sulayyil ballistic missile base with number 922 is also known as Wadi ad-Dawasir. Al Sulayyil base was built by the Chinese and lies approximately 450 km southwest of the capital.

4. Al Jufayr (Al Hariq) base with number 811 lies approximately 70–90 km south of Riyadh located at (24.02072, 46.35154).

5. The last unconfirmed base, Ash Shamli under the number 766, probably lies in the desert (27.26361, 40.05388) roughly 750 km north-west of the Saudi capital.

== Delivery systems ==
Model	Image	Origin	Quantity	Details
DF-3		China	30+ (IISS 2022)	The main weapon of the RSSMF is the Chinese DF-3 (CSS-2, Dongfeng missile), which carries a conventional high-explosive warhead (2150 kg) and is a variant of the DongFeng 3A Intermediate-range ballistic missile. The missile has a maximum range of 4,000 km and was delivered following an order made by Saudi Arabia in 1987. About 50 missiles (according to SIPRI) and 9~12 transporter erector launchers (TEL) were reportedly delivered in 1988, however no known test-launch has been made in the country. Saudi Arabia publicly displayed them for the first time in 2014.
DF-21		China		In 2013, media reports appeared suggesting that the RSSMF would consider purchasing the advanced DF-21 ballistic missile from China in the future. In January 2014, Newsweek revealed that Saudi Arabia had secretly bought a number of DF-21 medium-range ballistic missiles in 2007. They also said that the American CIA had allowed the deal to go through as long as the missiles were modified to not be able to carry nuclear warheads. While the DF-3 has a longer range, it was designed to carry a nuclear payload, and so had poor accuracy (300 meters CEP) if used with a conventional warhead. It would only be useful against large area targets like cities and military bases. This made them useless during the Gulf War for retaliating against Iraqi Scud missile attacks, as they would cause mass civilian casualties and would not be as effective as the ongoing coalition air attacks. After the war, the Saudis and the CIA worked together to covertly allow the purchase of Chinese DF-21s. The DF-21 is solid-fueled instead of liquid-fueled like the DF-3, so it takes less time to prepare for launch. It is accurate to 30 meters CEP, allowing it to attack specific targets like compounds or palaces. The Saudis are not known to possess mobile launchers, but may use some 100~125 launchers originally bought with the DF-3s. The number of DF-21 missiles that were bought is unknown. Newsweek speculates that details of the deal being made public is part of Saudi deterrence against Iran.

== See also ==
- Royal Saudi Air Defense Forces
- Golden Wheel Project (Dongfeng missiles program in Saudi Arabia)
