= Muhammad Tariq Abd al-Qadir al-Afriqi =

Libyan military officer

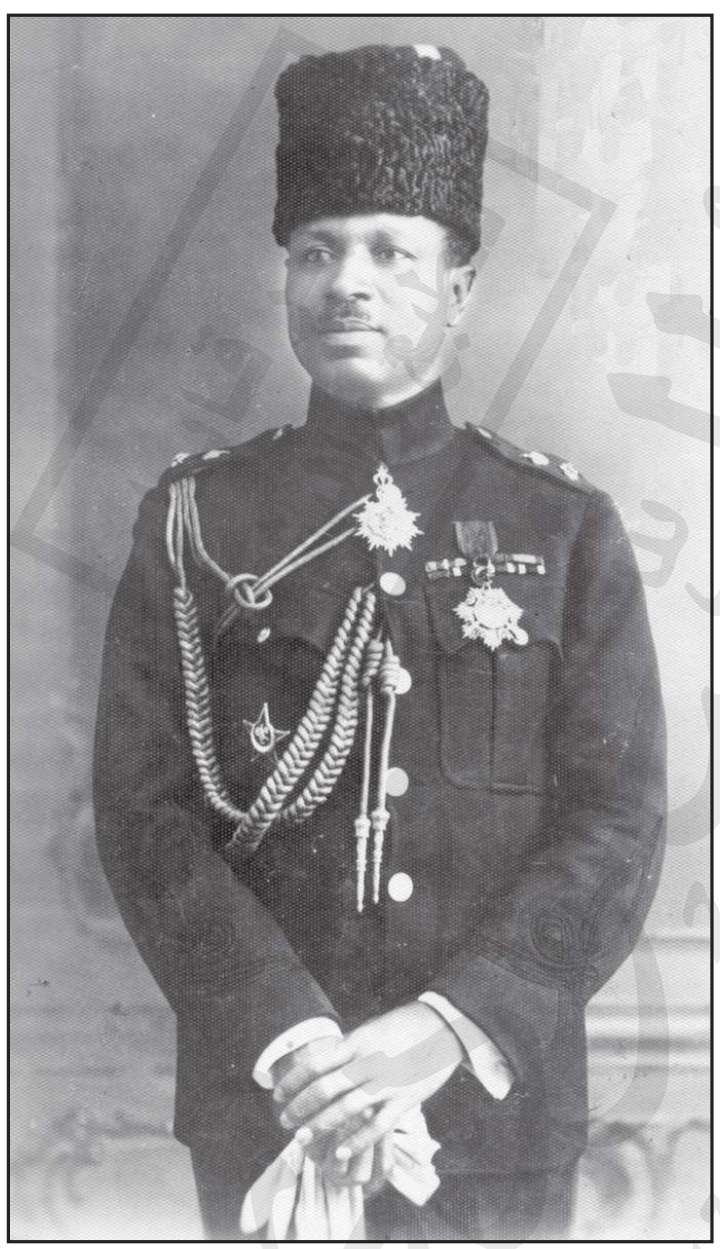
- Native name: محمد طارق عبد القادر الإفريقي
- Nickname: Al-Namir al-Aswad (The Black Tiger)
- Born: 1886; Tripoli, Tripolitania
- Died: October 15, 1963 (aged 76–77) Damascus, Syria
- Buried: Bab al-Saghir Cemetery
- Allegiance: Ottoman Tripolitania; Ottoman Empire; Syrian rebels; Ethiopian Empire; Saudi Arabia; Holy War Army
- Conflicts: Italo-Turkish War; First World War; Great Syrian Revolt; Second Italo-Ethiopian War; Arab-Israeli War

Muhammad Tariq Abd al-Qadir al-Tarabulsi al-Afriqi (Arabic: محمد طارق عبد القادر الطرابلسي الإفريقي) was a Libyan military officer who served as a commander in the Ottoman Army and later he became the first Chief of War Staff of King Abd al-Aziz al-Saud's army, with the rank of brigadier general, and in addition he participated in the Arab-Israeli War. Tariq al-Afriqi possessed extensive military culture and experience and was fluent in Arabic, Turkish, German, French and Hausa. Known for his commitment to Arab nationalism, he was nicknamed Al-Namir al-Aswad (The Black Tiger) because of his ethnic origin.

== Early life ==
Muhammad Tariq was born in 1886 in the western city of Tripoli, the son of an Arab man from Fezzan named Abd al-Qadir and an ethnic Hausa Nigerian woman. From an early age he displayed prodigious intelligence and great tact and understanding, this brilliance caught the attention of the people which led him to be adopted and raised by an Ottoman official who gave him the nickname Al-Afriqi (The African). Convinced of his talent and great potential, his adoptive father enrolled the young Tariq al-Afriqi in a military school in Tripoli from which he graduated with honors, which will allow him to continue his studies in Turkey. He graduated from the Turkish military school with the rank of second lieutenant and decided to join a training course in Germany, learning the language easily and standing out among his peers. When he was 25 years old and in Germany, he was called to serve his native Libya against the invading Italians.

== Military life ==
=== First World War ===
With the signing of the Treaty of Ouchy in 1912, Libya was officially ceded to Italy, forcing Tariq, like all other Ottoman officers, soldiers and employees, to leave the territory. After being forced to leave his native Libya, Tariq was reassigned to the Balkans. With the outbreak of the Great War, he will be selected as one of the Turkish and Libyan officers to attack the British in Egypt. Tariq al-Afriqi was among the group that reached the eastern borders to push Sheikh Ahmed al-Sharif to fight the British in Egypt. Tariq participated in the advance of the Ottoman Libyan troops towards the outskirts of Alexandria, but lack of supplies and lack of equipment caused the troops to withdraw. After this failure, Tariq continued in the fight and joined the forces of Sheikh Sulayman al-Baruni in western Libya, who was appointed by the Ottomans as governor of Tripoli in the west, where he continued with him to fight against Italy, but as soon as the heat of the war subsided on the western sides, Tariq al-Afriqi infiltrated across the border into French Tunisia, but was discovered by French forces, arrested and imprisoned. Tariq remained in a French jail in Tunisia until the end of the war.

=== French occupation of Syria ===
After the end of the Great War, Tariq al-Afriqi was released and deported to Turkey. Back in Turkey, with the events that had been taking place in the post-war period, including the division of the Arab world by France and the United Kingdom, Tariq will identify deeply with the Arab nationalist cause and the anti-colonial struggle. This feeling led him to move to Damascus to join the rebellion and fight against the French occupation. During the fighting, he became known as the Black Tiger and caught the eye of Libyan Arab nationalist leader Bashir al-Sadawi. Al-Sadawi founded an association of Libyan exiles in the Levant for the liberation of Libya called the Tripoli Defense Association and of which Tariq al-Afriqi will be a very important member. When Ahmad Nami's government sought advice from al-Sadawi, Tariq used this to approach and curry favor with the Syrian authorities and obtain citizenship.

Tariq will become a well-known enthusiastic activist for the liberation of the Arab World, which will lead him to be taken into account and invited to participate in the First Islamic Conference in Jerusalem, where several Muslim Arab nationalist leaders met to study and discuss the issues in around the Arab and Islamic world and its future. Both Tariq al-Afriqi and Bashir al-Sadawi attended as official representatives of occupied Libya.

=== Italian occupation of Ethiopia ===
Tariq al-Afriqi, as an African, was not only sympathetic to the Arab cause, he also showed sympathy and concern for the African liberation struggles. In fact, he identified as both an Arab and an African and a Muslim, drawing sympathy for both Pan-Arabism, Pan-Africanism and Pan-Islamism. When Italy, the same country that occupied Libya, decided to colonize Ethiopia, Tariq al-Afriqi decided to leave Syria to volunteer to lead the resistance war against Italy. He managed to infiltrate Ethiopia and once there he commanded one of his armies against the Italian forces. When the Italians were victorious and occupied Ethiopia, Tariq managed to flee to Sudan. From Sudan he managed to infiltrate and through Egypt and from there he was able to return to Damascus. Upon his return from the war in Syria, he met his future wife, whom he would marry soon after. Tariq and his wife will have two daughters.

== Death ==
In 1958 Muhammad Tariq al-Afriqi suffered a paralysis that forced him to confine himself to bed for the last years of his life. His condition worsened and finally on Tuesday, October 15, 1963, he died. Tariq was buried in the Bab al-Saghir Cemetery in Damascus.
