= Saudi Arabian Army =

- القُوَّاتُ البَرِّيَّةُ المَلَكِيَّة السُّعُودِيَّة
- Emblem of the Royal Saudi Land Forces
- Founded: 1744 de facto January 13, 1902 de jure
- Country: Saudi Arabia
- Type: Land forces
- Role: Ground-based warfare
- Size: 75,000
- Part of: Saudi Armed Forces
- Garrison/HQ: Ministry Of Defense
- Motto: "الله أكبر"; God is the greatest
- Anniversaries: 13 January; 124 years ago: Battle of Riyadh (1902)
- Equipment: List of equipment
- Engagements: List of wars
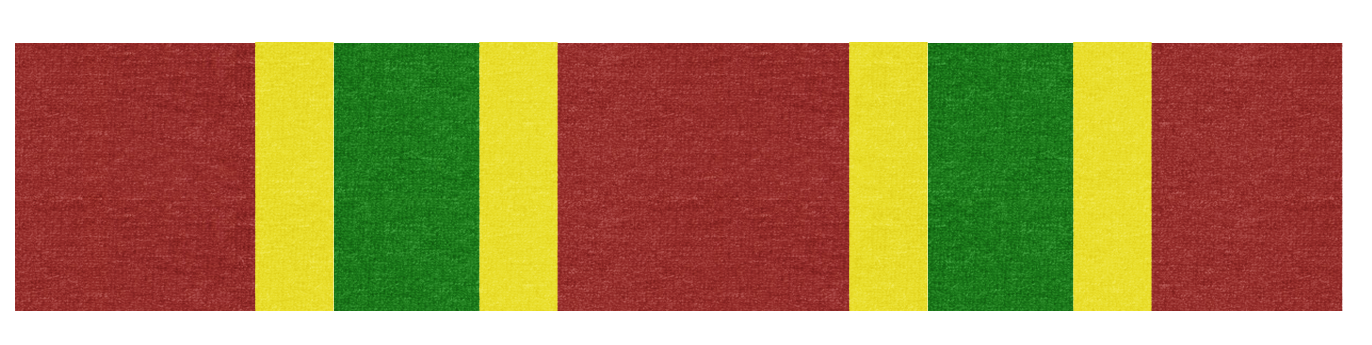
- Decorations
- Website: www.mod.gov.sa

Commanders
- Current commander: Lt. Gen. Fahd Al-Juhani
- Notable commanders: Faisal of Saudi Arabia; Abdulaziz of Saudi Arabia; Turki bin Abdullah Al Saud (1755–1834); Abdulaziz bin Muhammad Al Saud; Abdullah bin Saud Al Saud; Faisal al-Duwaish; Dhaydan bin Hithlain; Sultan bin Bajad Al Otaibi; Sultan bin Abdulaziz

Insignia
- Flag

- War flag

The Saudi Arabian Army (Arabic: الجَيْشُ العَرَبِيَّ السُّعُودِيَّ, romanized: Al-Jaysh al-Arabiya as-Su'udiya), officially the Royal Saudi Land Forces (Arabic: القُوَّاتُ البَرِّيَّةُ المَلَكِيَّة السُّعُودِيَّة, romanized: Al-Quwwat al-Barriyah al-Malakiyah as-Su'udiyah), is the principal land warfare branch of the Armed Forces of Saudi Arabia. It is part of the Saudi Ministry of Defense, which is one of the two military departments of the government of Saudi Arabia, together with the Ministry of National Guard. Its primary mandate is the defense of Saudi Arabia's territory and the safeguarding of national interests against external threats.

Organized across eight regional commands, the RSLF's network extends throughout Saudi Arabia, encompassing various regional and independent commands, military institutes, colleges, specialized schools, and diverse administrative units. This extensive infrastructure enables the RSLF to maintain operational readiness and adapt to wartime conditions effectively.

The RSLF's capabilities have progressively developed, with improvements in organizational structure, leadership, and expansion of its primary weapon systems and personnel. The highest-ranking official within the RSLF is the Chairman of the General Staff, while overall command is held by the General Commander of the Saudi Land Forces, a Lieutenant General who oversees regional commands and specialized divisions. This commander also serves on the military council at the ministerial level, guiding the strategic direction of the RSLF. Officer training primarily takes place at the War College in Riyadh, which commissions the majority of RSLF officers.

== History ==
=== Genesis of the army ===
In the mid-18th century, shortly after its establishment, the Saudi state lacked a formalized, modern army as seen in contemporary military structures. Instead, defense and military actions were conducted through a “Jihad Army,” mobilized upon the directive of the ruling Imam through a process of general mobilization. Historian Ibn Bishr notes that during the rule of Imam Saud bin Abdulaziz, the mobilization of the Jihad Army was achieved by dispatching envoys across towns, villages, and tribal areas under Saudi control, calling upon local forces to assemble. This collective approach allowed the Saudi state to respond to threats and expand its influence, relying on a call-to-arms system rather than a standing army.

During the era of the Imams, the Saudi military organization could mobilize an estimated force of approximately 100,000 fighters, drawn from various regions and equipped with essential arms and supplies. This number included contributions from nomadic Bedouin tribes, who were required to provide a contingent of roughly 30,000 to 40,000 soldiers. However, the Saudi state lacked formal military training institutions; instead, fighters relied on personal skills, including swordsmanship, thrusting, and horsemanship, forming the core of their capabilities.

Saudi forces were divided into infantry, cavalry, and camel-mounted troops. Combat operations relied on valor and numerical strength rather than structured training or systematic combat techniques. Despite the limited formal training, Saudi fighters excelled in desert warfare, demonstrating resilience in enduring its challenges. Weaponry was traditional and basic, comprising matchlock rifles, swords, daggers, arrows, and spears. Tactics involved surprise attacks, ambushes, sieges, and hit-and-run maneuvers, focusing on adaptability in battle.

Saudi soldiers did not receive fixed salaries; instead, their compensation came from war spoils distributed following a victorious campaign. The state claimed one-fifth of the spoils for the treasury, while the remaining four-fifths were sold and divided among soldiers, with cavalry members receiving double the shares of foot soldiers. Troops remained mobilized until directed to return to their homelands by the supreme commander. Additionally, permanent garrisons served as local security forces, rotating annually to maintain order. A dedicated personal guard protected the Imam, his successor, and other princes.

=== Modern army ===
The Saudi Arabian Army, formally founded on January 15, 1902, began with King Abdulaziz bin Abdulrahman Al Saud's campaign to reclaim Riyadh. This moment marked the establishment of a formal military structure as the founder prioritized the organization, leadership, and armament of the Saudi Land Forces.

Before the official declaration of the Kingdom, Saudi Arabia began developing administrative and military frameworks that would shape the foundation of its national defense. By late December 1925, the administrative core of the Saudi Army was established with the creation of the Army General Staff in Taif. The primary units formed at this time included the Infantry Regiment, Artillery Regiment, and Machine Gun Regiment.

The Defense Agency and the Military Department were responsible for organizing the army's structures, standardizing military institutions, and assigning them roles in line with modern organizational standards. Taif was selected as the agency's headquarters due to its established military presence, conducive climate for training, and available military barracks. Emphasizing education and training, the military school in Taif became central to developing a skilled officer corps, setting the stage for the Saudi Army's future expansion and modernization.

== Structure ==
=== Main Departments ===
==== Management Department ====
Military Flag (1745–1818).

The Royal Saudi Land Forces Command, one of the oldest institutions within the Saudi Arabian Army, was initially known as the "Army Administration." In its formative years, prior to 1971, it comprised a command office along with various departments that handled essential functions such as personnel planning and budgeting, military records, military affairs, war police, army music, medical services, civilian personnel matters, and a military trials court and prison located in Riyadh.

Military Flag (1818–1925).

In 1971, the Army Management Authority underwent a reorganization, which resulted in a more streamlined structure consisting of a command office, a personnel planning department, a civilian personnel affairs department, a religious affairs department, a general medical services department, and a war police department. By 1976, as the structure of the Land Forces became more formalized, the name of the authority was modified to reflect its evolving responsibilities. It was expanded to include a command office and specialized departments for personnel matters, military affairs, and personnel planning and classification, as well as a center for receiving and recruiting new recruits in Riyadh and a technical institute for the Land Forces. This authority remains responsible for overseeing personnel, staff affairs, military records, and related military matters.

==== Operations Department ====
The War Flag of the Saudi Arabian Army (1925-).

The Royal Saudi Land Forces Operations Authority is tasked with the training, planning, and operational oversight of the land forces. Its initial formation, established in 1961, was known as the "War Operations Authority." This organization included three key departments: the Organization and Armament Department, the Military Training Department, and the Plans and Operations Department. In 1977, the name was changed to the "Land Forces Operations Authority." Subsequently, in 1991, the authority expanded to include an Operations Center and a Sports Affairs Department, the latter of which had previously operated as a section within the Land Forces Training Department.

Moreover, a Language School was established, which was later renamed the Military Language Institute. Initially, the War Operations Authority was affiliated with the Army Schools Command, but this command was eventually abolished. The Culture and Education Administration, responsible for educational institutions serving the children of military personnel, transitioned into an independent entity within the armed forces. Additionally, the authority incorporated a Physical Education School located in Taif, established in 1955, which was eventually dissolved, with its functions integrated into the Center and School for Paratroopers and Special Forces in 1978.

==== Supply Department ====
The Royal Saudi Land Forces Supply and Logistics Authority, previously referred to as the "Army Supplies Authority," underwent restructuring with the reorganization of the Land Forces Command, leading to its current designation. The authority encompasses several departments, including the Department of Supply and Logistics Plans for the Land Forces and the Department of Military Supplies Inventory. These departments are responsible for coordinating supply chain operations, managing logistics, and maintaining an inventory of military supplies to support the operational readiness of the Royal Saudi Land Forces.

=== Independent Departments ===
The Land Forces Command has several associated departments, including:

- Land Forces Inspectorate Department
- Land Forces Officers Affairs Department
- Land Forces Personnel Management
- Land Forces Planning, Budgeting and Monitoring Department
- Land Forces Internal Procurement Department
- Land Forces Religious Affairs Department
- Land Forces Medical Affairs Department
- Land Forces Finance and Budget Department
- Land Forces Training Department (newly independent from the Operations Department)
- Land Forces Computer Department (Information Technology Department)

=== Independent commanders ===
==== Geographical coverage ====
Number	Area Command	Administrative region	Military capital
1	المنطقة الشمالية الغربية العسكرية	Tabuk Province	Tabuk
2	المنطقة الشمالية العسكرية	Eastern Province, Saudi Arabia	Hafar al-Batin
3	المنطقة الشرقية العسكرية	Eastern Province, Saudi Arabia	Dhahran
4	المنطقة الجنوبية العسكرية	Asir	Khamis Mushait
5	المنطقة الغربية العسكرية	Mecca Province	Jeddah
6	منطقة الطائف العسكرية	Mecca Province	Taif
7	منطقة المدينة المنورة العسكرية	Medina Province	Ali's wells
8	منطقة الإمدادات والتموين العسكرية	Riyadh Province	Al-Kharj

==== Military cities ====
Number	City	Notes
1	King Faisal Military City	Established near the city of Khamis Mushait in the Southern Province in 1971.
2	King Abdulaziz Military City	Established in the Northern Borders Province, it was inaugurated by King Faisal in 1973
3	King Khalid Military City	Established near the city of Hafar al-Batin in the Northern Borders Province, its foundation stone was laid by King Khalid in 1976
4	King Fahd Military City	Established in the Eastern Province and inaugurated by the Minister of Defense, Aviation, and Inspector General in 1988

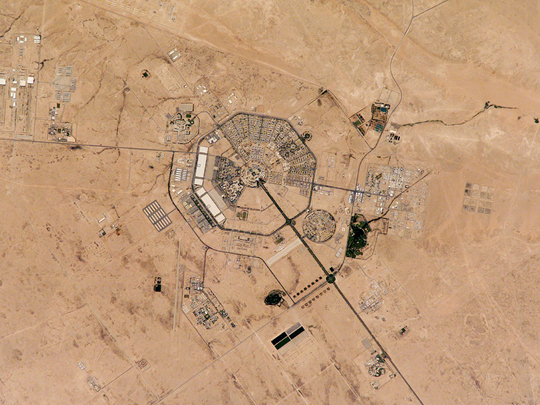
King Khalid Military City.

==== Military Police Command ====
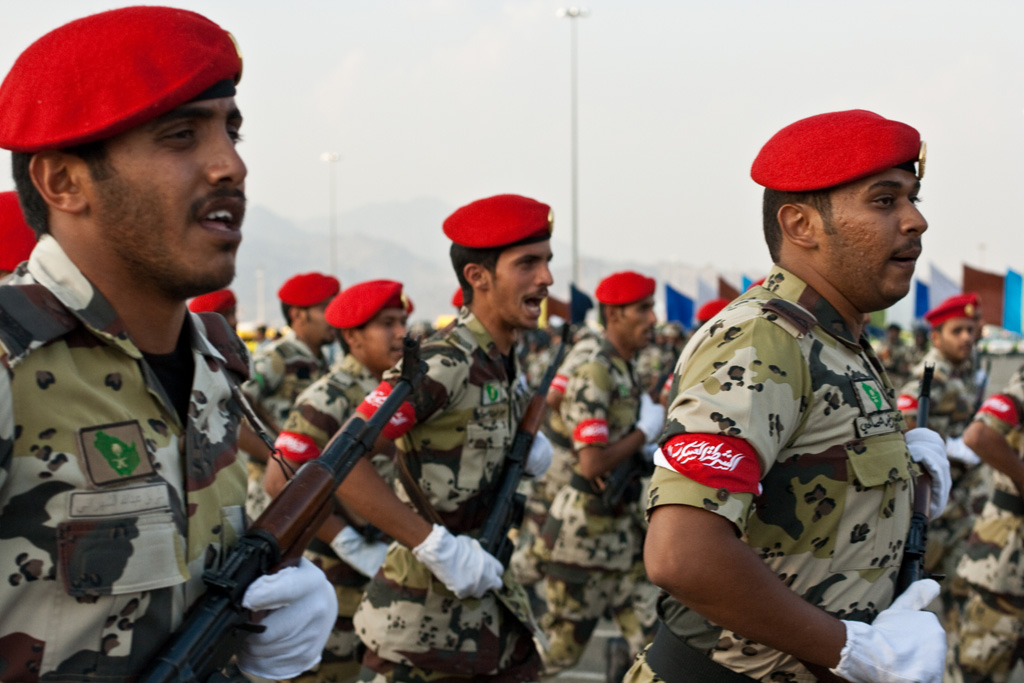
Special Military Police ahead of the Hajj season.

The Military Police of the Royal Saudi Land Forces serve as a crucial component of the armed forces, responsible for maintaining military discipline and enforcing regulations. Their duties encompass overseeing compliance with military orders and protocols, and they possess the authority to take action against military personnel who violate regulations, execute judicial rulings, and manage military prisons.

In addition to their internal enforcement responsibilities, the Military Police work to prevent violations by both military and civilian individuals within areas under military jurisdiction. They are tasked with restricting access to sensitive zones, preventing acts of destruction and sabotage, securing military installations, and managing the movement and protection of military convoys. Collaboration with civil authorities on matters pertaining to the armed forces is also part of their mandate.

In operational theaters, the Military Police function as a combat support unit, contributing to the security of rear areas, overseeing prisoner custody and evacuation, maintaining law and order, and controlling transportation routes and military movements. Their multifaceted role underscores their importance in ensuring the operational effectiveness and discipline of the Royal Saudi Land Forces.

==== Military College Leadership ====
The establishment of the first military school in Al-Rass in 1935 marked the beginning of an evolution in military education in Saudi Arabia, ultimately leading to the creation of a military college. Initially, this school admitted candidates with educational qualifications below the primary level, with a duration of study set at six months. In 1939, the school relocated to Taif, and after a thorough assessment of its operations, a royal decree was issued on October 25th, 1954 to establish a military college in Riyadh, which was named "King Abdulaziz College." The college officially opened its doors on December 22nd, 1955, becoming the first military academic institution in the kingdom.

In response to the increasing educational standards in Saudi Arabia and the growing demand for graduates with diverse specializations, the college raised its admission requirements to the general secondary level in 1960. The study duration was extended to three years, after which graduates were awarded a Bachelor of Military Science and commissioned as officers in one of the branches of the Royal Saudi Land Forces.

The college curriculum is structured into military sciences (20.45%), academic sciences (25.34%), and general activities (55.20% for infantry and physical education). Academic subjects are taught by civilian faculty members with advanced degrees, who operate under university regulations.

Eligible candidates for admission include Saudi nationals aged between 17 and 24, holding a secondary school diploma in the scientific track. Applicants must fulfill specific admission criteria, pass a personal interview, and undergo a medical examination. The first graduating class received their Bachelor's degrees in 1962.

To keep pace with advancements in various fields across the kingdom, a new campus for the college was constructed utilizing modern architectural and engineering methods, equipped with contemporary educational and training facilities. The site was strategically chosen for its proximity to Riyadh, overlooking the historically significant town of Al-Uyaynah, where Sheikh Muhammad ibn Abd al-Wahhab initiated his Salafi call with the support of Prince Muhammad ibn Saud of Diriyah. The transition to the new college buildings was completed in November of 1983, with the official inauguration taking place in Sha'ban May 1984 during a grand ceremony.

=== Independent weapons ===
==== Infantry ====
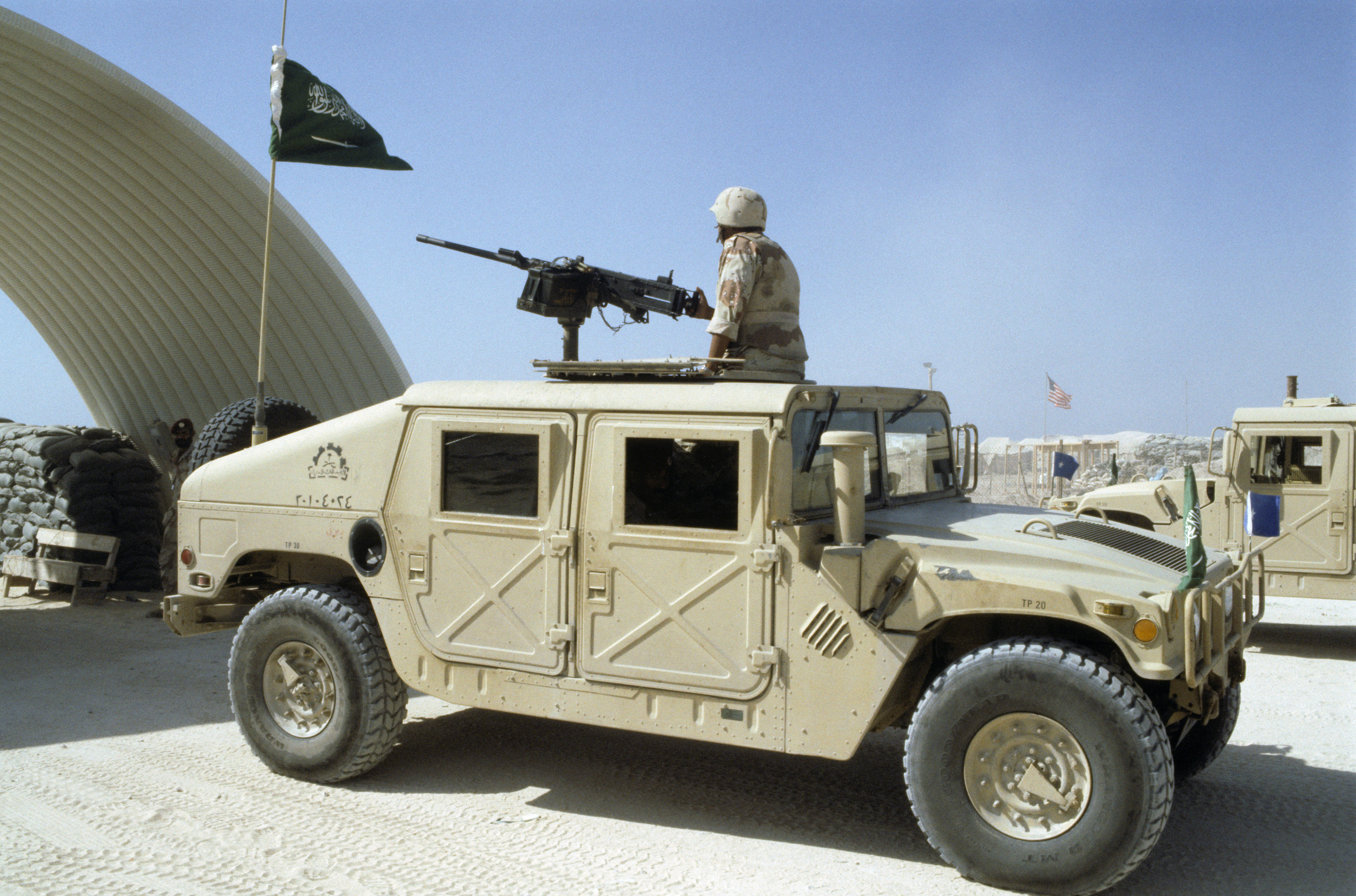
A Humvee belonging to Saudi forces in Mogadishu in 1993.

Throughout history, the infantry soldier has been regarded as a crucial pillar of warfare, particularly during the Islamic period, where infantry played a vital role in the numerous victories achieved during Islamic conquests. As a result, the infantry soldier became a fundamental component of the army and served as the foundational nucleus from which land forces were developed.

The actual inception of the infantry branch can be traced back to the formation of an army consisting of sixty men—akin to what is commonly referred to today as a squad—led by King Abdulaziz Al Saud during the campaign to capture Riyadh on the January 15th, 1902.

==== Armored units ====
Armored forces are regarded as one of the most crucial pillars of modern armies due to their firepower, shock resistance, and armor thickness. Over the past eighty years, these forces have undergone developments. The armored branch, or cavalry, has historically paralleled the infantry as an ancient military unit.

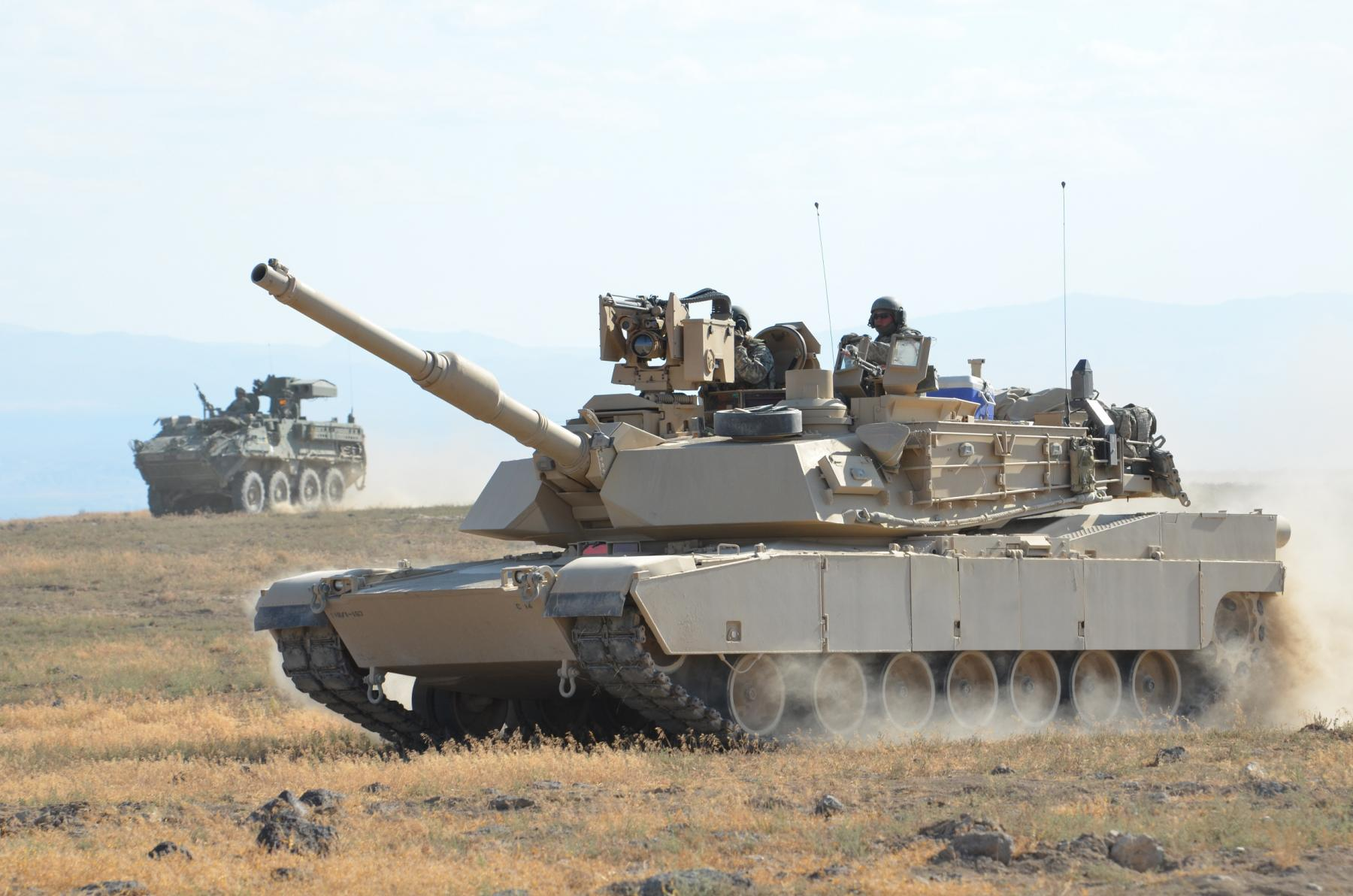
M1 Abrams Tank.

In the Saudi Arabian Army, the inception of armored forces began in 1929 when King Abdulaziz Al Saud ordered the establishment of the Directorate of Military Affairs, laying the groundwork for the regular Saudi military. By 1934, as the regular forces expanded significantly, the necessity arose to form a Defense Agency alongside the Directorate of Military Affairs. At that time, the army comprised three branches: infantry, artillery, and cavalry, marking the first official formation of armored forces.

The nucleus of the armored branch was established with small armored units based in Taif. The first command of the modern armored forces was officially created on September 1, 1957 under the name of Cavalry Command. This command remained in place until 1967, when a project office was established to oversee the modernization and development of armored units, introducing the latest equipment of the time, including various French weapons. Prince Abdulrahman bin Faisal bin Abdulaziz was appointed to manage this office.

On May 1, 1972, the project office was merged with the Cavalry Command, and the name was changed to Armored Forces. In 1991, then Major Khalid bin Bandar bin Abdulaziz was tasked with overseeing the development and modernization of armored units, introducing the American M1A2 tank and the Swiss Piranha armored vehicle into service.

Later, he became the commander of the Armored Forces with the rank of Brigadier General, continuing efforts to develop and modernize all units and formations within the Royal Saudi Land Forces. This included equipping them with the latest armored vehicles globally and training officers and personnel in their combat and technical use to keep pace with advancements in the field, ensuring their effectiveness in fulfilling operational missions. The armored branch continues to witness rapid development, benefiting from superior training capabilities and equipment. Since its inception, it has focused on nurturing young leaders by creating training opportunities with the latest equipment both within the Kingdom and abroad.

==== Parachute units ====
The Parachute Units and Special Security Forces hold a distinguished status within the Royal Saudi Land Forces. The members are meticulously selected from an elite group. They are then trained under challenging conditions.

==== Artillery ====
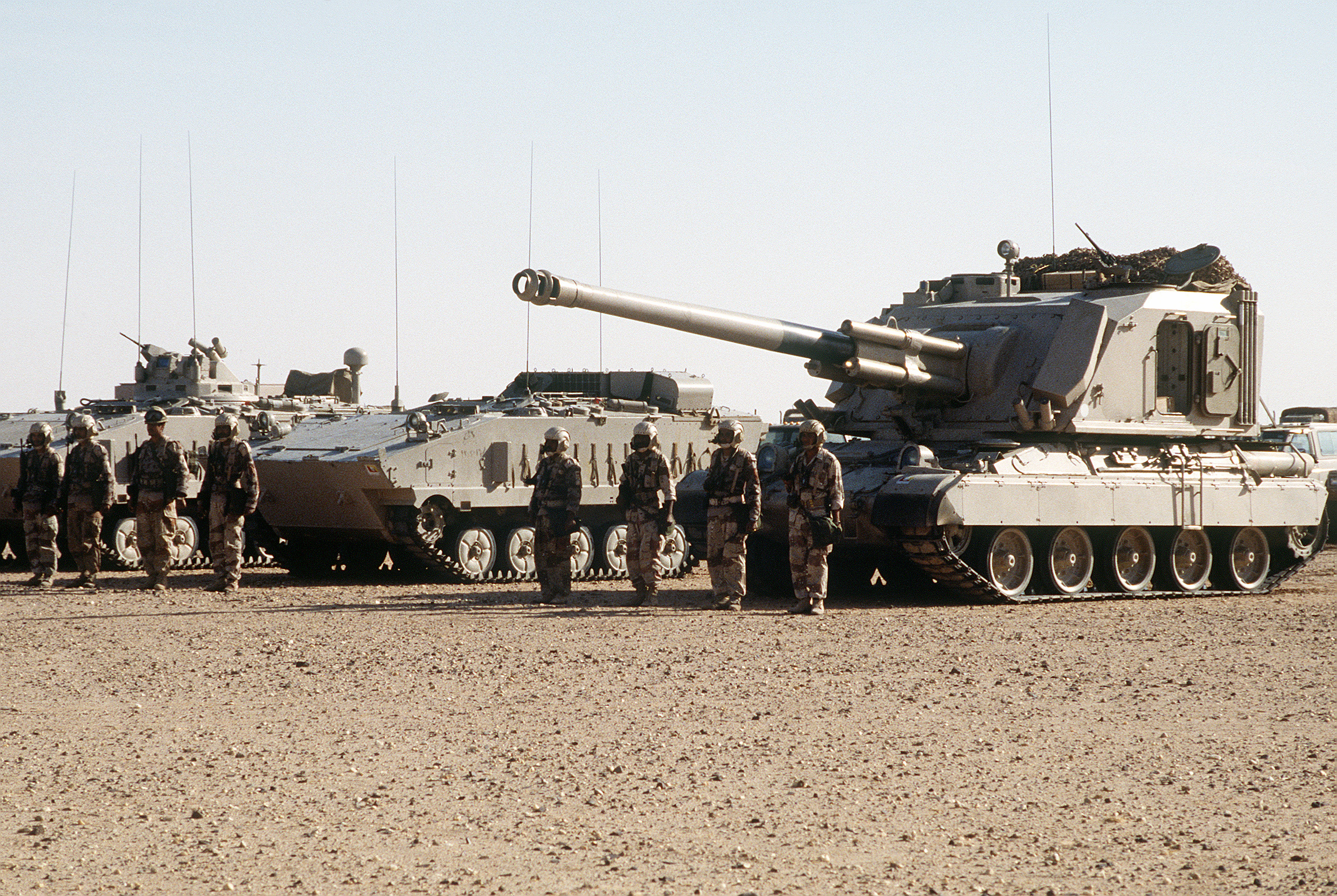
AMX-30 AuF1.

Through the battles fought by King Abdulaziz Al Saud to establish the Kingdom of Saudi Arabia and unify its territories, he successfully seized several bronze cannons from the Ottoman Empire, which were utilized as artillery pieces rather than organized units or formations. In 1930, His Majesty ordered the establishment of the Directorate of Military Affairs, marking the inception of the first nucleus of the regular Saudi Arabian Army. By 1934, the regular forces had grown sufficiently to necessitate the formation of a Defense Agency alongside the Directorate of Military Affairs, which comprised three branches: Infantry, Artillery, and Cavalry.

==== Signal units ====
The Signal Corps plays a crucial role in maintaining and securing communication lines within the land forces, ensuring effective communication for both the General Staff and associated administrations during peacetime and wartime. It is also responsible for developing various communication methods that align with modern military communication technologies on a global scale. The foundation of the Signal Corps can be traced back to the unification of the Kingdom of Saudi Arabia under the reign of its founding king, Abdulaziz bin Abdulrahman Al Saud.

==== Engineers units ====
The Royal Saudi Engineers Corps is a vital branch of modern warfare, facilitating the movement of ground forces while impeding enemy operations. Utilizing advanced equipment and technology, the Corps is responsible for constructing bridges, developing roads in rugged mountainous terrain, detecting and clearing contaminated areas, laying minefields, and creating pathways to enable ground forces to achieve their objectives. Its effectiveness has been demonstrated in conflicts, including the Arab-Israeli War in 1973 and the liberation of Kuwait in 1990.

The origins of the Engineers Corps date back to approximately 1943 when the Construction Division was established to maintain army buildings, initially based in Taif. In 1947, the division was renamed the Royal Saudi Engineers Corps. By 1954, the Corps was relocated to Riyadh, aligning with the transfer of the Ministry of Defense and Aviation, and became a supporting branch under the Logistics and Supply Department.

In 1955, the first Engineer Regiment was formed in Taif, and in 1960, the Engineers Corps was restructured into a combat support unit, which included the Corps Command, an Engineering Division in Riyadh, the Engineers School in Taif, regional engineer branches, and the Engineer Regiment in Taif. Recognizing the importance of the Engineers Corps in battlefield support, its structure was reviewed in 1966, resulting in the addition of heavy engineering equipment to its field units and companies.

By 1971, several engineer units had been established throughout the Kingdom, including bomb disposal units and firefighting teams. The transition to mechanized units occurred in 1977. In 1982, the Corps began incorporating medium gap bridges, tank transportable bridges, portable road and airport mats, mine-laying equipment, mine detection devices, breach-opening tools, and engineer tanks designed for clearing obstacles and fortifications.

Development of the Corps continued, and in early 1997, a new administration was established to address threats posed by weapons of mass destruction, culminating in the formation of a laboratory dedicated to this purpose at the Logistics and Supply Base in Al-Kharj on June 18th, 2007. The evolution of the Engineers Corps remains ongoing, with several future projects aimed at enhancing its capabilities to keep pace with advancements in ground forces.

==== Attribution units ====
===== Maintenance unit =====
The Maintenance Corps is a vital branch of the Royal Saudi Ground Forces, responsible for ensuring the operational readiness of weapons, equipment, devices, and vehicles under various conditions. Its mandate encompasses preventive maintenance, direct maintenance, general maintenance, and servicing at primary bases, all performed with a focus on high efficiency.

The origins of the Maintenance Corps can be traced back to the reign of King Abdulaziz, which began with small workshops that addressed the needs of the time. In 1949, a new formation was established under the Logistics and Supply Department, known as the Assistant Logistics and Supply Department for Maintenance and Transport. The Transport Corps was subsequently separated from the Maintenance Corps in 1955.

Despite this separation, the Maintenance Corps continued to fulfill its technical responsibilities, particularly in supplying the Saudi Arabian Army with modern equipment, vehicles, and spare parts. In 1963, a program was initiated to manage military vehicles, leveraging the expertise of the U.S. Army Corps of Engineers. An agreement was established to regulate the maintenance of weapons, vehicles, and the supply of spare parts.

In 1966, the Maintenance Corps became the first in Saudi Arabia to introduce computer technology for the benefit of the Ground Forces, automating technical supply operations, including the procurement of primary materials, spare parts, and technical documentation. In July 1968, an IBM 360 computer was installed in the supply department, marking the transition to a centrally managed automated system overseen by the Maintenance Corps Command. Initially, computer usage was limited to technical supply operations and select administrative tasks, serving the various branches of the Ground Forces in terms of maintenance and supply.

Today, the Maintenance Corps is responsible for all supply management operations related to the maintenance of weapons, equipment, vehicles, and machinery within the Ground Forces, ensuring their continued functionality in all operational environments. The Corps also focuses on the development and training of technical personnel, including officers, enlisted soldiers, and civilian employees, to enhance its operational capabilities.

==== Catering unit ====
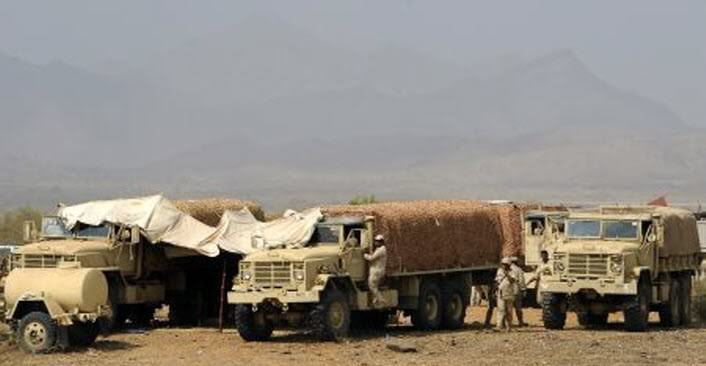
Trucks to transport supplies.

The Supply Corps is tasked with providing a wide range of supplies to all units of the Ground Forces and delivering administrative support to combat formations during military operations.

The origins of the Supply Corps in the Saudi military can be traced back to a supply detachment established to support brigades in specific military areas. As the Ground Forces expanded, a Supply and Logistics Department was created in 1949 in Riyadh. By 1957, the first technical and administrative formation of the corps was established in Riyadh, known as the Supply and Logistics Command, to align with the comprehensive development of the Saudi Arabian Army.

On December 14, 1972, the corps underwent reorganization, leading to the creation of several branches in various military regions. This reorganization took effect on May 1, 1985. The last amendment to the Supply Corps organization occurred on May 1, 1990, after which the name was officially changed to the "Supply Corps" on May 1, 1993.

Today, the Supply Corps is responsible for fulfilling the diverse supply needs of Ground Forces formations and units, including rations, clothing and gear, office and household equipment, fuel, personal requirements, ammunition, construction materials, finished products, medical supplies, spare parts, and non-military support materials. This broad scope ensures that military operations are adequately supported and that personnel are well-equipped to fulfill their missions.

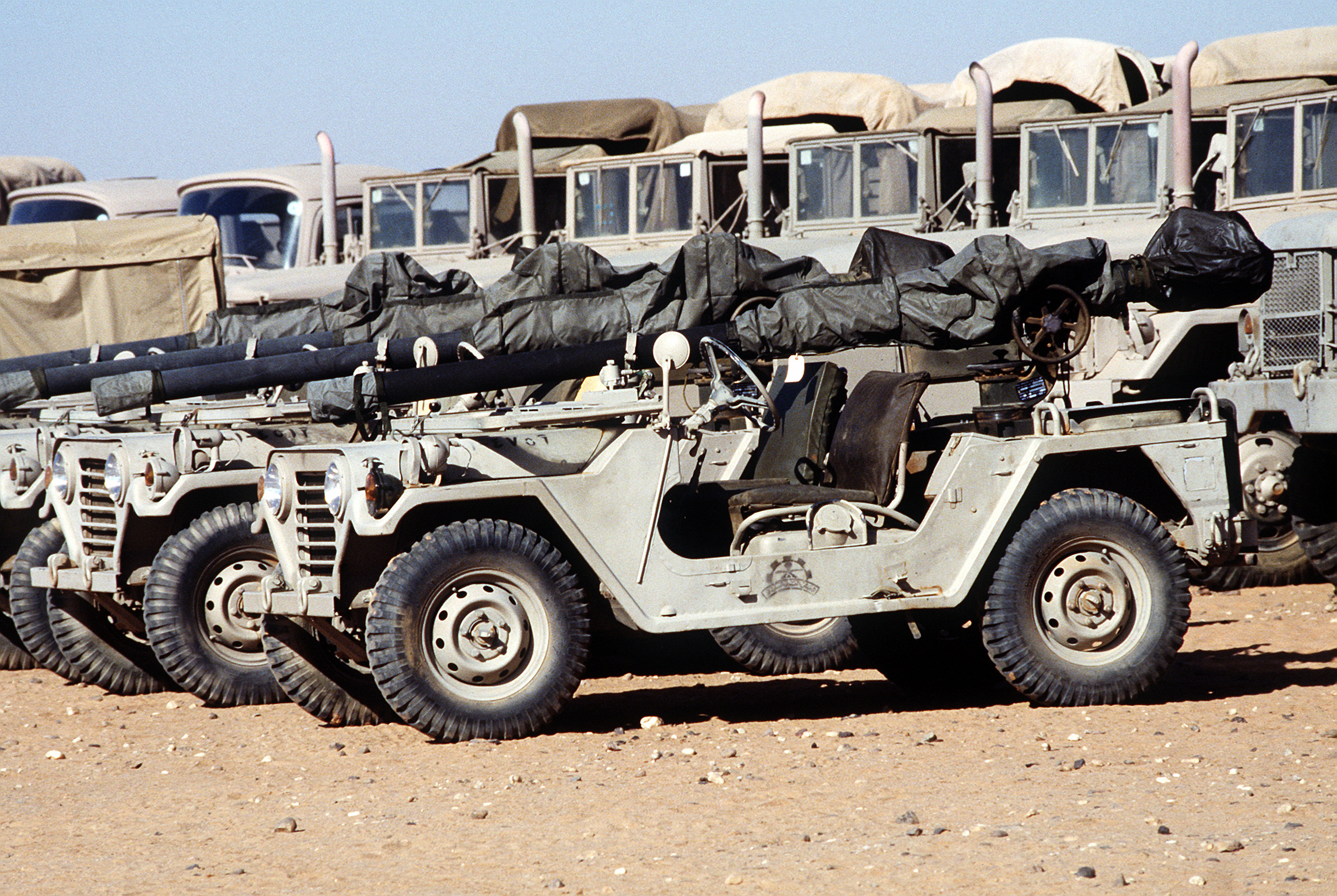
The Royal Saudi Land Forces' Jeeps during the Second Gulf War in 1990.

===== Transportation unit =====
The Transportation Corps is an essential branch of the Royal Saudi Land Forces, tasked with the critical responsibility of securing the transportation of personnel, equipment, weapons, and administrative logistics, along with various types of supplies. The corps plays a role in military operations by ensuring the efficient movement of resources and personnel across diverse operational environments.

===== Aviation Corps =====
The Aviation Corps of the Royal Saudi Land Forces has evolved through various historical phases, establishing itself as one of the most critical combat arms within the Land Forces. This development can be largely attributed to the initiatives of Prince Sultan bin Abdulaziz, the Crown Prince, Deputy Prime Minister, Minister of Defense and Aviation, and Inspector General, along with his deputy, Prince Abdulrahman bin Abdulaziz.

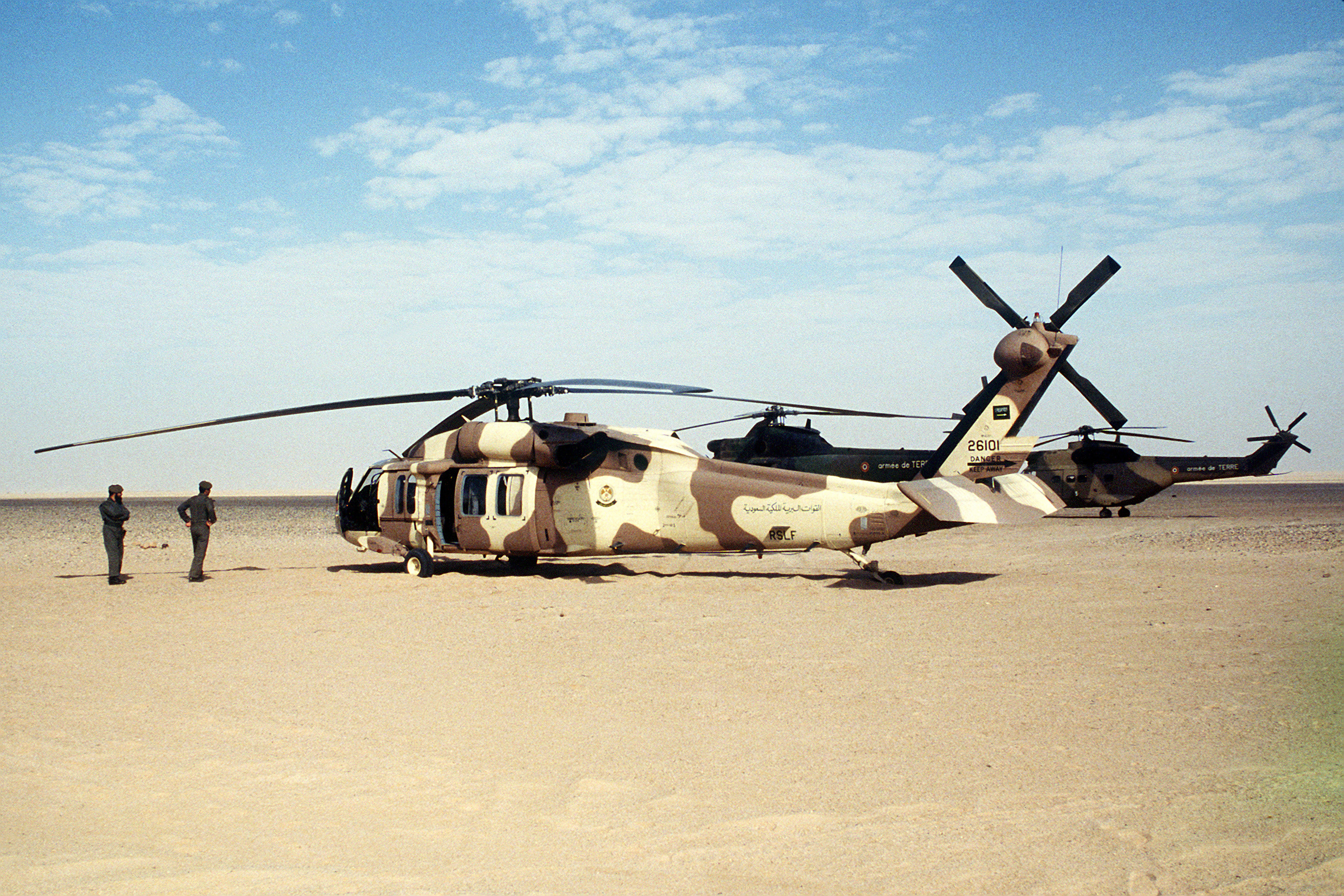
Black Hawk helicopter belonging to the Royal Saudi Land Forces Aviation Corps.

The Land Forces Operations Authority significantly contributed to the establishment of the Aviation Corps by sending a group of Land Forces officers to the United States to study rotary-wing aviation. On January 9, 1980, approval was granted to create the Aviation Project Office within the Land Forces Operations, alongside the acquisition of advanced helicopters for the Aviation Corps.

A milestone in the development of aviation within the Land Forces occurred on August 1, August 1, 1982, when the Aviation Project Office was transformed into the Army Aviation Command to accommodate its expanding scope and responsibilities. Subsequently, on July 1, 1997, the command was renamed the Land Forces Aviation Command, reflecting its enhanced operational role within the Saudi military framework.

=== Academic facilities ===
==== Institutes ====
- Military Language Institute
- Royal Technical Institute
- Royal Infantry Institute
- Royal Armored unit Institute

==== Centers ====
- Paratroopers and Special Security Forces Center and School
- Royal Maintenance Corps Center and School
- Royal Artillery Center and School
- Military Aviation Center and School
- Royal Signal Corps Center and School
- Royal Quartermaster Corps Center and School
- Royal Corps of Engineers Center and School
- Royal Transport Corps Center and School
- Driving Training Centers
- Military Management School
- Weapons of Mass Destruction Prevention School

== Officers and soldiers ==
=== Military ranks ===
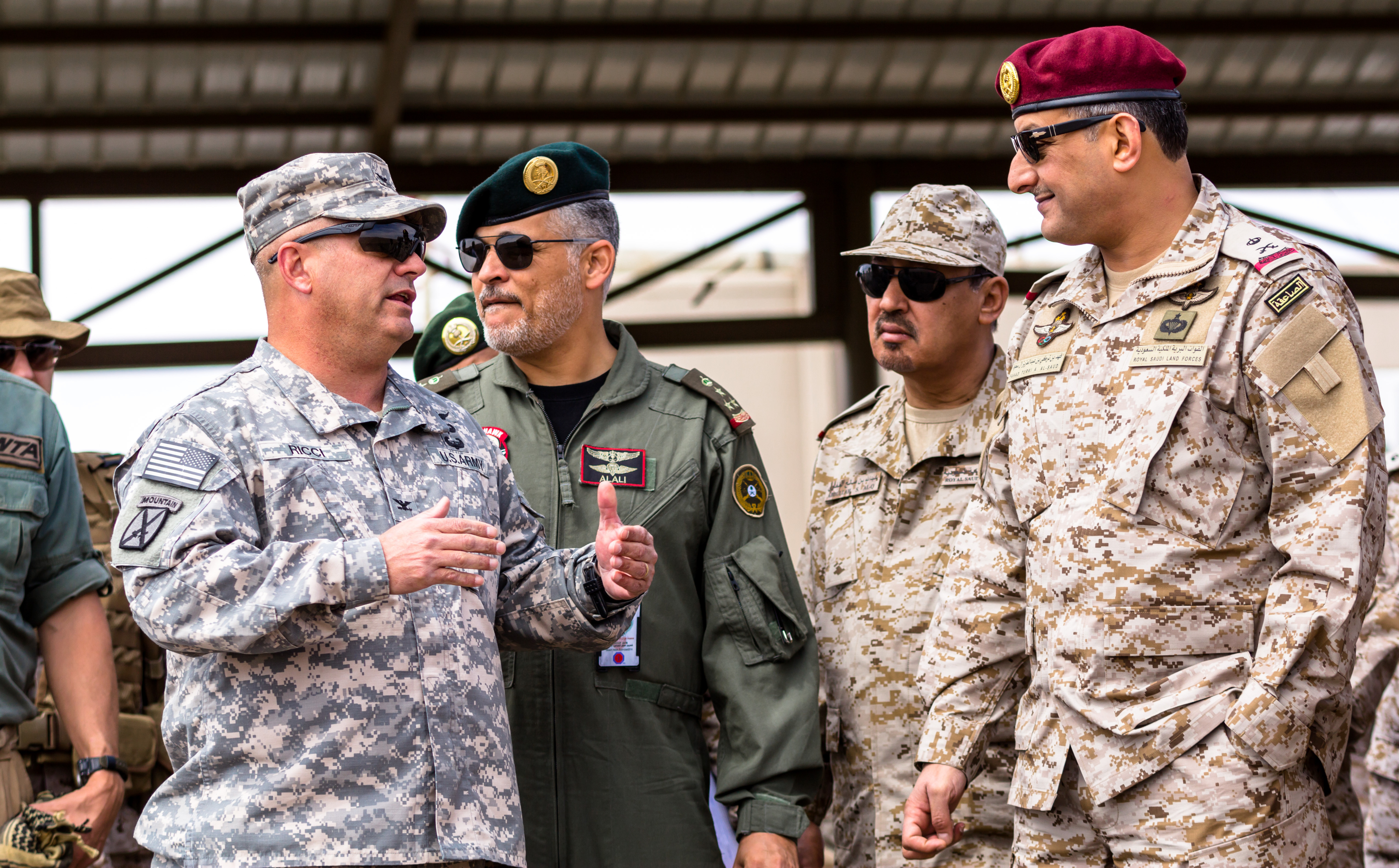
General (Staff) Fahd bin Turki Al Saud

Military unit	General / flag officers				Senior officers			Junior officers		
Military unit	Fariq 'awal	Fariq	Liwa	Amid	Aqid	Muqaddam	Ra'id	Naqib	Mulazim awwal	Mulazim
Administrative										
Field										
Fighter										

=== Other ranks ===
Military unit	Senior NCOs				Junior NCOs	Enlisted	
Military unit	Rayiys ruqaba'	Raqib 'awal	Raqib	Wakil raqib	Earif	Jundiun awwal	Jundiun
Administrative							No insignia
Field							No insignia
Fighter							No insignia

=== Military uniform ===
==== Military hats ====
Royal Saudi Land Forces Hats
Military police cap	Formal hat	Special Forces Hat

==== Camouflage uniform ====
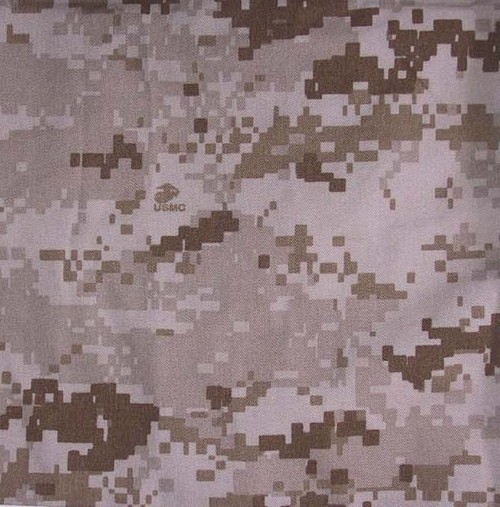
Royal Saudi Land Forces Digital Camouflage.

== See also ==
- Saudi Arabian National Guard
- Armed Forces of Saudi Arabia
- General Staff Presidency
