= Saudi Arabian Military Forces =

Military forces of the Kingdom of Saudi Arabia

- القوات العسكرية السعودية
- Emblem of the Military Forces
- Founded: 22 February 1727; 299 years ago.
- Current form: 13 January 1902; 124 years ago.
- Service branches: Saudi Arabian Armed Forces; Saudi Arabian National Guard; Saudi Arabian Royal Guard; Saudi Arabian Border Guard; Saudi Arabian Emergency Force; Special Security Forces; Special Security Unit
- Headquarters: Riyadh

Leadership
- Supreme Commander: King Salman

Personnel
- Military age: 17
- Conscription: No
- Active personnel: 480,700
- Deployed personnel: 11,200 (2015 est.): Bahrain 14 March 2011 Yemen 26 March 2015 Djibouti 15 October 2015

Expenditure
- Budget: US$48.5 billion (9th)

Industry
- Domestic suppliers: KACST; SAMIC; SAMI; PSATRI; SAEC
- Foreign suppliers: Australia; Brazil; Canada; China; Czech Republic; France; Germany; Indonesia; Italy; Japan; South Korea; Netherlands; Poland; Russia; Singapore; South Africa; Sweden; Taiwan; Turkey; Ukraine; United Kingdom; United States

Related articles
- History: List of Wars; Top leaders
- Ranks: Military ranks of Saudi Arabia

The Saudi Arabian Military Forces (SAMF) (Note: (Arabic: القوات العسكرية العربية السعودية, romanized: Al-Quwwat al-Askariyah Arabīyah as-Su’ūdiyah)) is the collective term for all military forces of Saudi Arabia. Each branch operates independently under different ministries or chains of command.

The SAMF comprises the Saudi Arabian Armed Forces (under the Ministry of Defense), the Saudi Arabian National Guard (under the Ministry of National Guard), the Saudi Arabian Border Guard (under the Ministry of Interior), the Saudi Arabian Royal Guard (under the Presidency of the Royal Guard), the Saudi Arabian Emergency Force (under the Presidency of State Security), and the Special Security Unit (affiliated with the General Intelligence Presidency).

== History ==
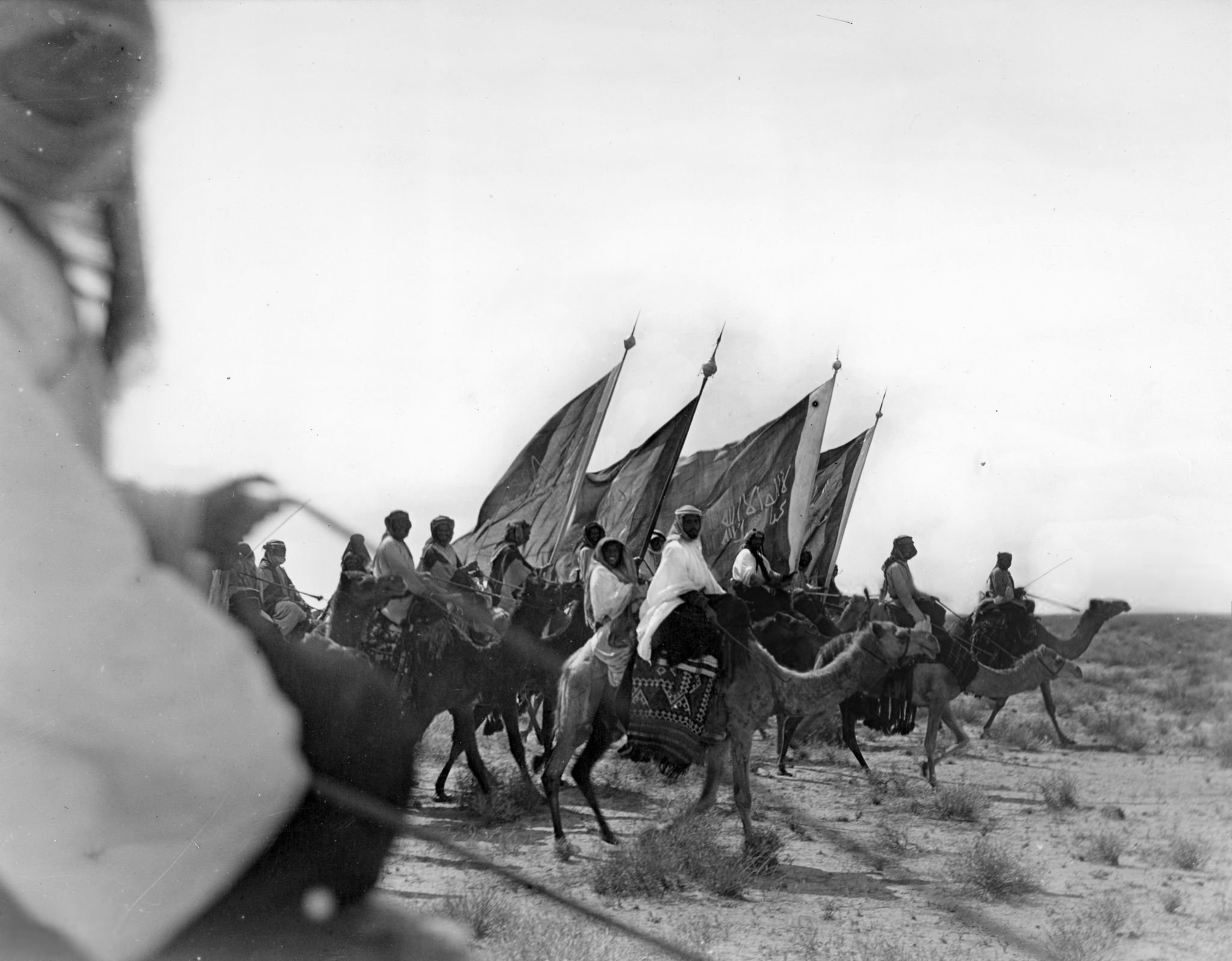
Ikhwan soldiers carry the flags of the Third Saudi State at the Battle of Jarrab in 1915.

The first steps towards building an institutionalised Military Forces for Saudi Arabia began in the 1940s, when Saudi regulars numbered perhaps 1,000–1,500, Gaub saying that officers mostly came from the Ottoman troops who had served the Sharif of Mecca before his being expelled in 1924. A Ministry of Defense was created in 1943; a military school founded in Taif, and the United Kingdom began efforts to try to build a professional force. After the failure of this UK programme, a subsequent U.S. programme which ran from 1951 also failed to reach its objective (the creation for three to five Regimental combat teams). Growth of the armed forces was slowed to some 7,500–10,000 by 1953. Continued enlargement came to a halt in the late 1950s due to internal Saudi power struggles (including two plots by senior officers) and geo-political concerns, namely the Free Officers Revolution in Egypt followed by a brutal Baathist coup in Iraq, wherein expanded post-colonial Arab armies overthrew the domestic monarchies they had sworn allegiance too in 1952 and 1958 respectively. These event led the Saudis to the rational conclusion their own military could potentially pose a greater threat to their line than any of their neighbors. In the decades that followed, though the Kingdom experienced unprecedented economic expansion and modernization; the Royal Armed Forces remained contained. From the late 1950s to the late 1970s, the Saudis did expand and modernize their military but at a stagnate rate, this despite the fact the region was regularly at war. In 1969, South Yemeni forces attacked the Kingdom along the border but were swiftly defeated by Royal and allied forces. When the Yom-Kippur War broke out in 1973, Saudi Arabia used "Oil as a weapon", to aid the Arab cause; this strategy significantly influenced world opinion against Israel though to what extent is remains unclear. Following these successes, the Saudis would pursue only limited increased support for their armed forces in the wake of the Grand Mosque Seizure in 1979. In the 1980s Saudi Arabia became a major source of financial but not military assistance, for the Mujahideen in Afghanistan, and the regime of Saddam Hussein in its war against Revolutionary Iran. The 1991 Gulf War saw the greatest threat to the Kingdom in modern history and the largest deployment of Saudi Armed Forces in history, with all levels of the Saudi military actively participating as part of the U.N. coalition against Iraq.

In 1987, members of the air force, army, and navy used to be mainly recruits from groups of people without a strong identity from the Najd tribal system and people from urban areas.

King Abdullah increasingly moved towards comprehensive military reform following what he considered a failed response by Saudi forces to Houthi incursions in 2009.

In the early 2010s, after almost 20 years of relatively modest increases in military spending, the Saudi government embarked on an unprecedented expansion of the Kingdom's armed forces. This shift in policy was spear-headed primarily by Crown Prince Mohammed bin Salman, who took over as Defense Minister in 2015. It is believed the continued high level expansion of the Saudi Armed Forces was a response to not only short term threats (including incursions by Yemeni rebels and the rise of ISIS) but long term regional strategic concerns, namely the increasing strength of Iran and the uncertain future of America's role in the region.

In 2019, the government of Saudi Arabia stated that women can start working in the military. In the past they could only work in police.

== Defense spending ==
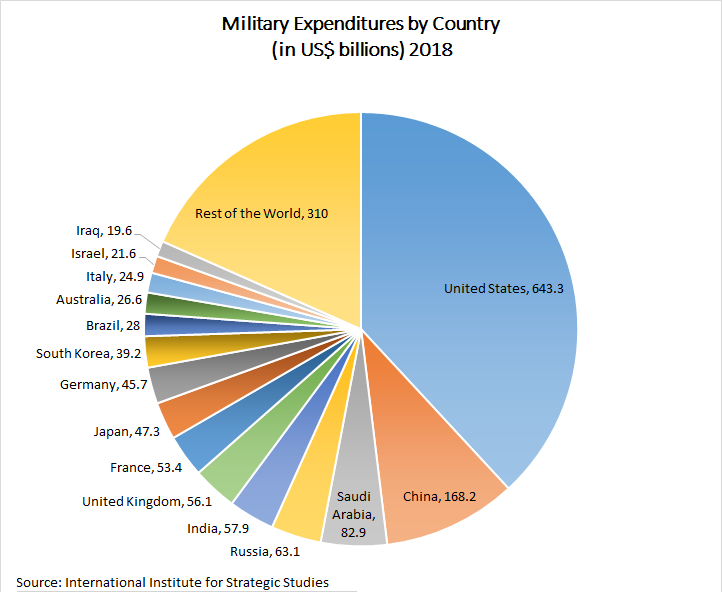
A pie chart showing global military expenditures by country for 2018, in US$ billions, according to the International Institute for Strategic Studies.

Spending on defense and security has increased significantly since the mid-1990s and was about US$67 billion in 2013. Saudi Arabia ranks among the top five nations in the world in government spending for its military, representing about 9% of GDP in 2013. Its modern, high-technology arsenal makes Saudi Arabia among the world's most densely armed nations, with its military equipment being supplied primarily by the United States, France, and Britain. According to SIPRI, in 2010–14 Saudi Arabia became the world's second largest arms importer, receiving four times more major arms than in 2005–2009. Major imports in 2010–14 included 45 combat aircraft from the United Kingdom, 38 combat helicopters from the U.S., 4 tanker aircraft from Spain and over 600 armored vehicles from Canada. Saudi Arabia has a long list of outstanding orders for arms, including 27 more combat aircraft from the United Kingdom, 154 combat aircraft from the U.S. and a large number of armoured vehicles from Canada.

The United States sold more than $80 billion in military hardware between 1951 and 2006 to the Saudi military. In comparison, the Israel Defense Forces received $53.6 billion in U.S. military grants between 1949 and 2007. On 20 October 2010, United States Department of State notified Congress of its intention to make the biggest arms sale in American history—an estimated $60.5 billion purchase by the Kingdom of Saudi Arabia. The package represented a considerable improvement in the offensive capability of the Saudi armed forces. The United States emphasized that the arms transfer would increase "interoperability" with U.S. forces. In the Gulf War, having U.S.-trained Saudi Arabian forces, along with military installations built to U.S. specifications, allowed the U.S. military to deploy in a comfortable and familiar battle environment. This new deal would increase these capabilities, as an advanced American military infrastructure is about to be built. The U.S. government was also in talks with Saudi Arabia about the potential sale of advanced naval and missile-defense upgrades.

The United Kingdom has also been a major supplier of military equipment to Saudi Arabia since 1965.

Canada recently won a contract worth at least US$10 billion to supply the Saudi Arabian army with armored military vehicles.

== Service branches ==
=== Armed Forces ===
The Saudi Arabian Armed Forces are affiliated with the Ministry of Defense and consist of five branches

==== Saudi Arabian Army ====
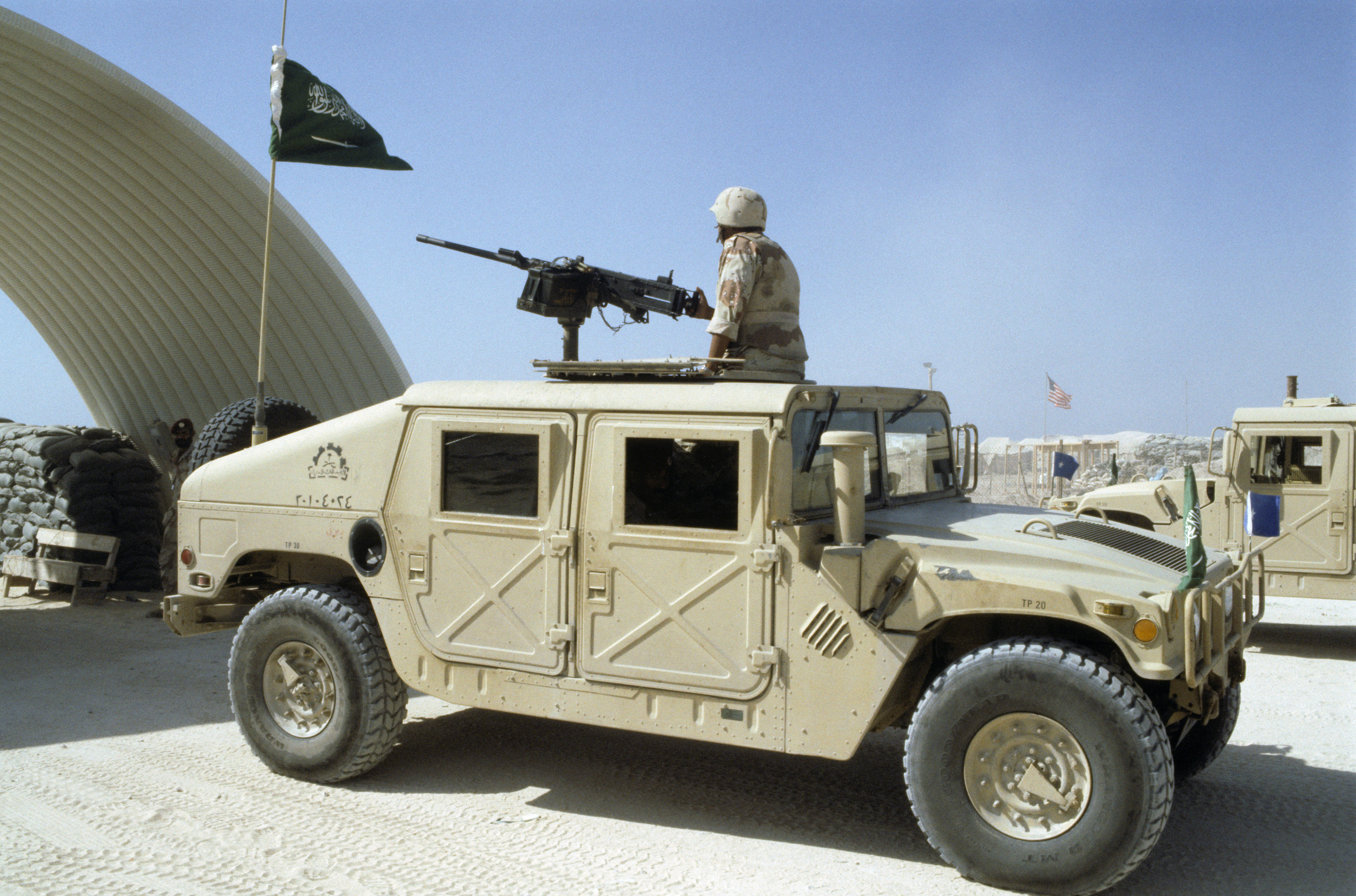
A Saudi Arabian (HMMWV) with a QCB machine gun mounted on top depart for the seaport of Mogadishu in Somalia

The Saudi Arabian Army is composed of three armored brigades, five mechanized brigades, one airborne brigade, one Royal Guard brigade, and eight artillery battalions. The army also has one aviation command with two aviation brigades.

The army's main equipment consists of a combination of French- and U.S.-made armored vehicles: 315 M–1A2 Abrams, 290 AMX–30, and 450 M60A3 main battle tanks; 300 reconnaissance vehicles; 570+ AMX–10P and 400 M–2 Bradley armored infantry fighting vehicles; 3,000+ M113 and 100 Al-Fahd armored personnel carriers, produced in Saudi Arabia; 200+ towed artillery pieces; 110 self-propelled artillery pieces; 60 multiple rocket launchers; 400 mortars; 10 surface-to-surface missiles; about 2,000 antitank guided weapons; about 200 rocket launchers; 450 recoilless launchers; 12 attack helicopters; 50+ transport helicopters; and 1,000 surface-to-air missiles.

In 1996 Saudi Arabia had military cities in the northeast, the King Khalid Military City, at Tabuk, at Dharhran, and at Abha in the southwest. There was a 1996 report that construction of a military city at Jizan, orientated toward Yemen, had begun with Defense Minister Prince Sultan pouring the first concrete on 8 May 1996.

The Library of Congress Country Studies for Saudi Arabia, issued in 1992, noted that the army has been chronically under strength, in the case of some units by an estimated 30 to 50 percent. These shortages have been aggravated by a relaxed policy that permitted considerable absenteeism and by a serious problem of retaining experienced technicians and non-commissioned officers.

==== Royal Saudi Air Force ====
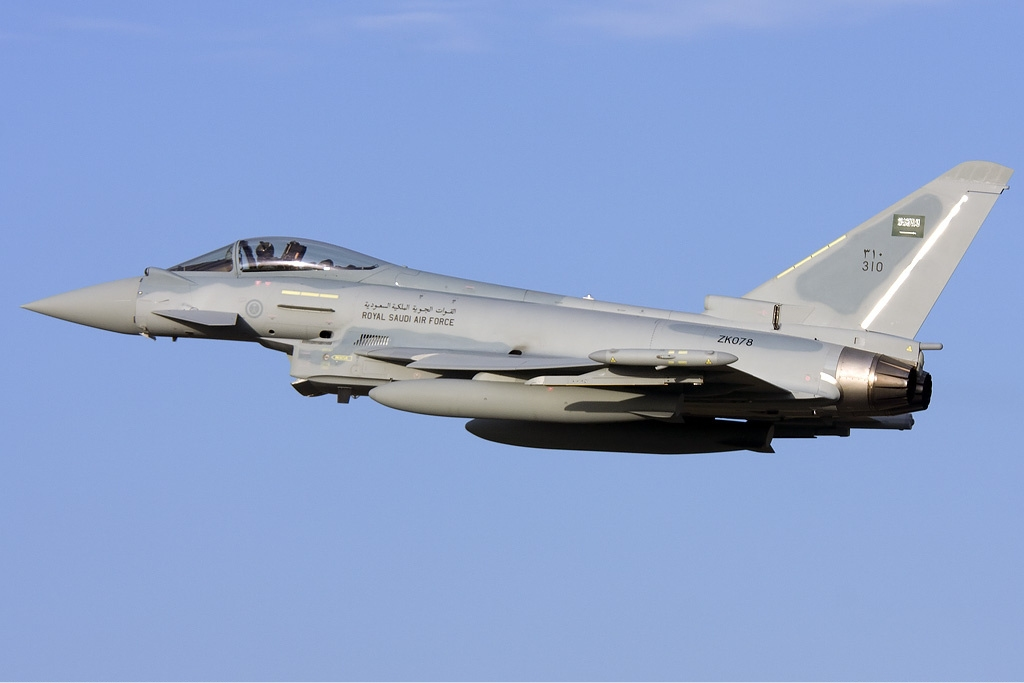
Eurofighter Typhoon

The Royal Saudi Air Force (RSAF) is the aviation branch of the Saudi Arabian Armed Forces.

The RSAF has developed from a largely defensive military force into one with an advanced offensive capability, and maintains the third largest fleet of F-15s after the U.S. and Japanese air forces. The air force is organized in seven fighter/ground-attack squadrons, six fighter squadrons, and seven training squadrons. Saudi Arabia has at least 15 active military airfields.

As of 2011, Saudi Arabia has around 300 combat aircraft. The kingdom's combat aircraft are newly acquired Typhoons and upgraded Tornado IDS, F-15 Eagle and F-15E Strike Eagle fighter planes. Saudi Arabia has a further 80+ F-15 Eagles on order and an option to buy another 72 Typhoons.

==== Royal Saudi Naval Forces ====
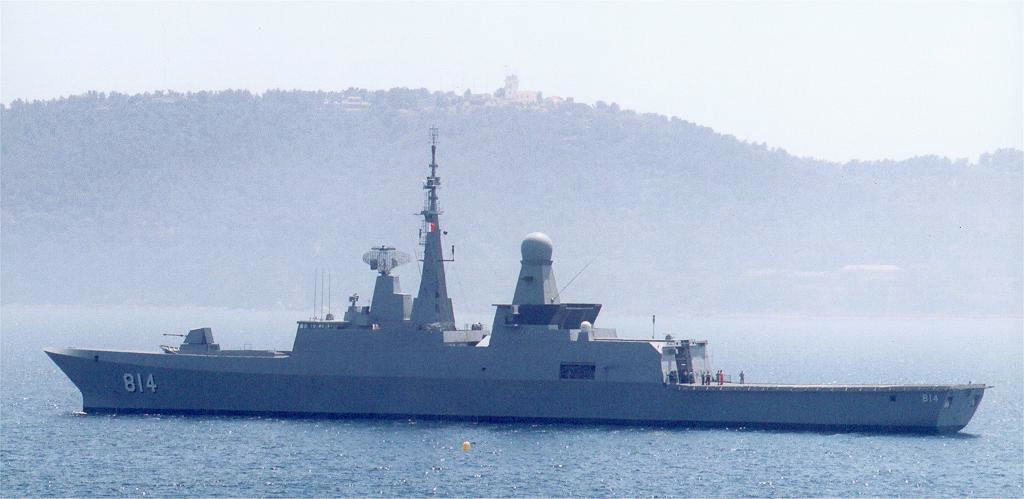
HMS "Makkah", an Al-Riyadh class frigate

The Royal Saudi Naval Forces are the maritime arm of the Saudi Arabian Armed Forces and one of the five service branches of the Ministry of Defense of Saudi Arabia. Its primary role is monitoring and defending the Saudi territorial waters against military or economic intrusion, and participating in international naval alliances.

The navy is divided into two fleets: the Western Fleet has bases in Jeddah, Jizan, and Al-Wajh; the Eastern Fleet has bases in Jubail, Dammam, Ras Mishab, and Ras al Ghar. The marines are organized into one infantry regiment with two battalions.

The navy's inventory includes 11 principal surface combatants, 65 patrol and coastal combatants, 7 mine warfare vessels, 8 amphibious craft, and 7 support and miscellaneous craft. Naval aviation forces have 19 helicopters (armed) serving in naval support.

==== Royal Saudi Air Defense Forces ====
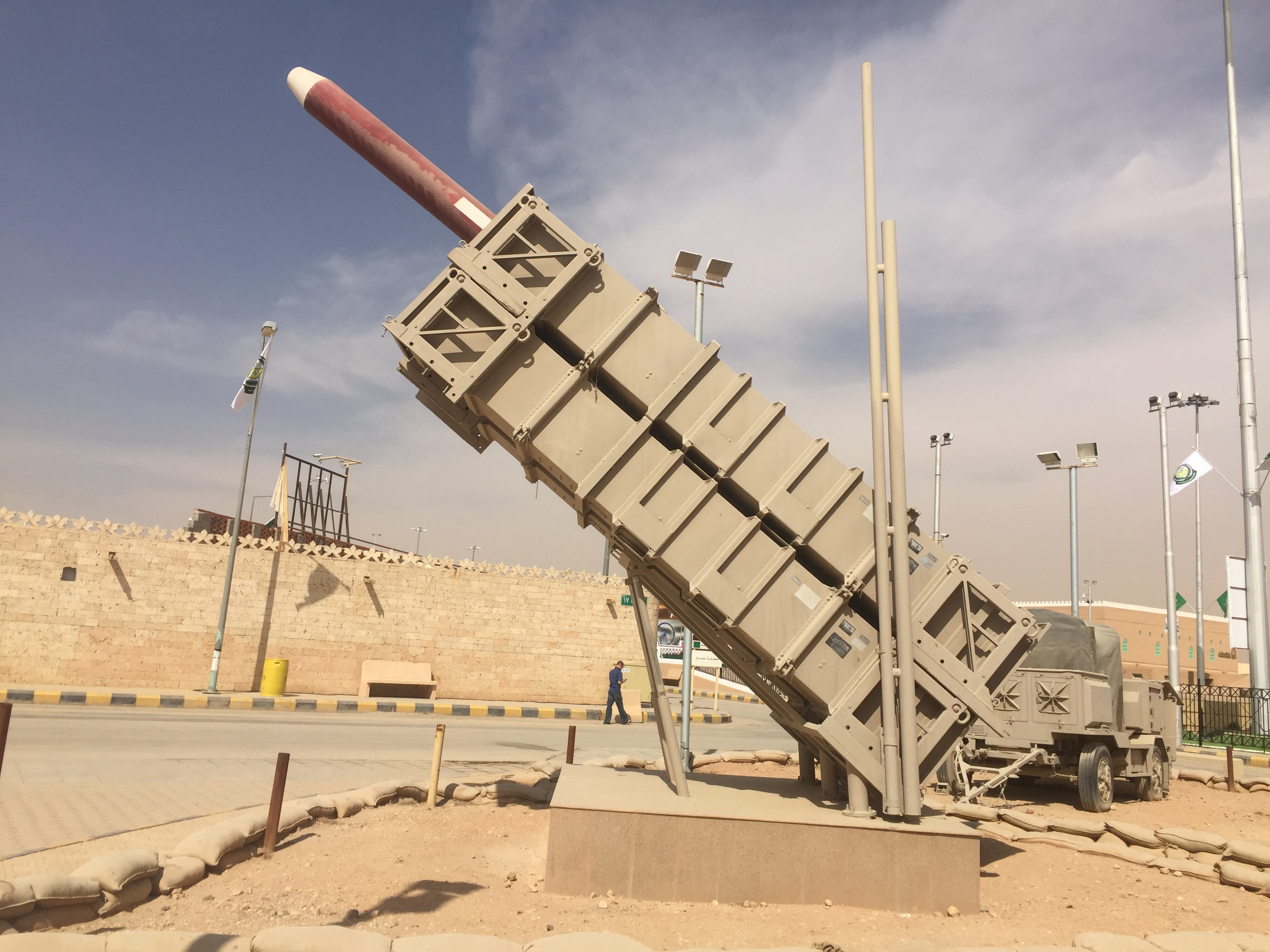
Saudi MIM-104 Patriot on display

The Royal Saudi Air Defense Forces (RSADF) is the aerial defense service branch of the Saudi Arabian Armed Forces. It is fourth of the five service branches of the MOD. It has its HQ in Riyadh, (Note: Air Defense Ministry Building designed by Arthur Erickson Architects with Bing Thom) where there is also an elaborate underground command facility that co-ordinates Arabian Kingdom's advanced "Peace Shield" radar and air defense system, with an estimated 40,000 active duty military personnel in 2015. Along with the Royal Saudi Air Force (RSAF), it has responsibility for securing the skies of Saudi Arabia.

Air Defense was part of the Army until 1981 when it was made a separate service. It operates "Peace Shield" a state-of-the-art radar and air defense system consisting of a Command Operations Center at Riyadh, and main operating bases at Dhahran, Taif, Tabuk, Khamis Mushait and Al-Kharj. The total system includes 164 sites.

The system equipment comprises 17 General Electric AN/FPS-117 long-range 3D radars, 6 Northrop Grumman AN/TPS-43 tactical radars, and Raytheon Improved HAWK air defense missile system.

==== Royal Saudi Strategic Missile Force ====
The Royal Saudi Strategic Missile Forces (RSSMF) is equipped with the Chinese DF-3A (CSS-2) Dongfeng missile sold to Saudi Arabia by China. A conventional high-explosive warhead (2150 kg) variant of the DongFeng 3A Intermediate-Range Ballistic Missile was developed for an export order to Saudi Arabia in 1987. About 30+ missiles and 9~12 launchers were reportedly delivered in 1988, though no known test launch has ever been made in the country. The Strategical Missile Forces is top secret, so there is no open information concerning the budget and personnel. Probably it is separate branch officially called Strategic Missile Forces (guessing by its website URL http://www.smf.gov.sa/).

But RSSMF certainly has one advanced Al-Watah ballistic missile base (found on the satellite images) in the rocky central part of Saudi Arabia, some 200 km south-west of the capital city Riyadh. Two other bases include Al Sulayyil ballistic missile base (the older base located 450 km southwest of Riyadh) and Al Jufayr base (placed 90 km south of Riyadh) share many similarities, suggesting that they share the same role.

=== National Guard ===
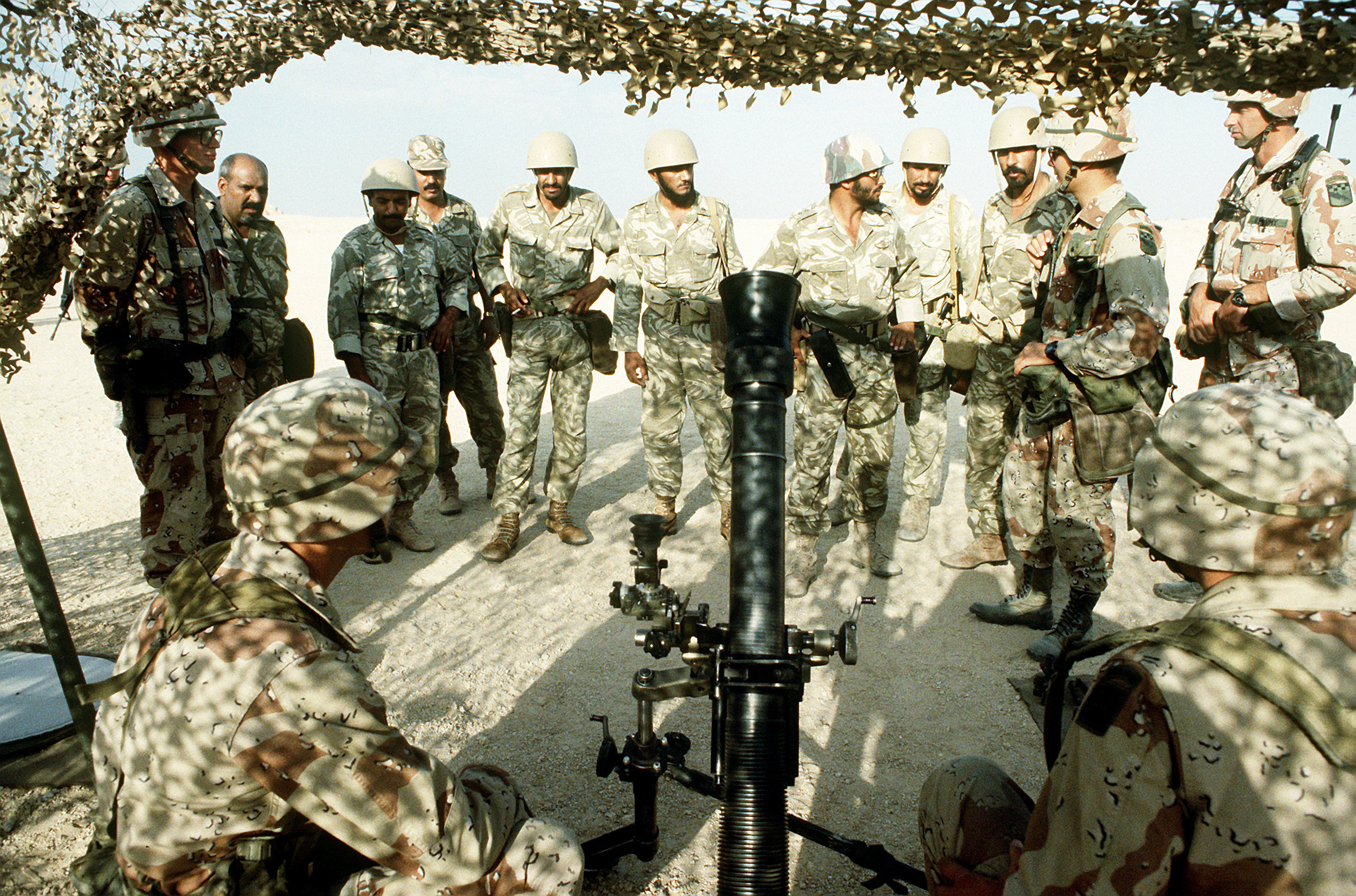
SANG soldiers receiving mortar training from a U.S. soldier

The Saudi Arabian National Guard is independent of the Ministry of Defense and Aviation and is organized into three mechanized infantry brigades, five infantry brigades, and one ceremonial cavalry squadron.

The Saudi Arabian National Guard is not a reserve but a fully operational front-line force and originated out of King Abdulaziz's tribal military-religious force, the Ikhwan. Its modern existence, however, is attributable to it being effectively Abdullah's private army since the 1960s and, unlike the rest of the armed forces, is independent of the Ministry of Defense. The SANG has been a counterbalance to the Sudairi faction in the royal family; Salman of Saudi Arabia, the king, is one of the so-called "Sudairi Seven" and controls the remainder of the armed forces. The SANG is equipped with 100 Saudi-manufactured Al-Fahd infantry fighting vehicles. It has been strengthened by the purchase of US$1 billion worth of new armored vehicles from Canada.

=== Royal Guard ===
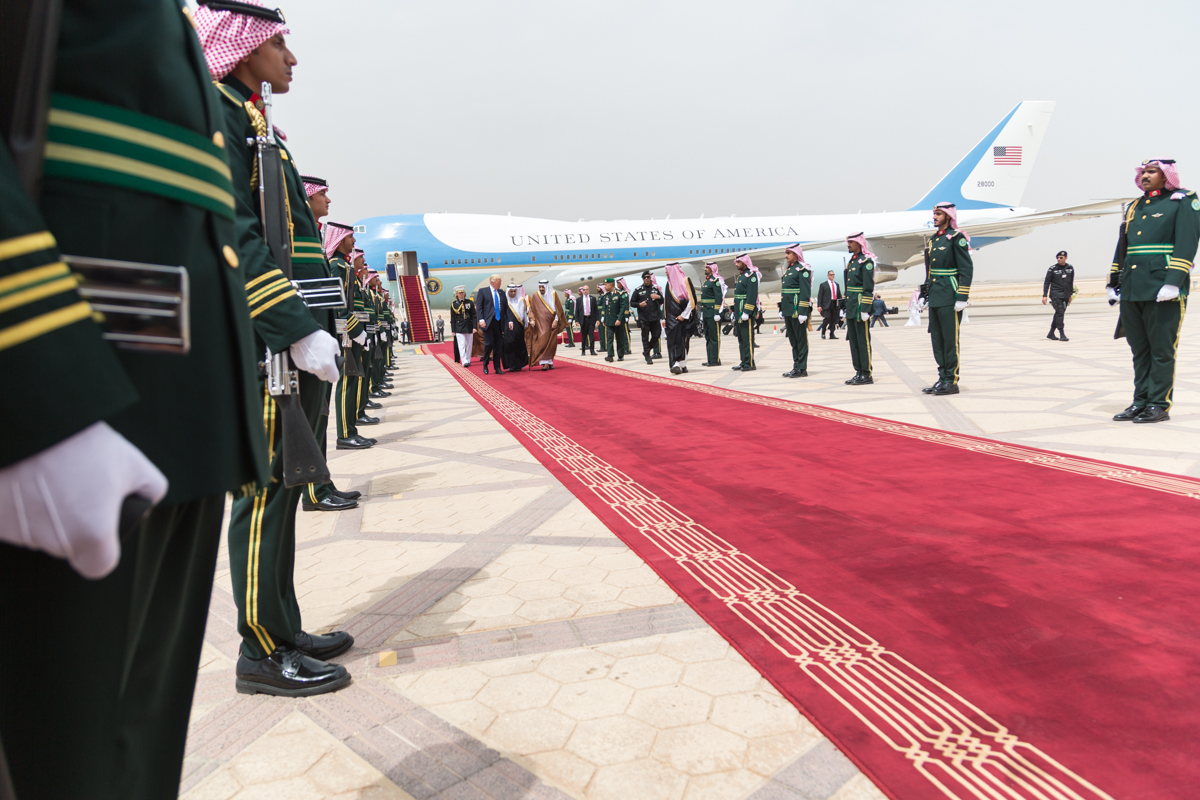
Members of the Saudi Royal Guard Regiment with President Trump and King Salman in May 2017.

The Saudi Arabian Royal Guard Regiment is one of the more visible units . Originally an independent military force, the Royal Guards were incorporated into the Army in 1964. However, the Royal Guards still retained their unique mission of protecting the House of Saud. Units of the Royal Guard protect the King of Saudi Arabia at all times.

The Royal Guards report directly to the king and for security reasons maintain a separate communications network from the regular Army.

Members of the Royal Guard Regiment often wear the flowing white thaub (robe) and white taqiyah and red and white ghutrah (traditional Arab headgear of skullcap and scarf). Royal Guardsmen wear bright green berets when in conventional uniforms.

=== Border Guard ===
The General Directorate of Border Guard is a Saudi agency responsible for guarding land and sea borders of the Kingdom. Awwad Eid Al-Aradi Al-Balawi is the Directorate general of Saudi Arabian Border Guards.

=== State Security ===
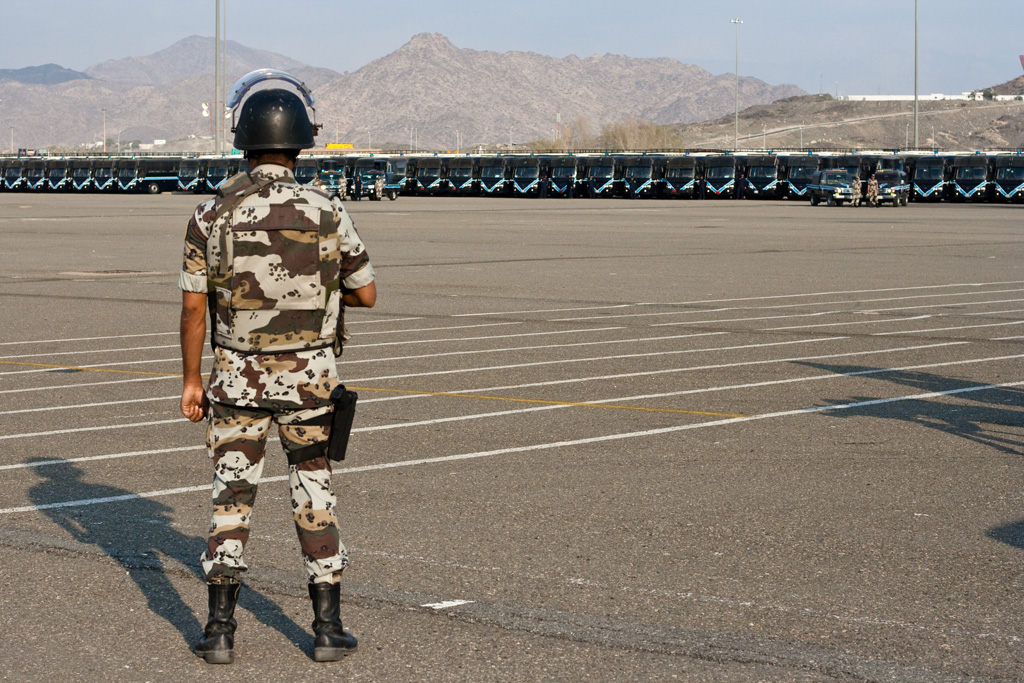
Special Emergency Force during the Hajj season in 2009.

Presidency of State Security is a Saudi Arabian security body created in 2017 by combining the counterterrorism and domestic intelligence services under one roof. The new body will be concerned with all matters related to state security, and will be overseen by the king. The new state security agency is headed by intelligence chief Abdul Aziz bin Mohammed Al-Howairini, who holds the rank of a minister. The following departments were annexed to the new Presidency of State Security: General Investigations, Special Security Force, Special Emergency Force, security aviation, technical affairs, National Information Center, and other departments in charge of combating terrorism, and finance and financial investigation.

=== Intelligence Special Forces ===
The Special Security Unit or the Falcons Unit is a special forces affiliated with the General Intelligence. It was launched at the Intelligence Presidency Institute in Muzahmiyah in 2010, in the presence of the Head of General Intelligence, Prince Muqrin bin Abdulaziz, senior officials in the presidency, and senior military and security leaders.

== Military industry ==
The vast majority of Saudi Arabia's military equipment is imported from European and North American suppliers. However, the Al-Fahd Infantry fighting vehicle and the Al-Faris 8–400 armored personnel carrier, used by Saudi land forces, were manufactured by the Abdallah Al Faris Company for Heavy Industries, based in Dammam.

In addition, domestically produced armored vehicles include the Al-Kaser and Al-Mansour models, as well as the Al-Masmak MRAP, which is designed to provide high levels of protection. The Ashibl 1 and Ashibl 2 are also Saudi-made armored vehicles used by the Royal Saudi Land Forces and specialized units such as Battalion 85. Saudi Arabia has also unveiled the Tuwaiq MRAP.

As part of the objectives of Vision 2030, Saudi Arabia has sought to expand the localization of its military industries. The localization rate of military spending increased from approximately 2% in 2016 to 24.89% by the end of 2024, alongside the establishment of local manufacturing facilities and partnerships with international defense companies such as Lockheed Martin.

Saudi Arabian Military Industries (SAMI) signed a Memorandum of Understanding with Rosoboronexport for the local production of the 9M133 Kornet-EM anti-tank guided missile (ATGM) system, the TOS-1A advanced multiple rocket launcher and AGS-30 automatic grenade launchers with grenades and Kalashnikov AK-103.

== Flags ==
Flag of the Royal Saudi Land Forces. (Ratio: 2:3)

Flag of the Royal Saudi Air Force (Seal). (Ratio: 2:3)

Ensign of the Royal Saudi Air Force (Roundel). (Ratio: 2:3)

Flag of the Royal Saudi Naval Forces. (Ratio: 2:3)

Naval Ensign of Saudi Arabia. (Ratio: 12:25)

Flag of the Royal Saudi Air Defense Force (Ratio: 2:3)

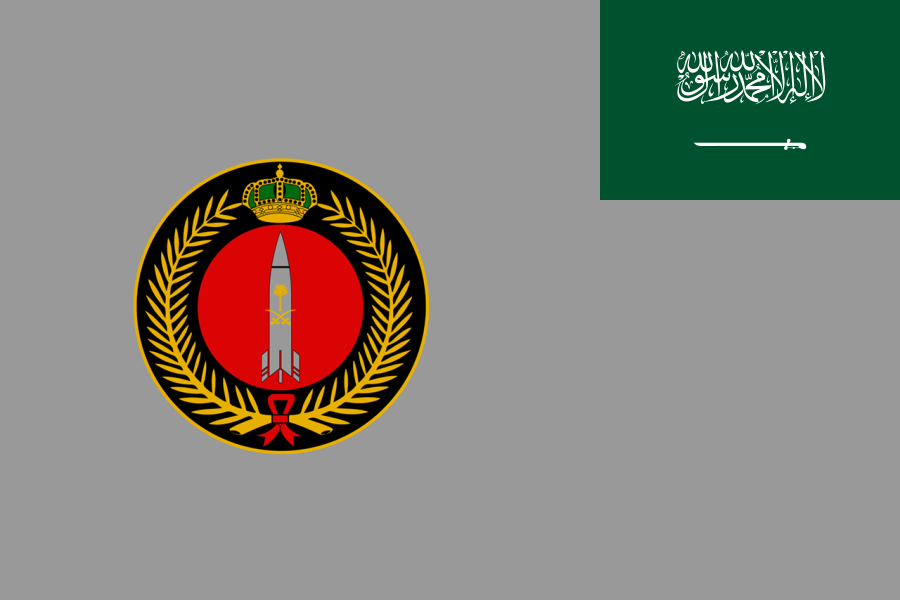
Flag of the Royal Saudi Strategic Missile (Ratio: 2:3)

Special Security Forces (Ratio: 2:3)

== See also ==
- King Khalid Military City
- Nuclear program of Saudi Arabia
- List of wars involving Saudi Arabia
