= List of equipment of the Saudi Arabian Army =

This is a list of equipment of the Saudi Arabian Army currently in service.

== Gear and Attire ==
Infantry Gear
Name	Image	Type	Details
M1 helmet + All-purpose lightweight individual carrying equipment		Combat helmet & Load-bearing equipment	Phased out.
PASGT/MICH/FAST + OTV/SPC		Combat helmet & Bulletproof vest/Plate carrier	Standard issue.
FAST + SPC		Combat helmet & Plate carrier	Used by special forces

Attire & Combat Uniform
Name	Image	Picture	Notes
Disruptive Pattern Material			Phased out
DBDU			
Desert Camouflage Uniform			
MARPAT-style			Standard issue

== Small arms ==
Model	Image	Origin	Type	Caliber	Details
Pistols
SIG Sauer P226		Switzerland	Handgun	9×19mm Parabellum	Standard issue sidearm
Glock		Austria	Handgun	9×19mm Parabellum	Special forces mostly
Submachine guns
Heckler & Koch MP5		West Germany; Saudi Arabia	Submachine gun	9×19mm Parabellum	
Assault rifles
AK-103		Russia; Saudi Arabia	Assault rifle	7.62×39mm	Used by Airborne Units and Special Security Forces in the Saudi Arabian Army. Manufactured by Saudi Arabian Military Industries.
PM md. 90		Romania	Assault rifle	7.62x39mm	
Heckler & Koch G36		Germany; Saudi Arabia	Assault rifle	5.56×45mm NATO	Manufactured by Military Industries Corporation.
FN SCAR-H		Belgium; United States	Battle rifle	7.62×51mm NATO	Used by Airborne Units and Special Security Forces in the Saudi Arabian Army.
Heckler & Koch G3		West Germany; Saudi Arabia	Battle rifle	7.62×51mm NATO	Standard issue rifle of Saudi Arabian Army. Manufactured by MIC.
M4A1 carbine		United States	Assault rifle	5.56×45mm NATO	Used by Special Security Forces in the Saudi Arabian Army.
Steyr AUG		Austria	Assault rifle	5.56×45mm NATO	Former standard assault rifle of the Saudi Arabian Army.
Machine guns
Heckler & Koch MG4		Germany	Light machine gun	5.56×45mm NATO	Standard light machine gun of the Saudi Arabian Army.
Rheinmetall MG3		West Germany	General-purpose machine gun	7.62×51mm NATO	Standard general-purpose machine gun of the Saudi Arabian Army.
FN Minimi		Belgium	Squad automatic weapon	5.56×45mm NATO	
FN MAG		Belgium	General-purpose machine gun	7.62×51mm NATO	
Vektor SS-77		South Africa	General-purpose machine gun	5.56×45mm NATO	
M2 Browning		United States	Heavy machine gun	12.7×99mm NATO	Standard heavy machine gun of the Saudi Arabian Army.
Sniper rifles and designated marksman rifles
Accuracy International AWM		United Kingdom	Sniper rifle	.300 Winchester Magnum	
M107/M107A1		United States	Anti-materiel rifle	12.7×99mm NATO	
AWP (Arctic Warfare Police)		United Kingdom	Sniper rifle	7.62×51mm NATO	
Robar RC-50		United States	Anti-material sniper rifle	12.7 × 99 mm NATO	
Grenade-based weapons
M203		United States	Grenade launcher	40×46mm SR	
AGS-30		Russia; Saudi Arabia	Automatic grenade launcher	40×46mm	Manufactured by Saudi Arabian Military Industries.
Mk 19		United States	Automatic grenade launcher	40×53mm	
Milkor MGL		South Africa	Automatic grenade launcher	40×46mm	
Norinco LG5		China	Anti-materiel sniper rifle/Grenade launcher	40×53mm	Manufactured by Norinco
M67		United States	Hand grenade	64 mm	
Rocket-propelled grenade launchers
RPG-7		Soviet Union	Rocket propelled grenade launcher	40 mm	
C90-CR (M3)		Spain	Rocket-propelled grenade	90 mm	At least 5,000 sold To Saudi Arabian Army in the 1990s.
Portable anti-tank weapons
9M133 Kornet		Russia; Saudi Arabia	Anti-tank guided missile	Tandem high-explosive anti-tank	Manufactured by Saudi Arabian Military Industries.
FGM-148 Javelin		United States	Medium-range anti-tank guided missile	127mm	Standard infantry anti-tank weapon. 20 launchers and 150 missiles.
NLAW		United Kingdom; Sweden	Short-range anti-tank missile system	150mm	In service with Saudi Arabian Army.
RBS 56B BILL 2		Sweden	Semi-automatic command to line of sight anti-tank missile	127mm	
AT-1K Raybolt		South Korea	Anti-tank missile		Used in Yemen.
M47 Dragon		United States	Anti-tank missile	140 mm	
APILAS		France	Anti-tank missile	112 mm	
Mounted anti-tank weapons
HOT		France	Anti-tank missile	Tandem charge high-explosive anti-tank	HOT and HOT-2 delivered in 1989 and 1997 for use on AMX-10.
AGM-114 Hellfire		United States	Anti-tank missile	High-explosive anti-tank	Used on AH-64D and AH-6s.
BGM-71 TOW; BGM-71C ITOW; BGM-71D TOW-2; BGM-71E TOW-2A		United States	Anti-tank missile	150mm	Standard issue to Saudi Arabian Army.

== Artillery ==
Model	Image	Origin	Type	Details
Self-propelled howitzers (380)
M109		United States	155mm self-propelled howitzer	110 M109A1B/A2 as of 2024; 177 M109A6 ordered in April 2018
CAESAR		France	155 mm self-propelled howitzer	156
AMX-30 AU-F-1		France	155mm self-propelled howitzer	60
PLZ-45		China	155mm self-propelled howitzer	54
Towed Howitzers (557)
M777A2 Howitzer		United States	155mm towed howitzer	90
M101A1		United States	105mm towed howitzer	132
GIAT LG1		France	105mm towed howitzer	91
M198		United States	155mm towed howitzer	118
FH70		United Kingdom	155mm towed howitzer	76
M114A2		United States	155mm towed howitzer	50
Multiple Rocket Launchers (327)
Astros II		Brazil	180mm multiple rocket launcher	77
TOS-1A		Russia	220mm multiple rocket launcher	34
M270 Multiple Launch Rocket System		United States	227mm multiple rocket launcher	180
K239 Chunmoo		South Korea	227/239 mm multiple rocketlauncher	36

== Vehicles ==
Model	Image	Origin	Variant	Quantity	Details
Tanks (1,085)
M1 Abrams		United States	M1A2S	575	Saudi Arabia bought 373 M1A2 tanks, with further 69 more M1A2S tanks ordered on 8 January 2013 and delivered by 31 July 2014. Later Saudi Arabia decided to upgrade all of M1A2 variants to M1A2S configuration. 153 M1A2S on order since 9 August 2016. 20 were lost in Yemen.
M60 Patton		United States	M60A3	370	910 M60A1 RISE (250 transferred to North Yemen). Many of these were upgraded to M60A3s during the 1990s.
AMX-30		France	AMX-30SA	140	In reserve.
Armoured reconnaissance vehicles
Panhard AML		France	AML-60 AML-90	300	
Infantry fighting vehicles
M2 Bradley		United States	M2A2	380	Principal infantry fighting vehicle of the Saudi Army.
AMX-10P		France		380	500 were bought from France in 1974; most are now stored as a reserve.
VAB		France	VAB Mk3	100	
Al-Fahd 8*8 APC/IFV & AFRV		Saudi Arabia	AF-40-8-1 (40mm turret) & AF-40-8-2 (105mm turret AFRV)	?	Developed and manufactured by the Abdallah Al Faris Company for Heavy Industries, it was the first armored fighting vehicle produced in the nation.
Armoured personnel carriers
M113		United States	M113A1; M113A3	1,190	
Panhard M3		France	M3	150	
Armoured utility vehicles/MRAPs
Otokar Cobra II		Turkey		N/A	
Didgori Medevac		Georgia	Didgori-2	100	Armored medical evacuation vehicle. Saudi Arabia ordered 100+ Didgori Medevac from Georgia in 2016.
Shibl 2		Saudi Arabia	Shibl 2	N/A	A small number of Shibl 2 vehicles were delivered to the Yemeni army to take part in the Midi and Harad offensives.
Sherpa Light		France	Scout	100	
Oshkosh M-ATV		United States		1800+	Saudi Arabia began negotiations for an order for an undisclosed number of M-ATVs. Several dozen have been destroyed in Yemen. With many being donated to Pro-Hadi forces and subsequently getting destroyed in fighting.
Terradyne Gurkha		Canada		N/A	
URO VAMTAC		Spain		30	
CUCV II		United States		200+	
Humvee		United States	M997 HMMWV; M998 HMMWV; M1026 HMMWV; M1151 HMMWV	2500	Vehicles were sold to Saudi Arabia by the United States under the Foreign Military Sales program.
TUWAIQ-2		Saudi Arabia		1500+	
Anti-tank vehicles
AMX-10P		France		90+	
VCC-1 ITOW		United States		200	
M-ATV		United States		N/A	Equipped with MILAN ATGM
Armoured recovery vehicles
M88		United States	M88A1	122	Armoured recovery vehicle. The potential sale of a further 20 was announced in August 2016.
ACV ARV		United States		8	
AMX-10EHC		France		N/A	
AMX-30D		France		55	
Leclerc ARV		France		N/A	
M578		United States		90	
Armoured engineering vehicle
M728		United States		15	
Demining vehicles
Aardvark JSFU		United Kingdom	?	?	
DOK-ING		Croatia	MV-4; MV-10	?	
Trucks
M548		United States	?	?	
M35		United States	?	?	
M939		United States	?	?	
FMTV		United States	?	100	
HEMTT		United States	?	?	
Oshkosh HET		United States	M1070A0; M1070	50	Saudi Arabia was the first export customer for the M1070 with deliveries made during 1993.
Tatra 810		Czech Republic; Saudi Arabia	810	?	Manufactured by Military Industries Corporation.
Tatra 815		Czech Republic; Saudi Arabia	815	?	Manufactured by Military Industries Corporation.
Tatra 158 Phoenix		Czech Republic; Saudi Arabia	158 Phoenix	?	Manufactured by Military Industries Corporation.
Tatra 815-7		Czech Republic; Saudi Arabia	815-7	?	Manufactured by Military Industries Corporation.

== Aviation ==
Model	Image	Origin	Variant	Quantity	Details
Helicopters
Boeing AH-64 Apache		United States	AH-64D AH-64E	47	Delivered and on order
Bell OH-58 Kiowa		United States	OH-58D	15	
Sikorsky UH-60 Black Hawk		United States	UH-60L UH-60M	100	Delivered and on order
Boeing CH-47 Chinook		United States	CH-47F	48	Delivered and on order
Unmanned aerial vehicles
Saqr		Saudi Arabia	Saqr1; Saqr2; Saqr3; Saqr4	+230	
CAIG Wing Loong		China; Saudi Arabia	Pterodactyl; Wing Loong II	300	King Abdulaziz City for Science and Technology signed a partnership with China Aerospace Science and Technology Corporation to establish a manufacturing plant in Saudi Arabia for the CH series of unmanned combat aerial vehicles.
Denel Dynamics Seeker		South Africa; Saudi Arabia	Seeker 400	?	
EMT Luna X-2000		Germany; Saudi Arabia	?	?	
Selex ES Falco		Italy	?	?	On 13 July 2012 ainonline.com reported a new sale for the Falco, bringing the number of export customers to four, and that more than 50 air vehicles were operational at the time.
Aeryon Scout		Canada	?	10	
Samoom		Saudi Arabia	Samoom	?	Intra Defense technologies, a Saudi Arabian company specialised in UAVs, optronics and electronic warfare, unveiled at the World Defense Show a brand new MALE.
MQ-9B Seaguardian		United States	MQ-9B	?	Image of the MQ-9B seaguardian, created by General Atomics This has been widely speculated to be involved in the Trump-Saudi arms deal in May 2025 yet not officially announced by either side.
