= Saudi Arabian Armed Forces =

Combined military forces of Saudi Arabia

- القوات المسلحة السعودية
- Emblem of the Armed Forces

- Flag of the Armed Forces
- Founded: 1929; 97 years ago
- Service branches: Saudi Arabian Army; Royal Saudi Navy; Royal Saudi Air Force; Royal Saudi Air Defense Forces; Royal Saudi Strategic Missile Force
- Headquarters: Riyadh

Leadership
- Supreme Commander-in-Chief: King Salman bin Abdulaziz Al Saud
- Minister of Defense: Khalid bin Salman
- Chairman of the General Staff: Air Chief Marshal Fayyadh Al Ruwaili

Personnel
- Military age: 17
- Conscription: No
- Active personnel: 279,000 (2025)

Expenditure
- Budget: $73 billion (2025) (ranked 5th)

Industry
- Domestic suppliers: KACST; SAMIC; SAMI; PSATRI; SAEC
- Foreign suppliers: Brazil; Canada; China; Czech Republic; European Union; France; Germany; Indonesia; Italy; Japan; South Korea; Netherlands; Pakistan; Poland; Russia; Singapore; South Africa; Sweden; Switzerland; Taiwan; Turkey; Ukraine; United Kingdom; United States

Related articles
- History: List of Wars; Top leaders
- Ranks: KSA military ranks

The Saudi Arabian Armed Forces (SAAF) (Arabic: القُوَّات المُسَلَّحَة العَرَبِيَّة السُّعُودِيَّة, romanized: Al-Quwwat al-Musallahah al-Arabīyah as-Su’ūdiyah), also known as the Royal Saudi Armed Forces (Arabic: القُوَّات المُسَلَّحَة المَلكِيَّة السُّعُودِيَّة, romanized: Al-Quwwat al-Musallahah al-Malakiyah as-Su’ūdiyah), is part of the military forces of the Kingdom of Saudi Arabia. It consists of the Saudi Arabian Land Forces, the Royal Saudi Naval Forces, the Royal Saudi Air Force, the Royal Saudi Air Defense, and the Royal Saudi Strategic Missile Force. The King of Saudi Arabia is the Supreme Commander-in-Chief of all the military forces and forms military policy with the Ministry of Defense and the Ministry of Interior. The five Armed Forces are among eight military forces of Saudi Arabia, with the others including the Saudi Arabian National Guard (under the administrative control of the Ministry of National Guard), the Royal Saudi Guard Regiment and the Saudi Arabian Border Guards.

The Royal Saudi Armed Forces are one of the best-funded in the world, having the world's sixth largest defense budget.

== History ==
The first steps towards building an institutionalised armed force for Saudi Arabia began in the 1940s, when Saudi regulars numbered perhaps 1,000–1,500, Gaub saying that officers mostly came from the Ottoman troops who had served the Sharif of Mecca before he was expelled in 1924. A Ministry of Defense was created in 1943; a military school founded in Taif, and the United Kingdom began efforts to try to build a professional force. After the failure of this UK programme, a subsequent U.S. programme which ran from 1951 also failed to reach its objective (the creation for three to five Regimental Combat Teams). Growth of the armed forces was slowed to some 7,500–10,000 by 1953. Continued enlargement came to a halt in the late 1950s due to internal Saudi power struggles (including two plots by senior officers) and geo-political concerns, namely the Free Officers Revolution in Egypt followed by a brutal Baathist coup in Iraq, wherein expanded post-colonial Arab armies overthrew the domestic monarchies they had sworn allegiance to in 1952 and 1958, respectively. These events led the Saudis to the conclusion that the military could pose a greater threat than their neighbors. In the decades that followed, though the Kingdom experienced economic expansion and modernization; the Royal Armed Forces remained small. From the late 1950s to the late 1970s, the Saudis expanded and modernized their military but at a slow pace. In 1969, South Yemeni forces attacked the Kingdom along the border but were swiftly defeated by Royal and allied forces. When the Yom-Kippur War broke out in 1973, Saudi Arabia used "Oil as a weapon", to aid the Arab cause; this strategy significantly influenced world opinion against Israel though to what extent is remains unclear. Following these successes, the Saudis would pursue only limited increased support for their armed forces in the wake of the Grand Mosque Seizure in 1979. In the 1980s Saudi Arabia became a major source of financial but not military assistance, for the Mujahideen in Afghanistan, and the regime of Saddam Hussein in its war against Revolutionary Iran. The 1991 Gulf War saw the greatest threat to the Kingdom in modern history and the largest deployment of Saudi Armed Forces in history, with all levels of the Saudi military actively participating as part of the U.N. coalition against Iraq.

In 1987, members of the air force, army, and navy used to be mainly recruits from groups of people without a strong identity from the Nejd tribal system and people from urban areas.

King Abdullah increasingly moved towards comprehensive military reform following what he considered a failed response by Saudi forces to Houthi incursions in 2009.

In the early 2010s, after almost 20 years of relatively modest increases in military spending, the Saudi government embarked an unprecedented expansion of the Kingdom's armed forces. This shift in policy was spear-headed primarily by Crown Prince Mohammed bin Salman, who took over as Defense Minister in 2015. It is believed the continued high level expansion of the Saudi Armed Forces was a response to not only short term threats (including incursions by Yemeni rebels and the rise of ISIS) but long term regional strategic concerns, namely the increasing strength of Iran and the uncertain future of America's role in the region.

In 2019, the government of Saudi Arabia stated that women can start working in the military. In the past they could only work in police.

== Military services ==
The armed forces are mainly the responsibility of the Ministry of Defense and Aviation, which also oversees the construction of civilian airports as well as military bases, and meteorology departments.

Crown Prince Sultan bin Abdulaziz was Saudi Arabia's Minister of Defense and Aviation from 1962 to 2011. The vice minister, Abdulrahman bin Abdulaziz, was his full brother and served until November 2011. His oldest son, Khalid bin Sultan, was appointed assistant minister in 2001 and was in office until April 2013.

== Defense spending ==
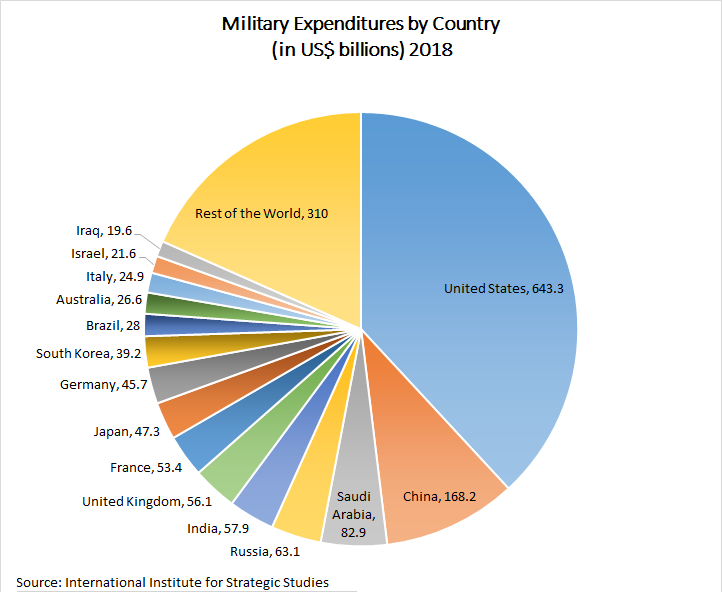
A pie chart showing global military expenditures by country for 2018, in US$ billions, according to the International Institute for Strategic Studies.

Spending on defense and security has increased significantly since the mid-1990s and was about US$67 billion in 2013. Saudi Arabia ranks among the top five nations in the world in government spending for its military, representing about 9% of GDP in 2013. Its modern, high-technology arsenal makes Saudi Arabia among the world's most densely armed nations, with its military equipment being supplied primarily by the United States, France, and Britain. According to SIPRI, in 2010–14 Saudi Arabia became the world's second largest arms importer, receiving four times more major arms than in 2005–2009. Major imports in 2010–14 included 45 combat aircraft from the United Kingdom, 38 combat helicopters from the U.S., 4 tanker aircraft from Spain and over 600 armored vehicles from Canada. Saudi Arabia has a long list of outstanding orders for arms, including 27 more combat aircraft from the United Kingdom, 154 combat aircraft from the U.S. and a large number of armoured vehicles from Canada.

The United States sold more than $80 billion in military hardware between 1951 and 2006 to the Saudi military. In comparison, the Israel Defense Forces received $53.6 billion in U.S. military grants between 1949 and 2007. On 20 October 2010, U.S. State Department notified Congress of its intention to make the biggest arms sale in American history—an estimated $60.5 billion purchase by the Kingdom of Saudi Arabia. The package represented a considerable improvement in the offensive capability of the Saudi armed forces. The United States emphasized that the arms transfer would increase "interoperability" with U.S. forces. In the Persian Gulf War, having U.S.-trained Saudi Arabian forces, along with military installations built to U.S. specifications, allowed the U.S. military to deploy in a comfortable and familiar battle environment. This new deal would increase these capabilities, as an advanced American military infrastructure is about to be built. The U.S. government was also in talks with Saudi Arabia about the potential sale of advanced naval and missile-defense upgrades.

The United Kingdom has also been a major supplier of military equipment to Saudi Arabia since 1965.

In 2014, Canada won a contract worth at least US$10 billion to supply the Saudi Arabian army with armored military vehicles.

== Service branches ==
=== Army ===
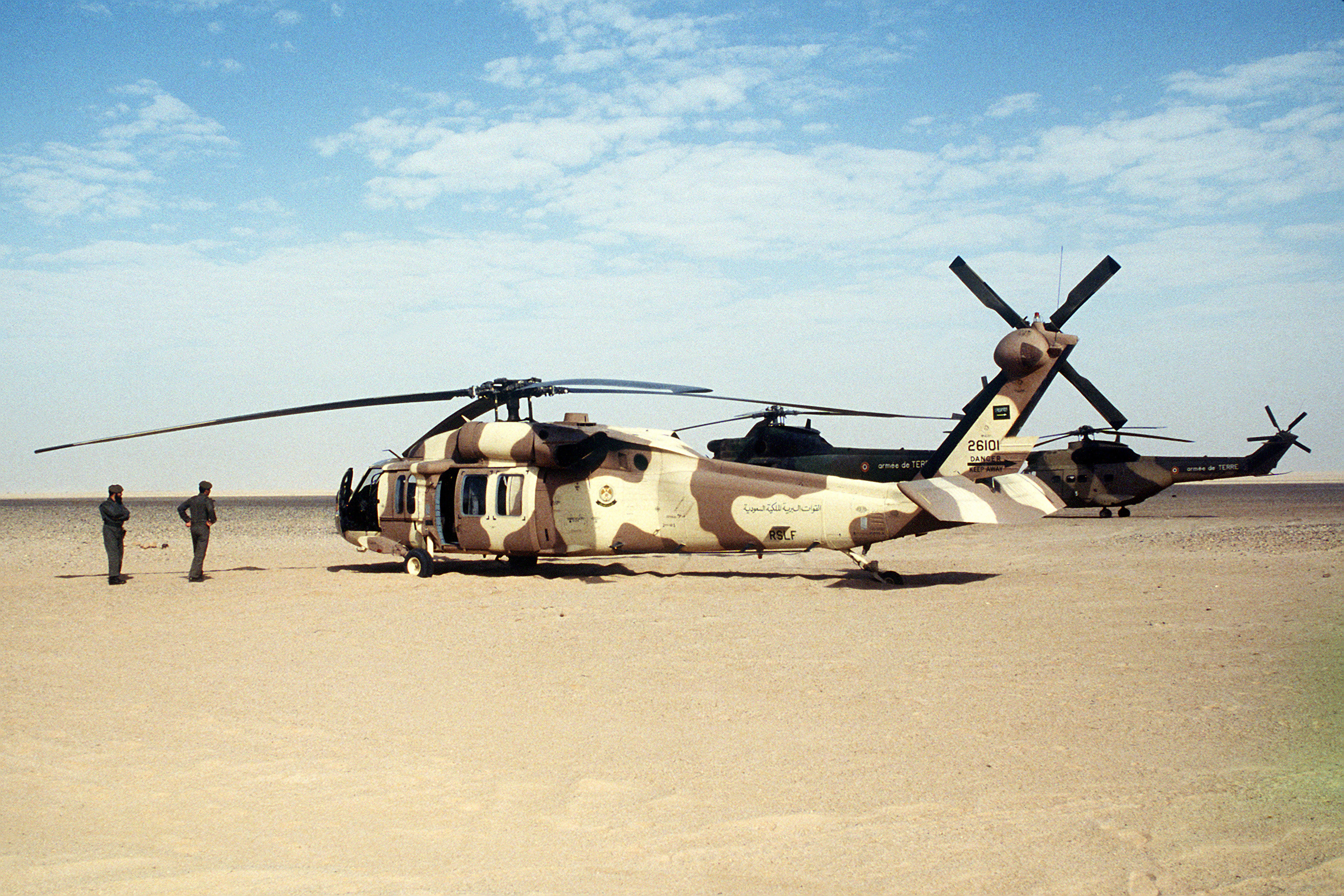
Saudi Arabian army UH-60 Blackhawk helicopter during Operation Desert Shield

The Royal Saudi Land Forces are composed of three armored brigades, five mechanized brigades, one airborne brigade, one Royal Guard brigade, and eight artillery battalions. The army also has one aviation command with two aviation brigades.

The army's main equipment consists of a combination of French- and U.S.-made armored vehicles: 315 M1A2 Abrams, 290 AMX–30, and 450 M60A3 main battle tanks; 300 reconnaissance vehicles; 570+ AMX–10P and 400 M2 Bradley armored infantry fighting vehicles; 3,000+ M113 and 100 Al-Fahd armored personnel carriers, produced in Saudi Arabia; 200+ towed artillery pieces; 110 self-propelled artillery pieces; 60 multiple rocket launchers; 400 mortars; 10 surface-to-surface missiles; about 2,000 antitank guided weapons; about 200 rocket launchers; 450 recoilless launchers; 12 attack helicopters; 50+ transport helicopters; and 1,000 surface-to-air missiles.

In 1996 Saudi Arabia had military cities in the northeast, the King Khalid Military City, at Tabuk, at Dharhran, and at Abha in the southwest. There was a 1996 report that construction of a military city at Jizan, orientated toward Yemen, had begun with Defense Minister Prince Sultan pouring the first concrete on 8 May 1996.

The Library of Congress Country Study for Saudi Arabia, issued in 1992, noted that "[t]he army has been chronically under strength, in the case of some units by an estimated 30 to 50 percent. These shortages have been aggravated by a relaxed policy that permitted considerable absenteeism and by a serious problem of retaining experienced technicians and non-commissioned officers.

=== Navy ===
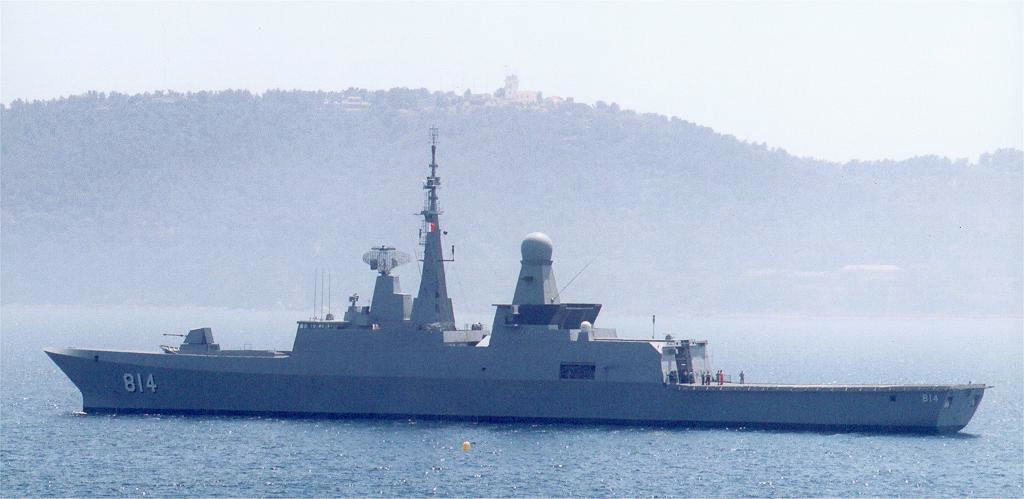
Makkah, an Al Riyadh-class frigate

The navy is divided into two fleets: the Western Fleet has bases in Jeddah, Jizan, and Al Wajh; the Eastern Fleet has bases in Al Jubayl, Ad Dammam, Ras Mishab, and Ras al Ghar. The marines are organized into one infantry regiment with two battalions.

The navy's inventory includes 11 principal surface combatants, 65 patrol and coastal combatants, 7 mine warfare vessels, 8 amphibious craft, and 7 support and miscellaneous craft. Naval aviation forces have 19 helicopters (armed) serving in naval support.

=== Air Force ===
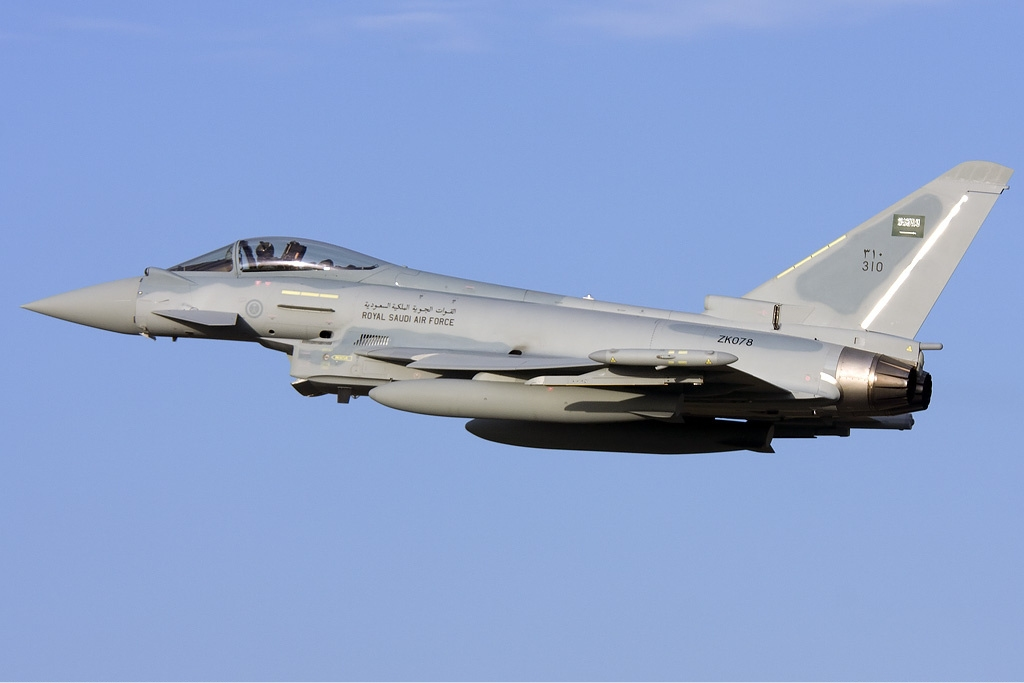
Eurofighter Typhoon

The air force is organized in seven fighter/ground-attack squadrons, six fighter squadrons, and seven training squadrons. Saudi Arabia has at least 15 active military airfields.

As of 2011, Saudi Arabia has around 300 combat aircraft. The kingdom's combat aircraft are newly acquired Typhoons and upgraded Tornado IDS, F-15 Eagle and F-15E Strike Eagle fighter planes. Saudi Arabia has a further 80+ F-15 Eagles on order and an option to buy another 72 Typhoons.

=== Air Defense ===
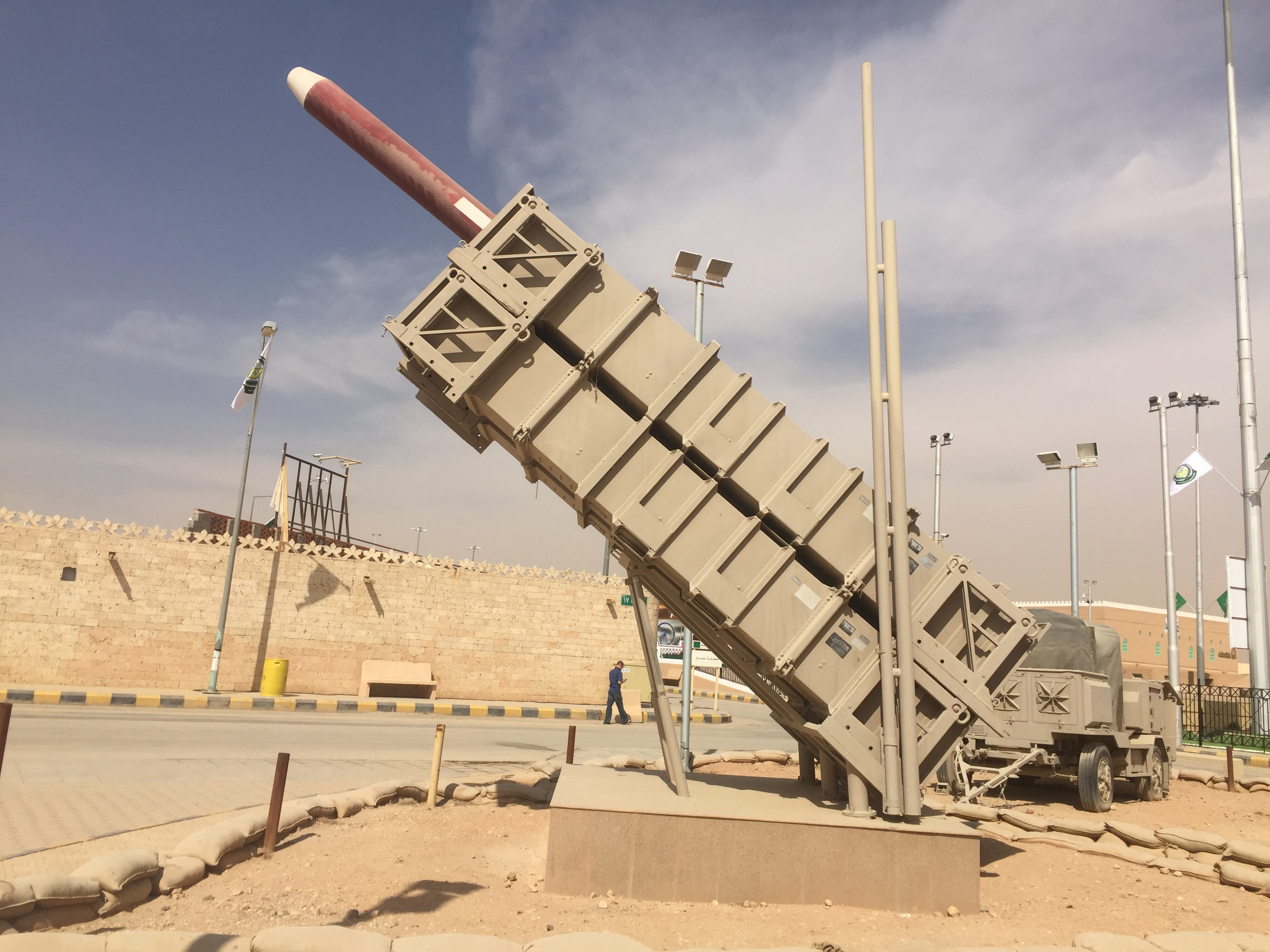
Saudi MIM-104 Patriot on display

Air Defense was part of the Army until 1981 when it was made a separate service. It operates "Peace Shield" a state-of-the-art radar and air defense system consisting of a Command Operations Center at Riyadh, and main operating bases at Dhahran, Taif, Tabuk, Khamis Mushait and Al Kharj. The total system includes 164 sites.

The system equipment comprises 17 General Electric AN/FPS-117 long-range 3D radars, 6 Northrop Grumman AN/TPS-43 tactical radars, and Raytheon Improved HAWK air defense missile system.

=== Strategic Missile Force ===
The Royal Saudi Strategic Missile Forces (RSSMF) is equipped with the Chinese DF-3A (CSS-2) Dongfeng missile sold to Saudi Arabia by China. A conventional high-explosive warhead (2150 kg) variant of the DongFeng 3A Intermediate-Range Ballistic Missile was developed for an export order to Saudi Arabia in 1987. About 30+ missiles and 9~12 launchers were reportedly delivered in 1988, though no known test launch has ever been made in the country. IISS Military Balance 2022 estimates that the SMF has 2,500 personnel. Probably it is separate branch officially called Strategic Missile Forces (guessing by its website URL http://www.smf.gov.sa/).

It certainly has one advanced Al-Watah ballistic missile base (found on the satellite images) in the rocky central part of Saudi Arabia, some 200 km south-west of the capital city Riyadh. Two other bases include Al Sulayyil ballistic missile base (the older base located 450 km southwest of Riyadh) and Al Jufayr base (placed 90 km south of Riyadh) share many similarities, suggesting that they share the same role.

== Armed Forces Medical Service ==
Armed Forces Medical Service of Saudi Arabia provides medical services to all members of the Armed Forces. It is led by a Director General and is responsible for 24 military hospitals across Saudi Arabia.

The service operates aero lift operations with its own fleet of aircraft:

- Lockheed Martin VC-130H flying hospital
- Bell 212 helicopter
- Aerospatile Dolphin 365N helicopter
- Sikorsky UH-60 Desert Hawk helicopter
- Learjet
- Gulfstream G3
- Gulfstream G4
- Gulfstream G5

== Major military operations ==
=== Grand Mosque seizure ===
In 1979, Islamic extremists took control of the Grand Mosque in Mecca. The extremists were led by Juhayman Al Otaiba and held many worshippers hostage for weeks.

With the help of Pakistani and Western troops, the Saudi military captured the terrorists inside the Grand Mosque.

=== Gulf War ===
Desert Storm, the 1991 liberation of Kuwait and military invasion of Iraq, was launched from Saudi Arabian territory and Saudi Arabian forces participated in the operation

When Iraq invaded Saudi Arabia's northern neighbor Kuwait in 1990, Saudi Arabia immediately requested the deployment of U.S. troops within the country to deter further aggression. Saudi forces participated in the subsequent Operation Desert Storm: Saudi pilots flew more than 7,000 sorties and Saudi troops took part in the battles around the Saudi town of Ras al-Khafji.

=== Operation Southern Watch ===
Since the Gulf War, the United States stationed 5,000 troops in Saudi Arabia, a figure that rose to 10,000 during the 2003 conflict in Iraq. Operation Southern Watch enforced the no-fly zones over southern Iraq set up after 1991, as well, the country's oil exports through the shipping lanes of the Persian Gulf are protected by the United States Fifth Fleet based in Bahrain. It was conducted by Joint Task Force Southwest Asia (JTF-SWA) with the mission of monitoring and controlling airspace south of the 32nd Parallel (extended to the 33rd Parallel in 1996) in Iraq, following the 1991 Persian Gulf War until the 2003 invasion of Iraq.

This was one of the stated motivations behind the September 11 attacks, as well as the Khobar Towers bombing. Bin Laden interpreted the Islamic prophet, Muhammad as banning the "permanent presence of infidels in Arabia".

=== Houthi insurgency in Yemen ===
On 5 November 2009, the Royal Saudi Land Forces launched a sweeping ground offensive against Yemen's Shiite Houthi rebels after they crossed the Saudi border to outflank the Yemeni Army, which had launched a military campaign against the Houthis to control and pacify the northern Yemeni mountains, and killed two Saudi border guards. The Saudi forces relied heavily on air power and artillery to soften the rebels without risking their men. The Saudi Army lost 133 soldiers in the fighting against the rebels, with most of the casualties occurring when ground forces tried to move into areas that had been softened by shelling that "raised alarms across the Sunni Arab world about the possibility that Iran might be supporting the Yemeni rebels". It has been reported that Saudi Arabia made extensive use of paid mercenaries from Latin America and Africa during the Saudi-led intervention in the Yemeni civil war.

== Military industry ==
The vast majority of Saudi Arabia's military equipment is imported from the Western world. The United States sold more than $80 billion in military hardware between 1951 and 2006 to the Saudi military. 2013 saw Saudi military spending climb to $67bn, overtaking that of the UK, France and Japan to place fourth globally. The United Kingdom has also been a major supplier of military equipment to Saudi Arabia since 1965. Since 1985, the UK has supplied military aircraft—notably the Tornado and Eurofighter Typhoon combat aircraft—and other equipment as part of the long-term Al-Yamamah arms deal estimated to have been worth £43 billion by 2006 and thought to be worth a further £40 billion. In 2012, British defence giant BAE signed a £1.9bn ($3bn) deal to supply Hawk trainer jets to Saudi Arabia.

According to the Stockholm International Peace Research Institute, in 2010–14 Saudi Arabia became the world's second-largest arms importer, receiving four times more major arms than in 2005–2009. Major imports in 2010–14 included 45 combat aircraft from the UK, 38 combat helicopters from the U.S., four tanker aircraft from Spain, and over 600 armoured vehicles from Canada. Saudi Arabia received 41% of UK arms exports in 2010–14. France authorized $18 billion in weapons sales to Saudi Arabia in 2015 alone. The $15 billion arms deal with Saudi Arabia is believed to be the largest arms sale in Canadian history. In 2016, the European Parliament decided to temporarily impose an arms embargo against Saudi Arabia, as a result of the Yemen civilian population's suffering from the conflict with Saudi Arabia. In 2017, Saudi Arabia signed a 110 billion dollar arms deal with the United States. Saudi Arabia is Britain's largest arms customer, with more than £4.6 billion worth of arms bought since the start of Saudi-led coalition in Yemen. According to a report from the Global Affairs Canada, a record-breaking amount of military hardware was sold to Saudi Arabia in 2019, despite its poor human rights record.

Following the assassination of Jamal Khashoggi, a nonbinding resolution was passed in the European Parliament on 25 October 2018, urging EU countries to impose an EU-wide arms embargo on Saudi Arabia. Germany became the first Western government to suspend future arms deal with the kingdom after Angela Merkel stated that "arms exports can't take place in the current circumstances."

The Al-Fahd Infantry fighting vehicle and the Al-Faris 8–400 armored personnel carrier, used by Saudi land forces, were manufactured by the Abdallah Al Faris Company for Heavy Industries, based in Dammam. Also, Al-Kaser and Al-Mansour armored vehicles and the Al-Masmak MRAP, all are Saudi-made Ashibl 1 and Ashibl 2 are Saudi-made armored vehicles used by the Royal Saudi Land Forces and Battalion 85. Saudi Arabia has also recently unveiled the new Tuwaiq MRAP. Saudi Arabian Military Industries signed a Memorandum of Understanding with ROSOBORONEXPORT for the local production of the 9M133 Kornet-EM anti-tank guided missile (ATGM) system, the TOS-1A advanced multiple rocket launcher and AGS-30 automatic grenade launchers with grenades and Kalashnikov AK-103.

== Flags of the Armed Forces ==
Flag of the Saudi Arabian Armed Forces

Flag of the Royal Saudi Land Forces

Flag of the Royal Saudi Air Force

Naval base flag of the Royal Saudi Naval Forces

Flag of the Royal Saudi Air Defense Forces

Flag of the Royal Strategic Missile Force

== See also ==
- Saudi Arabian Military Forces
- Saudi Arabian National Guard
- Saudi Royal Guard Regiment
- Nuclear program of Saudi Arabia
- King Khalid Military City
