= Commander of Royal Air Force (Saudi Arabia) =

Commander of the Royal Air Force
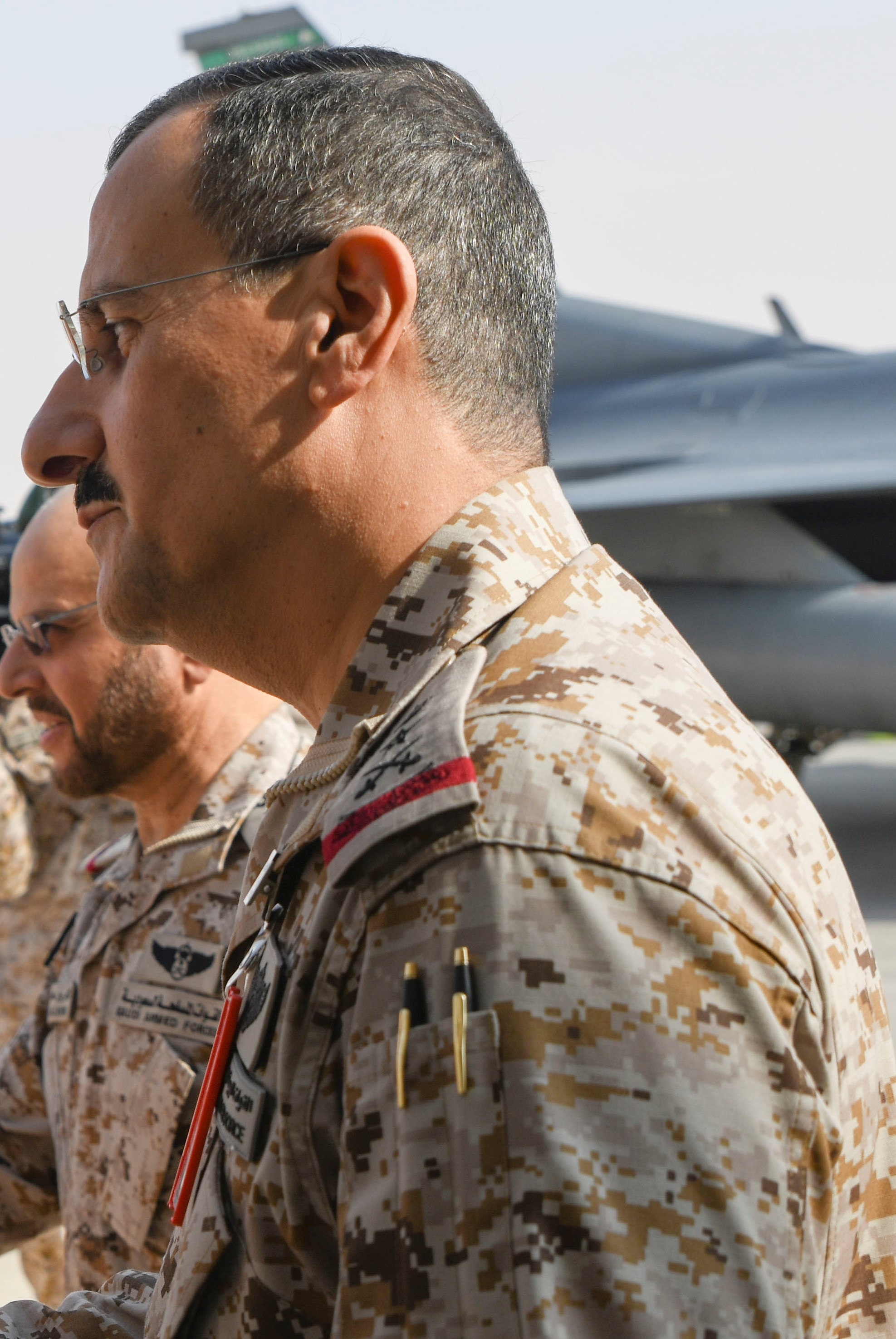
- Incumbent; Lt. General Turki bin Bandar since 26 February 2018
- R.S. Air Forces
- Style: His Excellency
- Member of: General Staff Presidency; Higher Officers Committee
- Reports to: Chairman of General Staff
- Term length: No fixed length
- Website: Official website

The Commander of Royal Air Force, is the top most authority in the Royal Saudi Air Force.

== Commanders ==
- Air Force Director
1. Captain Abdullah Al Mandili
2. Major Rashid Al Saleh
3. Major General Ibrahim Al Tassan (1950–1959)
- Commander of the Air Force
1. Lieutenant General Asaad Abdelaziz al-Zuhair acting (1959–1966)
2. Major General Hashim bin Said Hashim (1966–1972)

Commander of the Saudi Royal Air Force

No.	Portrait	Commander	Took office	Left office	Time in office	Ref.
1	Asaad Abdelaziz al-Zuhair [ar]	Lieutenant General; Asaad Abdelaziz al-Zuhair (1929–?)	1972	1 January 1980	7–8 years	
2	Mohammed Sabri Suleiman	Lieutenant General; Mohammed Sabri Suleiman	1 January 1980	1984	3–4 years	
3	Abdullah bin AbdulAziz al-Hamdan	Lieutenant General; Abdullah bin AbdulAziz al-Hamdan	1984	1987	2–3 years	
4	Ahmed Ibrahim Behery	Lieutenant General; Ahmed Ibrahim Behery	1987	March 1996	8–9 years	
5	Abdul Aziz bin Mohammad al-Henadi	Lieutenant General; Abdul Aziz bin Mohammad al-Henadi	March 1996	4 April 2004	8 years	
6	Prince Abdulrahman al-Faisal	Lieutenant General; Prince Abdulrahman al-Faisal	4 April 2004	16 June 2010	6 years	
7	Mohammed Al-Ayesh	Lieutenant General; Mohammed Al-Ayesh	16 June 2010	10 May 2013	2 years	
8	Fayyadh Al Ruwaili	Lieutenant General; Fayyadh Al Ruwaili (born 1958)	10 May 2013	14 May 2014	1 years	
9	Muhammad Al Shaalan	Lieutenant General; Muhammad Al Shaalan (?–2015)	14 May 2014	10 June 2015 †	1 years	
10	Mohammed al-Otaibi	Major General; Mohammed al-Otaibi	10 June 2015	26 February 2018	2 years	
11	Prince Turki bin Bandar	Lieutenant General; Prince Turki bin Bandar	26 February 2018	Incumbent	8 years	

== See also ==
- Armed Forces of Saudi Arabia
