= Abdallah Al Faris Company for Heavy Industries =

Abdallah Al Faris Company for Heavy Industries is one of the main suppliers of arms to the Saudi Arabian Army. It has created the Al-Fahd and the Al-Faris 8-400.
