= Shibl 2 =

Overview
- Manufacturer: Military Industries Corporation
- Also called: Al Shibl 2

Body and chassis
- Class: Light Armored Vehicle
- Platform: Toyota Land Cruiser

Powertrain
- Transmission: 5 Speed Manual
- Propulsion: 6 Cylinder Diesel Engine

The Shibl 2 (or Al Shibl 2) is an armored derivative of the Toyota Land Cruiser (4x4). Manufactured by the Saudi Arabian Military Industries Corporation (MIC) the Shibl 2 is designed to function as a multi-role light vehicle. The Shibl 2 has two variations, both are crewed by a commander and a driver.

The first variation can carry up to five passengers or a 600 kg payload. The second variation has an extended wheelbase, two extra seats and can carry up to seven passengers or a 1000 kg payload.

This vehicle can be armed with an assortment of turret ring-mounted weapons, including .50 caliber (12.7mm) and .30 caliber (7.62mm) machine guns, as well as a Mk 19 grenade launcher (40mm). It has level 1 armor per STANAG 4569 as well as armor around the engine and fuel tank which is rated to stop 7.62×51mm NATO ball ammunition.

The Shibl 2 is used domestically by the Saudi Arabian Armed Forces and sold abroad to other nations including Yemen.
