= List of international trips made by Mohammed bin Salman as Crown Prince of Saudi Arabia =

This is the list of international visits made by Mohammed bin Salman, the Crown Prince of Saudi Arabia and Prime Minister since 2017. As the de facto ruler of Saudi Arabia, he has undertaken numerous international visits and tours, during which he met with leaders and heads of state of many countries and led Saudi Arabia's delegation at major global events.

== List of visits ==
=== 2016 ===
Country	Location	Date(s)	Purpose(s)	Ref.	Note(s)
China	Beijing	31 August	Official visit. Met with President Xi Jinping to review bilateral relations and explore ways to develop strategic cooperation. Discussed regional and international developments.		Met with Saudi students studying at Chinese universities

=== 2017 ===
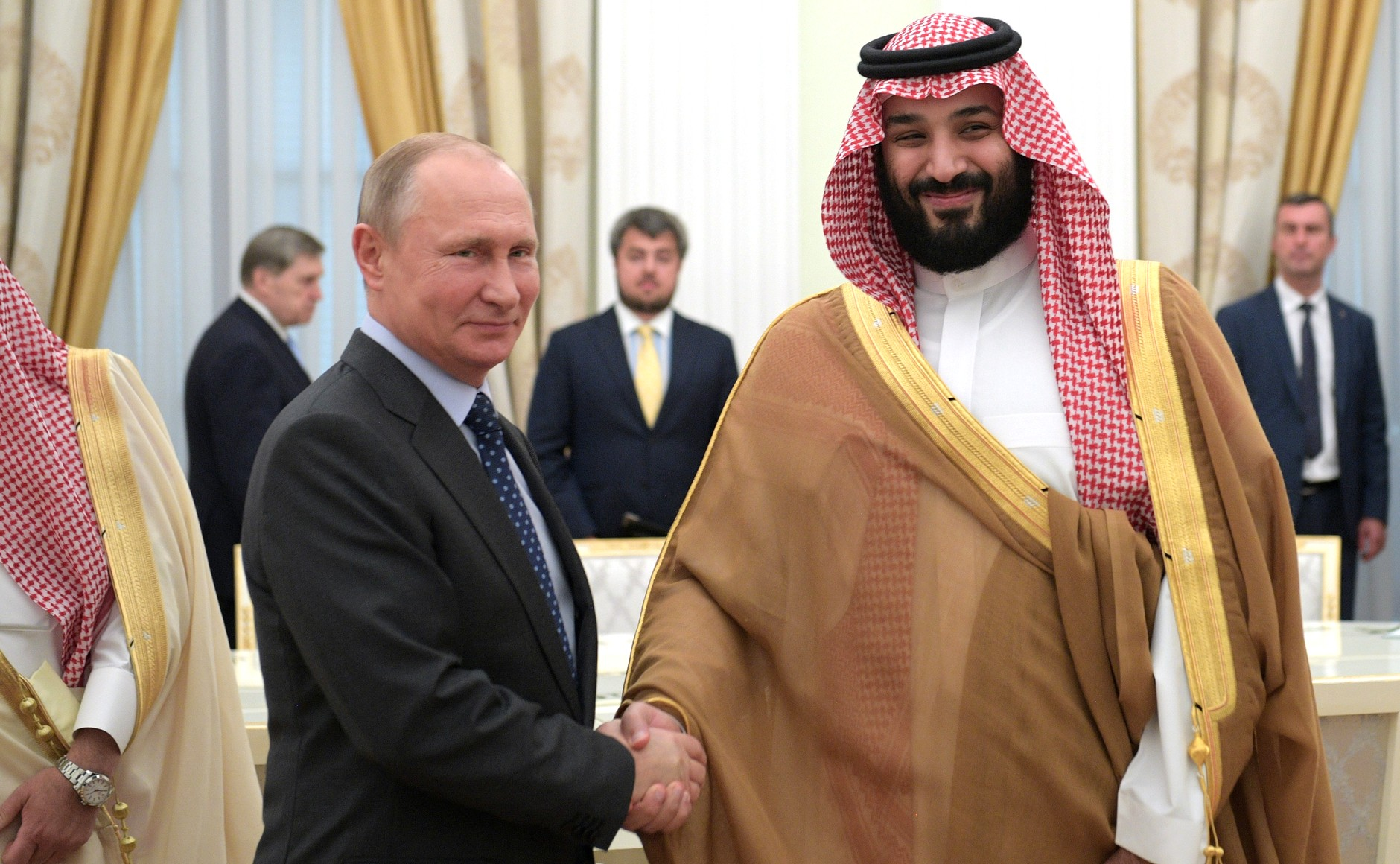
MBS with Russian president Vladimir Putin (left) in Moscow

Country	Location	Date(s)	Purpose(s)	Ref.	Note(s)
United States	Washington, D.C.	14 March	Working lunch with President Donald Trump at the White House. Discussions focused on counterterrorism and bilateral relations.		First visit to the White House; MBS was Deputy Crown Prince at the time
Russia	Moscow	30 May	Official visit. Met with President Vladimir Putin and senior officials to discuss bilateral relations. Agreement signed on various military fields.		Visit focused on energy cooperation and regional security

=== 2018 ===
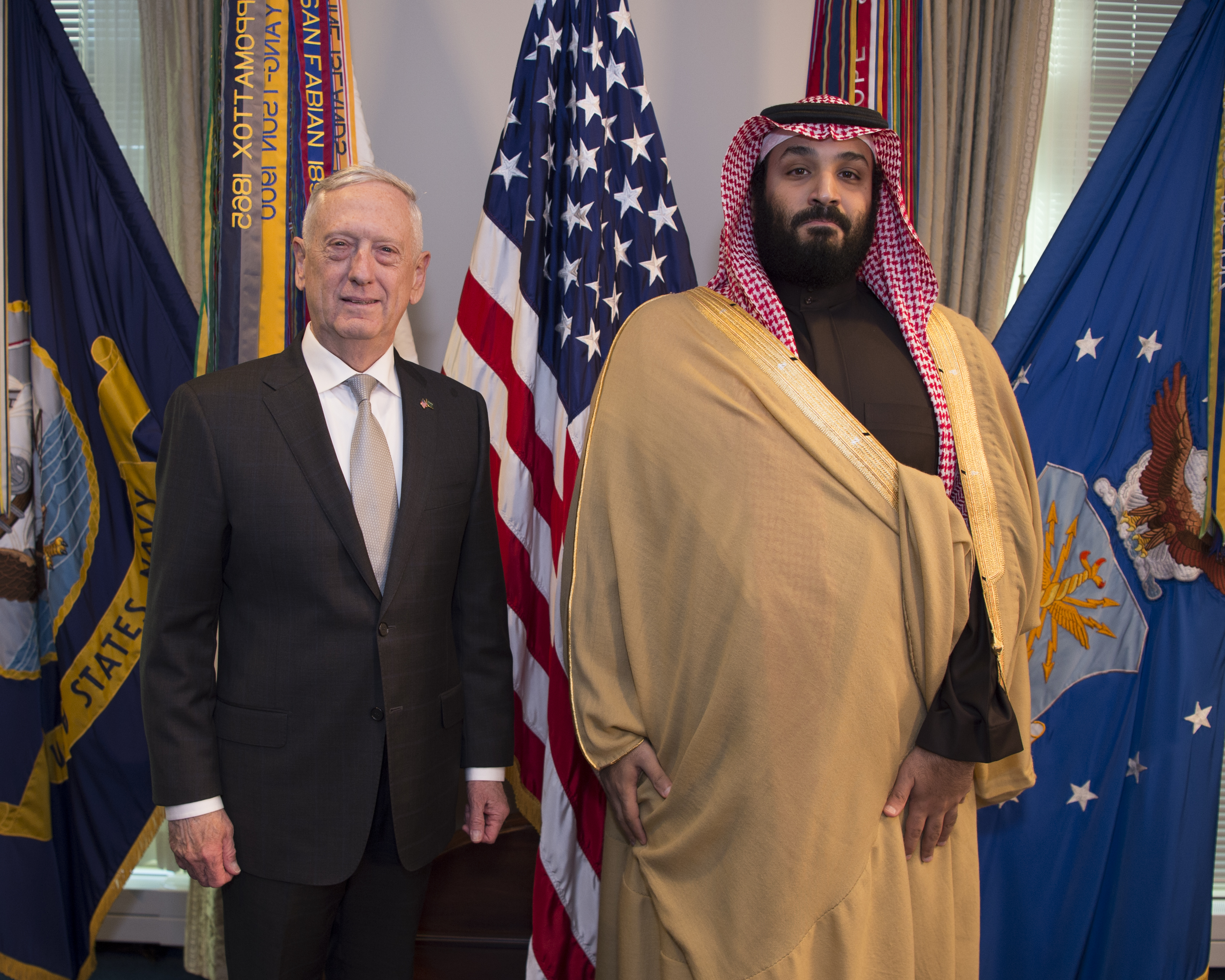
Crown Prince Mohammed bin Salman with U.S. Defense Secretary James Mattis, March 2018

Country	Location	Date(s)	Purpose(s)	Ref.	Note(s)
United States	Washington, D.C., California	20 March – 8 April	Official visit. Sponsored signing ceremony for joint venture between Saudi Arabian Military Industries (SAMI) and Boeing to localize military aircraft maintenance. Met with Saudi engineers at Lockheed Martin in Silicon Valley working on first Saudi satellite (SGS-1), which he signed with phrase "Above the clouds."		Three-week tour of the United States; aimed at localizing 50% of military spending by 2030
Argentina	Buenos Aires	28–30 November	Attended G20 Summit.		Visit occurred amid international controversy following Khashoggi killing; Argentine prosecutor opened investigation into alleged crimes against humanity

=== 2019 ===
Country	Location	Date(s)	Purpose(s)	Ref.	Note(s)
Pakistan	Islamabad	17–19 February	Official visit. Met with Prime Minister Imran Khan. Bilateral agreements worth $20 billion signed.		First leg of Asian tour including India and China
Japan	Osaka	27–29 June	Led Saudi Arabia's delegation to G20 Summit. Several bilateral agreements signed covering cultural exchange, combating counterfeiting, small and medium enterprises, energy sector, and industrial cooperation.		Saudi-Japanese relations strengthened through multiple agreements

=== 2021 ===
Country	Location	Date(s)	Purpose(s)	Ref.	Note(s)
Oman	Muscat	6 December	Official visit. Met with Sultan Haitham bin Tariq to review bilateral cooperation across political, economic, military, and security fields.		First leg of Gulf tour following AlUla Declaration
United Arab Emirates	Abu Dhabi	7–8 December	Official visit. Met with Sheikh Mohammed bin Zayed Al Nahyan, Crown Prince of Abu Dhabi, to review strategic partnership and bilateral cooperation.		Two-day visit focused on economic and security coordination
Qatar	Doha	8 December	Official visit. Met with Emir Tamim bin Hamad Al Thani to discuss fraternal relations, cooperation strategies, and regional developments.		Part of reconciliation efforts following end of Qatar diplomatic crisis
Bahrain	Manama	9–10 December	Official visit. Met with King Hamad bin Isa Al Khalifa to discuss implementation of AlUla Declaration and GCC Supreme Council vision.		Discussions emphasized implementation of Custodian of the Two Holy Mosques' vision
Kuwait	Kuwait City	10 December	Official visit. Met with Emir Nawaf Al-Ahmad Al-Jaber Al-Sabah and Crown Prince Mishal Al-Ahmad Al-Jaber Al-Sabah.		Final stop of six-day Gulf tour

=== 2022 ===
Country	Location	Date(s)	Purpose(s)	Ref.	Note(s)
Egypt	Cairo	20–21 June	Official visit at invitation of President Abdel Fattah el-Sisi. Agreed to strengthen economic partnership through investment and trade deals totaling $8 billion. Collaboration in renewable energy sector with 10-gigawatt electric power project.		First stop of regional tour
Jordan	Amman	21 June	Official visit. Met with King Abdullah II to discuss bilateral relations, joint cooperation opportunities, and regional and international developments.		
Turkey	Ankara	22 June	Official visit at invitation of President Recep Tayyip Erdoğan. Held official talks on enhancing cooperation in political, economic, military, security, and cultural fields.		First visit to Turkey since Khashoggi killing; marked warming of relations
Greece	Athens	26 July	Official visit. Met with Prime Minister Kyriakos Mitsotakis to explore bilateral relationship development. Agreement reached to establish Saudi-Greek Strategic Partnership Council.		
Egypt	Sharm El-Sheikh	7 November	Attended second edition of Middle East Green Initiative Summit during COP27, co-presided with President Abdel Fattah el-Sisi.		Summit focused on climate change and environmental initiatives
Indonesia	Bali	15 November	Led Saudi Arabia's delegation at G20 Leaders Summit. Enhanced cooperation with Indonesia toward strategic partnership.		Visit strengthened Saudi-Indonesian relations across multiple sectors
South Korea	Seoul	16 November	Official visit. Met with Prime Minister Han Duck-soo to discuss bilateral relations and cooperation opportunities.		
Thailand	Bangkok	17 November	Official visit. Led Saudi Arabia's delegation at Asia-Pacific Economic Cooperation Forum summit. Met with Prime Minister Prayut Chan-o-cha. Several memoranda of understanding signed in investment, energy, and tourism. Saudi-Thai Coordination Council established.		Visit marked significant improvement in Saudi-Thai relations

=== 2023 ===
Country	Location	Date(s)	Purpose(s)	Ref.	Note(s)
France	Paris	16 June	Official visit. Met with President Emmanuel Macron at Élysée Palace to examine historical and strategic relations. Led Saudi Arabia's delegation at Summit for a New Global Financing Pact (22-23 June) addressing inequality, climate change, and poverty.		First visit to France as Crown Prince; focused on economic and cultural cooperation
India	New Delhi	9–11 September	Led Saudi Arabia's delegation to G20 Leaders Summit. Met with President Droupadi Murmu. Co-chaired inaugural meeting of Saudi-Indian Strategic Partnership Council with Prime Minister Narendra Modi.		Strategic Partnership Council elevated bilateral relations to new level
Qatar	Doha	5 December	Official visit. Met with Emir Tamim bin Hamad Al Thani. Led Saudi Arabia's delegation at forty-fourth session of GCC Supreme Council and seventh session of Saudi-Qatari Coordination Council.		Co-chaired Saudi-Qatari Coordination Council with Qatari Emir

=== 2024 ===
Country	Location	Date(s)	Purpose(s)	Ref.	Note(s)
Bahrain	Manama	16 May	Led Saudi Arabia's delegation at thirty-third session of the Council of the Arab League at the summit level.		Summit focused on Palestinian issue and regional security
Egypt	Cairo	15 October	Official visit. Met with President Abdel Fattah el-Sisi. Oversaw signing of agreement to establish Saudi-Egyptian Supreme Coordination Council, co-chaired by both leaders.		Agreement aimed at deepening bilateral strategic cooperation
Kuwait	Kuwait City	1 December	Led Saudi Arabia's delegation at forty-fifth session of GCC Supreme Council.		Summit addressed Gulf security and economic integration

=== 2025 ===
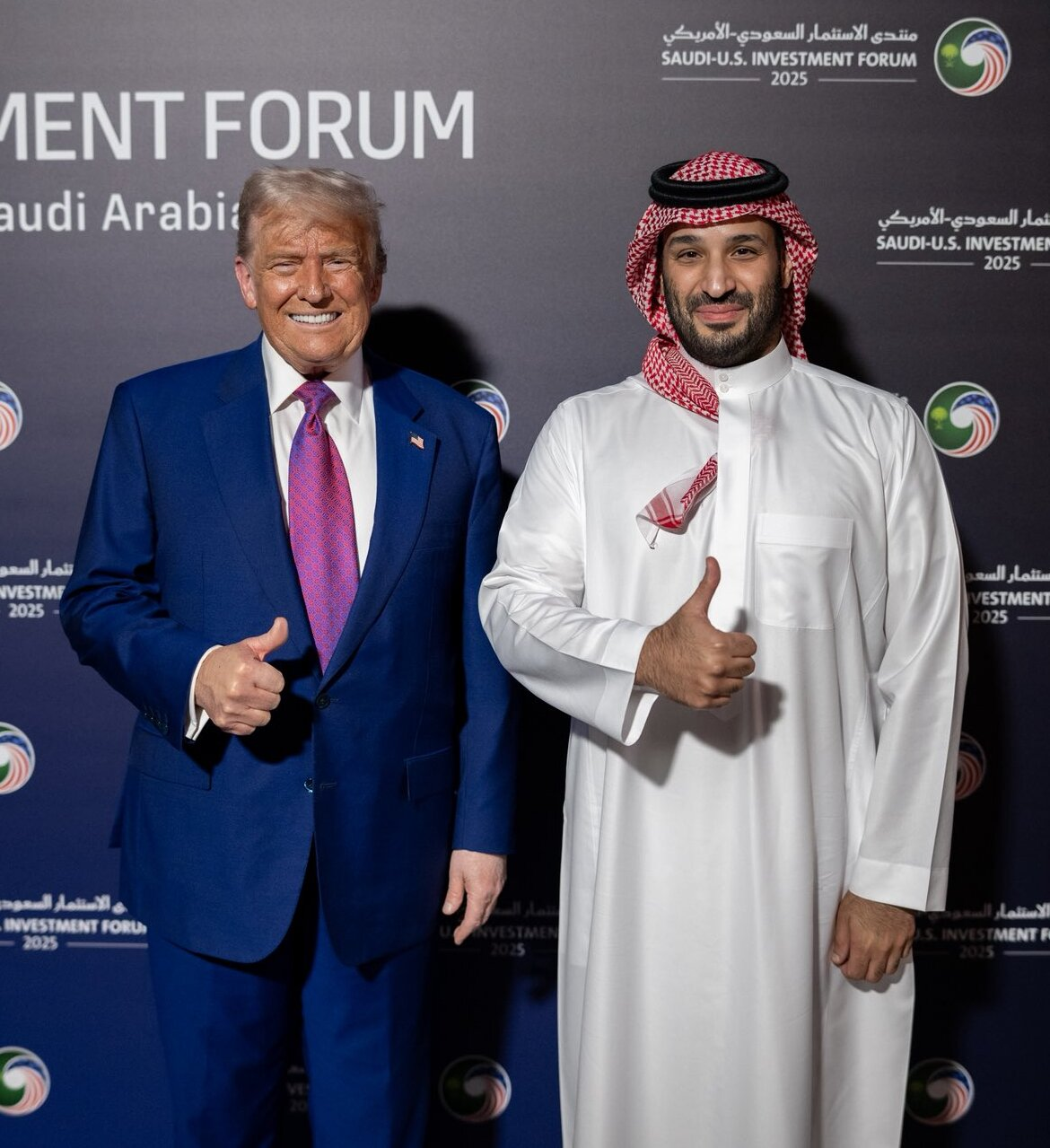
President Trump and Crown Prince Mohammed bin Salman at the White House, November 2025

Country	Location	Date(s)	Purpose(s)	Ref.	Note(s)
United States	Washington, D.C.	18–19 November	Official working visit at invitation of President Donald Trump. Received with full arrival ceremony on White House South Lawn including military flyover and honor guard. Bilateral meetings in Oval Office. Signed US-Saudi Strategic Defense Agreement and multiple economic agreements valued at approximately $270 billion. Attended US-Saudi Investment Forum at Kennedy Center. Met with Speaker of the House Mike Johnson and Congressional leaders. Saudi Arabia designated as Major non-NATO ally. State dinner hosted by President Trump and First Lady Melania Trump.		First visit to United States since March 2018; Saudi investment commitments increased to almost $1 trillion; agreements include defense pact, F-35 fighter jet sales, nuclear cooperation, and artificial intelligence collaboration

== See also ==
- Foreign relations of Saudi Arabia
- Saudi Vision 2030
- Mohammed bin Salman
