= Fayyadh Al Ruwaili =

Chairman of the Saudi General Staff

Fayyadh al-Ruwaili
- فياض الرويلي
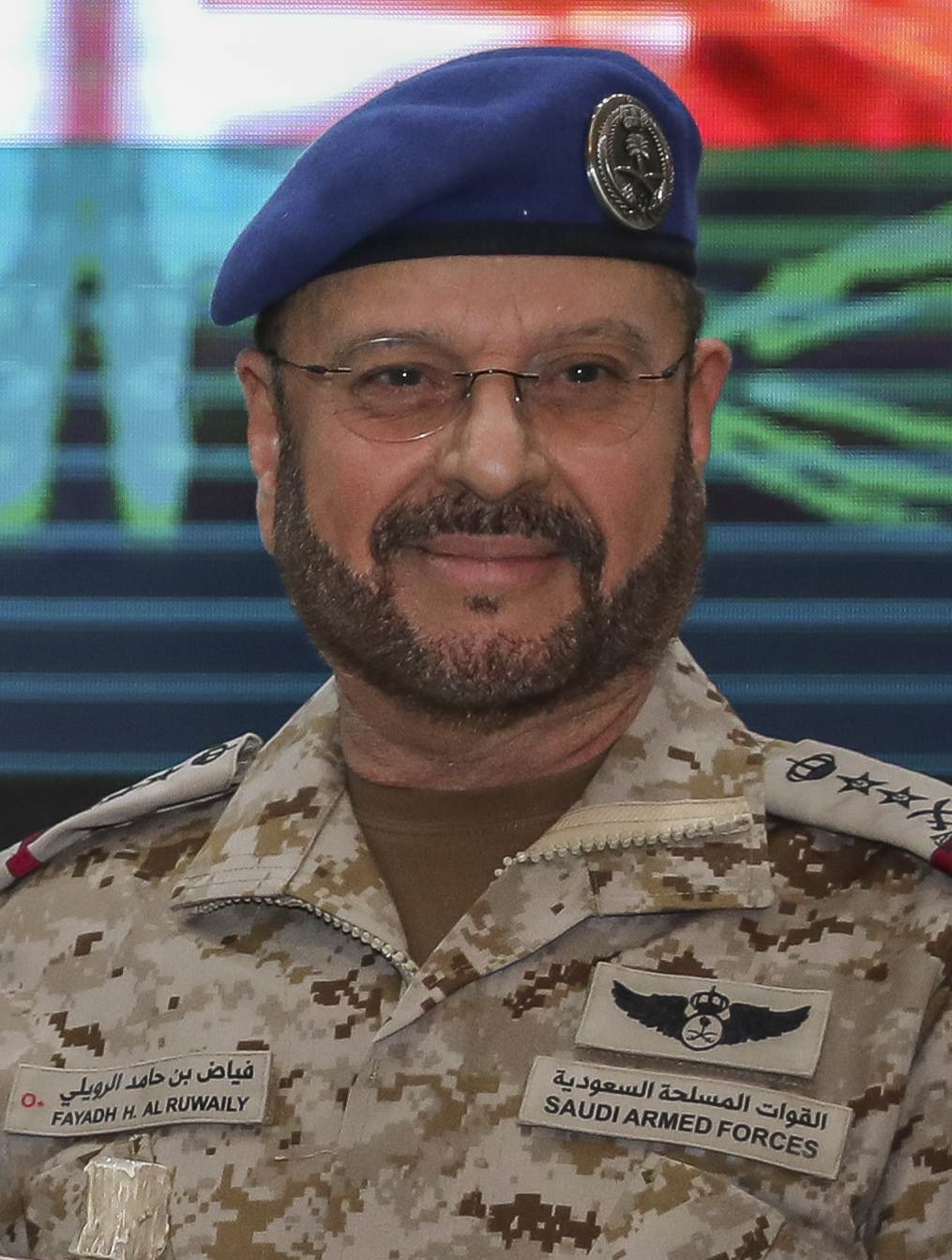
- Born: 27 April 1958 (age 68); Turaif, Northern Borders, Saudi Arabia
- Education: King Faisal Air Academy; Air Command and Staff College; Air War College
- Military career
- Allegiance: Saudi Arabia
- Branch: Royal Saudi Air Force
- Rank: General
- Commands: Chairman of the General Staff; Deputy Chairman of the General Staff; Commander of the Royal Air Force
- Conflicts: Saudi-led intervention in the Yemeni civil war

General Fayyadh bin Hamed bin Raqed Al Ruwaili (born 27 April 1958) is a Royal Saudi Air Force officer who has served as the Chairman of the General Staff of the Saudi Arabian Armed Forces since 2018. Before that, he served as Deputy Chairman of the General Staff from 2014 to 2018 and commander of the Air Force from 2013 to 2014. In 2026, he also became commander of the Joint Forces Command in Yemen, while still serving as Chairman of the General Staff.

== Biography ==
Al Ruwaili was born on 27 April 1958 to a merchant family with ties to the Red Sea trade. He was trained at the King Faisal Air Academy and in the United States at Lakeland, Florida. Al Ruwaili later obtained master's degrees in military science from the Air Command and Staff College, where he was awarded the Sword of Honor and graduated first in his class, and in strategic studies from the Air War College. He commanded the western sector of King Fahd Air Base, before serving as the commander of the Royal Saudi Air Force from 2013 to 2014.

He was appointed as Deputy Chairman of the General Staff in May 2014 during a reshuffle of the Saudi Arabian military command by King Abdullah. His selection of new commanders reflected a realignment of the kingdom's military to focus on strategic directions of defense. Al Ruwaili, being from the Red Sea coast, was seen as "overlooking" Egypt. Al Ruwaili remained in that role until February 2018, when he was appointed the Chairman of the General Staff.

In March 2022, Al Ruwaili and other Arab military chiefs met the Israel Defense Forces chief of staff, Lt. Gen. Aviv Kohavi to discuss the threat posed by Iran. In November 2024, he had visited Iran to meet his counterpart in the Islamic Republic of Iran Armed Forces, Gen. Mohammad Bagheri. In September 2026, he met IDF chief Lt. Gen. Eyal Zamir to discuss security cooperation.

Al Ruwaili was appointed as commander of Saudi-led coalition Joint Forces Command in Yemen in November 2026, in addition to his current post. The appointment occurred as the Houthis advanced within eighty kilometers of the Yemeni capital Aden.

== Personal life ==
Al Ruwaili's son Alhumaidi "KSAA" Al Ruwaili is a professional Overwatch player. KSAA played on the Vancouver Titans of the Overwatch League, and is currently signed to Saudi team Twisted Minds of the Overwatch Champions Series.

Military offices
Preceded by Mohammed Al Ayesh	Commander of the Royal Saudi Air Force; 2013–2014	Succeeded by Muhammad Al Shaalan
Preceded by Abdulrahman al-Bunyan	Chairman of the General Staff; 2018–present	Incumbent
Preceded by Fahd bin Hamad al-Salman	Commander of the Joint Forces Command in Yemen; 2026–present	Incumbent
