= Muhammad Al Shaalan =

Saudi military officer

- محمد الشعلان
- Born: Muhammad bin Ahmed Al Shaalan
- Died: June 2015
- Military career
- Allegiance: Saudi Arabia
- Branch: Royal Saudi Air Force
- Rank: Lieutenant general
- Commands: Royal Saudi Air Force
- Conflicts: Saudi Arabian-led intervention in Yemen †

Muhammad bin Ahmed Al Shaalan (Arabic: محمد بن أحمد بن عبدالرحمن الشعلان; died June 2015) was a Saudi military officer and commander of the Royal Saudi Air Force (RSAF) from 2014 up until his death in Saudi Arabia.

Al Shaalan was initially reported to have died from a heart attack outside the country by the Ministry of Defense, during the Saudi Arabian-led intervention in the Yemeni civil war. In early June 2015, several Scud missiles were fired by the Houthis from Yemen and hit King Khalid Air Base, which serves as the center of the Saudi air campaign against them; he was killed in the missile attack. Al Shaalan was from a tribal family that spans Saudi Arabia, Jordan, and southern Iraq.

Military offices
Preceded by Lt. Gen. Fayyadh Al Ruwaili	Commander of the Royal Saudi Air Force; 2014—2015	Succeeded by Maj. Gen. Abdullah bin Ibrahim Al Ghamdi (acting)
