= Al-Faris 8-400 =

Al-Faris
- Place of origin: Saudi Arabia

Production history
- Manufacturer: Abdullah Al-Faris Heavy Industries

Specifications
- Mass: 20 tons
- Length: ?
- Width: ?
- Height: ?
- Crew: 3+11
- Armor: ?
- Main armament: 105 mm /
- Secondary armament: 40 mm /
- Engine: twelve-cylinder Deutz air-cooled diesel engine. 480 hp
- Suspension: Wheeled
- Operational range: 600 km
- Maximum speed: 80 km/h

The Al-Faris 8-400 Armored Personnel Carrier, produced by the Abdullah Al-Faris Heavy Industries company, is part of the Al-Faris 8-400 family of armoured vehicles. It was planned to be put into service in the Kingdom's armed forces, but the vehicle never entered into full production.

The APC weighs 20 tons and can carry up to 14 personnel, including the driver and navigator. The personnel carrier is capable of protecting its crew against nuclear, biological and chemical attack. The eight-wheel APC is an all-climate, all-terrain vehicle capable of long-range amphibious operations.

== See also ==
- Al-Fahd Infantry fighting vehicle (50)
- Pindad Panser
