= Advanced Electronics Company Limited =

Saudi Arabian state-owned company

SAMI Advanced Electronics Company
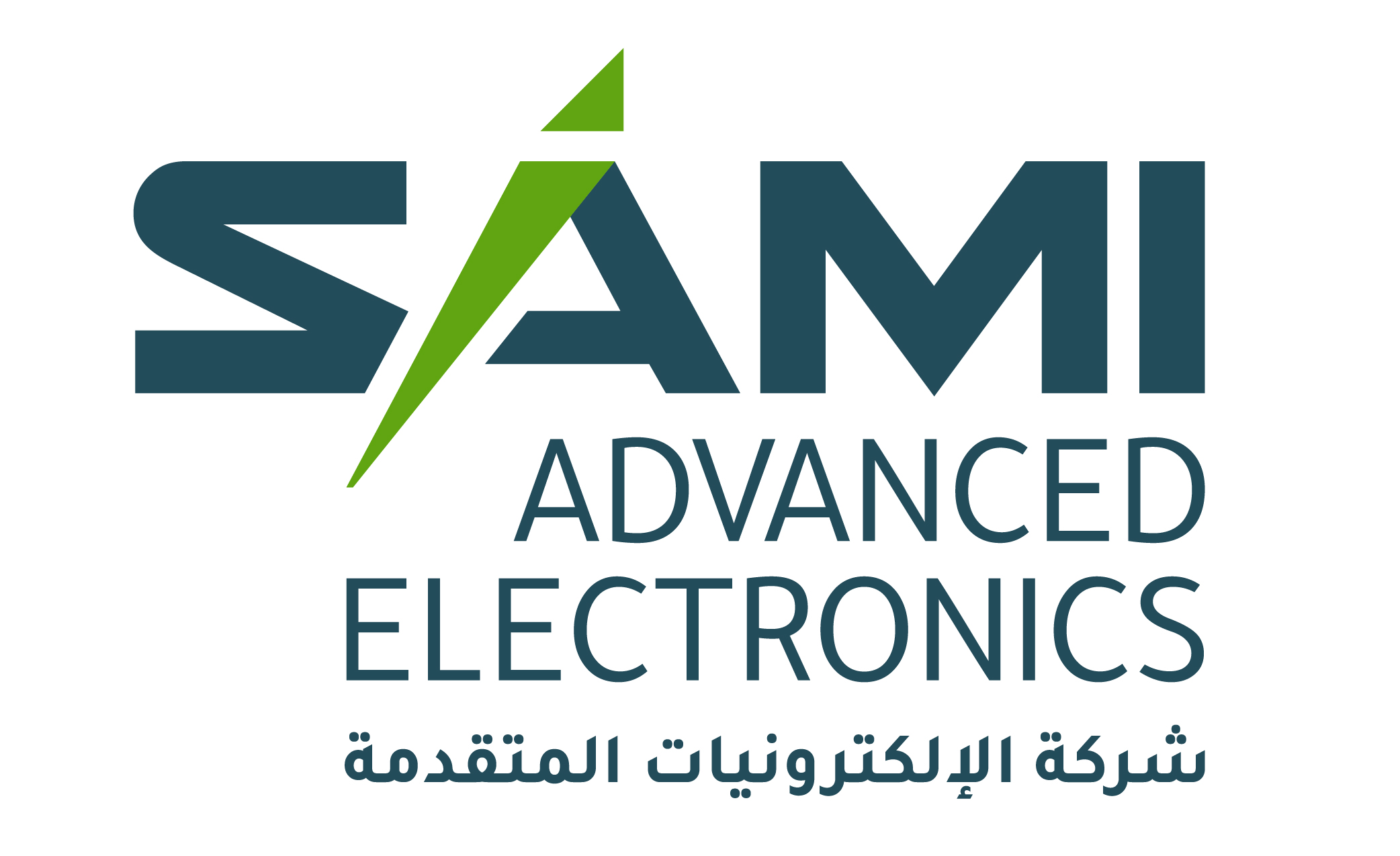

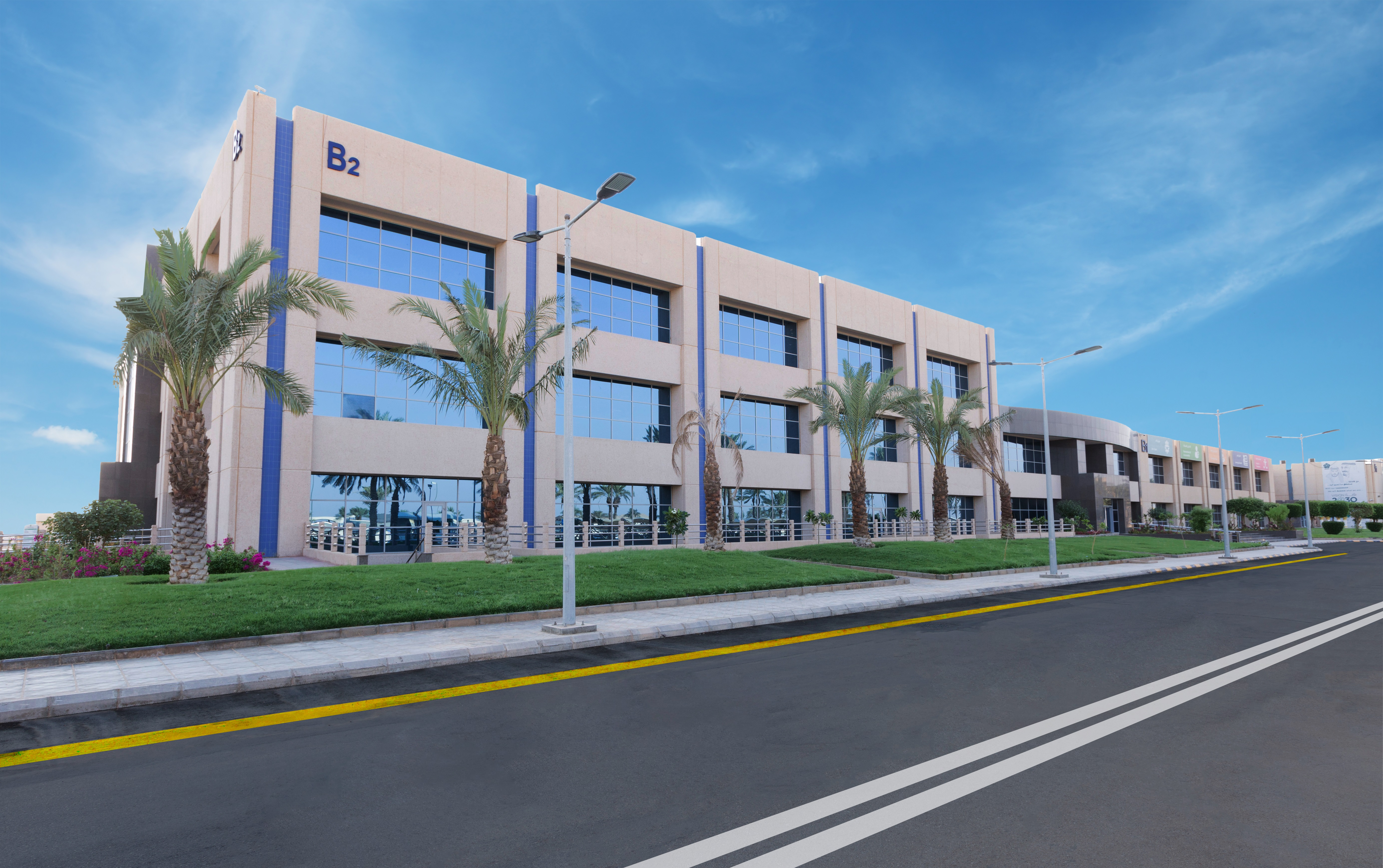
- Industry: Electronics, Military technology, Digital
- Founded: 1988; 38 years ago
- Headquarters: Riyadh, Saudi Arabia
- Area served: Saudi Arabia
- Key people: Ziad Al Musallam (President & CEO)
- Number of employees: 3200+
- Parent: Saudi Arabian Military Industries
- Subsidiaries: Advanced Electronics Support Services Company (AESSCO)
- Website: Official website

Advanced Electronics Company (AEC) is a company in Saudi Arabia that was established in 1988 under the Economic Offset Program as per the directives of the government of Saudi Arabia. AEC is a state owned organization specializing in the field of defense, energy, Digital & security services, and modern electronics. AEC is a subsidiary of state-owned defense company Saudi Arabian Military Industries, whose parent company is Public Investment Fund (PIF).

== Acquisition by Saudi Arabian Military Industries ==
In December 2020, the Saudi Arabian Military Industries (SAMI) fully acquired AEC, making it a 100% Saudi-owned company. The deal shall strengthen SAMI's presence in the defense industries market. It is the largest military industries deal ever concluded in Saudi Arabia.

In 2021, Ziad bin Houmod Al-Musallam was appointed the CEO of AEC.

== See also ==
- Prince Sultan Advanced Technology Research Institute - a Saudi defense research and development partner.
