= Al-Fahd =

Al Fahd
- Type: Armoured fighting vehicle
- Place of origin: Saudi Arabia

Service history
- In service: 1998-present
- Used by: See Operators

Production history
- Manufacturer: Abdallah Al Faris Company for Heavy Industries
- Produced: 1998
- No. built: 240
- Variants: AF-40-8-1 Armoured Personnel Carrier (APC); AF-40-8-2 Armoured Fighting/Reconnaissance Vehicle (AFRV)

Specifications
- Mass: 16.3 t (18.0 short tons) (operating empty weight)
- Length: 7.9 m (26 ft)
- Width: 2.94 m (9.6 ft)
- Height: Varies by suspension setting Cruising: 2.065 m (6.77 ft); Lurking: 1.81 m (5.9 ft); Obstacle: 2.26 m (7.4 ft)
- Crew: 1 (AF-40-8-1); 4 (AF-40-8-2)
- Passengers: 11 (AF-40-8-1 without turret)
- Armour: Steel alloy with Kevlar spall liners
- Main armament: Varies by customer requirements AF-40-8-1: Up to a 40 mm cannon AF-40-8-2: Up to a 105 mm low-recoil cannon
- Engine: AF-40-8-1: Deutz 10-cylinder engine AF-40-8-2: Deutz 12-cylinder, air-cooled engine AF-40-8-1: 400 hp (300 kW); AF-40-8-2: 550 hp (410 kW)
- Payload capacity: Land: 5.5 t (6.1 short tons); Water: 2.2 t (2.4 short tons)
- Transmission: Zahnradfabrik Passau GmbH ZF 6WG-200 powered gearbox
- Suspension: Hydropneumatic adjustable suspension
- Ground clearance: Varies by suspension setting Cruising: 40.5 cm (15.9 in); Lurking: 15 cm (5.9 in); Obstacle: 60 cm (24 in)
- Fuel capacity: 550 L (150 US gal)
- Operational range: AF-40-8-1: 800 km (500 mi); AF-40-8-2: 600 km (370 mi)
- Maximum speed: Road: 90 km/h (56 mph); Cross country: 65 km/h (40 mph); Amphibious: 8 km/h (5.0 mph)

The Al-Fahd is a family of 8x8 armoured fighting vehicle and armoured personnel carrier produced by the Abdallah Al Faris Company for Heavy Industries. The vehicle is mainly used by the Armed Forces of Saudi Arabia. It was the first armored fighting vehicle developed and built-in Saudi Arabia.

The Al Fahd is available in three configurations: The AF-40-8-1; an armoured personnel carrier (APC) or infantry fighting vehicle (IFV) variant, and the AF-40-8-2; an armoured fighting/reconnaissance vehicle (AFRV).

== Design ==
=== Mobility ===
The AF-40-8-1 and AF-40-8-2 are similar in terms of 8-wheeled hull configuration, suspension, and transmission. Internally, however, the vehicles differ in both engine type and engine placement. The AF-40-8-2's larger, 12-cylinder engine is mounted at the rear of the hull, where the AF-40-8-1's 10-cylinder engine is mounted at the front to allow for the troop compartment and rear troop ramp which is not present on or required for the AFRV version.

The Al Fahd uses a variable hydropneumatic suspension which allows the vehicle to adjust its ground clearance by a total of 45 cm (18 in) - between 15 cm (5.9 in) and 60 cm (24 in) - depending on need.

The vehicle is designed to be able to negotiate slopes of up to 80% (forward) and 55% (side), and cross trenches between 2 m (6.6 ft) and 2.5 m (8.2 ft).

There is also an amphibious version of the Al Fahd available depending on customer requirements. The hydraulic propellers are optional, so not all Al Fahd's are capable of an amphibious operation.

=== Protection ===
The Al Fahd uses a high-hardness steel alloy to offer protection against 14 mm ammunition on the frontal arc at ranges of 300 m (980 ft) and greater, and 7.62 mm ammunition at ranges of 25 m (82 ft) and greater on the sides and rear of the vehicle. The vehicle also incorporates multiple layers of Kevlar internally to protect the crew and passengers against spall.

=== Armament ===
The armament for both the AF-40-8-1 and AF-40-8-2 varies according to customer specifications. The AF-40-8-1 is capable of mounting anything up to and including a 40 mm cannon, and the AF-40-8-2 anything up to and including a low-recoil 105 mm cannon, the 105mm cannon can be elevated up high similar to the ST-3

== Operators ==
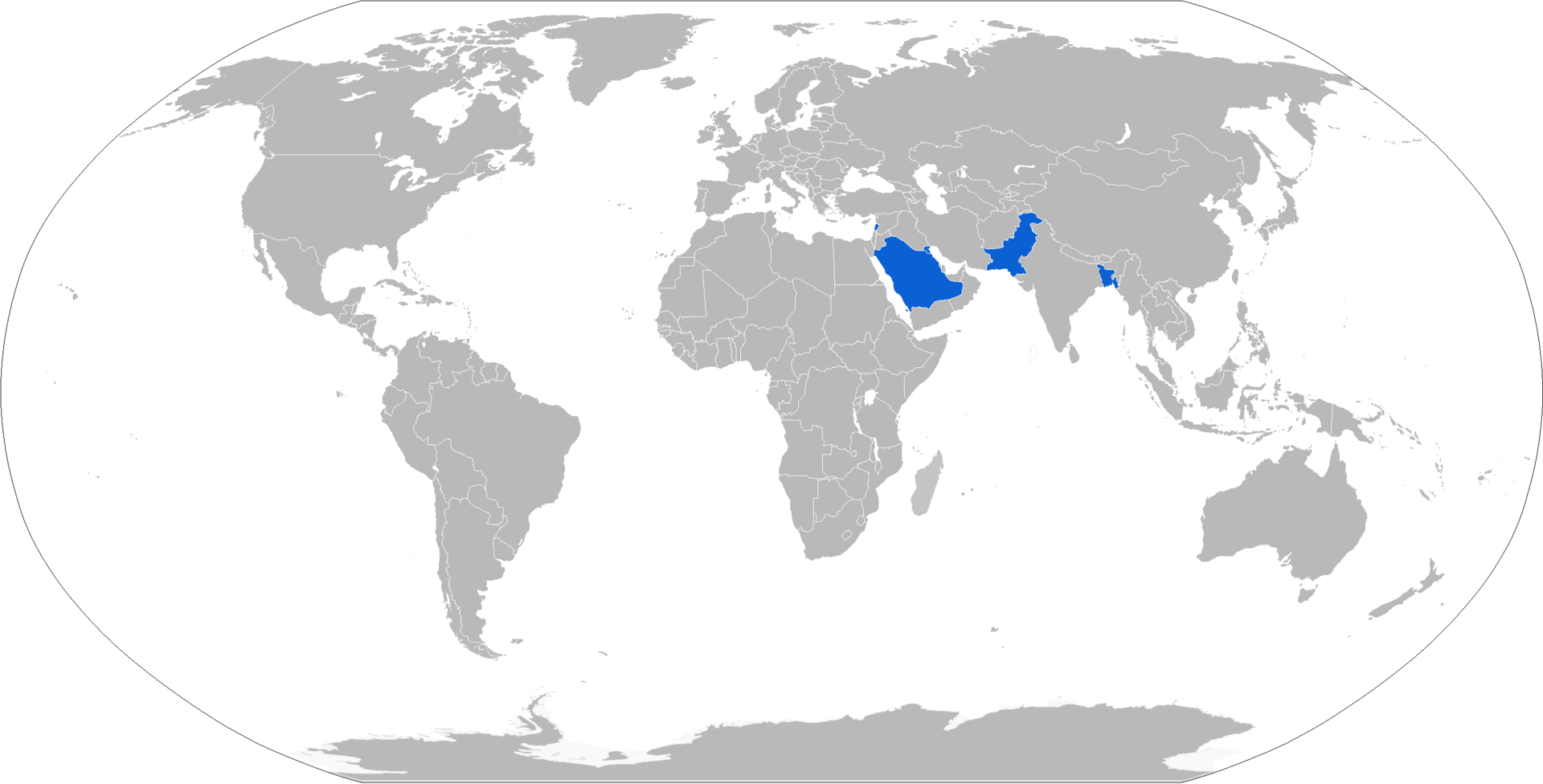
Map of Al-Fahd operators in blue

- Saudi Arabia
- Lebanon
- Kuwait
- Pakistan
- Bangladesh
- algeria
