= Saudi Arabian Military Industries =

Saudi Arabian State-owned military manufacturing company

SAMI
- Logo since 2022
- Native name: الشركة السعودية للصناعات العسكرية
- Type: Private
- Industry: Defense and security
- Founded: May 17, 2017
- Headquarters: Riyadh, Saudi Arabia
- Key people: Khalid bin Salman (Chairman)
- Parent: Public Investment Fund
- Subsidiaries: Advanced Electronics Company Limited; Military Industries Corporation; SAMI Composites; SAMI Aerospace Mechanics; Al-Salam Aerospace Industries
- Website: www.sami.com.sa

Saudi Arabian Military Industries (SAMI; Arabic: الشركة السعودية للصناعات العسكرية) is a Saudi Arabian state-owned defense company. It was established in 2017 and is wholly owned by the Public Investment Fund of Saudi Arabia.

== Activities ==
SAMI was established to provide defense products and services in Saudi Arabia and to reduce the country’s reliance on imported defense products.

The company operates across aerospace, electronics, defense systems, sea, and land systems.

SAMI’s reported targets include the contribution of 14 billion riyals (US$3.7 billion) to the Saudi economy by 2030, 6 billion riyals (US$1.6 billion) investment in research and development and the creation of 40,000 jobs.

== Partnerships ==
In May 2017, SAMI signed Memoranda of Understanding (MOUs) with defense contractors Boeing, Lockheed Martin, Raytheon and General Dynamics.

In October 2017, SAMI signed a Memorandum of Understanding with Russia's Rosoboronexport to manufacture military equipment in Saudi Arabia. The agreement provides for the transfer of technology for the local production of the S-400 Triumf, the Kornet-M system, the TOS-1A, the AGS-30 and the AK-103.

In January 2018, on the sidelines of the launch of the National Industrial Development and Logistics Program, SAMI inked the establishment of two new joint ventures with Thales and John Cockerill. The scope of the joint venture signed with Thales includes short range air defense and counter-rockets radars, C2s, multi-mission missiles, fuses for Guided bomb, and inter-communication radios. The project aims to invest in the facilities and equipment in the local market, at a localization ratio of 70%, while around 2,000 direct and indirect jobs will be generated for Saudi youth. The second joint venture agreement, which is signed with John Cockerill, includes delivering multifunctional high-power turret systems for armored vehicles and all related services, providing in-country research and development and prototyping, design and systems engineering, supplier and material management, manufacturing, assembly and test, fielding and support, and upgrades, and integration of other OEM products and services. The project is expected to realize a localization rate of 60%, in addition to offering more than 700 direct and indirect jobs for the Saudi youth.

In November 2018, SAMI and Navantia announced the launch of their joint venture, ‘SAMI Navantia Naval Industries,’ following the agreement signed by both parties to design and build five Avante 2200 corvettes with Combat Management System for the Ministry of Defense of Saudi Arabia. SAMI Navantia Naval Industries will focus on program management and naval combat system integration, system engineering and architecture, hardware design, and software development, testing and verification, prototyping, simulation, and modelling. In addition, the project includes the installation and integration of combat systems on the last two vessels of the Avante 2200 project, as well as the logistical support and training programs.

In February 2019, SAMI and Naval Group entered into a Memorandum of Agreement to create a joint venture company in Saudi Arabia’s naval defense domain.

On 4 July 2024, SAMI announced the signing of three MOUs with Turkish companies to localize defense industries in Saudi Arabia. The agreements included a partnership with Baykar to set up manufacturing capabilities and develop UAV systems. Another MOU was signed with Aselsan to advance defense electronics technologies. Moreover, SAMI signed a deal with Fergani Space to support emerging space technologies.

== See also ==
- Military Industries Corporation
- Advanced Electronics Company Limited
- Prince Sultan Advanced Technology Research Institute
