= Prince Sultan Advanced Technology Research Institute =

Saudi government research organization

Prince Sultan Advanced Technology Research Institute (PSATRI)
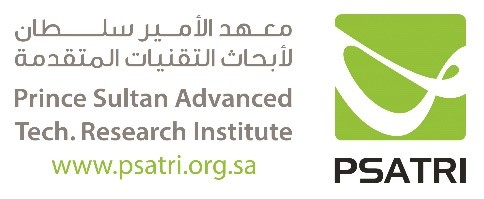
- PSATRI logo
- Formation: 2011; 15 years ago
- Founder: Prince Khalid bin Sultan
- Type: Public
- Location: Riyadh, Saudi Arabia
- Products: Research and Consultancies
- Services: Technical research and applied scientific development
- Fields: Defense research and development
- Affiliations: King Saud University and Royal Saudi Air Force
- Website: psatri.org.sa/index.php

Prince Sultan Advanced Technology Research Institute (PSATRI, Arabic: معهد الأمير سلطان لأبحاث التقنيات المتقدمة, Ma'ahad Al-Amir Sultan le-abhas al-taqniat al-motaqaddemah) is an independent scientific organization of the Saudi government, located in the College of Engineering at King Saud University in the capital city of Riyadh, Saudi Arabia. It has a branch office located in the Business Gate in addition to manufacturing lab and testing sites.

== History ==
The foundation of PSATRI was formed jointly by Royal Saudi Air Force (RSAF) and King Saud University (KSU). In 2008, the Saudi Minister of Defense issued formal approval for PSATRI. In 2011, the Deputy Minister of Defense approved PSATRI's Board of Directors.

The institute works closely with the Royal Saudi Air Force and the various Saudi security and military branches to improve their efficiency, provide specialized studies and scientific consultation.

== Approach of PSATRI ==
PSATRI aims at technology transfer for defense and security sectors. This approach sets it apart from other technology entities in the Kingdom of Saudi Arabia. PSATRI ensures a constant growth of technology to support the development of new products and services for the armed forces through the creation of additional operational capabilities at the end users. PSATRI supports the creation of industry in Saudi Arabia by commercializing and industrializing its technologies.

== Managing Director ==
PSATRI is headed by Dr Sami Alhumaidi, the Managing Director, a PhD degree in Electrical Engineering from Florida Institute of Technology, USA. He accomplished projects in the areas of radar and electronic warfare's serving a number of national committees as Bell Agusta Aerospace Company on electronic defence and UAV. Under his leadership, PSATRI aims at building national capabilities in the defense and security sectors through intensive applied research, technology transfer, innovation and invention with a purpose of self-sufficiency. PSATRI manages the relationship with international companies and strategic clients to achieve its goal.

== Collaboration ==
PSATRI was established to offer – through strategic partnerships and modern technology – advanced research and hands-on experience to the private and military sectors. PSATRI collaborates with its:

1. local clients; RSAF, RSNF, RSLF,
2. local companies such as; Advanced Electronic Company, Alsalam Aircraft Company, and
3. international organizations such as; RAF, British Aerospace, BAE Systems, Agilent Technologies, Danaher Corporation, Dedicated Computing, Boeing, Swedish SAAB, Agusta Bell, Elettronica SpA, Raytheon and others.

== Laboratories at PSATRI ==
PSATRI comprises on several specialized research labs:

1. Communications and Networking Lab is involved in research, education and scholarly activities in the area of communications and networking.
2. Signal and Image processing Lab is to provide solutions focusing on two target areas: Radar signal processing and Satellite imaging.
3. Microwave, Antenna and Radar System Lab performs design, analysis, optimization, fabrication and characterization of miniaturized RF and microwave components and devices based on new breakthroughs in microwave theory and techniques.
4. Electro-Optics Lab aims to engage in design, manufacturing and testing infrared and electro-optical sensors, focal plane arrays and camera systems.
5. Autonomous Vehicles Lab aims at building indigenous capabilities in the field of unmanned autonomous systems(UAS). Current lab activities span several areas such as flight control units, communication systems, ground control systems and various payloads such as gyro-stabilized platforms.
6. Center for Applied Research in Electronic Warfare intends to provide a scientific and technological Electronic warfare capability in order to improve the degree of operational readiness and render effective and efficient support to RSAF.

== Offices ==
PSATRI has its headquarters in its former office located in College of Engineering, King Saud University. The other office functions from the Business gate.

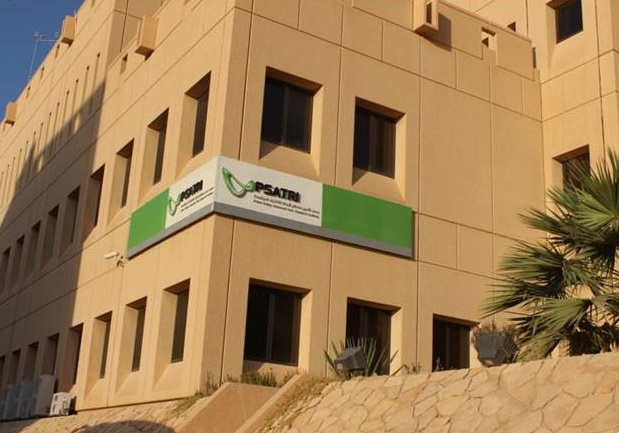
PSATRI's Main Office at King Saud University, Riyadh.

== See also ==
- Prince Sultan Research Center for Environment, Water and Desert
