= Military Industries Corporation =

Subsidiary of Saudi Arabian Military Industries

- Native name: Arabic: المؤسسة العامة للصناعات الحربية
- Type: Government-owned corporation
- Industry: Defence
- Founded: 1953; 73 years ago
- Headquarters: Saudi Arabia
- Key people: Mohamed Al-Mady (President) (since 2015) Mohammed bin Salman (chairman) (since 2015)
- Products: munitions, firearms, armored vehicle
- Revenue: SR2,729,921,000 (2013)
- Parent: Saudi Arabian Military Industries
- Subsidiaries: Armored Vehicles & Heavy Equipment Factory
- Website: mic.gov.sa

Military Industries Corporation (MIC or SAMIC; Arabic: المؤسسة العامة للصناعات الحربية) is a state-owned enterprise in Saudi Arabia founded in 1953. MIC became a subsidiary of Saudi Arabian Military Industries (SAMI) in 2017 following the latter's founding. Based in Riyadh, the MIC manufactures armaments and develops Saudi Arabia's military arsenal through technology transfer and research and development.

== History ==
The notion of delegating the assembly, maintenance and advancement of Saudi military capabilities to a sovereign entity was first introduced by King Abdulaziz Al Saud in 1949. A royal decree was issued, stipulating the establishment of a weapons and artillery plant on September 8, 1950. Contract agreements were concluded with two corporations for the supply of the necessary equipment and apparatus to be installed at the premises of the new factory.

This step was taken with a number of objectives in mind, chief among them was achieving self-sufficiency for the Saudi army. It sought to assert the sovereignty of the kingdom's armed forces and other military sectors in regard of weaponry and ammunition supplies, and aimed to further the training and employment of Saudi nationals. Another key objective was to assimilate and implement relevant industry technologies.

Production at the ammunition factory began in 1953, and was followed by projects to acquire the necessary expertise and to train local plant personnel. A new munitions factory was opened in Al-Kharj in 2016, in partnership with the German/South African company Rheinmetall Denel Munition.

== Products ==
- Firearms

H&K G3 rifle

H&K G36 rifle (v basic, c compact, K short ) Variants

H&K MP5 SMG

AK-103

- Armored vehicles

Al Shibl 1

Al Shibl 2

Aldahna

Tuwaiq

- Trucks

Tatra truck T810

Tatra truck T815-7

Tatra truck T158

- Ammunition

5.56×45mm

7.62×51mm

9×19mm

12.7mm

20 mm (M55 training, M56 HE, M53 Armor Penetration)

25 mm (M791 HE, M792 penetration, M793 training)

30 mm (Apache Ammunition) (M789 HE, M788 training )

81 mm Mortars shells

105 mm Artillery shells

155 mm Artillery shells

General-purpose bombs MK 81, MK 82, MK 83, MK 84.

== Aims and objectives ==
MIC seeks to accommodate the needs and requirements of Saudi Arabia's military sectors, acquiring technologies and building up military industries that are capable of keeping up with advancements in the Armed Forces. Its strategy includes:

1. Recruiting, developing and retaining a national work force. By agreement with the Ministry of Education it has awarded scholarships to 5,000 engineering students, who enter employment with the Corporation upon graduation.
2. Managing and developing MIC factories and plants.
3. Achieving integration among MIC, the military sectors and government agencies.
4. Cooperating with private sector entities, internally and externally, especially in the field of joint manufacturing.
5. Conducting research in collaboration with national and international universities and research centers; enabling technology transfer among these institutes, and establishing its own research centers.

== Human resource policy ==
MIC is a public corporation enjoying independent financial and administrative status, applying Civil Service and Labor regulations with its employees. It has provided 1,200 housing units for employees, equipped with schools, convenience stores, and health and recreation facilities. It states that it supports its employees professionally and vocationally through training programs and skill-enhancing workshops.

== See also ==
- Saudi Arabian Military Industries
