= Saudi Arabia and weapons of mass destruction =

The Kingdom of Saudi Arabia has not officially maintained or possessed the weapons of mass destruction (WMD). In 1972, Saudi Arabia signed and ratified the Biological Weapons Convention, followed by the ratification of Chemical Weapons Convention (1996) and Nuclear Non-Proliferation Treaty (1998).

Over the issue of nuclear energy, Saudi Arabia has made steps towards a peaceful nuclear program and according to some observations, the program can hypothetically be weaponized towards developing nuclear weapons.

In 2018, Mohammad bin Salman, the Crown Prince of Saudi Arabia, confirmed on interview given to American CBS's 60 Minutes that Saudi Arabia would develop nuclear weapons if Iran successfully detonated one, causing widespread distrust of the Saudi Arabian nuclear program.

In July 2026, the United States and Saudi Arabia finalized a 123 Agreement for Saudi Arabia to build a civilian nuclear program.

== Overview ==
The Kingdom of Saudi Arabia has officially a signed party of and ratified the Treaty on the Non-Proliferation of Nuclear Weapons since 1988. At the nuclear energy governance level, the Saudi government has an agreement with the International Atomic Energy Agency.

=== Nuclear program ===
The Saudi interests in nuclear issue started in 2010 when it announced to start the program aim to look for generating electricity using the nuclear power and Saudi officials reached out the France, South Korea, Russia, China, and the United States to help establish the industry.

The Saudi government established the King Abdullah City for Atomic and Renewable Energy (KA CARE) as a government agency to oversee the program and commissioned the Pöyry PLC, a Finnish engineering consulting firm, to assist in expounding "high-level strategy in the area of nuclear and renewable energy applications" with desalination.

The Saudi Arabian nuclear program received much more publicized controversy when it reached out to Pakistan in an attempt to establish a nuclear physics laboratory, which can be purposed towards understanding the nuclear weapons environment.

On 17 September 2020, according to a confidential report compiled by the China National Nuclear Corporation (CNNC) and the Beijing Research Institute of Uranium Geology (BRIUG), as seen by The Guardian, Saudi Arabia was identified to have enough uranium ore reserves to begin domestic production of nuclear fuel. Saudi Arabia was found heading as another country in the Arab region, after the United Arab Emirates, to begin its own nuclear energy program. Chinese data revealed that Saudi was capable of producing nearly 90,000 tonnes of uranium. Saudi Arabia was working with Chinese geologists to identify the uranium deposits that were located in Saudi's northwestern region, where the Crown Prince Mohammed bin Salman was planning to build the Neom city. There were concerns, where Saudi was under suspicions of producing nuclear weapons, as it lacked transparency. Saudi Arabia followed the IAEA's Small Quantities Protocol regulations which did not allow direct inspections of Saudi nuclear facilities.

=== Alleged pursuits and statements on nuclear weapons ===
In 1987, the Saudi Arabian secret procurement of the CSS-2 intermediate-range ballistic missiles from China raised the concerns of proliferation of missiles during the Iran-Iraq War. In 1994, Saudi Arabia was alleged to provide funding of the Iraqi nuclear program in a larger view of transferring the nuclear technology by the defecting senior Saudi diplomat Mohammad al-Khilewi– his claims were later proved unsubstantiated by the U.S. investigators. After the U.S. invasion of Iraq in 2003, The Guardian and GlobalSecurity.org reported that Saudi Arabia had renewed its interest in nuclear weapons, while in 2005 The New York Times claimed that U.S. President George W. Bush indicated to British Prime Minister Tony Blair that he was open to a preemptive strikes to prevent Saudi Arabia from acquiring nuclear weapons.

In 2009, when King Abdullah of Saudi Arabia warned visiting U.S. special envoy to the Middle East Dennis Ross that if Iran crossed the threshold, "we will get nuclear weapons", since then, the Kingdom has sent the Americans numerous signals of its intentions. On March 15, 2018 Saudi defense minister and heir to the throne Prince Mohammad bin Salman made such a statement on the CBS 60 Minutes program.

Over the years, Saudi Arabia has fostered and forged special relations with Pakistan, a nuclear power, and there exists an official agreement focusing primarily on security and defense matters much less than trade and economic development. This nature of relationship between an influential Arab state and a nuclear power has attracted substantial speculation of purchasing of a nuclear warhead in the Western news media. Although, the Saudi foreign ministry had not confirmed on possibility of purchasing a nuclear warhead, Pakistan through its ambassador, Naeem Khan, did reaffirmed the defense ties with the Kingdom in 2012.

In 2013, the BBC Persia, using multiple sources from previously reported, had fueled this speculations furthermore when leveling the serious allegations on Saudi Arabia by approaching to Pakistan for purchasing the nuclear warhead with a "belief" that they are able to gain access to nuclear weapons "at will". The European and Israeli diplomats did echoed the BBC Persia's report indicating that nuclear warheads which have been manufactured in Pakistan by the request of Riyadh, are "ready for delivery."

The Sharif administration (2013–17) in Pakistan had to sustained intense criticism coming from the Obama administration (2009–17), which had witnessed the tense relations between Pakistan–United States, and the Obama administration staffers had privately told The Times that "Riyadh could have the nuclear warheads in a matter of days of approaching Islamabad." The Obama administration senior staffer, Gary Samore, who until March 2013 was President Barack Obama's counter-proliferation adviser, was of the view with the BBC Newsnight: "I do think that the Saudis believe that they have some understanding with Pakistan that, in extremis, they would have claim to acquire nuclear weapons from Pakistan."

In 2019, the House Committee on Oversight and Reform in the United States Congress reported that President Donald Trump planned to provide nuclear technology to Saudi Arabia in violation of the Atomic Energy Act. The nuclear reactors were planned to be built by the American contractor, IP3 International, while negotiations were conducted by senior advisor Jared Kushner and U.S. Energy Secretary Rick Perry. The report caused widespread condemnation from both Republican and Democratic lawmakers in both houses of Congress due in part to the recent assassination of Saudi dissident, Jamal Khashoggi, and the conduct of the Saudi Arabian war in Yemen. In the U.S. Senate, Senators Ed Markey and Marco Rubio introduced a bill, The Saudi Nuclear Proliferation Act, to block the deal. Concerns were also directed about whether the deal would entail access to uranium enrichment technology. In response U.S. Deputy Energy Secretary Dan Brouillette claimed that Saudi Arabia would sign a Section 123 agreement restricting how Saudi Arabia could use nuclear technology.

In May 2025, U.S. Congresswoman Marjorie Taylor Greene, a member of the counterterrorism and intelligence subcommittee of the House Homeland Security Committee, stated that "Saudi Arabia has nuclear weapons". She did not offer further clarification.

=== Missile capability and delivery mechanism ===
In 1986–87, Saudi Arabia secretly negotiated with China, and purchased Chinese-made CSS-2 intermediate-range ballistic missiles, which are nuclear capable in Chinese service, but reportedly sold to Saudi Arabia with conventional high-explosive warheads. However their low circular error probable accuracy (1–1.5 km (0.62–0.93 mi)) makes them unsuitable for effective military use against military targets when carrying a conventional warhead. The CSS-2 has a range of 4,850 km (3,010 mi) with a payload of either 2,150 kg (4,740 lb) or 2,500 kg (5,500 lb). These missiles were delivered with between 35 to 50 transporter erector launcher trucks. Initially in March 2006, the German magazine, Cicero, incorrectly alleged that Saudi Arabia had received these missiles from Pakistan while misreporting by publishing the satellite photos that revealed a missile silo, which misidentified, and confused the CSS missiles to that of the Ghauri nuclear warheads in Al-Sulaiyil, south of the capital Riyadh, followed by another missile silo site in al-Watah.

In 2013, the existence of a separate branch of Saudi Arabia's armed forces, the Royal Saudi Strategic Missile Force was officially announced, and these missiles were first placed for public viewing in 2014.

The American political outlet, the Newsweek, quoted an anonymous source in 2014 that Saudi Arabia had acquired CSS-5 intermediate-range ballistic missiles from China in 2007 with "Bush administration's quiet approval on the condition that CIA technical experts could verify they were not designed to carry nuclear warheads". The Center for Strategic and International Studies lists the CSS-5 as being capable of carrying either 250-kiloton or 500-kiloton nuclear or various types of conventional high-explosive warheads. The CSS-5, while it has a comparatively shorter range (2,800 km (1,700 mi) ) and half the payload (1 ton) of the CSS-2, is solid-fueled, thus can be set up and placed on alert status more easily than the liquid-fueled CSS-2, and its accuracy is much greater (circular error probable of 30 meters).

In technical evaluation and examination completed by the American Central Intelligence Agency (CIA) reportedly concluded that the "modified nosecones" and that nuclear warheads that might be purchased from China could not be fitted.

The conventional missile capability is widely understood in a context of deterrence against the Iranian missile program.

== Chemical and biological weapons ==
In 1972, Saudi Arabia ratified and signed the Biological Weapons Convention (BWC), followed by the Chemical Weapons Convention (CWC) in 1996.

There are no known biotechnological or chemical infrastructure in the Saudi Arabia nor the Saudi Arabian government ever suspected of possession of such weapons.

== See also ==
- Nuclear power in Saudi Arabia
- Nuclear program of Saudi Arabia
