= Nuclear program of Saudi Arabia =

There are no verified reports indicating that Saudi Arabia maintains a nuclear weapons program. From an official and public standpoint, Saudi Arabia has been an opponent of nuclear weapons in the Middle East, having signed the Treaty on the Non-Proliferation of Nuclear Weapons, and is a member of the coalition of countries demanding a nuclear weapon free zone in the Middle East. Intelligence assessment on nuclear proliferation have not listed Saudi Arabia as a country of concern, and the United States has formed the IP3 International to transfer the civilian nuclear technology to Saudi Arabia on June 2016.

However, over the years there have been media reports of Saudi Arabia's intent to purchase a nuclear weapon from an outside source. In 2003, a leaked strategy paper laid out three possible options for the Saudi government: to acquire a nuclear deterrent, to ally with and become protected by an existing nuclear nation, or to try to reach agreement on having a nuclear-free Middle East. The UN officials and IAEA weapons experts have suggested the review was prompted by a distancing of relations with the United States, concerns over Iran's nuclear program, and a lack of international pressure on Israel to give up its nuclear weapons.

In July 2026, the United States and Saudi Arabia finalized a 123 Agreement for Saudi Arabia to build a civilian nuclear program.

== Overview ==
=== Foreign collaboration ===
The Saudi interests in nuclear power began in April 2010 when Saudi government in Riyadh declared to start a nuclear power program, initially without the cooperation from other nuclear power nations, with the statement: "The development of atomic energy is essential to meet the Kingdom's growing requirements for energy to generate electricity, produce desalinated water and reduce reliance on depleting hydrocarbon resources". The Saudi government set-up the agency, the King Abdullah City for Atomic and Renewable Energy (KA-CARE) to oversee the civilian nuclear program while commissioning the Finnish consulting firm, Pöyry PLC to assists in expounding "high-level strategy in the area of nuclear and renewable energy applications" with desalination.

In 2015, Saudi Arabia reached and signed an agreement with South Korea to start the work on the reactor technology (SMART reactors) to be jointly developed by Korea Atomic Energy Research Institute (KAERI) and the KA-CARE. In 2017, Saudi Arabia signed an agreement with China to explore the uranium as a joint venture between Chinese National Nuclear Corporation and the Saudi Geological Survey.

=== Allegations on Pakistan ===
The western media outlets have widely speculated that Saudi Arabia had been a major investor of Pakistan's covert nuclear weapons program since 1974, a program founded by former prime minister Zulfikar Ali Bhutto. In early 1980s, President Zia-ul-Haq had allegedly told the Saudi dignitaries that "Our achievements are yours". In May 1998, the Saudi Arabia played a key role in stabilizing the country's economy when the decision was made to conduct the nuclear weapons testing in a view of balancing the act of power in South Asia. In June 1998, Prime minister Nawaz Sharif publicly thanked King Fahd doing his farewell visit to the Kingdom. In 1999, Prime minister Sharif approved the request of Saudi Minister of Defense Prince Sultan to visit the country's nuclear physics laboratories, which raised the concerns of nuclear proliferation.

After this visit, the European diplomats and media have long suspected that "an agreement" exists between two nations in which Pakistan would sell Saudi Arabia a nuclear warhead if the security in the Persian Gulf deteriorate. These allegations have been sharply denied and refuted by both nations.

In March 2006, the German magazine, Cicero, alleged that Saudi Arabia has been receiving assistance from Pakistan to acquire missiles with published satellite photos that revealed a missile silo with nuclear silos allegedly containing the Ghauri nuclear warheads in Al-Sulaiyil, south of the capital Riyadh, followed by another missile silo site in al-Watah. The Government of Pakistan has sharply denied the allegations in aiding Saudi Arabia in its nuclear ambitions.

In 2013, the British Broadcasting Corporation (BBC), which used multiple past sources, again leveled allegations on Pakistan by providing the Saudis with the nuclear warhead with and various sources also telling the BBC Persian, regarding Saudi government belief that they are able to gain nuclear weapons at will.

The Obama administration (2009–17), which had witnessed the tense relations between Pakistan–United States, had told The Times that "Riyadh could have the nuclear warheads in a matter of days of approaching Islamabad." On commenting of the security in the Gulf region, the Pakistan Ambassador to Saudi Arabia, Muhammad Naeem, reaffirmed his country's commitment to the Saudi Arabia as the "security of the Kingdom not just as a diplomatic or an internal matter but as a personal matter with the Saudi leadership considered Pakistan and Saudi Arabia to be one country. Any threat to Saudi Arabia is also a threat to Pakistan." Nonetheless, the allegations were leveled up on Pakistan with European intelligence sources having been told The Guardian that the Saudi monarchy has paid for up to 60% of the Pakistan's atomic bomb projects and in return has the option to buy five to six nuclear warheads off the shelf.

In 2013, British journalist, Mark Urban and Amos Yadlin, a former head of Israeli military intelligence, told a conference in Sweden that if Iran got the bomb, "the Saudis will not wait one month. They already paid for the bomb, they will go to Pakistan and bring what they need to bring." Since 2009, when King Abdullah of Saudi Arabia warned visiting U.S. special envoy to the Middle East Dennis Ross that if Iran crossed the threshold, "we will get nuclear weapons", the Kingdom has sent the Americans numerous signals of its intentions. Gary Samore, who until March 2013 was President Barack Obama's counter-proliferation adviser, told BBC Newsnight: "I do think that the Saudis believe that they have some understanding with Pakistan that, in extremis, they would have claim to acquire nuclear weapons from Pakistan."

==== Response ====
The Government of Pakistan have denied the existence of any such agreement, followed by the confirmation from Saudi Arabia. According to the American based think-tank, the Center for Strategic and International Studies, the BBC report on possible nuclear sharing between Pakistan and Saudi Arabia is partially incorrect. There is no indication of the validity or credibility of the BBC’s sources, nor does the article expand on what essentially constitutes an unverified lead. It noted that if Pakistan were to transfer nuclear warheads onto Saudi soil, it is highly unlikely that either nation would face any international repercussions if both nations were to follow strict nuclear sharing guidelines similar to that of NATO. A research paper produced by the British House of Commons Defence Select Committee states that as long as current NATO nuclear sharing arrangements remain in place, NATO states would have few valid grounds for complaint if such a transfer were to occur.

=== Nuclear deal with United States ===
In May 2008, the United States and Saudi Arabia signed a memorandum of understanding, as part of the United States' vintage Atoms for Peace program, to boost Saudi efforts for a civilian nuclear program. The program did not involve support for the development of nuclear weapons.

=== Nuclear deal with China ===
In January 2012, Chinese Premier Wen Jiabao signed a mutual cooperation deal on nuclear energy with King Abdullah, during Premier Jiabao's visit to the Middle East. The details of such cooperation were not fully provided by the government-controlled Saudi Press Agency, but according to Hashim Yamani, president of the King Abdullah City for Atomic and Renewable Energy, the kingdom has planned 16 commercial nuclear power reactors by 2030.

== Saudi financing of Iraqi nuclear program ==
In 1994, Mohammed al Khilewi, second-in-command of the Saudi mission to the United Nations, applied for asylum in the United States. He provided a packet of 14,000 documents that allegedly described long-time Saudi support of the Iraqi nuclear weapons program. According to these documents, during Saddam Hussein's administration in Iraq the Saudis supported the Iraqi nuclear program with $5 billion, on the condition that workable nuclear technology and possibly even nuclear weapons would be transferred to Saudi Arabia. Khilewi obtained asylum in the US, with the consent of Saudi Arabia. Khilewi's allegations have not been confirmed by any other source. US officials have stated that they have no evidence of Saudi assistance to Iraqi nuclear development. Saudi officials denied the allegations.

Senior Clinton administration officials responsible for Mideast affairs at the time Khilewi sought asylum, including Robert Pelletreau of the State Department and Bruce Riedel of the National Security Council, said they found nothing in Khilewi's debriefings to back up the Media reports about a Saudi nuclear program. "There was nothing there," Pelletreau said. (Vartan 2005)

== Nuclear sharing with Arab States of the Persian Gulf nuclear programs ==
The Arab States of the Persian Gulf plan to start their own joint civilian nuclear program. An agreement in the final days of the Bush administration provided for cooperation between the United Arab Emirates and the United States of America in which the United States would sell the UAE nuclear reactors and nuclear fuel. The UAE would, in return, renounce their right to enrich uranium for their civilian nuclear program. At the time of signing, this agreement was touted as a way to reduce risks of nuclear proliferation in the Persian Gulf. However, Mustafa Alani of the Dubai-based Gulf Research Center stated that, should the Nuclear Non-Proliferation Treaty collapse, nuclear reactors such as those slated to be sold to the UAE under this agreement could provide the UAE with a path toward a nuclear weapon, raising the specter of further nuclear proliferation. In March 2007, foreign ministers of the six-member Gulf Cooperation Council met in Saudi Arabia to discuss progress in plans agreed in December 2006, for a joint civilian nuclear program.

== Recent developments ==
In 2011, Prince Turki al-Faisal, who has served as the Saudi intelligence chief and as ambassador to the United States has suggested that the kingdom might consider producing nuclear weapons if it found itself between the atomic arsenals of Iran and Israel. In 2012, it was confirmed that Saudi Arabia would launch its own nuclear weapons program immediately if Iran successfully developed nuclear weapons. In such an eventuality, Saudi Arabia would start work on a new ballistic missile platform, purchase nuclear warheads from overseas and aim to source uranium to develop weapons-grade material.

=== 2015 ===
In May 2015, in response to The Sunday Times of London report that the Saudis had "taken the 'strategic decision' to acquire 'off-the-shelf' atomic weapons from Pakistan," amid growing fears of a nuclear-armed Iran, a Saudi defense official dismissed it as speculation.

=== 2018 ===
In March 2018, the crown prince said if Iran decided to build a nuclear weapon, "we will follow suit as soon as possible". This prompted U.S. Senator Ed Markey to comment "nuclear energy in Saudi Arabia is about more than just electrical power", implying Saudi Arabia was interested in nuclear power to gain the skills to be able to develop weapons. This potentially reduces the probability of a nuclear deal with the U.S.

in May 2018, Al Jazeera media reported the statement from the former director of Al Arabiya TV, Abdul Rahman Al-Rashed, who wrote in the Ash-Sharq Al-Awsat newspaper an article while accompanying Prince Mohammed bin Salman on his recent visit to Washington that no one can confirm if Saudi Arabia is capable of building a nuclear weapon yet. However, the news former director has pointed out that Riyadh owns uranium materials in its desert, and has adopted a plan to extract it within 2030.

=== 2019 ===
In March, Donald Trump's administration approved a deal allowing Saudi Arabia access to nuclear secrets through the U.S. energy secretary Rick Perry, with an approval known as Part 810 authorizations. Although it doesn't allow to access equipment required to process Uranium, it allows the 6 companies involved to do preliminary work on nuclear power ahead of any deal. In a document from the Department of Energy’s National Nuclear Security Administration (NNSA) each of the companies which received access requested that the NNSA withhold their authorization from public release.

=== 2020 ===
According to reports, Saudi Arabia initiated the construction of its first research reactor at the King Abdulaziz City for Science and Technology. In May 2020, satellite images revealed that a roof concealed the cylindrical reactor vessel, which was visible through roof beams in a satellite picture until 15 March 2020. The Kingdom was using the division for the generation of electricity, to export crude consumed for domestic energy needs, generate more revenue for the government, and create a handful of job opportunities. However, experts raised a doubt, as the country already possessed cheaper, safer, and renewable ways to achieve these objectives from sunlight. It was also reported that Saudi Arabia did not sign up to halt the enrichment of uranium, reprocessing of spent fuel and neither signed the 123 Agreement with the United States.

Saudi Arabia constructed a facility for extracting uranium yellowcake from uranium ore with the help of China. According to a western official, the facility was built near the remote town of AlUla. Saudi Arabia has signed most limited safeguard agreement with the International Atomic Energy Agency.

On 17 September 2020, The Guardian reported Saudi Arabia of being in possession of enough uranium ore reserves to produce 90,000 tonnes worth of uranium. It stated the finding on the basis of the reports compiled by the Beijing Research Institute of Uranium Geology (BRIUG) and the China National Nuclear Corporation (CNNC), in association with Saudi Geological survey. As per the reports, three different deposits in the central and northwest region of the country were reported to be potential for the extraction. The disclosure reportedly increased concerns regarding Riyadh’s aggressive interest in developing atomic weapons program. In this report geologists identified some reserves near the controversial Neom megacity development are and estimated that Saudi could produce over 90,000 tonnes of uranium from three deposits.

=== 2023 ===
In January 2023, Saudi Arabian Energy Minister Prince Abdulaziz Bin Salman said Saudi Arabia plans to use domestically-sourced uranium in its future nuclear power industry, including developing the full nuclear fuel cycle. He said "This would involve the entire nuclear fuel cycle which involves the production of yellowcake, low enriched uranium and the manufacturing of nuclear fuel both for our national use and, of course, for export."

=== 2025 ===
In May 2025, U.S. Congresswoman Marjorie Taylor Greene, a member of the counterterrorism and intelligence subcommittee of the House Homeland Security Committee, stated on Twitter that "Saudi Arabia has nuclear weapons". She did not offer further clarification.

=== 2026 ===
In July 2026, CNN reported that the Trump administration has agreed to allow Saudi Arabia to enrich uranium without enacting international safeguards on nuclear weapons. Although U.S.–Saudi nuclear negotiations concluded in October 2025, the draft nuclear accords outlining U.S. support for a Saudi nuclear program is pending U.S. President Donald Trump's signature.

In July 2026, United States President Donald Trump approved an agreement with Saudi Arabia that will provide the kingdom with uranium enrichment capability for its civilian nuclear program. The deal will last 30 years and is also expected to involve U.S. firms in developing the program. The deal would allow for the building of a uranium enrichment facility in Saudi Arabia. The agreement does not include the IAEA’s "Additional Protocol" which grants the U.N.'s International Atomic Energy Agency broad and more intrusive oversight of a country's nuclear activities, such as the power to carry out snap inspections at undeclared locations.

== Missile capability ==
In 1987, Saudi Arabia secretly negotiated and purchased Chinese-made CSS-2 intermediate-range ballistic missiles, designed and used by the China as a nuclear-armed missile, but reportedly sold to Saudi Arabia with conventional high-explosive warheads. However their low circular error probable accuracy (1–1.5 km (0.62–0.93 mi)) makes them unsuitable for effective military use against military targets when carrying a conventional warhead. The CSS-2 has a range of 4,850 km (3,010 mi) with a payload of either 2,150 kg (4,740 lb) or 2,500 kg (5,500 lb). These missiles were delivered with between 35 to 50 transporter erector launcher trucks. These missiles were the first weapons of the Royal Saudi Strategic Missile Force, a separate branch of Saudi Arabia's armed forces. In 2013, the existence of the Royal Saudi Strategic Missile Force was officially announced.

The American political outlet, the Newsweek, quoted an anonymous source in 2014 that Saudi Arabia had acquired CSS-5 intermediate-range ballistic missiles from China in 2007 with "Bush administration's quiet approval on the condition that CIA technical experts could verify they were not designed to carry nuclear warheads". The Center for Strategic and International Studies lists the CSS-5 as being capable of carrying either 250-kiloton or 500-kiloton nuclear or various types of conventional high-explosive warheads. The CSS-5, while it has a comparatively shorter range (2,800 km (1,700 mi) ) and half the payload (1 ton) of the CSS-2, is solid-fueled, thus can be set up and placed on alert status more easily than the liquid-fueled CSS-2, and its accuracy is much greater (circular error probable of 30 meters).

== See also ==
- Nuclear power in Saudi Arabia
- Saudi Arabia and weapons of mass destruction
