= Paramilitary forces of Pakistan =

Pakistan operates a number of paramilitary forces alongside the Pakistan Armed Forces and police forces:

- Civil Armed Forces
  - Punjab Rangers
  - Sindh Rangers
  - Frontier Corps Khyber Pakhtunkhwa (North)
  - Frontier Corps Khyber Pakhtunkhwa (South)
  - Frontier Corps Balochistan (North)
  - Frontier Corps Balochistan (South)
  - Federal Constabulary
  - Pakistan Coast Guards
  - Gilgit-Baltistan Scouts
- Airports Security Force
- Pakistan Maritime Security Agency
- Anti Narcotics Force
- National Guard
  - Mujahid Force
  - Janbaz Force
- Pakistan Levies (split and localized)
  - Balochistan Levies
  - Dir Levies
  - Gilgit-Baltistan Levies Force
  - Khyber Pakhtunkhwa Levies
  - Malakand Levies

== Former paramilitary forces ==
- Al-Badr in East Pakistan (now Bangladesh)
- Al-Shams in East Pakistan
- Azad Kashmir Regular Force (now the fully military Azad Kashmir Regiment)
- East Pakistan Rifles (now the Border Guards Bangladesh)
- Federal Security Force, a secret police from 1972-1977
- Gilgit Scouts (now the fully military Northern Light Infantry Regiment but see Gilgit-Baltistan Scouts above)
- Khasadar, disbanded in 2019
- Mehran Force, replaced by the Pakistan Rangers (Sindh)
- Razakar in East Pakistan
- National Cadet Corps (Pakistan) previously trained students for military service, formally part of the National Guard of Pakistan
- Women's Guard, women's auxiliary service for national emergencies, formally part of the National Guard of Pakistan

== See also ==
- Law enforcement in Pakistan
