= 2026 Saudi Arabia–United States nuclear deal =

Bilateral nuclear treaty between Saudi Arabia and the United States

Saudi Arabia–United States Nuclear Agreement
Saudi Arabia–United States Agreement for Cooperation on the Peaceful Uses of Nuclear Energy
- Type: Section 123 Agreement
- Signed: July 22, 2026
- Ratified: TBD
- Signatories: (Saudi Arabia) Abdulaziz bin Salman Al Saud; (United States) Chris Wright
- Parties: Saudi Arabia; United States

In July 2026 Saudi Arabia and the United States signed a Section 123 Agreement allowing for Saudi Arabia to build a civilian nuclear program.

It was signed by United States Secretary of Energy Chris Wright and Saudi Minister of Energy Abdulaziz bin Salman Al Saud on July 22. The deal has to be approved by the United States Congress in order for it to be become official. The United States Department of Energy has to send the deal to Congress for a vote. Under the Atomic Energy Act of 1946 the deal has to be approved within 90 days after being submitted to Congress and Congress has to either adopt a joint resolution disapproving the agreement or let it automatically take effect.

== Negotiations ==
According to The New York Times, the Biden administration originally began pursuing a nuclear deal with Saudi Arabia as part of a larger agreement for the country to recognize Israel. In April 2025, United States Secretary of Energy Chris Wright told reporters that the Trump administration was talking to Saudi officials on giving Saudi Arabia access to U.S. nuclear technology and potentially allowing the country to enrich uranium. Both sides concluded negotiations in October 2025.

In February 2026, U.S. President Donald Trump told Congress that he was seeking a civilian nuclear deal with Saudi Arabia.

== Agreement ==
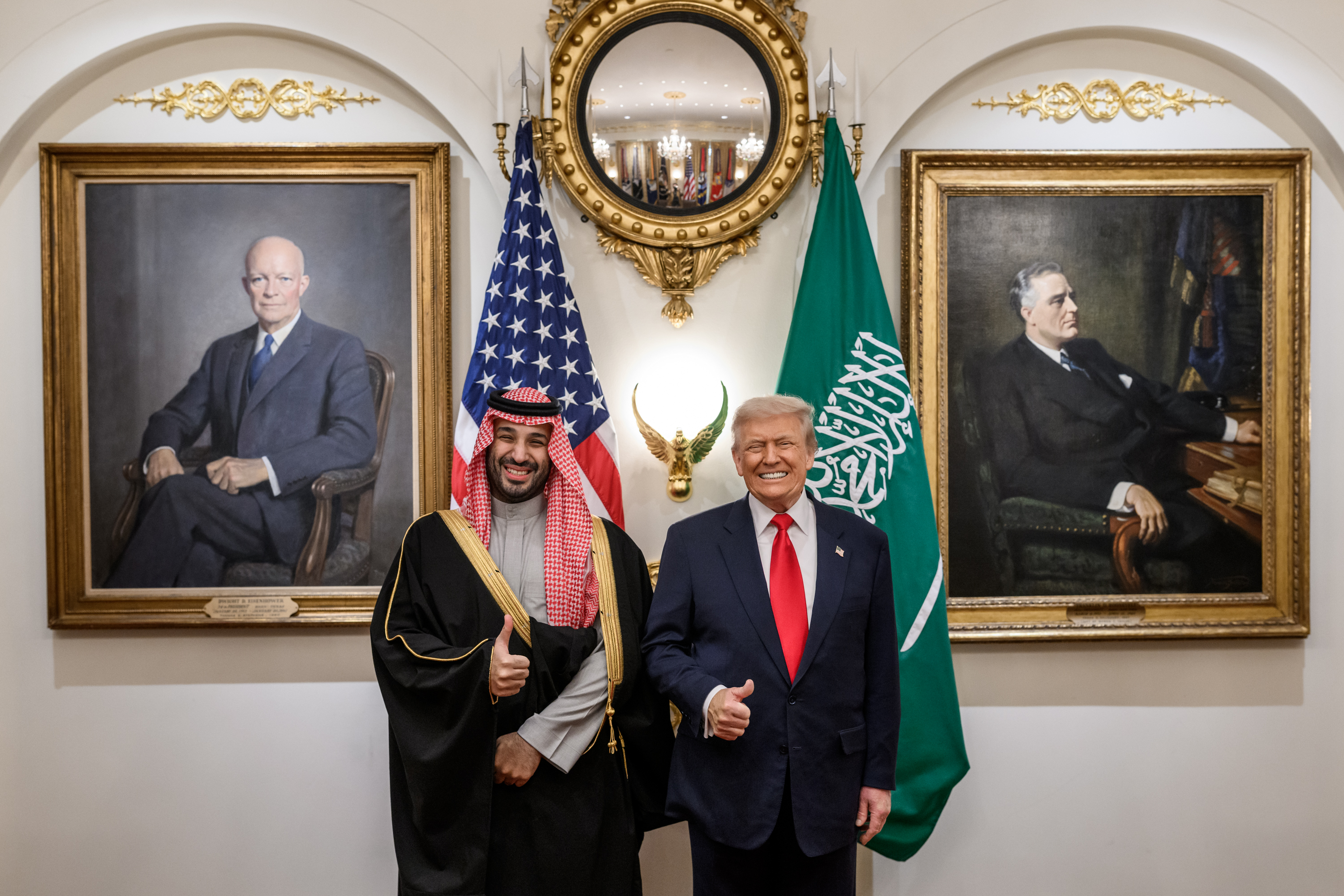
President Donald Trump and Crown Prince and Prime Minister Mohammed bin Salman of Saudi Arabia at the White House during the latter's visit to the U.S. on November 18, 2025, one month after the negotiations for the deal concluded in October 2025.

In July 2026, United States President Donald Trump approved an agreement with Saudi Arabia that will provide the kingdom with uranium enrichment capability for its civilian nuclear program. The deal will last 30 years and is also expected to involve U.S. firms in developing the program. The deal would allow for the building of a uranium enrichment facility in Saudi Arabia. The agreement does not include the IAEA's "Additional Protocol" which grants the U.N.'s International Atomic Energy Agency broad and more intrusive oversight of a country's nuclear activities, such as the power to carry out snap inspections at undeclared locations. The IAEA on July 23 stated that they were waiting for both countries to request verification for the implementation of the deal but were aware of their plan to ask the IAEA carry out the verification process by the agency.

On July 21, 2026, The Wall Street Journal reported that the United States and Saudi Arabia had agreed to a nuclear deal over Saudi Arabia's nuclear program, allowing the country to have a civilian nuclear program and allowing for nuclear enrichment. The deal does not include uranium enrichment according to Trump.

The deal does not include normalization between Israel and Saudi Arabia. At first, the Trump administration dropped the condition of the recognition of Israel by the Saudi's which was something that was pursued during the Biden administration as part of the formation of the nuclear deal.

Trump stated that for the deal to move forward with the U.S., Saudi Arabia must establish diplomatic relations with Israel as part of the Abraham Accords for which Trump had brokered normalization deals between Israel and the United Arab Emirates, Bahrain, Morocco, and Sudan in 2020 during his first term. According to Middle East Eye citing an unnamed source that normalization between Saudi Arabia and Israel was never discussed during the negotiations for the deal.

On August 24, 2026, the administration submitted the agreement to Congress to review. Trump formally issued his certification on July 16 to submit the treaty for congressional approval. In regards to both the IAEA protocols and the demand for Saudi Arabia to normalize relations with Israel, Chris Wright, during a press conference with Director General of the International Atomic Energy Agency Rafael Grossi on August 26, said that the agreement and the Abraham Accords negotiations "will be worked in parallel." But it remained unclear as to how the normalization requirement will be passed by Congress with the overall deal.

== Reactions ==
The deal has been met with both criticism and skepticism over the terms of the agreement and potential fallout of an arms race in the Middle East with the backdrop of the 2026 Iran war and its implementation.

The deal has been criticized by Democratic members of the U.S. Congress. Democratic Senator Ed Markey criticized the proposed deal in May saying that it was "selling out national security" because of the lack of sufficient safeguards. New York Congressman Gregory Meeks stated, "I'm very concerned. The timing seems funny. Seems as though it might be something that the Trump administration is doing to pay the Saudis to do something in the region." Virginia Senator Tim Kaine shared similar concerns that he was "pretty nervous" and the deal did not pass the standard set by the 2009 U.S.–UAE 123 Agreement for Peaceful Civilian Nuclear Energy Cooperation over IAEA oversight during the Obama administration.

Figures in American conservative media also criticized the deal over why the deal did not include normalization between Israel and Saudi Arabia. According to CNN, friction was caused in the administration as officials in the White House blamed Energy Department officials for unveiling the deal when they told them not to do so. White House spokesperson Taylor Rogers responded in a statement about the reported friction, "President Trump's energy team is fully aligned, and always has been: the civil nuclear deal being brokered between the United States and Saudi Arabia is contingent on Saudi Arabia joining the successful Abraham Accords, which will help bring true peace to the Middle East."

Nir Barkat, the Israeli minister of economy stated in a radio interview on July 22, "If they want it for peaceful purposes, for energy needs, we can manage it." Barkat was the only senior Israeli government official to comment on the deal. However, the deal has been criticized by former Israeli government officials and member of the opposition. Former primer minister Naftali Bennett said that "enriching nuclear material on Saudi territory could prompt a nuclear race in the region, leading to a total breakdown." Avigdor Lieberman stated, "Every military nuclear program begins with a civilian one" while calling for the Israeli government to lobby the U.S. Congress to strike down the agreement. Former Israeli ambassador to the U.S. Michael Herzog initially criticized the deal for not tying normalization between Israel and Saudi Arabia and a lack of guardrails to prevent the program from being converted for military purposes.

In response to concerns about the deal, United States Secretary of State Marco Rubio contended that the US was "not going to reach any agreement with any country in the world that leads to the risk of proliferation."

== See also ==
- Energy in Saudi Arabia
- Energy in the United States
- Energy policy of the United States
- Nuclear power in Saudi Arabia
- Saudi Arabia and weapons of mass destruction
- India–United States Civil Nuclear Agreement
- IP3 International
- Mecca Defence Alliance
