= Chaudhry Ali Akbar Khan =

Pakistani politician and diplomat

- چوہدری علی اکبر خان

Minister for Home and Kashmir Affairs
- In office 17 August 1965 – 30 November 1966
- President: Ayub Khan
- Preceded by: Ayub Khan
- Succeeded by: Afzal Rahman Khan

Ambassador of Pakistan to Saudi Arabia
- In office 1958–1962
- Preceded by: Khawaja Shahabuddin

Ambassador of Pakistan to Sudan
- In office 1957–1958

Minister for Education of Punjab
- In office 1953–1955

Personal details
- Born: 28 September 1910 Kolian, Hoshiarpur district, Punjab, British India (now Punjab, India)
- Died: 8 October 1967 (aged 57) Lyallpur, West Pakistan, Pakistan (now Punjab, Pakistan)
- Other political affiliations: All India Muslim League
- Spouse: Begum Ali Akbar Khan
- Children: Nisar Akbar Khan
- Occupation: Politician, diplomat

Chaudhry Ali Akbar Khan (Urdu/Punjabi: چوہدری علی اکبر خان; 28 September 1910 – 8 October 1967) was a Pakistani politician and diplomat. He was elected as a member of the Punjab Provincial Assembly in British India in 1946. A prominent Pakistan Movement activist, Khan went on to serve in the newly independent state of Pakistan as the provincial education minister of Punjab from 1953 to 1955 under chief minister Malik Feroz Khan Noon, and as the federal Minister for Home and Kashmir Affairs in the cabinet of president Ayub Khan from 1965 to 1966.

He was also appointed Pakistan's first ambassador to Sudan from 1957 to 1958, and as ambassador to Saudi Arabia from 1958 to 1962.

== Early life and education ==
Chaudhry Ali Akbar Khan was born on 28 September 1910 in the village of Kolian, located in the Dasuya subdivision of Hoshiarpur district in Punjab, British India. He belonged to a Rajput family. He graduated from the Government College in Lahore in 1931 and obtained a law degree from the Punjab University in 1935.

Khan started practicing as a lawyer in Dasuya before shifting to Hoshiarpur in pre-partition Punjab. Following the partition of British India in 1947, he moved with his family to the newly founded state of Pakistan, initially arriving in Lahore and then settling permanently in Lyallpur in 1949.

== Political career ==
Khan became associated with the Pakistan Movement during his student days and formally joined the All India Muslim League (AIML) in 1937. In 1944, he was nominated as a member of the Provincial Muslim League Working Committee and went on to serve as the president of the AIML's chapter in Hoshiarpur district, an appointment he held until the partition. He contested in the 1946 provincial general election from his constituency in Hoshiarpur district, and was elected as a member of the Punjab Provincial Assembly in British India.

Later, Khan was chosen by Muhammad Ali Jinnah as part of a three-member team to assist Sir Zafarullah Khan in presenting the case of the Muslim League before the Radcliffe Commission, which was constituted to demarcate the borders between India and Pakistan. After the independence of Pakistan, Khan became a member of the Constituent Assembly of Pakistan in 1950 and also served as secretary-general of the Provincial Muslim League Parliamentary Board.

In 1951, he contested in the provincial election and was elected to the Provincial Assembly of Punjab from Lyallpur. He was inducted in the cabinet of chief minister Malik Feroz Khan Noon in April 1953, serving as the Education Minister of Punjab until 1955. In addition, he was given the portfolios of jails, information, law, public relations and village-aid. During his tenure as minister for education, he helped establish several educational institutions including the Cadet College Hasan Abdal.

In 1953, Khan represented the government of Pakistan at the coronation of Elizabeth II. After returning from diplomatic assignments abroad in 1962, he contested in elections and was elected to the National Assembly of Pakistan from his constituency in Samundri in 1964. He was inducted in the cabinet of president Ayub Khan and served as the federal Minister for Home and Kashmir Affairs from 1965 to 1966. Khan's tenure coincided with the 1965 Indo-Pakistani War, during which he visited and discharged duties on the war front in Azad Kashmir.

== Diplomatic career ==
Khan was appointed Pakistan's first ambassador to Sudan from 1957 to 1958. He was also concurrently accredited to Ethiopia. In 1958, he was appointed the ambassador to Saudi Arabia, a post he held until 1962 with concurrent accreditation to Yemen and Somalia. As the envoy in Riyadh, he established the Pakistan Embassy School in Jeddah in 1959 to serve the children of Pakistani expatriates living in the kingdom.

== Death and legacy ==
Khan died on 8 October 1967 in his hometown, Lyallpur (now Faisalabad). In 2011, his family members established a social welfare and charitable organisation in his name, the Ali Akbar Khan Foundation. During the partition of Punjab in 1947, Khan was known to have played an instrumental role in the rehabilitation of migrants from East Punjab who arrived in Pakistan.

== Personal life ==
Khan was married to Begum Ali Akbar Khan. His son, Nisar Akbar Khan, served as a member of the National Assembly in 1977 and from 1988 to 1990. His son-in-law, Chaudhry Umar Daraz Khan, was elected as a member of the Punjab provincial assembly in 1977 and 1988.

Political offices
Preceded by Ayub Khan	Minister for Home and Kashmir Affairs; 1965–1966	Succeeded by Afzal Rahman Khan
