= Bilal Akbar =

Ambassador of Pakistan to Saudi Arabia

Lt Gen Bilal Akbar

Pakistan Ambassador to Saudi Arabia
- In office April 26, 2021 – 2021
- President: Arif Alvi
- Prime Minister: Imran Khan; Shehbaz Sharif
- Preceded by: Raja Ali Ejaz

Chairman Pakistan Ordnance Factory
- In office December 2016 – August 2018
- Preceded by: Gen Zubair Mahmood Hayat
- Succeeded by: Gen Nadeem Raza

Commander X Corps, Rawalpindi
- In office August 2018 – September 2019
- Preceded by: Gen Nadeem Raza
- Succeeded by: Lt Gen Sahir Shamshad Mirza

Chief of General Staff

Personal details
- Born: Bilal Akbar Sialkot

Military service
- Allegiance: Pakistan
- Branch/service: Pakistan Army
- Years of service: 1984–2020
- Rank: Lt. Gen.
- Unit: Pakistan Army Corps of Artillery
- Commands: *Colonel Commandant of Mujahid Force Regiment, Bhimber; X Corps, Rawalpindi; Chief of General Staff, GHQ; Chairman Pakistan Ordnance Factory; DG Pakistan Rangers, Sindh Rangers; GOC 11th Infantry Division, Lahore
- Battles/wars: War in Afghanistan (2001–present): War in North-West Pakistan; (Operation Zarb-e-Azb); Karachi Operation

Bilal Akbar (Urdu: بلال اکبر) is a retired three-star general of the Pakistan Army who later served as a Pakistan Ambassador to Saudi Arabia.

== Early life and education ==
General Bilal was admitted at the Pakistan Military Academy in 1984, and passed out from the academy with a class of 73rd PMA Long Course on 13 March 1986. He gained commission in the army as 2nd-Lt in the Artillery Corps. He is a graduate of the Command and Staff College in Quetta, the National Defense University in Islamabad, and the Turkish Staff College in Istanbul.

== Military career ==
=== Early command roles ===
In 2013–14, Major-General Bilal Akbar served as the GOC of the 11th Division stationed in Lahore.

=== Director-General, Sindh Rangers (2014–2016) ===
In August 2014, Major General Bilal Akbar was transferred and took charge as the Director-General of the Sindh Rangers. Under his command, the Sindh Rangers decreased the rate of crime in Karachi and apprehended those in charge of organised crime within Karachi. Due to numerous successful operations under his command, Karachi had started its recovery to stability, and becoming a contributing part of Pakistan. Notably Karachi's crime rate which enlisted the city among top ten dangerous cities of the world till 2013 improved its ranking and recorded its crime rat fell lower than Chicago and Delhi in 2017. Moreover, Bilal also successfully curbed the political gang-wars undertaken by the political armed wings of the different political parties. Over 2000 target killers were arrested or either killed in different Intelligence-Based Operations undertaken by the Sindh Rangers which was considered to be a major success of urban warfare tactics employed by the Bilal Akbar.

=== Promotions and senior roles ===
On 11 December 2016, Maj-Gen. Akbar was promoted to the three-star rank and appointed as the Chief of General Staff at the Army GHQ in Rawalpindi. On 24 August 2018, Lt Gen Bilal Akbar was then posted as the field commander of the X Corps stationed in Rawalpindi as a result of a major command reshuffle.

On 28 December 2018, Lt Gen Bilal Akbar was appointed as Colonel commandant of the Mujahid Force Regiment stationed in Bhimber. On 12 September 2019, Lt Gen Akbar was appointed as Chairman Pakistan Ordnance Factory.

== Post-military career ==
In January 2021, Akbar was appointed Pakistan's ambassador to Saudi Arabia after his retirement from the Army in December 2020.
