= List of military installations in Saudi Arabia =

This is a list of military installations in Saudi Arabia.

== Joint ==
- King Khalid Military City

== Air Force ==
- King Abdulaziz Air Base
- King Abdullah Air Base
- King Faisal Air Base
- King Fahad Air Base
- King Salman Air Base
- King Saud Air Base
- Prince Sultan Air Base
- Hail Air base
- King Khalid Air Base

== Medical ==
- King Abdulaziz Medical City
- Riyadh Military Hospital

== Navy ==
- King Abdulaziz Naval Base
- King Faisal Naval Base

== Strategic ==
- Al Sulayyil ballistic missile base
- Al-Watah ballistic missile base

== Foreign forces ==
- Eskan Village Air Force Base in Riyadh

== See also ==
- Lists of military installations
