= Nadeem Raza =

17th Chairman Joint Chiefs of Staff Committee

Nadeem Raza NI(M) HI(M)
- ندیم رضا
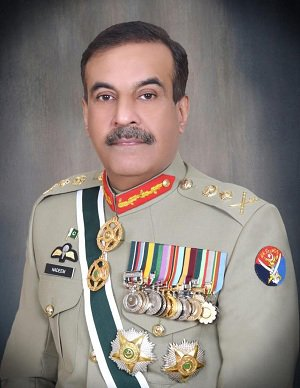

17th Chairman Joint Chiefs of Staff Committee
- In office 27 November 2019 – 27 November 2022
- President: Arif Alvi
- Preceded by: Zubair Mahmood Hayat
- Succeeded by: Sahir Shamshad Mirza

Chief of General Staff
- In office September 2018 – November 2019
- Preceded by: Lt Gen Bilal Akbar
- Succeeded by: Lt Gen Sahir Shamshad Mirza

Commander X Corps, Rawalpindi
- In office December 2016 – September 2018
- Preceded by: Lt Gen Malik Zafar Iqbal
- Succeeded by: Lt Gen Bilal Akbar

Commandant of Pakistan Military Academy
- In office October 2014 – December 2016

Personal details
- Born: June 23, 1965 (age 61) Wah Cantonment, Punjab Pakistan
- Height: 1.75 m (5 ft 9 in)
- Spouse: Syeda Bushra Raza
- Children: 4
- Awards: Nishan-e-Imtiaz (Military); Hilal-e-Imtiaz (Military); Turkish Legion of Merit; Grand Officer of the Order of Military Merit of Brazil; Order of Military Merit; Order of Bahrain

Military service
- Allegiance: Pakistan
- Branch/service: Pakistan Army
- Years of service: 1981–2022
- Rank: General
- Unit: 10 Sind Regiment
- Commands: Chief of General Staff; Corps Commander X Corps; Commandant PMA; GOC 9th Infantry Division

Nadeem Raza NI(M), HI(M) (Urdu: ندیم رضا) is a retired four-star army general of the Pakistan Army who got commissioned in 10 Sind Regiment in September 1985. He served as the 17th Chairman Joint Chiefs of Staff Committee. Raza was previously the Corps Commander of the X Corps (Pakistan) and CGS (Chief of General Staff) and GOC (General Officer Commanding) 9th Infantry Division, Wana and Commandant of the Pakistan Military Academy, Kakul, Abbottabad.

== Personal life and education ==
Raza was born on 23 June 1965 in a Syed Family in Wah Cantonment. His late father Syed Mehdi Hussain migrated from Lucknow, India to Wah Cantonment and worked at the Pakistan Ordnance Factory Wah Cantonment. His two elder brothers also served in the Pakistani military, retiring as a lieutenant colonel and a squadron leader, respectively. Raza excelled academically, and graduated in 1981 from Sir Syed High School Wah Cantonment. He later joined the Pakistan Military Academy through 72nd PMA LC as a Gentleman Cadet. In 1994, he attended the Infantry Company Command Course in Germany. He is a graduate of Command and Staff College, Quetta and National Defence University, Islamabad.

Raza is married to Syeda Bushra Raza, with whom he has four children: Zain, Mahad, Hania, and Sajeel.

== Career ==
In September 1985, Raza was commissioned in the infantry's 10 Sind Regiment.

Nadeem Raza has served on the faculty of the School of Infantry and Tactics, Quetta, Command and Staff College, Quetta, National Defence University, Islamabad.

He also served as Chief of Staff of I Corps (Pakistan) and Brigade Commander of 2 AK Brigade situated at Rawalakot. He Commanded 2 AK Brigade from June 2009 – 2011.

In July 2013, Raza was promoted to the rank of Major General and took charge as the GOC (General Officer Commanding) of the 9th Infantry Division situated then in Kohat and Wana (South Waziristan). In Oct 2014, Gen Raza was posted as the 35th Commandant of the Pakistan Military Academy.

In December 2016, Raza was promoted to the rank of three star, Lt Gen from Maj Gen while he was serving as the Commandant of Pakistan Military Academy. Lt Gen Nadeem Raza commanded the largest Corp of Pakistan Army, the X Corps based in Rawalpindi.

In October 2017, Raza was appointed as 1st Colonel Commandant of the Mujahid Force.

In August 2018, Nadeem Raza was appointed as the CGS (Chief of General Staff), Which is the most important appointment of the Pakistan Army after the COAS (Chief of Army Staff). He assumed the position on 10 September 2018.

In November 2019, Nadeem Raza curbed all the competition for the post of CJCSC and was promoted to four-star rank and appointed as the 17th Chairman Joint Chiefs of Staff Committee of the Pakistan Armed Forces. He assumed the coveted position on 27 November 2019.

In July 2022, Raza was admitted to the Order of Military Merit by the Brazilian president Jair Bolsonaro.

== Awards and decorations ==

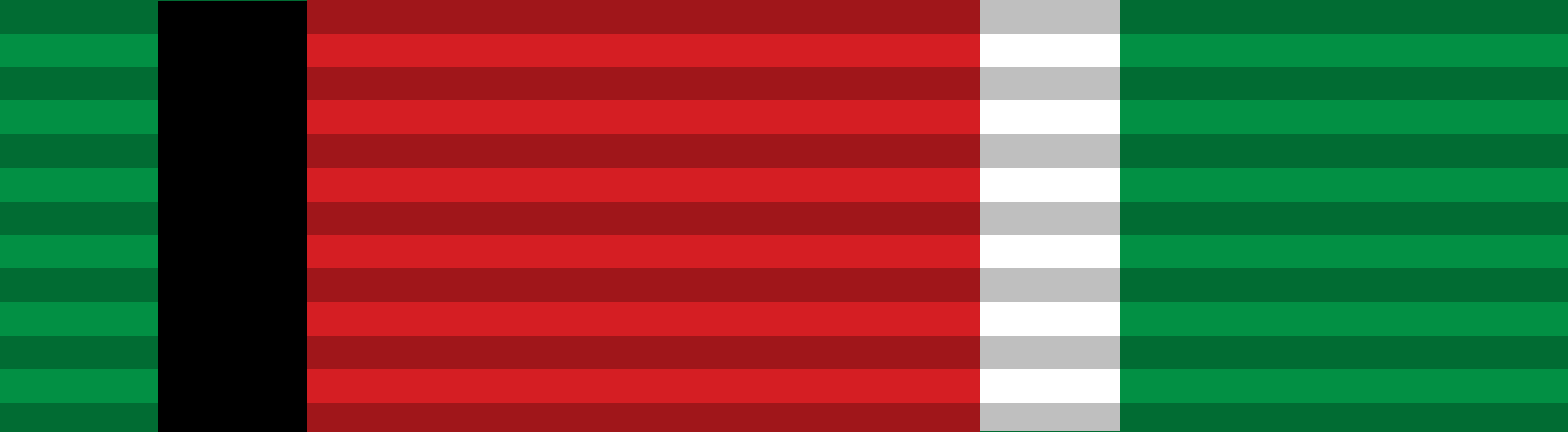

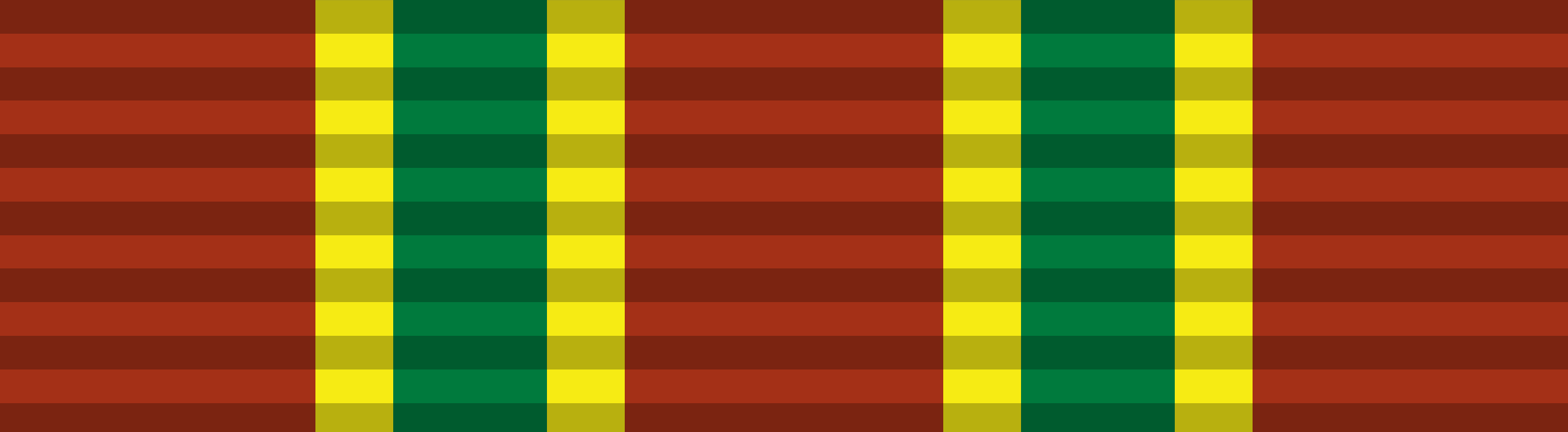

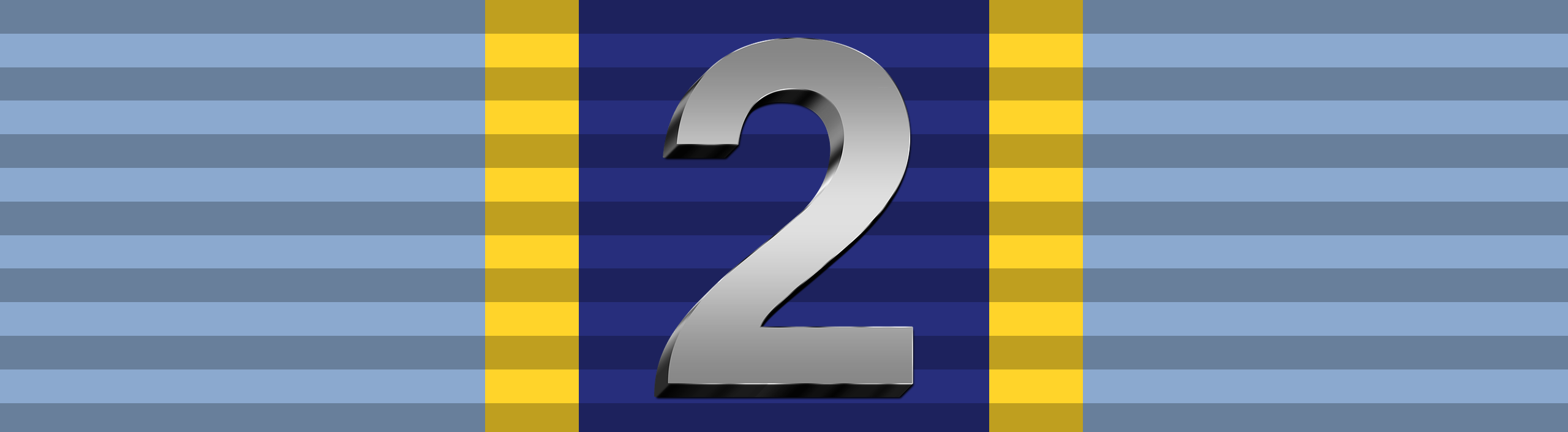

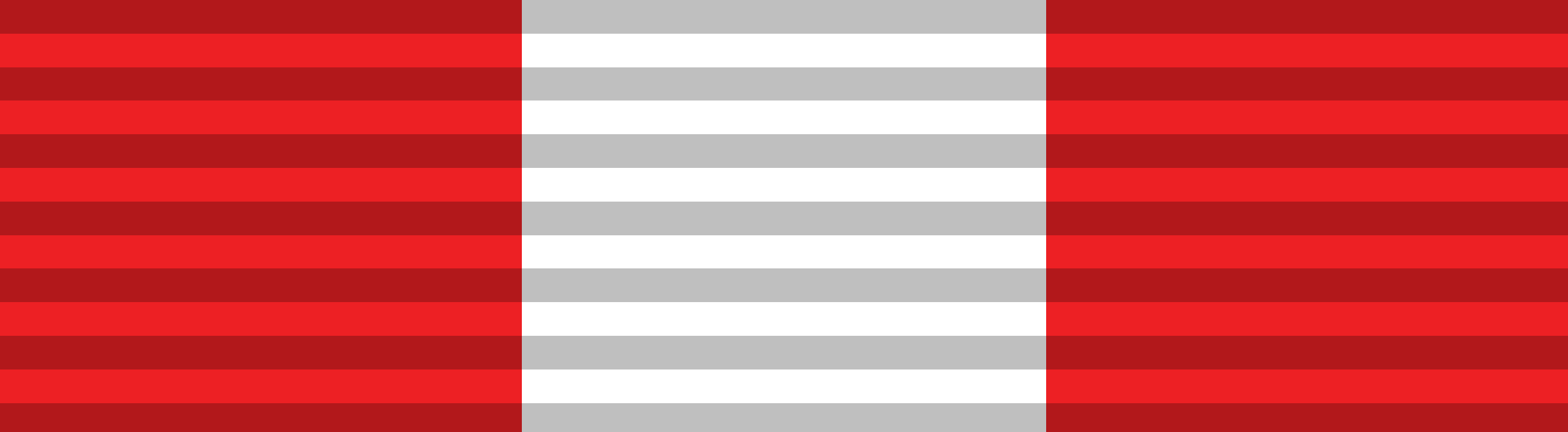

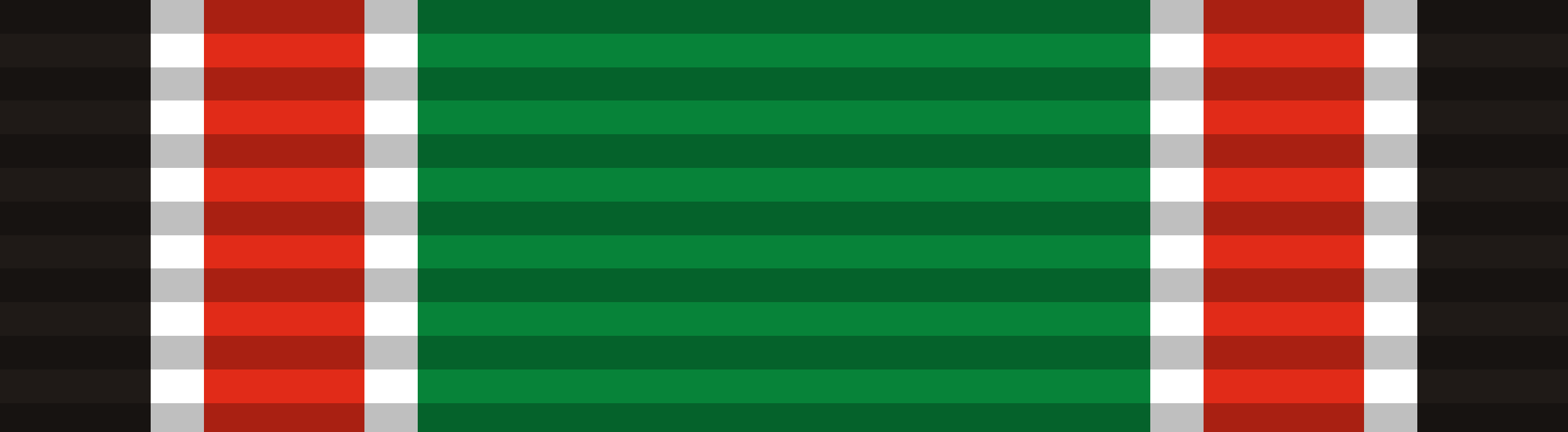

Nishan-e-Imtiaz (Military) (Order of Excellence)		Hilal-e-Imtiaz (Military) (Crescent of Excellence)	
Tamgha-e-Diffa (General Service Medal) Siachen Glacier Clasp	Tamgha-e-Baqa (Nuclear Test Medal) 1998	Tamgha-e-Istaqlal Pakistan (Escalation with India Medal) 2002	Tamgha-e-Azm (Medal of Conviction) (2018)
10 Years Service Medal	20 Years Service Medal	30 Years Service Medal	35 Years Service Medal
Jamhuriat Tamgha (Democracy Medal) 1988	Qarardad-e-Pakistan Tamgha (Resolution Day Golden Jubilee Medal) 1990	Tamgha-e-Salgirah Pakistan (Independence Day Golden Jubilee Medal) 1997	Command and Staff College Quetta Centenary Instructor's Medal 2007
Nuth al-Markat (Combat Medal) Saudi Arabia (Gulf War 1991)	United Nations MONUC Medal (2 Deployments)	Turkish Legion of Merit (Turkey)	The Order of Military Merit (Grand Cordon) (Jordan)

=== Foreign decorations ===
Foreign Awards
Saudi Arabia	Nuth al-Markat (Combat Medal) (Gulf War 1991)
United Nations	UN MONUC (Congo) Medal
Turkey	Turkish Legion of Merit
Jordan	The Order of Military Merit (Grand Cordon)
Brazil	Order of Military Merit (Grand Officer)

== Effective dates of promotion ==
Insignia	Rank	Date
	General CJCSC	November 2019
	Lieutenant General	December 2016
	Major General	August 2013
	Brigadier	June 2006
	Lieutenant Colonel	November 1999
	Major	April 1993
	Captain	April 1988
	Lieutenant	October 1986
	Second Lieutenant	September 1985

Military offices
Preceded by Zubair Mahmood Hayat	Chairman Joint Chiefs of Staff Committee; 2019 - present	Incumbent
