= A. R. Khan =

Former Pakistani Naval Chief

A. R. Khan HPk HJ HQA
- اے آر خان
- Official Military portrait, 1966

Minister of Defence
- In office 12 October 1966 – 5 April 1969
- President: Ayub Khan
- Preceded by: Ayub Khan
- Succeeded by: General Yahya Khan

Minister of Interior
- In office 5 December 1966 – 25 March 1969
- Preceded by: Chaudhry Ali Akbar Khan
- Succeeded by: General Abdul Hamid Khan

3rd Commander-in-Chief Pakistan Navy
- In office 1 March 1959 – 20 October 1966
- Preceded by: V/Adm HMS Choudri
- Succeeded by: V/Adm S. M. Ahsan

Personal details
- Born: Afzal Rahman Khan; 20 March 1921 Kala Afgana, Punjab Province (British India)
- Died: 27 June 1983 (aged 62) Karachi, Pakistan
- Children: 3
- Education: Government College, Lahore; Staff College, Quetta; Joint Services Staff College (UK)

Military service
- Branch/service: Royal Indian Navy (1940–1947); Pakistan Navy (1947–1966)
- Years of service: 1940–1969
- Rank: Vice Admiral
- Unit: Naval Executive Branch
- Commands: PNS Tariq; PNS Tippu Sultan
- Battles/wars: World War II; Indo-Pakistani War of 1965; Operation Dwarka
- Awards: Hilal-e-Pakistan; Hilal-e-Jurat; Hilal-e-Quaid-e-Azam

Afzal Rahman Khan (Note: Urdu: افضل رحمان خان) (20 March 1921 – 27 June 1983) better known as A. R. Khan, was a Pakistani former three-star rank naval officer who served as the third Commander-in-Chief of the Pakistan Navy from 1959 until 1966. He is noted for being the longest serving chief and was responsible for launching the submarine program in the navy.

After his service in the navy, he served in President Ayub Khan's administration simultaneously as Interior Minister and Defence Minister. He left office shortly after General Yahya Khan succeeded Ayub Khan as President.

Commissioned in the Royal Indian Navy in 1940, Khan earned notability and prestige when he commanded the Pakistan Navy against Indian Navy during the Indo-Pakistani War of 1965.

== Early life and education ==
Afzal Rahman Khan was born into a Pashtun family of agriculturalists in the village of Kala Afgana in the Gurdaspur District on 21 March 1921. His parents were Abdur Rahman Khan and Aziz Bibi Khan.

He received his early education in his village and was later educated at Baring High School, Batala, and Government College, Lahore.

== Personal life ==
He married Hameeda in 1944 and they had three children, one son and two daughters.

== Service years ==
=== Royal Indian Navy (1940-1947) ===
He gained commission as a Midshipman in the Royal Indian Navy in 1940. He was also trained in naval artillery at HMS EXCELLENT in the United Kingdom and participated in World War II on behalf of Great Britain.

He studied at the Staff College, Quetta from December 1945 to April 1946 and graduated with a staff course degree. During this time, he was contemporary to Gopal Gurunath Bewoor (Indian Army), Iqbal Khan and Abdul Hamid Khan– all became generals in Indian and Pakistan Army. He provided his gunnery services to HMS Duke of York at the time of the partition of British India and decided to opted for Pakistan in 1947.

=== Pakistan Navy (1947-1966) ===
He did not participate in first war with India in 1947, instead he commanded a destroyer from Karachi to Mumbai to oversee the evacuation of Indian emigrants to Pakistan. He was among the first twenty naval officers who joined the Royal Pakistan Navy (RPN) as a Lieutenant with a service number PN. 0006. He was the third most senior Lieutenant in the navy in terms of seniority list provided by the Royal Indian Navy to the Ministry of Defense (MoD) in 1947.

In 1949, he was promoted as Lieutenant-Commander and served as commanding officer of PNS Tariq, the first destroyer, when it was commissioned from the Royal Navy on 30 September 1949. In 1950, he was promoted as Commander and commanded the Tippu Sultan and sailed on a goodwill mission to Middle East and Eastern Europe; he visited Jeddah, Malta, Venice, Athens, Istanbul, İzmir and Crete.

In 1951, he participated in Task Force 91 that was held in Trincomalee Sri Lanka with the Royal Navy. His career progressed well in the navy and helped establish the Naval Intelligence (NI) and helped establish naval bases in Karachi.

In 1958–59, the Naval NHQ staff had been in a brief conflict with the Ministry of Defence over the rearmament issues which eventually led the resignation of Vice-Admiral HMS Choudrie. Rear Admiral A. R. Khan took command of the navy on 1 March 1959 and was promoted to Vice Admiral on 26 December 1961.

He earned public notability when he acted as a leader during the war with India in 1965 despite having prior no knowledge on covert operation in Indian Kashmir. He oversaw the planning of and execution of the naval operation to attack the Indian Navy which earned him the prestige in the country. After the war, he was publicly honored and was decorated with Hilal-i-Jurat by President Ayub Khan.

In August 1965, Admiral A. R. Khan succeeded Air Marshal Asghar Khan as Pakistan's Military Adviser to SEATO.

About the uprising and riots in East-Pakistan in 1969, Vice-Admiral A. R. Khan told the journalists that the "country was under the Mob rule and that Police were not strong enough to tackle the situation." He served in ministerial post until 1969 when President Ayub Khan resigned and handed over the presidency to his Army Commander-in-Chief General Yahya Khan who suspended the Constitution. In protest to the martial law, Vice-Admiral A.R. Khan resigned from his portfolio on 25 March 1969.

After his resignation, Khan moved to Islamabad and lived a quiet life.

He died in Karachi on 27 June 1983.

== Notes ==
Military offices
| Preceded by HMS Choudri | Commander-in-Chief, Pakistan Navy; 1959–1966 | Succeeded by S. M. Ahsan |
Political offices
| Preceded by Chaudhry Ali Akbar Khan | Interior Minister of Pakistan; 1966–1969 | Succeeded by Abdul Hamid Khan |
| Preceded by Ayub Khan | Defence Minister of Pakistan; 1966–1969 | Succeeded by Yahya Khan |
