= National Guard (Pakistan) =

Pakistani paramilitary force

- پاسبانِ قومی پاکستان
- Founded: 3 January 1948
- Country: Pakistan
- Type: Reserve force Militia
- Role: law enforcement, first responders
- Size: ~185,000
- Part of: Pakistan Army
- Garrison/HQ: Army GHQ, Rawalpindi
- Engagements: Indo-Pakistani wars and conflicts: Indo-Pakistani War of 1947; Indo-Pakistani War of 1965; Indo-Pakistani War of 1971; Kargil War

Commanders
- Chief of Army Staff: General Syed Asim Munir Ahmad Shah
- Director-General, National Guards: Maj-Gen. Tariq Mahmood
- Notable commanders: Brig. Shahid Hamid; Maj-Gen. Akbar Khan

The National Guard (Urdu: قومی پاکستان) is a military reserve force of Pakistan and a component of the Pakistan Army, designed to act as a "second line of defence", together with the Pakistan Army Reserve and the paramilitary Civil Armed Forces.

== History ==
The National Guard was established on 1 January 1948 as a reserve component of the Pakistan Army, first advertised as a volunteer corps later expanded with a Women's Guard. Prime Minister Liaquat Ali Khan appointed Brigadier Syed Shahid Hamid as its first chief, and later delegated the command to Major-General Akbar Khan.

== Organization ==
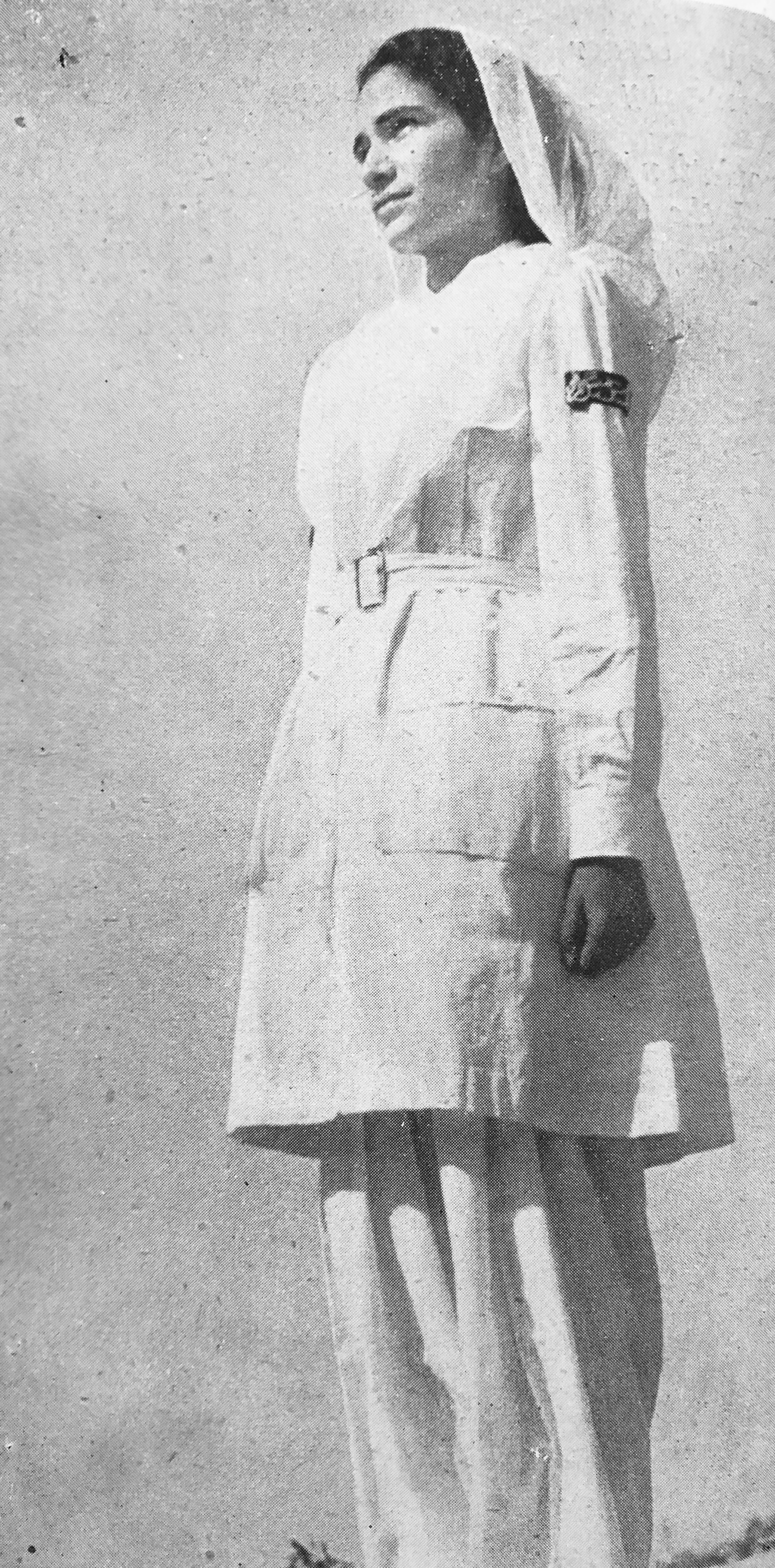
A member of the Women's Guard in 1950.

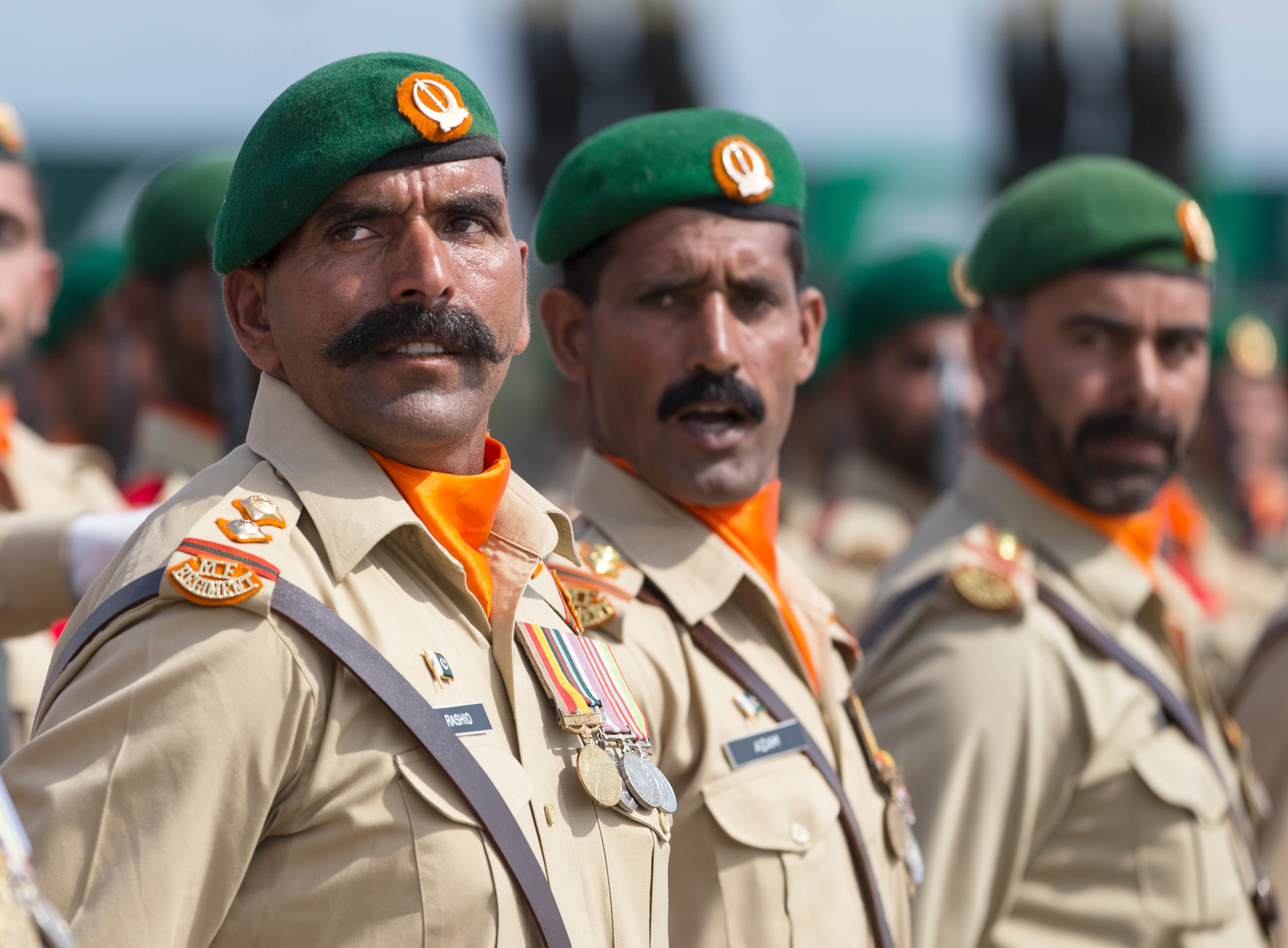
Members of the Mujahid Force on parade.

The command and control of the National Guard is under the Chief of Army Staff, who serves as the Principal Officer Commanding from Army GHQ in Rawalpindi.

The National Guard was initially authorised by the "Pakistan National Guard Ordinance, 1947" on 2 November 1947, and was initially composed of infantry on 7-year contracts. It was expanded in 1972 in the aftermath of the secession of Bangladesh. It is currently composed of two forces:

- The Mujahid Force, a paramilitary regiment of numerous battalions, which supports and supplements the regular Army during national emergencies and war.
- The Janbaz Force, which operates air defence batteries and infantry companies under the control of the provincial governments, and its members tend to serve close to their home districts.

The two current components are recruited, trained and deployed in their local areas, and are mainly charged with air defence and helping with national emergencies.

Previously, the National Guard also included two other forces:

- National Cadet Corps (dissolved in 2002)
- Women's Guard (formed in 1948) (dissolved)

The National Cadet Corps, was similar to the British Officers' Training Corps. The National Cadet Corps was disbanded in 2002 by President Pervez Musharraf, although there were calls for the Corps to be restored at a federal level in 2015, and at provincial level in 2019.

The Women's Guard was formed at the behest of Ra'ana Liaquat Ali Khan, wife of the first Prime Minister of Pakistan. The Guard included individuals trained in nursing, welfare, and clerical work. There were also some women in the Janbaz Force, and a very small number of women were recruited into regular service to perform medical and educational work.

== See also ==
- Civil Armed Forces, a group of nine paramilitary, uniformed organisations in Pakistan, separate and distinct from the "military" Armed Forces.
- Muslim League National Guard, a former paramilitary organisation associated with the Pakistan Movement.
