= National Cadet Corps (Pakistan) =

Pakistani paramilitary unit

- Founded: c. 1948
- Disbanded: 2002
- Country: Pakistan
- Type: Paramilitary; Youth organisation
- Part of: National Guard

The National Cadet Corps (NCC) was a college and school-based programme for providing military-style training to students in Pakistan, under the auspices of the Pakistan Army. It was a component of the National Guard (a reserve force of the Pakistan Army), and was similar to the British Officers' Training Corps and Army Cadet Force.

== History ==
The Government of Pakistan formed a committee to prepare the groundwork for establishing a National Cadet Corps in 1947. The government confirmed an intention to raise the Corps in September 1950. The aim was to organise college battalions composed of students, with college staff holding officer positions. Initially it operated only in West Pakistan but by 1952 it was being considered for expansion to East Pakistan, and had formed junior and senior sections, although a women’s section was not formed.

By 1960 the intention was for the Corps to have a strength of 20,000 members. A 1960 commission on education, set up by the government, recommended creating an Army-controlled directorate to organise the Corps more effectively. It also recommended separate sections men’s and women’s sections for each of the three military services. Although the 1962 East Pakistan Annual indicated that funding had been made available for a Corps there, it is unclear whether the proposed expansion to East Pakistan was implemented because a national budget for 1964 referred to the "West Pakistan National Cadet Corps Scheme".

It was officially merged into the National Guard when that force was expanded in 1972 in response to the secession of East Pakistan as the independent country of Bangladesh in 1971. The recruitment criteria in 1973 were for male college students and staff in good health, who would be subject to military law while they were part of the Corps. The training included annual military-style camps and one of the benefits of successfully completing the training was preferential treatment for government jobs. By 1977 the Corps was operational in most degree colleges in the country.

The Corps was disbanded in 2002 by President Pervez Musharraf, although the government was reportedly considering restarting it in the aftermath of the 2014 Peshawar school massacre. There were calls for the Corps to be restored at a federal level in 2015, and at provincial level in 2019.

== See also ==
- List of cadet colleges in Pakistan
- National Cadet Corps (India)
- Officers Training Corps
