= Energy in Saudi Arabia =

Development of carbon dioxide emissions

Energy consumption by source, Saudi Arabia

Energy in Saudi Arabia involves petroleum and natural gas production, consumption, and exports, and electricity production. Saudi Arabia is the world's leading oil producer and exporter. Saudi Arabia's economy is petroleum-based; oil accounts for 90% of the country's exports and nearly 75% of government revenue. The oil industry produces about 45% of Saudi Arabia's gross domestic product, against 40% from the private sector. Saudi Arabia has per capita GDP of $20,700. The economy is still very dependent on oil despite diversification, in particular in the petrochemical sector.

For many years the Kingdom of Saudi Arabia has been the world's largest petroleum producer and exporter. In 2011 it pumped about 1.7142 million m^{3} (10.782 million bbl) per day of petroleum. While most of this is exported, domestic use is rapidly increasing, primarily for electricity production. Saudi Arabia also has the largest, or one of the largest, proven crude oil reserves (i.e. oil that is economically recoverable) in the world (18% of global reserves, over 41 billion m^{3} (260 billion bbl)).

Saudi Arabia has one of the largest reserves of natural gas in the Persian Gulf. Proven natural gas reserves are over 7 trillion m^{3} (44 trillion bbl). Global production in 2009 reached 4.6 billion m^{3} (29 billion bbl) of oil and 3 trillion cubic metres (110 trillion cubic feet) of natural gas. but due to its sizeable domestic gas markets, is "unlikely to become LNG exporters anytime soon". Saudi Arabia is prioritising upstream gas investment, but for use in the domestic power generation market, not for export.

The country has had plans to diversify its energy sources for some time, developing solar and nuclear power.

Energy in Saudi Arabia
	Capita	Prim. energy	Production	Export	Electricity	CO_{2}-emission
	Million	TWh	TWh	TWh	TWh	Mt
2004	24.0	1,633	6,469	4,811	148	324
2007	24.2	1,748	6,412	4,606	175	358
2008	24.7	1,879	6,734	4,796	187	389
2009	25.4	1,836	6,145	4,324	199	410
2010	27.45	1,969	6,258	4,551	219	446
2012	28.08	2,176	6,998	4,700	227	457
2012R	28.29	2,329	7,269	4,949	248	459
2013	28.83	2,235	7,146	4,882	264	472
Change 2004–2010	15%	21%	-3%	-5%	48%	37%
Mtoe (million tonnes of oil equivalent) = 11.63 TWh (terawatt-hours). Primary energy includes energy losses. 2012R: CO2 calculation criteria changed; numbers updated.

== Petroleum ==
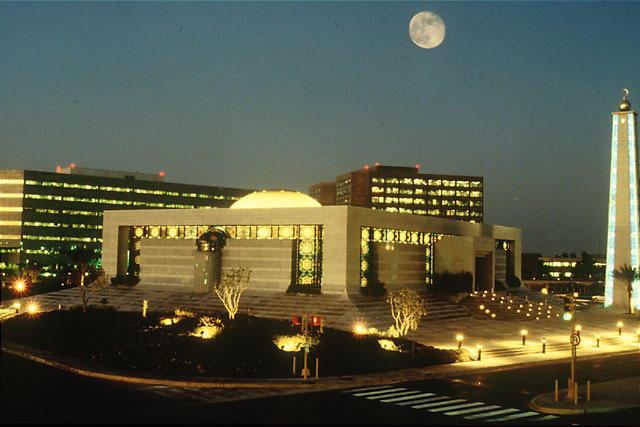
Saudi Aramco's Core Area in Dhahran

=== Reserves ===
According to OPEC, Saudi Arabia possesses around 17% of the world's proven petroleum reserves. Apart from petroleum, the Kingdom's other natural resources include natural gas, iron ore, gold, and copper.

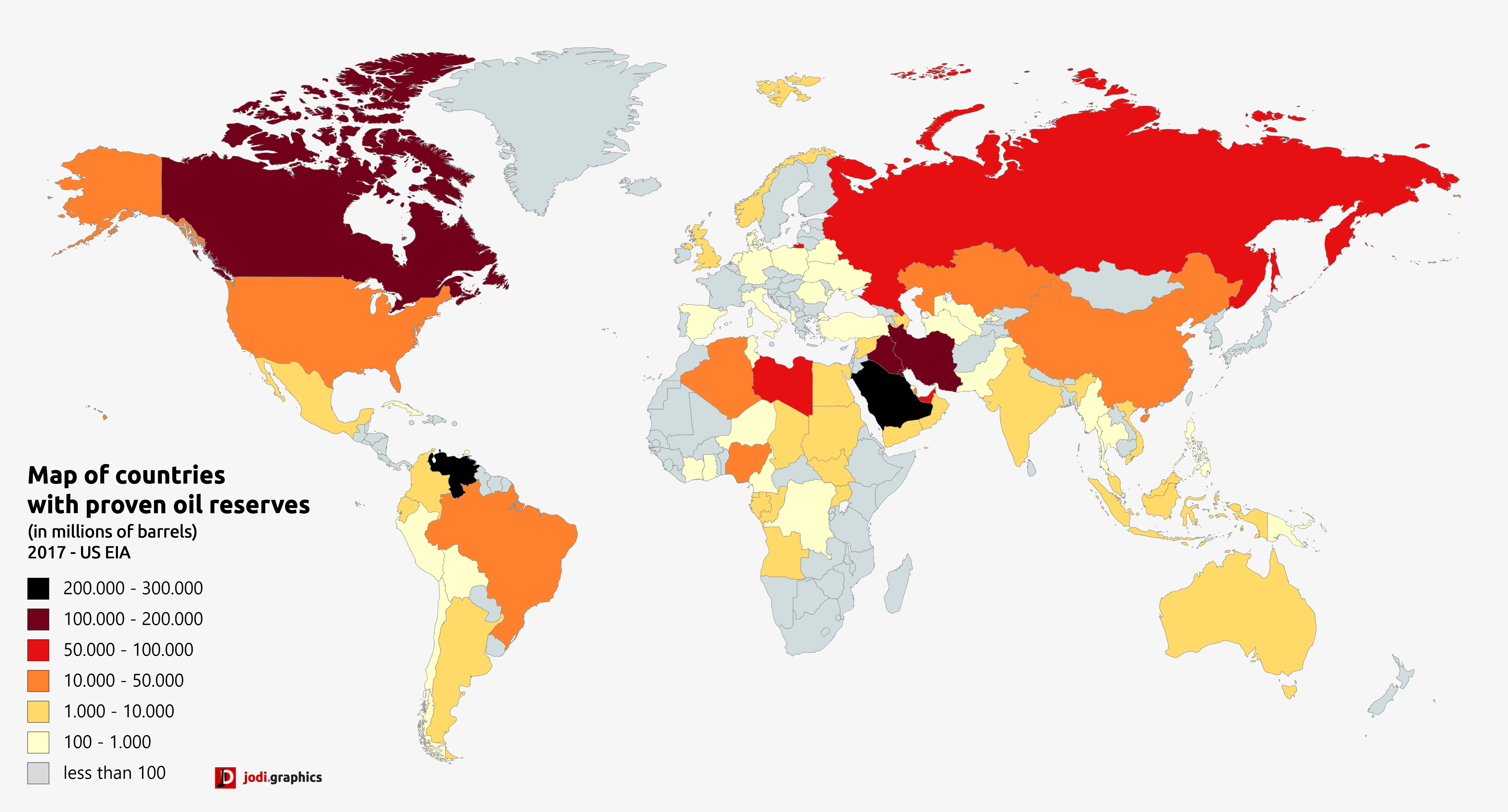
A map of world oil reserves according to U.S. EIA, 2017

In January 2007, Saudi Aramco's proven reserves were estimated at 41.3 billion m^{3} (259.9 billion bbl), comprising about 24% of the world total. They would last for 90 years at the current rate of production. 85% of Saudi oil fields found have not been extracted yet.

The Ghawar oil field is the largest oil field in the world, holding over 11 billion m^{3} (70 billion bbl). Ghawar is able to produce 800,000 m^{3} (5 million bbl) per day of oil. Aramco announced 16,000 m^{3} (100,000 bbl) per day expansion and integration with neighboring petrochemical plants in Ras Tanura and Yanbu by 2010 to 2012.

However, according to journalist Karen Elliott House, "some energy experts are convinced that current reserves are substantially lower than those officially claimed by Saudis and that the depletion rate is substantially faster." According to a former senior executive of the state-run Aramco oil company Sadad Ibrahim Al Husseini the country's real oil reserves are 40% lower than the official estimate of 716 billion barrels of oil. House states, "no convincing evidence ever has been provided to support the increase [in Saudi oil reserves]. And tellingly, in 1982 the kingdom and other OPEC oil producers ceased releasing production data by field. ... Finally, Saudi Arabia has not revised its reserve estimate since 1988, even though it has pumped somewhere between 0.8 and 1 million m^{3} (5 and 9 million bbl) a day for the intervening two decades, for a total of nearly 7.9 billion m^{3} (50 billion bbl)."

==== New oil fields ====
New oil fields will add up to 570,000 m^{3} (3.6 million bbl) per day to production capacity by 2011. The new fields are Haradh, Khurais, Khusaniyah, Manifa, Neutral Zone (shared with Kuwait), Nuayyin and Shaybah I II & III.

=== Production ===
Saudi Arabia is the major oil producer in the world accounting for 12.9% of the global production.

Saudi Arabia produces over 1.6 million m^{3} (10 million bbl) per day of oil, exporting 1.4 million m^{3} (8.9 million bbl) per day. The government is investing over $71 billion to increase oil production to near 1.9 million m^{3} (12 million bbl) per day by 2009 and up to 2.0 million m^{3} (12.5 million bbl) per day by 2015. This may be attributed to the report that 110 thousand m^{3} (700 thousand bbl) of excess capacity are needed to compensate for a natural decline in availability.

The future of Saudi Arabian oil is complicated by the fact that the major Saudi oil fields are extremely old and have been producing oil for decades. Corrosion is becoming a large problem in addition to many other problems that come over time. The result is that most of the easily produced oil is gone from these fields and tapping the rest of the oil is probably going to be much more difficult and more expensive. Such increased difficulty and expense may indicate that Saudi Arabian oil fields have already peaked.

On 26 May, 2025 Saudi Arabia and Kuwait have announced a major oil discovery in the Partitioned Zone, near the North Wafra Wara-Burgan field, about five kilometers from the Wafra field. The well produced over 500 barrels per day of crude with an API gravity of 26–27 degrees. It’s the first find since joint operations resumed in 2020, highlighting the countries' continued energy cooperation and commitment to global supply security.

=== Shipping ===
The majority of the oil is shipped via supertankers to refineries around the world. Three major ports are used for the shipping. Ras Tanura is the world's largest offshore oil loading facility with 6 million barrels per day (950×10^{3} m^{3}/d) capacity. The Ras al-Ju'aymah facility, on the coast of the Persian Gulf, loads nearly 75% of the exports. The last of the three largest terminals is the Yanbu terminal located on the Red Sea. The enormous sea shipping capacity is vital to Saudi Arabia given the absence of international pipelines.

=== Export ===
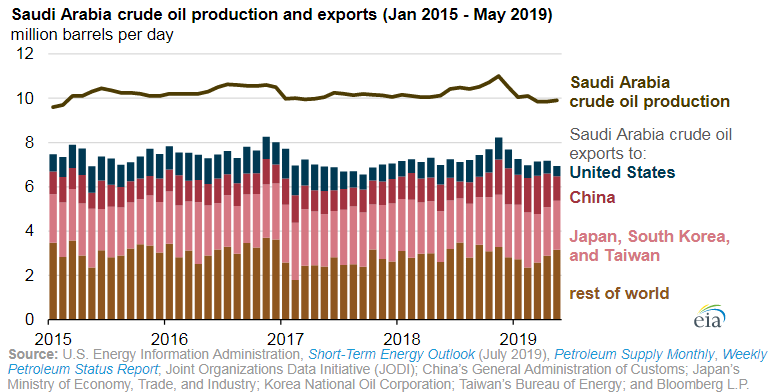
Saudi crude oil exports by destination, 2015–2019

For many years Saudi's ability to increase production of oil and stabilize price spikes led it to be compared to an international central bank and be called a "central bank of oil'.

=== Consumption ===
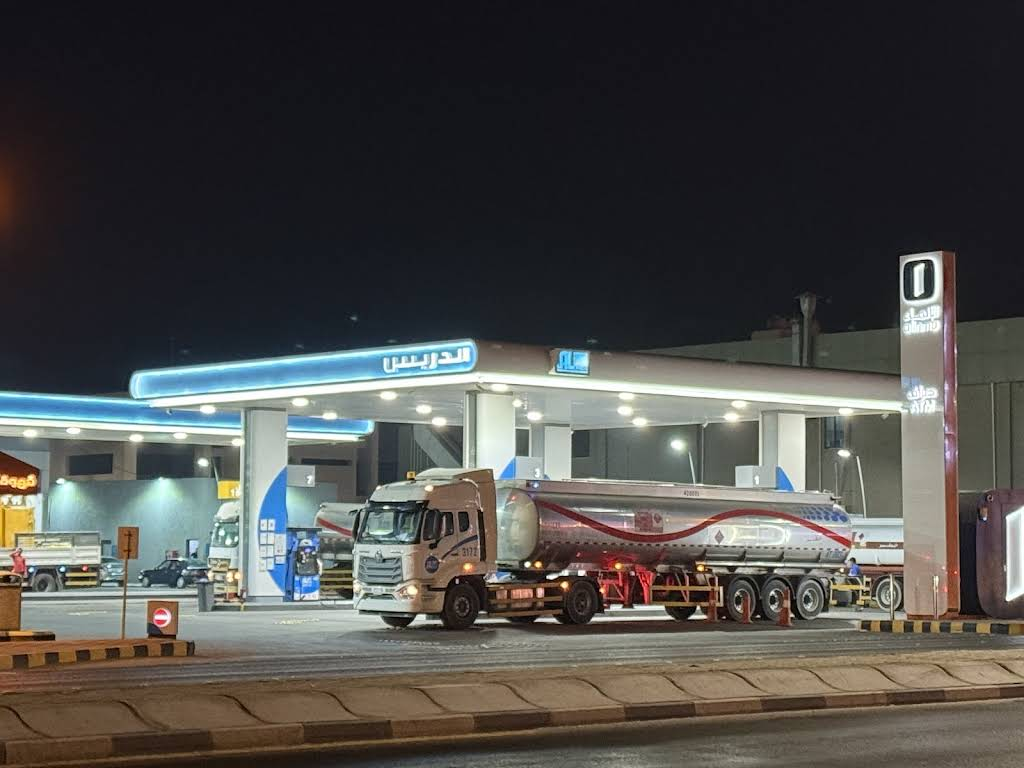
A gas station in Qatif, Eastern Province

The Kingdom's consumption of its own oil production has steadily increased and it now consumes about one quarter of its oil production (approximately three million barrels per day). As of 2012 petrol in Saudi Arabia was sold at a price cheaper than bottled water—approximately US$0.13 per litre ($0.50 per US gallon). According to Jim Krane, "Saudi Arabia now consumes more oil than Germany, an industrialized country with triple the population and an economy nearly five times as large." According to a report by Citigroup's analyst Heidy Rehman, "As a result of its subsidies we calculate 'lost' oil and gas revenues to Saudi Arabia in 2011 to be over $80 billion", adding that "at the domestic level, we believe the only real way to rationalize energy consumption would be to reduce subsidy levels."

Fossil fuel subsidies in Saudi Arabia have been reduced substantially since 2011. In 2016, the kingdom implemented the first wave of fuel price reforms in the 21st century as an initial step towards lowering those consumer subsidies. Citizen Account, a program that was simultaneously enacted to ensure targeted subsidies, ensured only lower-income Saudi citizens received financial support for fuels and other goods. Reforms of crude oil, fuel oil, and natural gas prices were fixed through 2023. Then, an accelerated pace of reform of those fuels' prices took place in 2024 and 2025. The faster adjustments of those fuels' prices took place as renewable power generation started to be installed in substantial numbers. It has been argued that the advent of renewable power generation has facilitated the accelerated lifting of consumer fuel price subsidies in Saudi Arabia.

=== Aramco ===
Until 1973 the government did not receive a share of the oil drilled within its boundaries. In 1973 the Saudi government gained a 25% share of the interest from Aramco. In 1980 the Saudi government purchased nearly 100% of the Aramco oil business giving Saudi officials complete control over prices and production. In 1988 the oil company was renamed Saudi Aramco. The company is controlled by the government but also has a board of advisors and a CEO. The current CEO and President of Saudi Aramco is Amin H. Al-Nasser.

=== Future perspectives ===
The future prospects of energy in Saudi Arabia have been studied extensively by the King Abdullah Petroleum Studies and Research Center (KAPSARC). Furthermore, Saudi officials are not concerned about alternative energy sources hurting the market for its exports. In a 2008 interview with CBS, they asked Saudi Arabia's oil minister the following question: "Let me be blunt, okay? And ask you to be candid: is it Aramco's hope to prevent a switch away from oil? Somebody said, 'The country is the oil business.' You absolutely need to do this for your own survival". The minister responded by stating that:

Yeah, we admit a fact that yes, we depend on the oil industry. We want it to help us, you know, to develop our economy and develop the economy of the world. So what is good for the wellbeing of Saudi Arabia should be good for the wellbeing of the world, too... we have to be realistic. We don't have the alternatives today

Saudi oil policy is shaped by multiple factors and as these factors change and/or as new information becomes available, Saudi Arabia's oil policy will also change.

== Natural gas ==
Saudi Arabia has the world's fourth largest reserves of natural gas, of 6.8×10^{12} cubic metres (240 trillion cubic feet). One-third of this reserve is found in the Ghawar. Before the master gas system, the oil company flared (burned) the gas as it came from the oil well. Until recently production of natural gas was tightly controlled as it is so closely linked to oil production. The World Trade Organization criticized the government and Aramco for heavily subsidizing natural gas. According to the Energy Information Administration the price was US$2.6 per megawatt-hour ($0.75 per million British thermal units). On January 1, 2016, the domestic price of natural gas was raised to $4.3 per megawatt-hour ($1.25 per million British thermal units).

In January 2020, Aramco announced a $1.85 billion investment to set up the first natural gas storage facility in Saudi Arabia. In 2019, a study presented that natural gas storage is only financially viable if Saudi Arabia meets its natural gas production target in 2030.

Also, in February 2020, Aramco initiated a plan to invest $110 billion to develop gas reserves in Al-Jafurah field, Al-Ahsa Governorate, to start production by 2024 to 2036 when fully developed, which is expected to hold 5.7 trillion m^{3} (200 trillion ft^{3}) of wet gas, 21,000 cubic metres (130,000 bbl) per day of ethane and 79,000 cubic metres (500,000 bbl) per day of gas liquids and condensates.

In early 2026, Saudi Aramco signed a 20-year deal to receive 1 million tonnes of liquefied natural gas per year from the US.

== Electricity ==
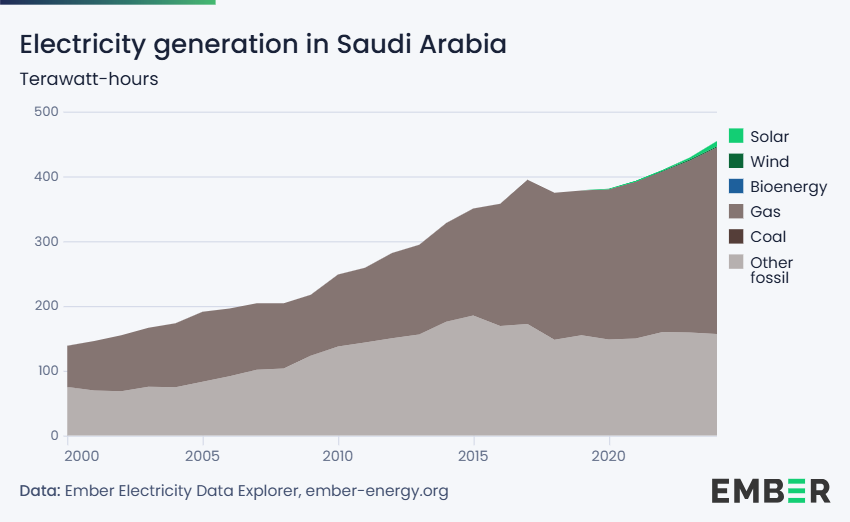
Electricity generation in Saudi Arabia in terawatt-hours

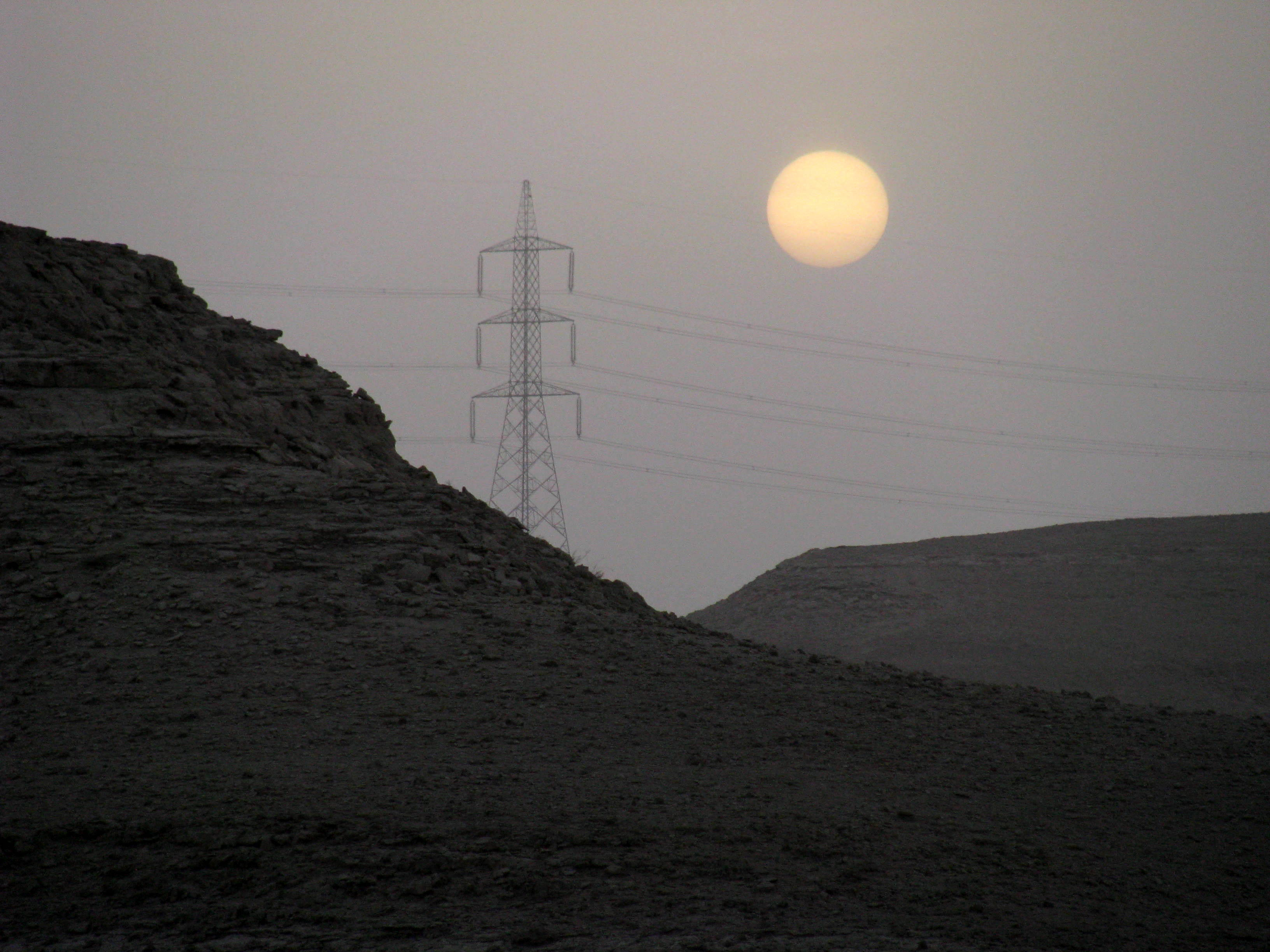
Power line in the desert near Riyadh

Saudi Arabia is the fastest growing electricity consumer in the Middle East, particularly of transportation fuels. In 2005, Saudi Arabia was the world's 15th largest consumer of primary energy, of which over 60 percent was petroleum-based. The remainder was made up of natural gas.

Two ministries share responsibility for the energy sector: the Ministry of Oil and the Ministry of Water and Electricity. The Ministry of Water was created in 2001 by merging water related sub-departments. Its stated purpose is "to prepare a comprehensive plan to establish water and sewage networks all over the Kingdom. It will also develop the country's water policies and propose new regulations to preserve water." In 2003, this department was expanded.

Saudi Arabia is enhancing its electrical power sector infrastructure to accommodate the rising demand from both the residential and commercial sectors, simultaneously advancing its strategy for energy diversification away from traditional oil and gas reliance. The kingdom aims to increase its electricity generation capacity from 83 gigawatts (GW) in 2023 to 110 GW by 2028, supported by a $293 billion investment in both conventional power and renewable energy projects. At the heart of this strategy is Saudi Arabia's goal to generate 50% of its electricity from renewable sources by 2030.

=== Electricity consumption ===
Electricity consumption in Saudi Arabia increased sharply during the 1990–2010 period due to rapid economic development. Peak loads reached nearly 24 GW in 2001—25 times their 1975 level. They reached 74.8 GW in 2024. The investment needed to meet this demand may exceed $90 billion. Consequently, there is an urgent need to develop energy conservation policies for sustainable development.

Electricity generation is 40% from Oil 52% from Natural Gas and 8% from steam. Generation capacity is approximately 55 GW. A looming energy shortage requires Saudi Arabia to increase its capacity. Capacity is planned to be increased to 120 GW by 2032.

The government has approved the construction of a $300 million facility to turn waste into energy. The facility will process 180 tons of waste per day, producing 6 MW of electricity and 250,000 US gallons (950 m^{3}) of distilled water.

=== Conservation ===
Towards the end of 1998, the electricity sector embarked upon a major restructuring program. One of its aims was to achieve sustainable performance. Although progress has been made, remaining challenges, include high demand growth, low generation capacity reserve margins, in efficient energy use, absence of time-of-use rate adjustments, and the need for large capital investments to fund expansion.

Current sustainable policies, particularly those encouraging energy conservation, led to peak load savings of more than 871 MW in 2001, mainly as a result of collaboration between the Ministry of Water and Electricity and the Saudi Electricity Company.

Policies and programs are being developed for public awareness, energy regulation and legislation, and energy information and programming. If energy conservation is successful, demand can be reduced by 5–10%. This is equivalent to 3–6 GW of additional capacity, which represents a possible $1.5–3.0 billion saving over 20 years. Typically, investment in energy efficiency is 1% of utility sales revenues, which for a country like Saudi Arabia could be $15–60 million annually. If only savings on air conditioning are considered, the return on investment is equivalent to 400–500 MW of generating capacity—a saving of up to $0.25 billion p.a.

=== History ===
The development of electricity in the Kingdom of Saudi Arabia can be divided into two stages:

Phase 1: Initially, electricity generation was left to small, local companies. Such companies sold power at varying rates according to local costs.

In 1961 (1381 AH), the Department of Electricity Affairs was established within the Ministry of Commerce, with a mandate to regulate the electricity generation sector and to issue permits and licenses to electricity companies and to encourage national investment.

In 1972 (1392 AH), the Department of Electricity Services was established. This Department was separated from the Ministry of Commerce and was given the additional responsibility of planning electrical services for the Kingdom as a whole.

In 1974 (1394 AH), the Ministry of Commerce was divided into the Commerce Agency and the Industry and Electricity Agency. In that same year, the electricity tariff was set for all companies at a level below their actual costs.

In 1975 (1395 AH), the Government adopted ambitious plans for economic development requiring investment in industry and electrification. The Ministry of Industry and Electricity was formed, with an Industrial Affairs Agency and an Electricity Affairs Agency. The Electricity Affairs Agency expanded the planning, co-ordination and regulatory roles for providing electrical services. The Electricity Corporation was established in 1976 (1396 AH) to coordinate the electricity plans contained in the Kingdom's Development Plan.

From 1976 to 1981 (1396–1401 AH) all community electricity generation was gradually subsumed under the four regional Saudi Consolidated Electricity Companies (SCECOs), located in the Central, Eastern, Southern and Western regions.

With the formulation of a coherent development plan and the establishment of the SCECOs, the Government was able to bring electricity to the towns, villages and settlements throughout the Kingdom.

The number of electricity customers grew from 216,000 in 1970 (1390 AH) to 3,035,000 in 1996 and 4,955,906 in 2006.

In May 2003, electricity was made the responsibility of the Ministry of Water and Electricity.

=== Saudi Consolidated Electricity Companies (SCECOs) ===
The first SCECO (SCECO-East) was created in 1976 (1396/97 AH). This was followed in 1979 (1399/1400 AH) by SCECO-South. Electricity for the southwest is provided by another consolidated company, and the central region is served by SCECO-Central.

The General Electricity Corporation (GEC) had overall responsibility for the Kingdom's electricity system and had direct responsibility for the provision of electrical supplies to rural areas not then covered by the consolidated companies. The GEC represented the government equity holdings in all the independent electricity generating companies and was a source of finance for those companies' capital requirements.

In 1998, the Government announced the reorganization of the electricity sector by establishing a stock market company, named the Saudi Electric Company, through the merger of all the electricity companies operating in the Kingdom.

=== Solar and wind ===
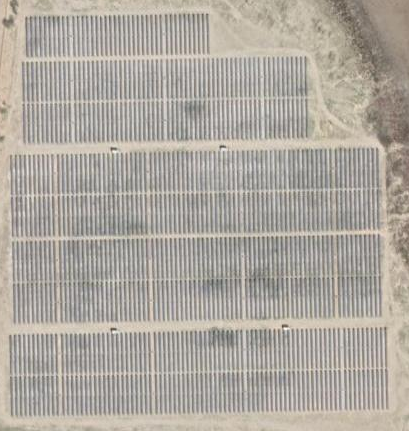
A solar station in Khafji

During the 2012 United Nations Climate Change Conference in Qatar, Saudi Arabia announced its target to receive third of its electricity demand from solar power with 41 GW of solar capacity by 2032. Same time was announced investment in 17 new nuclear reactors in next 20 years. Indeed, Saudi Arabia has been ranked the 6th in solar energy potential.

Saudi Arabia's Ministry of Energy is advancing its National Renewable Energy Program with a $50 billion plan aimed to develop 30 solar and wind projects by 2030. This effort aims to increase electricity generation and reduce oil dependency. The program targets achieving 40 GW of photovoltaic (PV) solar capacity, 16 GW of wind capacity, and 2.7 GW of concentrated solar power (CSP) capacity by 2030. Key projects include the King Abdullah Petroleum Studies and Research Center's solar endeavor and Saudi Aramco's PV carport system. In addition, ACWA Power has recently completed the Al Shuaibah solar projects, which are expected to supply approximately 2.6 GW of solar electricity to the country.

=== Nuclear ===
In 2010, King Abdullah City for Atomic and Renewable Energy was established. The Saudi government plans a $100 billion program of nuclear power with the goal of generating 110 gigawatts by 2032, using at least 12 nuclear power plants which are intended to begin coming into operation in 2019. They have been negotiating with France, China, Japan, Korea, Russia, and Argentina over access to nuclear technology.

In 2018, Saudi Arabia appointed WorleyParsons as the Project Management Office (PMO) for its nuclear energy program under the King Abdullah City for Atomic and Renewable Energy (KACARE). That year, Assystem, a French engineering company, carried out detailed site characterization studies for Saudi Arabia's proposed nuclear plant, which is planned to have two reactors with a total capacity of 1.2 to 1.6 gigawatts (GW). Following the government's approval of the nuclear program in 2019, Saudi Arabia established the Saudi Nuclear Energy Holding Company in March 2022 to lead its civil nuclear efforts.

The nuclear ambitions of the Kingdom of Saudi Arabia have led to heightened concern in the United States Congress, especially since the crown prince of Saudi Arabia Mohammed bin Salman, claimed in 2018 that the country will immediately follow suit if regional rival Iran developed a nuclear bomb. A 17 September 2020 publication by The Guardian claimed that Saudi Arabia holds enough reserves to mine uranium ore to produce nuclear fuel, raising concerns regarding the Gulf nation's interest in the atomic weapons program. The source of the information was a report compiled by the Beijing Research Institute of Uranium Geology (BRIUG) and China National Nuclear Corporation (CNNC) that have been working for the Saudi Geological Survey.

== Business persons ==
Forbes ranked Mohammed Al Amoudi as richest Saudi Arabian in energy business in 2013.

== Carbon dioxide emissions ==
Saudi Arabia was the 15th top carbon dioxide emitter per capita in the world in 2009: 18.56 tonnes per capita.

== See also ==
- Economy of Saudi Arabia
- List of power stations in Saudi Arabia
- Saudi Arabia energy law
