= Pakistan–Sudan relations =

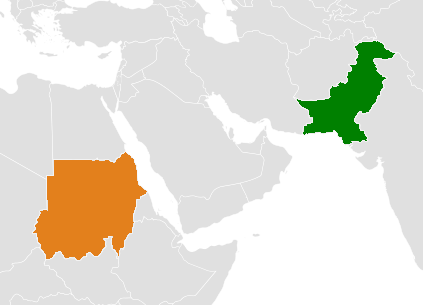

- Pakistan: Sudan

Pakistan–Sudan relations refer to the bilateral relations between Pakistan and Sudan. Both countries share the same religion as well as the historical baggage of colonial rule. Both countries are members of the Organisation of Islamic Cooperation, Like Minded Group, Non-Aligned Movement and Group of 77. Pakistan has an embassy in Khartoum. Sudan has an embassy in Islamabad.

Bilateral relations strengthened when Sudan declared its support for Pakistan in the Indo-Pakistani wars, and Pakistan stood by Sudan over its integrity and sovereignty, especially on its boundary disputes with both Egypt and South Sudan. Pakistan Armed Forces also contributed to the UN peacekeeping force in Sudan with 1,542 personnel and 92 observers during the Second Sudanese Civil War.

Through various memorandums of understanding, the two cooperate in the fields of agriculture, healthcare and education. Pakistan is also supporting Sudan with higher education, as more than five hundred students from Sudan study in the universities of Pakistan, which is the highest number of Sudanese students in any foreign country. In the past, Pakistan has offered medical training to Sudanese without any tuition fees. Sudan donated generously in the relief efforts during the earthquake in 2005 and the floods in 2010 in Pakistan. In turn, Pakistan has sent aid to Sudan during drought and famine. UNMIS Pakistani contingent regularly holds free clinics in remote areas of Blue Nile State that are currently inaccessible by land. In 2009, the 37th such event was held near Ad-Damazin, where over 1,500 patients were treated. In 2016, Senator Raja Zafar ul Haq inaugurated Pakistan–Sudan People's Friendship Association to promote opportunities for research, education, agriculture, health, business, trade, culture, tourism and youth cooperation. Roughly 1500 Pakistanis were residing in Sudan and were involved in small businesses before 2023. However, around 1000 Pakistanis were evacuated out of Sudan in May 2023 due to the fighting that had erupted on April 15, 2023, between Sudan’s army and the paramilitary Rapid Support Forces (RSF), has brought air strikes and artillery battles to Khartoum and its adjoining cities of Omdurman and Bahri, causing a threat to civilian life. As part of the commitment to Sudan, the Pakistan Army sent a contingent of 202 soldiers to Sudan in May 2016 on the UN's peacekeeping mission.

In 2014, President Mamnoon Hussain proposed a third round of Pakistan-Sudan Joint Ministerial Commission (JMC) to enhance cooperation in trade, economic and defence sectors. In 2016, the fourth round of bilateral political consultations between Pakistan and Sudan was held in Islamabad. The Undersecretary of the Ministry of Foreign Affairs of Sudan, Ambassador Abdul-Ghani Al-Naeim, met with Sartaj Aziz as Pakistan pursued the 'Look Africa' policy. As part of the Africa policy, Pakistan seeks stronger relations with African countries through enhanced trade, investment and defence cooperation, establishing joint ventures and public-private partnerships.
