= Mujahid Force =

Irregular infantry regiment of Pakistan Army

Mujahid Force Regiment
- مجاہد فورس رجمنٹ
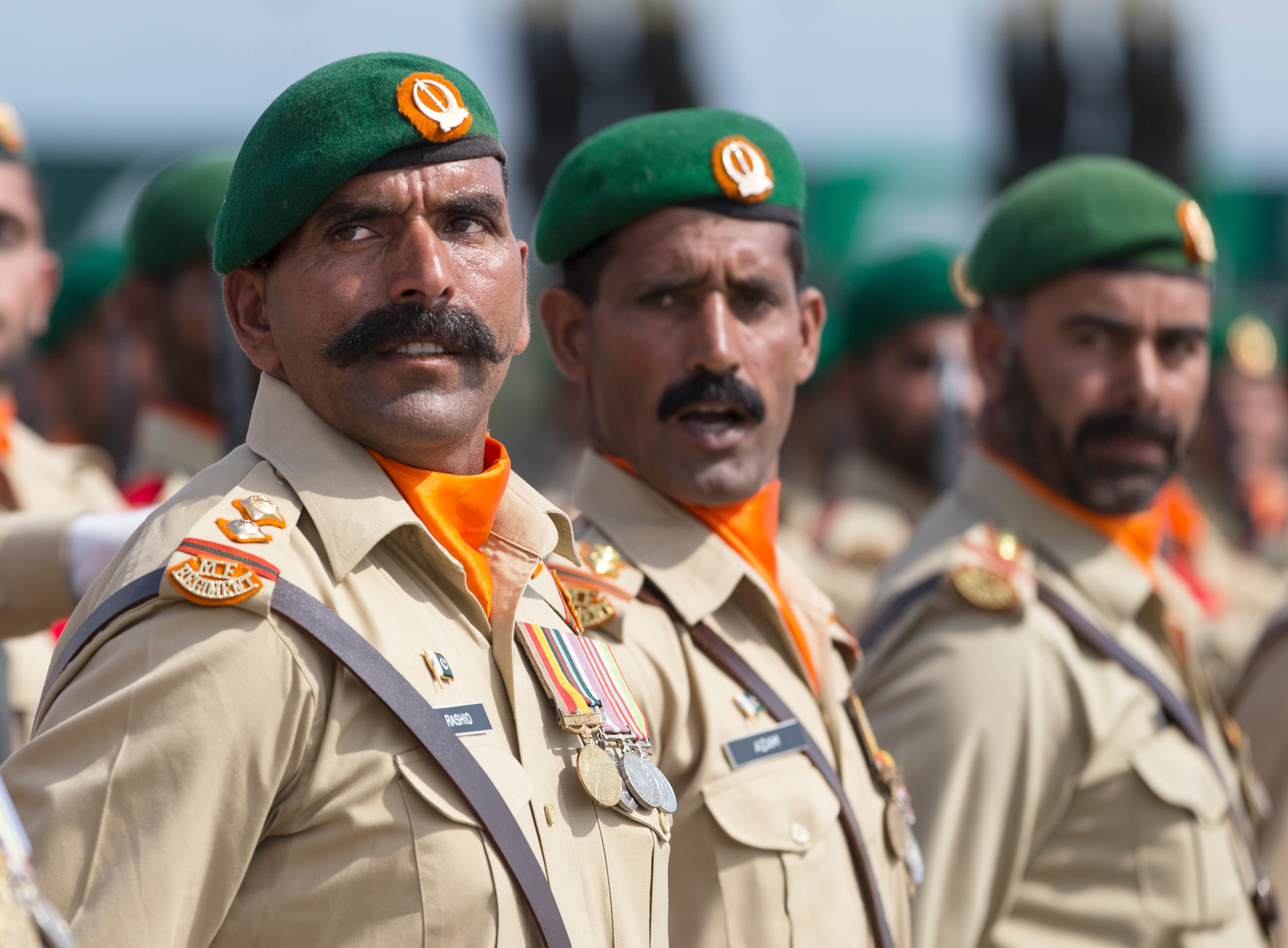
- Soldiers from the Mujahid Force during the Pakistan Day Parade in 2016
- Founded: 1965
- Country: Pakistan
- Branch: Pakistan Army
- Role: Infantry, Artillery
- Size: 27 active battalions
- Part of: Pakistan Army
- Force Centre: Bhimber, Azad Kashmir
- Nickname: 'Mujahids'
- Mottos: Arabic:جہاد فی سبیل اللہ; Jihad fi-Sabilillah
- Colours
- Engagements: Second Indo−Pakistani War; Indo-Pakistani War of 1971; 2019 India–Pakistan border skirmishes

Commanders
- Director Mujahid Force: Brig. Tahir Ali Syed
- Colonel Commandant: Lt. Gen Amer Ahsan Nawaz
- Notable commanders: General Nadeem Raza

The Mujahid Force Regiment (Urdu: مجاہد فورس رجمنٹ) is an infantry unit of the Pakistan Army tasked with securing the Line of Control (LOC) and supplementing the regular army during national emergencies and wartime. Initially established in 1965 as part of the National Guard, it continued under this designation until 1992. In 2019, it was officially recognized as an infantry unit of the Pakistan Army. The regiment headquarters is located in Bhimber, Azad Kashmir.

== History ==
The force was established in 1965, and was merged into the National Guard when that organization was formed in 1972. The Force is further regulated by the National Guards Act, 1973, which became law on 12 August 1973. This law sets out, amongst other things, the criteria for applicants and that the Force personnel were subject to military law with respect to criminal charges. It was raised as a reserve force to support and supplement the regular Army during national emergencies and war. The headquarters are in Bhimber, Azad Kashmir, established in 1992.

The Force was originally intended as a border guard unit but has been involved in military actions in recent years. In August 2012, it was reported it was being trained by the Special Service Group (special forces) as part of cross-border infiltration efforts by the Pakistan Army. In 2018, the force was alleged to have deployed four battalions to the Line of Control in Kashmir, to engage in cross-border infiltration activities against Indian forces. Later in 2018, it was announced that several temporary battalions were to be given permanent status. In November 2019, after the dissolution of the Indian state of Jammu and Kashmir, the Force was reported to have deployed about 17,000 personnel in 25 battalions, closer to the Line of Control.

== Training ==
Some members of the Force have been trained alongside military personnel at the Pakistan Military Academy in Kakul, with the 12th such intake graduating in March 2022.

== Insignia ==
The Force badge depicts a star held up by two pointed ends of a crescent super imposed with a dagger in vertical position in clasped wrist pointing upward, resting on a scroll with a war cry inscribed in Arabic.

== Public image ==
The Force regularly participates in public events. For example, the 760th Battalion was involved in the Pakistan Day military parade in Islamabad on 23 March 2017.

The Mujahid Force was involved in controversy in June 2019 when it advertised jobs for sanitation workers but specified that only non-Muslims should apply, although the advertisement was soon withdrawn.

== Engagements ==
- Indo-Pakistani War of 1965
- Indo-Pakistani War of 1971
- Fire exchange along the Line of Control since 1991

== Units ==
Known battalions

- 641 Battalion
- 642 Battalion
- 645 Battalion
- 646 Battalion
- 647 Battalion
- 648 Battalion
- 649 Battalion
- 651 Battalion
- 654 Battalion
- 655 Battalion
- 658 Battalion
- 702 sherdil Battalion
- 741 Battalion
- 760 Battalion
- 792 Battalion
- 801 Battalion
- 815 Mujahid Battalion (JANGJU)
- 816 Mujahid Battalion (Tigers)
- 831 Mujahid Field Regiment (Chamb Tigers)
- 833 Mujahid Medium Regiment Artillery (TAKBEERI)
- 834 Battalion (JANFISHAN)

== Colonel Commandants ==
Colonel Commandants of the Mujahid Force
| S# | Commandants | From | To |
|---|---|---|---|
| | Lt General Nadeem Raza | 2017 | 2018 |
| | Lt General Bilal Akbar | 2018 | 2019 |

== See also ==
- Azad Kashmir Regiment
- Janbaz Force
- Mujahid Bahini (East Pakistan)
