= King Abdullah City for Atomic and Renewable Energy =

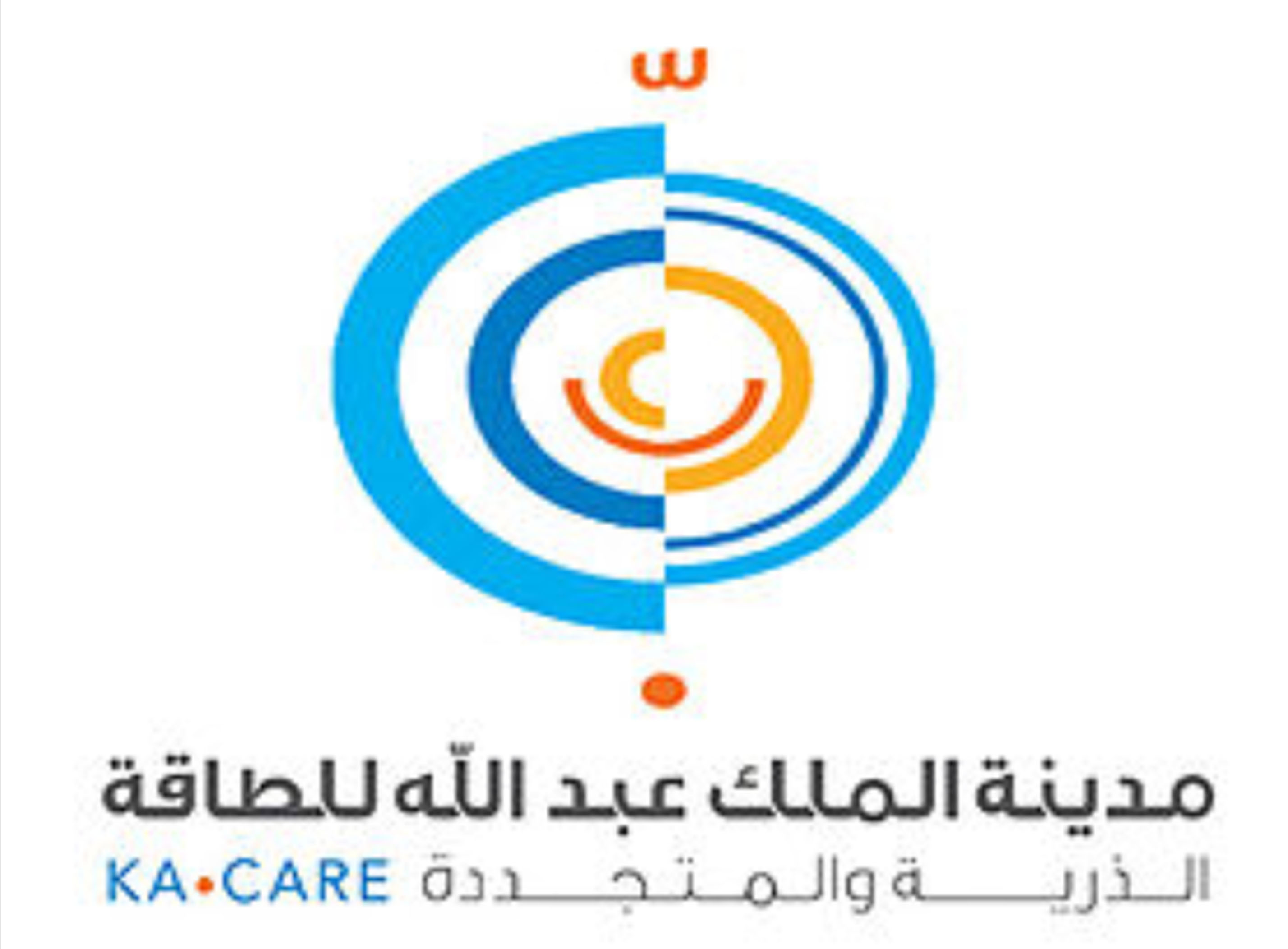
- King Abdullah City for Atomic and Renewable Energy
- Established: 1431هــ / 2010م
- Founder: The Custodian of the Two Holy Mosques King Abdullah bin Abdulaziz Al Saud
- Headquarters: Olaya St., Riyadh City, P.O Box 2022، Riyadh 11451 KSA
- President: H.E Dr. Khalid ben Saleh Al Sultan
- Website: www.kacare.gov.sa

The King Abdullah City for Atomic and Renewable Energy (K.A.C.A.R.E.) is a scientific research and governmental entity in the Kingdom of Saudi Arabia and is chaired by the Minister of Energy. K.A.C.A.R.E. was founded in 2010 with a mandate to develop nuclear and renewable energy in Saudi Arabia. It is headquartered in Riyadh city.

K.A.C.A.R.E. conducts research and focuses on collaborating with government agencies, scientific institutions, and international partners.

== Leadership ==
- H.R.H. Abdulaziz bin Salman – President (2022 – present)
- H.E Dr. Khalid ben Saleh Al-Sultan – President (2018 – 2022)
- H.E Dr. Hashim ben Abdullah Yamani - President (2010 – 2018)
- H.E Dr. Walid ben Hussain Abu Alfaraj - Vice President (2010 – 2018)
- H.E Dr. Khalid ben Mohammed Al Sulaiman – Vice President for Renewable Energy (2010 – 2014)

== Mission ==
K.A.C.A.R.E works on proposing a national policy for nuclear and renewable energy and implementing this strategic plan. It also establishes and manages projects to achieve its objectives, including using nuclear and renewable energy sources to achieve a sustainable national energy mix, as well as research and development centers to promote sustainable development within the Saudi Arabian economy.

K.A.C.A.R.E. also specializes in achieving the following:

- Proposing the national policy for the development of an efficient and balanced national energy sector that contributes to the development of the local economy as well as the development of the strategies and plans necessary for its implementation.
- Qualification of national work force
- Provide renewable energy data to the private sector in order to select the areas with the best solar radiation for the establishment of renewable energy projects in the Kingdom.
- Supports joint research programs between the Kingdom and the international scientific institutions to keep abreast of the continuous scientific development in nuclear and renewable energy technologies.
- Conduct feasibility studies for nuclear reactors for peaceful uses.
- Raise awareness of the importance of atomic and renewable energy for the future of the national economy
- Partnership and cooperation with the largest international suppliers of nuclear technology to familiarize them with the objectives of the components of the “Saudi National Atomic Energy Project” in the Kingdom, especially in the field of large nuclear reactors, and the Kingdom's aim to enter into the peaceful use of nuclear energy to produce electricity and desalinated water.

== Projects and Initiatives ==
- Saudi National Atomic Energy Project (SNEAP):

The National Atomic Energy Project was established in 2017 and consists of four main components:

1. LeadershipLarge Nuclear Power Plants (LNPP):

These are reactors with an electric capacity of 1,200-1,600 megawatts of power per reactor, which contribute to support the base load in the grid throughout the year.

2. LeadershipSmall Module Reactors (SMR):

These reactors enable the Kingdom to own and develop atomic energy technologies and build them in isolated places from the electrical grid which suits its water desalination requirements and various thermal applications in the petrochemical industries. Small Module Reactors consist of HTGR reactors and SMART technology reactors.

3. LeadershipNuclear Fuel Cycle (NFC):

It represents the first step of the Kingdom in the path of self-sufficiency in the production of nuclear fuel, which will contribute to the rehabilitation of the national workforce competent in the process of exploration and production of uranium and the use of experience gained in this project to develop the Kingdom's natural resources of uranium.

4. Nuclear & Radiological Regulatory Commission (NRRC):

The Regulator is an independent body that monitors and supervises the implementation of all components of the “Saudi National Atomic Energy Project” in Saudi Arabia to ensure the highest levels of safety aimed at protecting individuals, society, environment and nuclear installations from ionizing radiation and radiation activities in the Kingdom.

== K.A.C.A.R.E’s Renewable Energy Initiatives ==
K.A.C.A.R.E has three initiatives linked to the “National Industrial Development and Logistics Program”, which is one of the programs to realize the kingdom's Vision 2030.

(1) National Data Centers for Renewable Energy Initiative:

The National Data Center for Renewable Energy provides data for studies, research and projects to serve a wide range of users, such as investors, researchers, technology developers and others. Additionally the National Data Center also provides simulation, modeling and forecasting tools for renewable energy. It provides a picture of the state of the renewable energy sector in the Kingdom and its growth rates employing means of data intelligence.

(2) Renewable Energy Technologies Localization Initiative:

The Renewable Energy Technologies Localization Program aims at increasing the local content of the renewable energy technologies sector by accelerating the growth of the local private sector and supporting local companies to develop products, applications and services in the field of renewable energy. The empowerment of the local private sector is achieved through the establishment of joint ventures projects led by the private sector and in accordance to international best practices, as well as the standard studies carried out by K.A.C.A.R.E. through applying the principle of cost sharing between the government and the local private sector.

(3) Human Capacity Building Initiative:

K.A.C.A.R.E. cooperates with various stakeholders within the Kingdom and with international institutions to further develop human capital in line with the labor market.

The main objectives of the capacity building initiative are:

- Attracting manpower and improving employment
- Supporting the development of the environmental education system
- Support the localization of technology and the transfer of knowledge through the development of human workforce.

== See also ==
- Energy in Saudi Arabia
- Nuclear energy in Saudi Arabia
- Nuclear program of Saudi Arabia
