= Janbaz Force =

Pakistani paramilitary force

- جان باز فورس
- Country: Pakistan
- Branch: Pakistan Army
- Role: Infantry
- Part of: National Guard
- Engagements: Indo-Pakistani War of 1965; Indo-Pakistani War of 1971

The Janbaz Force (Urdu: جان باز فورس) is a component of the National Guard of Pakistan, and a paramilitary force under the command of the Pakistan Army. It acts as a reserve force for the regular Army in times of national emergency or war. The force has two main tasks: operating air defence batteries and providing localised infantry companies.

== History ==
The force was raised in 1973, as part of the National Guard. The Force is further regulated by the National Guards Act, 1973, which became law on 12 August 1973. This law sets out, amongst other things, the criteria for applicants and that the Force personnel were subject to military law with respect to criminal charges. However, the pay and conditions compare unfavourably with those of the regular Army and the Mujahid Force including how pensions are awarded.

The Force was originally intended as a part-time volunteer force, comparable to the Indian Home Guard, organised by districts and controlled by the Army Headquarters.

== Training ==
The training for members of the force includes various local centres such as in Muzaffarabad, Azad Kashmir, and courses at state-run institutions such as the Government Post Graduate College in Sheikhupura.

== Engagements ==
- Indo-Pakistani War of 1965
- Indo-Pakistani War of 1971

== See also ==
- Mujahid Force
