= List of ambassadors of Pakistan to Saudi Arabia =

Ambassador of the Islamic Republic of Pakistan to the Kingdom of Saudi Arabia
- State Emblem of Pakistan
- Incumbent; Ahmed Farooq since 24 May 2023
- Style: His Excellency
- Residence: Riyadh, Saudi Arabia.
- Nominator: Prime Minister of Pakistan
- Formation: 1951
- Website: Pakistan Embassy – Riyadh, Saudi Arabia.

The Pakistan Ambassador to the Saudi Arabia is in charge of the Embassy of Pakistan, Riyadh, Saudi Arabia and Pakistan's diplomatic mission to the Kingdom of Saudi Arabia. The official title is Ambassador of the Islamic Republic of Pakistan to the Kingdom of Saudi Arabia.

Ahmed Farooq is the current ambassador to Saudi Arabia, serving since May 2023.

== List of Pakistani ambassadors to the Saudi Arabia ==
| Name and Title | Image | Entered office | Left office |
|---|---|---|---|
| Khwaja Shahabuddin | | 1954 | 1958 |
| Chaudhry Ali Akbar Khan | | 1958 | 1962 |
| Asad Durrani | | 2000 | 7 October 2002 |
| Abdul Aziz Mirza | | 08 October 2002 | 27 January 2005 |
| Shahid Karimullah | | 29 January 2005 | 21 March 2009 |
| Umer Khan Sherzai | | 1 November 2009 | 31 January 2011 |
| Naeem Khan | | 20 June 2011 | 27 May 2014 |
| Manzoor ul Haq | | 4 January 2015 | |
| Khan Hasham bin Saddique | | 2 April 2017 | 210 January 2019 |
| Raja Ali Ejaz | | 21 January 2019 | 25 April 2021 |
| Lt Gen (R) Bilal Akbar | | 26 April 2021 | 07 November 2021 |
| Ameer Khurram Rathore | | 07 November 2021 | 23 March 2023 |
| Ahmed Farooq | | 24 May 2023 | Incumbent |
