= Al Sulayyil ballistic missile base =

Ballistic missile base near Al-Sulayyil, Saudi Arabia

- Part of Saudi Arabian Armed Forces

Site information
- Type: Ballistic missile base
- Owner: R.S. Missile Defense
- Controlled by: Saudi Arabia

Location
- Coordinates: 20°42′57″N 45°34′54″E

Site history
- Built: 1987

The Al Sulayyil ballistic missile base is a Saudi ballistic missile facility near the town of Al-Sulayyil, 450 km southwest of the Saudi Arabian capital Riyadh. Constructed in 1987–1988, it is the first missile base of the Kingdom.

== Location and layout ==
Al-Sulayyil RSSMF base was built in low mountain terrain at coordinates: 20°43′07″N 45°35′01″E. The base houses two missile garrisons (a north and a south), with a third area providing housing, maintenance, and administrative functions. The garrisons themselves are located a short distance apart within a secured complex. The administrative and support complexes are outside the security perimeter to the south. The missile garrisons have parking slots for mobile launchers and two large launch pads that are identical to ones that can be seen at Chinese DF-3 (CSS-2) Dongfeng missile bases. The liquid-fueled DF-3A is an early Chinese nuclear intermediate-range ballistic missile bought by Saudi Arabia in 1987 and is believed to have a range of 4,000 - 5,000 km, with a 2,000 kg warhead.

== See also ==
- List of military installations in Saudi Arabia
