= Section 123 Agreement =

Agreement in the US Atomic Energy Act of 1954

123 Agreement countries as of February 2025: Current; Euratom members / Former; United States

Section 123 of the United States Atomic Energy Act of 1954, titled "Cooperation With Other Nations", establishes an agreement for cooperation as a prerequisite for nuclear deals between the US and any other nation. Such an agreement is called a 123 Agreement. To date, the U.S. has entered into roughly twenty-six 123 Agreements with 52 countries.

== Agreement Countries ==
Countries with which the U.S. has a Section 123 Agreement as of 2025 include:

=== Current ===
- Argentina
- Australia
- Brazil
- Canada
- China (with re-processing rights, requiring approval per each request)
- (Europe) Euratom (with automatic re-processing rights)
- (United Nations) International Atomic Energy Agency (IAEA)
- India (With advance consent to reprocessing), exempt from certain safeguards by India–United States Civil Nuclear Agreement.
- Indonesia
- Japan (with automatic re-processing rights)
- Kazakhstan
- Mexico
- Morocco
- Norway
- Philippines
- Russia
- Singapore
- South Korea
- Switzerland
- Taiwan via the American Institute in Taiwan
- Thailand (1974–2014, 2025–2065)
- Turkey
- Ukraine
- UAE, U.S.–UAE 123 Agreement for Peaceful Civilian Nuclear Energy Cooperation
- UK
- Vietnam

=== Former ===
- Bangladesh: September 17, 1981 - June 24, 2012
- Colombia
- Egypt
- South Africa: December 4, 1997 - December 4, 2022

=== Proposed ===
- Romania (Never signed, superseded by Euratom agreement once Romania joined the EU)
- Saudi Arabia (agreement)
