= Muhammad Naeem Khan (diplomat) =

Pakistani diplomat

Assistant Secretary General of Organization of Islamic Cooperation
- In office 1 July 2014 – 2019

Pakistan Ambassador to Saudi Arabia
- In office 20 June 2011 – 27 May 2014
- President: Asif Zardari; Mamnoon Hussain
- Prime Minister: Yousaf Raza Gillani; Raja Pervaiz Ashraf; Mir Hazar Khan Khoso; Nawaz Sharif
- Preceded by: Umer Khan Sherzai

Muhammad Naeem Khan is a retired Pakistani diplomat and former Assistant Secretary General of Organization of Islamic Cooperation OIC.

He was appointed by Government of Pakistan as Pakistani Ambassador to Saudi Arabia from 20 June 2011 to 27 May 2014, before being elected as Assistant Secretary General of OIC. He also served as Additional Foreign Secretary and Spokesperson at Foreign Office of Pakistan.
