= Nuclear power in Saudi Arabia =

Saudi Arabia has no nuclear power plants. However, the country has plans to create a domestic nuclear industry in anticipation of high growth in domestic energy consumption. The government's objective is to use nuclear plants to replace oil-fired power stations, thus freeing oil for export.

The Saudi program is reckoned to be the second most developed in the Arab world, behind their Persian Gulf neighbour United Arab Emirates. In 2010, the King Abdallah Center for Atomic and Renewable Energy (KAcare) was founded to oversee Saudi Arabia's nuclear program under its president, Hashim Abdullah Yamani (former minister of energy and of commerce). KAcare will represent Saudi Arabia at the IAEA and be responsible for Saudi nuclear energy power, supervision of nuclear power production and management of nuclear waste.

== Agreements ==
Saudi Arabia has no fuel production facilities and would be reliant on nuclear fuel from the global market. In 2010, a deal was signed with Toshiba and Shaw to build reactors in Saudi Arabia, and with Exelon to manage the nuclear facilities. The group will either be using the Advanced Boiling Water Reactor or Westinghouse's AP1000.

In February 2011, Saudi Arabia signed its first nuclear accord with France, a leader in nuclear technology exports. It is expected that Saudi Arabia will build a number of nuclear reactors in the near future with the aid of France to expand King Abdullah's Atomic and Renewable Energy City devoted to research and the peaceful application of nuclear energy.

In March 2015, a memorandum of understanding was signed between Saudi Arabia and South Korea. This could lead to the construction of at least two South Korean-designed SMART reactors in Saudi Arabia. SMART stands for System-integrated Modular Advanced ReacTor.

In 2017, the China National Nuclear Corporation (CNNC) signed a memorandum of understanding (MoU) with the Saudi Geological Survey, where the two countries collaborated to identify prospective uranium deposits. Concluded by the end of 2019, the work by geologists identified that were capable of producing 90,000 tonnes of uranium. In September 2020, The Guardian reported on the basis of a confidential report prepared by CNNC and the Beijing Research Institute of Uranium Geology (BRIUG) that Saudi Arabia had enough uranium ore reserves for domestic production of nuclear fuel. Some of the deposits were identified in the country’s northwestern region, where the city of Neom was being planned to be constructed. However, concerns regarding the Kingdom’s interest in an atomic weapons programme were intensifying, citing the lack of transparency of Saudi.

In April 2019, the IAEA confirmed that Saudi Arabia was likely to have a functioning nuclear reactor within a year, but had not agreed to IAEA inspections.

In January 2023, Saudi Arabian Energy Minister Prince Abdulaziz Bin Salman said Saudi Arabia plans to use domestically-sourced uranium in its future nuclear power industry, including developing the full nuclear fuel cycle. He said "This would involve the entire nuclear fuel cycle which involves the production of yellowcake, low enriched uranium and the manufacturing of nuclear fuel both for our national use and, of course, for export."

== See also ==
- Nuclear program of Saudi Arabia
- IP3 International
