= Al-Watah ballistic missile base =

Saudi ballistic missile base

Site information
- Type: Missile base
- Owner: Royal Saudi Strategic Missile Force
- Controlled by: Saudi Arabia

Location
- Location within Saudi Arabia
- Coordinates: 24.213691°N 44.701952°E

Site history
- Built: 2007

Al-Watah ballistic missile base is a ballistic missile facility in the low but quite rocky mountains near the town of Al-Watah, Saudi Arabia, 200 km west-southwest of the capital, Riyadh.

== Overview ==
Analysts think that the base was built no earlier than 2008. The base has several underground entry gates, parking slots for mobile launchers and two large launch pads that are identical to ones that can be seen at Chinese DF-3 (CSS-2) Dongfeng missile bases. The liquid-fueled DF-3A is an early Chinese nuclear weapon Intermediate-range ballistic missile and is believed to have a range of 4,000 – 5,000 km with a 2,000 kg warhead. Michael Elleman and Joseph S. Bermudez Jr. stated that the site appeared to have a rocket-engine production and test facility.

Construction of the base likely began in 2013.

== See also ==
- List of military installations in Saudi Arabia
