= IP3 International =

Nuclear technology company formed in June 2016

IP3 International (International Peace, Power and Prosperity) is a nuclear technology company formed in June 2016. One project involved a plan to transfer nuclear technology from the United States to Saudi Arabia.

== History ==
During the 2016 U.S. presidential campaign of Donald Trump, and subsequently, Trump aides Michael Flynn and Jared Kushner were engaged in promoting IP3 International's plan to transfer nuclear technology from the US to Saudi Arabia, for use in a proposed joint US-Russian project, in possible violation of the Atomic Energy Act. In January 2017, Derek Harvey, a retired Army intelligence officer, former staffer for David Petraeus, and then-staffer of the National Security Council under Michael Flynn, advocated for the IP3 nuclear sales plan. Harvey continued to speak with Michael Flynn "every night" even after Flynn resigned.

In February 2019, United States House Committee on Oversight and Reform chairman Elijah E. Cummings released a report on the matter, based in part upon testimony from whistleblowers within White House. The House Oversight Committee released a second interim staff report and supporting documents in July 2019, highlighting the "gold standard" of nuclear proliferation. It also reported lobbying by Flynn and Barrack and briefings to White House members including President Trump, Jared Kushner, Gary Cohn, Mike Pompeo, and Rick Perry.

== Personnel ==
Notable personnel include:

- Keith B. Alexander, cofounder and director, retired Army general, former director of the National Security Agency
- Lars Buttler, director, founder of Trion Worlds gaming
- James Cartwright, director, retired Marine Corps general, pardoned by President Obama after pleading guilty for leaking classified information
- Jack Keane, cofounder and director, retired Army general
- Robert McFarlane, cofounder and director, retired Marine Corps officer, pardoned by President George H.W. Bush after pleading guilty for involvement in the Iran-Contra affair
- Eric T. Olson, director, retired Navy admiral, former Navy SEAL
- Mike Rogers, director, former Republican congressional representative for Michigan
- Frances Townsend, director, former Homeland Security Advisor, former Justice Department attorney
- Alan Dunn, chief legal officer, twin brother of Congressman Neal Dunn and director of the failed 2018 US Expo Pavilion in Dubai, for which he was sued by the Attorney General of the District of Columbia.
- Michael J. Wallace, director, former head of Constellation Energy, member of National Infrastructure Advisory Council, member of Center for Strategic and International Studies

Michael Flynn has described himself as an advisor to IP3, which the company denies. The company does acknowledge that it has a relationship with Flynn and some officials of the company were part of ACU Strategic Partners, but had differences with Russian partnership which was advocated by its managing partner, Alex Copson.

== See also ==
- Nuclear energy in Saudi Arabia
