= King Salman Air Base =

Military air base in Saudi Arabia

King Salman Air Base
- قاعدة الملك سلمان الجوية
- Riyadh, Riyadh Province in Saudi Arabia

Site information
- Type: Airbase
- Owner: Ministry of Defense
- Operator: Royal Saudi Air Force

Location
- Shown within Saudi Arabia
- Coordinates: 24°28′12″N 46°39′34″E
- Area: 45sqkm

Site history
- Built: 2025

Airfield information
- Identifiers: ICAO: OESN
- Elevation: 635 metres (2,083 ft) AMSL
Runways
Direction	Length and surface
02L/20R	3,500 metres (11,483 ft) Asphalt
2R/20L	4,240 metres (13,911 ft) Asphalt

King Salman Air Base (Arabic: قاعدة الملك سلمان الجوية) (ICAO: OESN) is a Royal Saudi Air Force (RSAF) base located south of Riyadh. It is aimed at relocating RSAF operations from the old Riyadh Air Base to the new site, which was demolished between 2021 and 2022 for Saudi Vision 2030. The air base was officially inaugurated on 9 December, 2025, by Saudi Crown Prince Mohammed bin Salman.

== History ==
Originally served Riyadh was the former Riyadh Air Base, it was located at 24°42′35″N 46°43′31″E. The old airport was demolished to construct King Salman Park, with airport grounds are now converted into construction sites and hills and the Air Base is demolished for the sake of the project.

=== Construction ===
The Ministry of Defense and Royal Saudi Air Force began the relocation from the former King Salman Air Base to the new site. On 14 May 2020, the site was handed over to its contractors, and construction began in the third-quarter of 2021. It is located on a 45-square-kilometer site in southwest Riyadh. The construction included new facilities such as security facilities, runways, yards, aircraft maintenance facilities, public facilities, residential, and administrative areas. The project totaled up to 100 buildings, each equipped with its own emergency generator. Contractors involved in handling construction, project management, and site operations include Nesma & Partners, Almabani General Contractors, ATS, El Seif Engineering, and Double Vision Ltd (KSAB DIRAB project).

The Naseem Al Namaa company was contracted to install wide electrical LV & MV networks and telecom networks. The Samnan Group was responsible for providing tanks, control panels, pumps, and other fuel systems. The work was overseen by engineers.

By 2024, both runways were paved. On 5 January 2025, the Riyadh Municipality began a comprehensive development project to improve traffic movement at the entrance of the air base and Al-Nafud Road. This included the implementation of excavation and backfilling works to prepare infrastructure, in addition to rainwater drainage networks. Works were also being made to pave roads and the installation of lighting systems. The additions opened in June 2025, contributing to the Kingdom's Vision 2030.

=== Operation ===
Construction spanned 38 months, and was completed between October-November 2024. Two runways, aircraft parking aprons, helicopter pads, multiple hangars, and an ATC tower were completed, covering approximately 45 million square meters. Additionally completed were technical, administrative, residential, and security facilities, which covered approximately 126,000 square meters. On 2 October, 2025, the King Salman Control Zone was activated, with a 3 nautical-mile radius centred at 24°28′06″N 46°39′01″E, extending vertically from the surface to 4,000 ft above mean sea level (ASML). The CTR operates 24/7, is controlled by SALMAN Tower with radiotelephony communications spoken in English, and is classified as Class D airspace. On 9 December, 2025, King Salman Air Base was officially inaugurated by Saudi Crown Prince Mohammed bin Salman, which included a formal opening ceremony also attended by Minister of Defense Prince Khalid bin Salman Al Saud, senior military leaders, and other government officials. During the ceremony, the Crown Prince toured the base and received briefings on various on-site facilities. King Salman Air Base is capable of supporting fourth-generation and fifth-generation aircraft, and also advanced unmanned aerial vehicles. It is currently equipped with extensive facilities including maintenance hangars, simulation and training centers, command-and-control (C2) systems, workshops, and engineering centres. The base also operates as a command and operational hub for Saudi Arabia's Integrated Air and Missile Defence System, providing missile defence in Riyadh and surrounding central regions. All of these installations in King Salman Air Base are intended to improve the combat readiness of the RSAF under the broader Saudi Vision 2030.

== Facilities ==
King Salman Air Base is classified as Aerodrome Category 9 (CAT 9) for aircraft rescue and fire fighting, which corresponds to a high level of fire and rescue capability. It is serviced by seven major foam tenders, one fire command vehicle, one forward command vehicle, one water tanker, and one rescue stair vehicle. Fuel and oil types available at the base include Jet A-1, Avgas, and JP-8, all supplied via on-site tankers. Meteorological services are provided by the Riyadh MET Office, which supplies real-time weather information to air traffic control, while Terminal Aerodrome Forecasts (TAFs) are prepared by the Jeddah Central Forecast Office.

King Salman Air Base is currently serviced by two parallel runways, with runway 02R/20L being the longest out of the two. Runway 02L is designated as "Charlie", runway 20R as "Bravo", runway 02R as "Delta", and runway 20L as "Alpha". Runway 02L/20R is paved with concrete and asphalt, with runway strength classified as PCN 80/F/A/W/T. The usable runway length measuring 3,301 meters long and 40 meters wide, runway strip measuring 3,421 meters long and 280 meters wide, and Runway End Safety Area (RESA) measuring 240 meters long and 150 meters wide on both ends. Runway 02R/20L is paved with concrete and asphalt, with runway strength also classified as PCN 80/F/A/W/T. The usable runway length measuring 4,000 meters long and 40 meters wide, runway strip measuring 4,120 meters long and 280 meters wide, and RESA measuring 300 meters long and 150 meters wide on both ends. There are a total of 23 asphalt taxiways, which includes taxiways A, A1, A2, A3, A4, A5, A6, B, B1, B2, B3, C, C1, C2, C3, C4, D, G, G1, G2, G3, G4, and G5. The majority of which measures 26 meters wide, while taxiway B2 measures 39 meters wide, B1 and B3 both measuring 36 meters wide, and taxiway D only measuring 15 meters wide. There is one main apron and one helipad apron, both of which are paved in concrete and asphalt. The main apron has a total of 51 aircraft stands, designated from 01 to 43, with stands parallel to each-other designated in L or R. The helicopter apron has one helipad and six helicopter stands, designated from H01 to 06.

King Salman Air Base is equipped with a 24-hour operational DVOR/TACAN, assigned ID "KSN". Runways 02L and 02R are equipped with multiple Instrument Landing Systems, which include a Localizer (LOC) and Glideslope (GP). Two Distance Measuring Equipment units (DME) are also installed, with one co-located with the GP for Runway 02L assigned with ID "KSND", and the other co-located with the GP for Runway 02R assigned with ID "ISND".

== See also ==
- List of airports in Saudi Arabia
- Dirab Air Base
- Khasm Alan Air Base
- King Khalid International Airport
- Riyadh Air Base (closed 2021)
