= Eskan Village =

U.S Army military base near Riyadh, Saudi Arabia

- Riyadh, Saudi Arabia

Site information
- Owner: Saudi Arabia

Location
- Coordinates: 24.582°N 46.862°E

Site history
- Built: 1983
- In use: 1990–Present

Garrison information
- Garrison: 879 ESFS, OPM-FSF, OPM-SANG, USMTM

Eskan Village, officially named Eskan Village Compound, is a U.S. military compound located 20 kilometers south-east of Riyadh, Saudi Arabia. The base is home to the United States Military Training Mission in Saudi Arabia (USMTM), Office of the Program Manager Saudi Arabian National Guard Modernization Program (OPM-SANG), the Office of the Program Manager - Facilities Security Force (OPM-FSF), and the Office of the Program Manager Ministry of Interior-Military Assistance Group (MOI-MAG).

== History ==
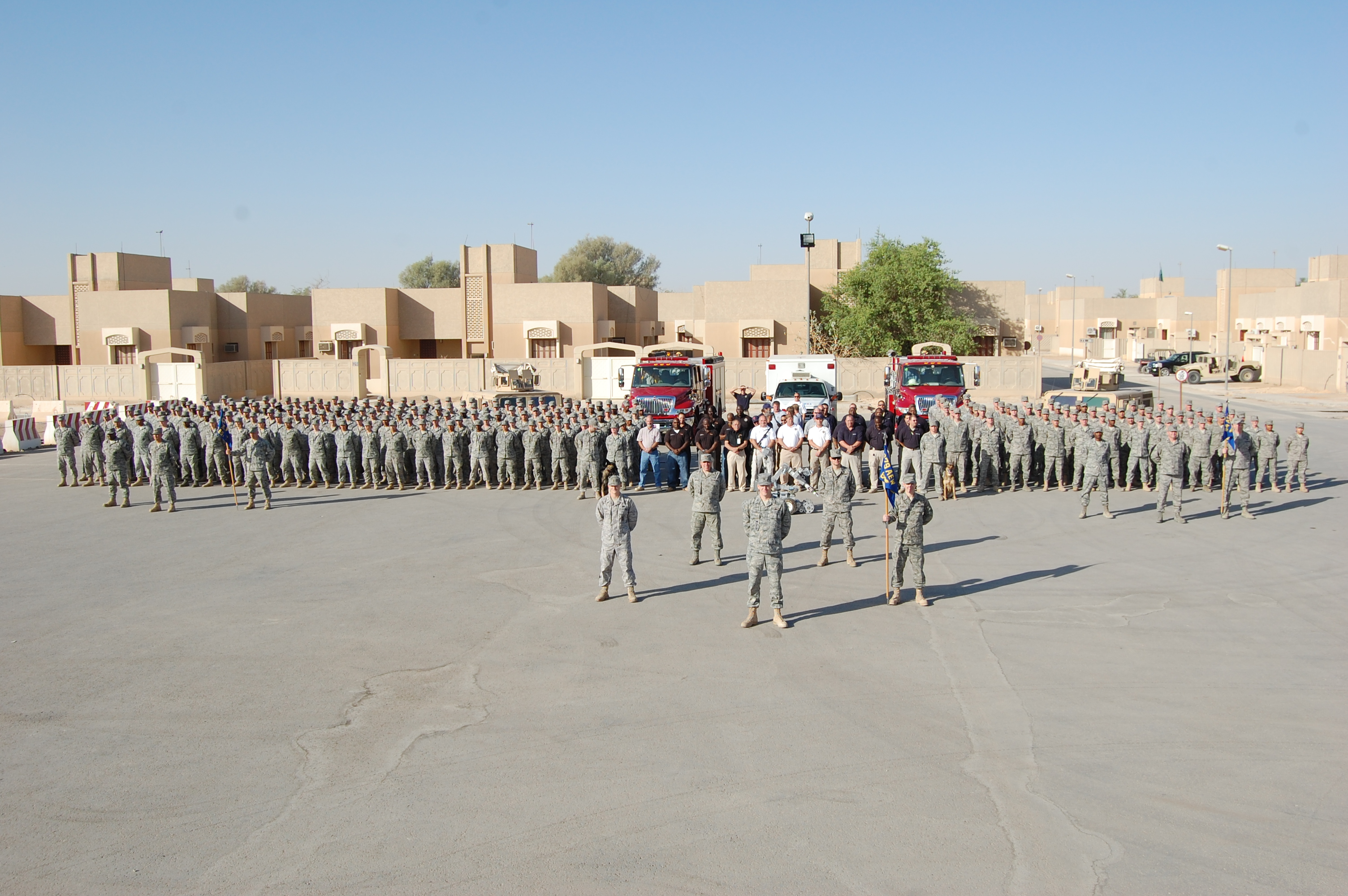
The 64 AEG in November 2010.

Eskan Village was built in 1983 during the reign of Fahd bin Abdulaziz Al Saud to house various bedouin tribes. The tribes declined to occupy the housing complex, and Eskan Village remained unoccupied until August 1990. At that time, the Saudi Arabian government authorized the use of Eskan Village for deployed U.S. servicemembers during Operation Desert Shield and Operation Desert Storm.

In 1992, in the aftermath of the Gulf War, Joint Task Force Southwest Asia (JTF-SWA) was formed and headquartered at Eskan Village for the conduct of Operation Southern Watch. Eskan Village was home to the region's Combined Air Operations Center (CAOC) until it was relocated to Prince Sultan Air Base in September 2001. The transition was accelerated after the events of September 11, 2001.

After the bombing of the Khobar Towers on June 25, 1996, several U.S. military offices and housing facilities located in Riyadh and Dhahran were also moved to Eskan Village and Prince Sultan Air Base to mitigate possible future attacks.

== Force Protection and Operations Support ==
On September 5, 2005, the United States Air Force activated the 64th Air Expeditionary Group to assume security, law enforcement, and operational support for Eskan Village from the United States Army. After nearly nine years, the Air Force inactivated the 64 AEG on May 1, 2014, and transferred these duties to the 879th Expeditionary Security Forces Squadron.

Later, on September 25, 2017, the 379 Expeditionary Mission Support Group facilitated the transfer of security and law enforcement operations from the 879th ESFS to the 341st Military Police Company and inactivated the 879th ESFS.

== See also ==
- Prince Sultan Air Base
