= John G. Hill Jr. =

American army officer (1926–1999)

John Gillespie Hill Jr.
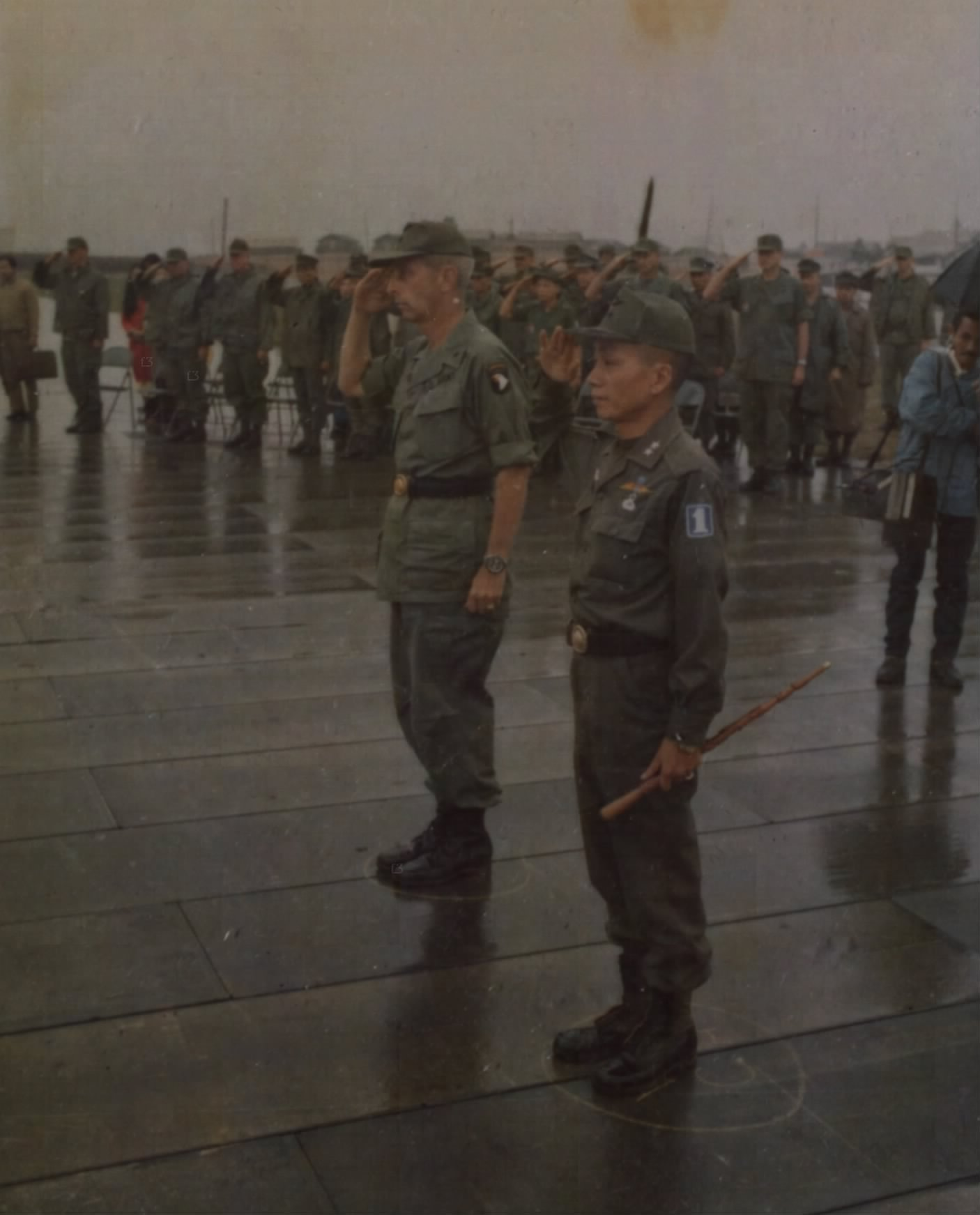
- Brigadier General John G. Hill Jr. and Major General Phạm Văn Phú, Commanding General, 1st Division at the turnover of Camp Eagle, 1972
- Born: 9 August 1926; Plattsburgh, New York, U.S.
- Died: 28 March 1999 (aged 72)
- Burial place: Arlington National Cemetery
- Relatives: John Gillespie Hill (father)
- Military career
- Allegiance: United States
- Branch: United States Army
- Service years: 1946–1978
- Rank: Major General
- Conflicts: Korean War; Vietnam War
- Awards: Distinguished Service Cross; Distinguished Service Medal (2); Legion of Merit (2); Silver Star; Distinguished Flying Cross; Bronze Star (2)

Major General John Gillespie Hill Jr. (9 August 1926 – 28 March 1999) was a United States Army officer who served in the Korean War and the Vietnam War.

== Early life ==
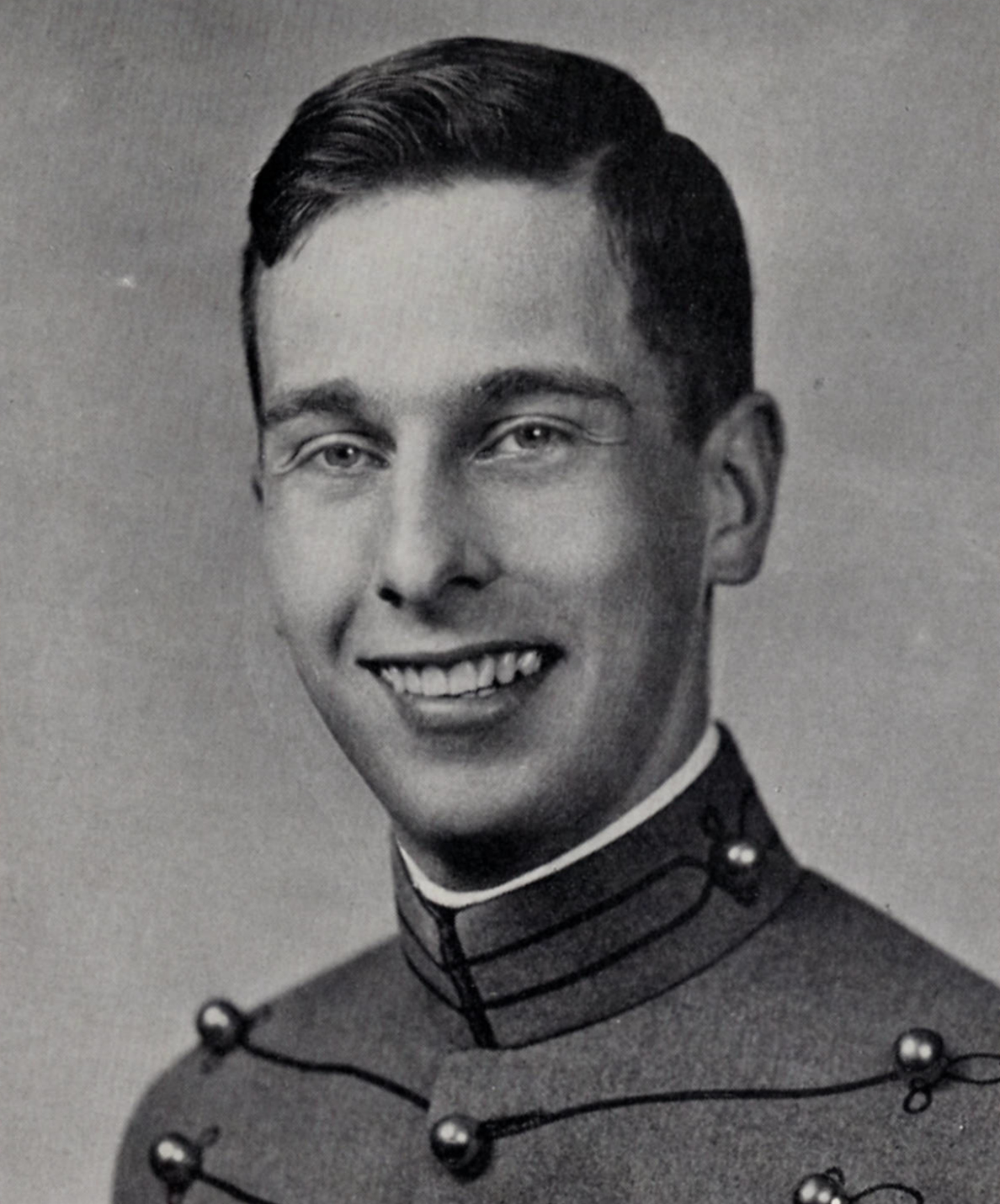
Hill as a United States Military Academy cadet c. 1946

Hill was born in Plattsburgh, New York on 9 August 1926.

His father, Brigadier General John Gillespie Hill, was a United States Army officer.

== Military career ==
He attended the United States Military Academy graduating as a Second Lieutenant in 1946.

During the Korean War he served in the 7th Cavalry Regiment and was awarded the Distinguished Service Cross for his actions on the night of 26/27 September 1950 when he destroyed a T-34 medium tank during the UN September 1950 counteroffensive.

He attended the Armed Forces Staff College in 1959, National War College in 1963 and attended Harvard Business School studying advanced management.

During the Vietnam War he first served as an adviser to the Army of the Republic of Vietnam (ARVN)’s Phuoc Binh Thanh Special Zone and later to the 10th Infantry Division from August 1964 to July 1965.

From June 1968 to October 1969 he served as Executive to the Vice Chief of Staff and as Deputy Secretary of the General Staff (Staff Action Control), Office of the Chief of Staff at The Pentagon. He qualified as an army aviator in 1969.

On his second tour in South Vietnam from July 1970 to May 1971 he served as commander of the 1st Brigade, 5th Mechanized Infantry Division and in this role he was responsible for providing logistical support to the ARVN in Operation Lam Son 719. On 23 March 1971 The New York Times reported he dealt with a combat refusal by men of Troop B, First Squadron, 1st Cavalry Regiment who refused to move to secure a damaged helicopter and their commanding officer's armored vehicle. Hill relieved the Captain of his command, blaming him for losing control of his unit after becoming separated from it. He then served as Assistant Division Commander of the 101st Airborne Division and as commander. During the Easter Offensive of 1972 he was appointed II Corps deputy senior adviser and worked with John Paul Vann in countering the People’s Army of Vietnam forces in the Battle of Kontum.

From September 1973 to February 1975 he served as commander of the U.S. Military Training Mission to Saudi Arabia.

He retired from the Army in 1978 as a Major General.

== Later life ==
Following his retirement from the Army, he qualified as a lawyer at the University of Texas and ran a legal practice in Austin, Texas until the mid-1990s.

He died on 28 March 1999 from brain cancer and is buried at Arlington National Cemetery.

== Decorations ==
His decorations included the Distinguished Service Cross, Distinguished Service Medal (2), Legion of Merit (2), Silver Star, Distinguished Flying Cross and Bronze Star (2)
