= Ministry of National Guard =

Government ministry of Saudi Arabia

- وزارة الحرس الوطني

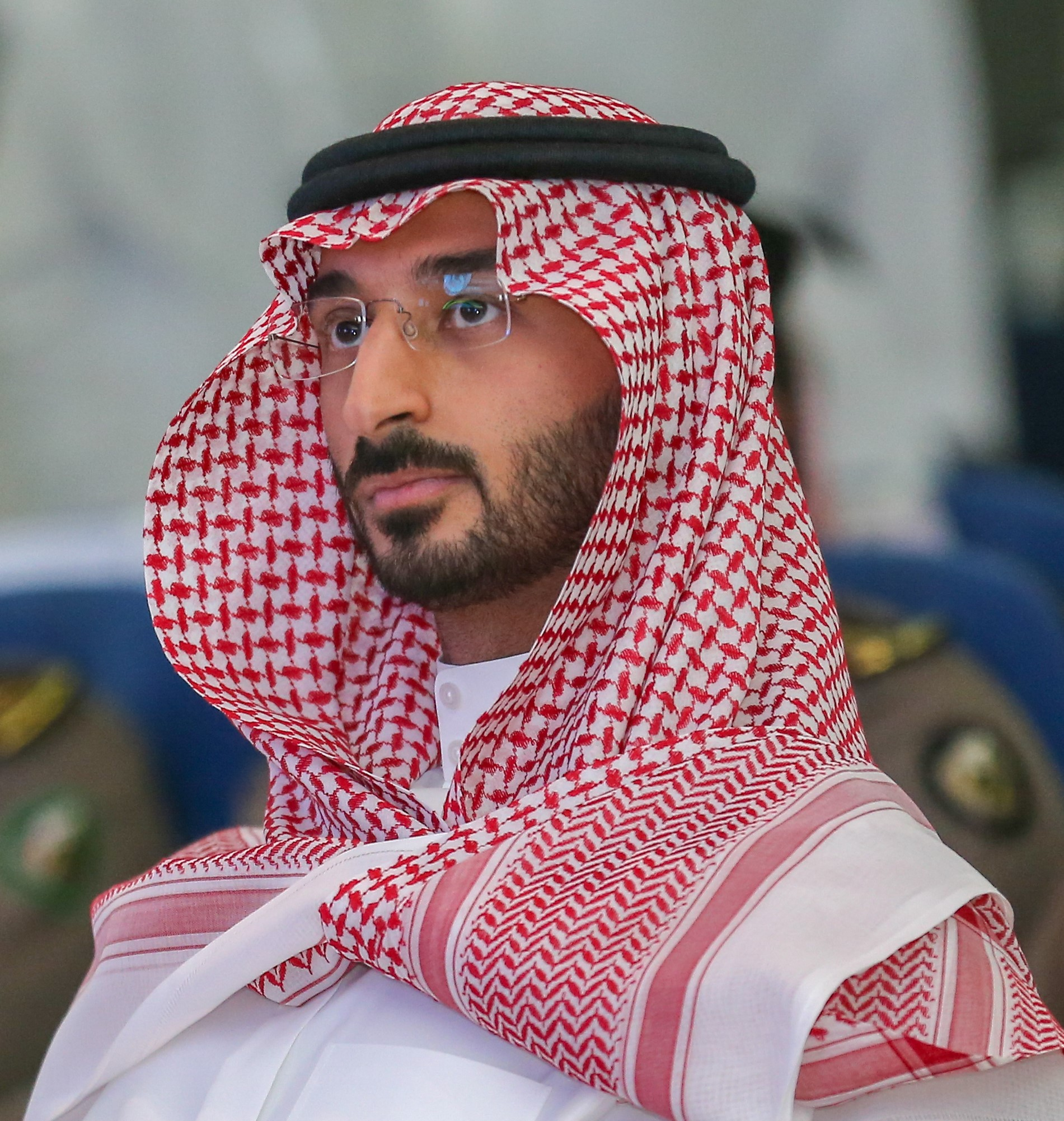
- Abdullah bin Bandar, the current Minister of National Guard since 27 December 2018

Agency overview
- Formed: 27 May 2013; 13 years ago
- Preceding agency: National Guard Presidency (1954 – 2013)
- Jurisdiction: Government of Saudi Arabia
- Headquarters: Riyadh
- Minister responsible: Abdullah bin Bandar
- Website: Official English Site

The Ministry of National Guard (Arabic: وزارة الحرس الوطني) is a government ministry in Saudi Arabia responsible for overseeing the Saudi Arabian National Guard. Established in 2013 to replace the former National Guard Presidency, the ministry manages the administration, development, and operational readiness of the National Guard, which stands as an independent entity and the Kingdom's second major military force alongside the Saudi Arabian Armed Forces.

== List of commanders and ministers ==
No.	Portrait	Commander / Minister	Took office	Left office	Time in office
1		Abdullah bin Faisal	1954	1956	2 years
2		Khalid bin Saud	1956	1961	5 years
3		Saad bin Saud	1961	1962	1 year
4		Abdullah bin Abdulaziz	8 December 1962	17 November 2010	47 years, 344 days
5		Mutaib bin Abdullah	17 November 2010	4 November 2017	6 years, 352 days
6		Khalid bin Ayyaf	4 November 2017	27 December 2018	1 year, 53 days
7		Abdullah bin Bandar	27 December 2018	Incumbent	7 years, 235 days

== See also ==
- Ministries of Saudi Arabia
- Saudi Arabian Military Forces
