= Dirab Air Base =

Air Base in Saudi Arabia

Dirab Air Base Riyadh/Dirab
- Riyadh, Riyadh Governorate in Saudi Arabia

Site information
- Type: Air Base
- Owner: Ministry of National Guard
- Operator: Saudi Arabian National Guard
- Controlled by: 4th Aviation Brigade

Location
- Shown within Saudi Arabia
- Coordinates: 24°28′32″N 46°34′16″E

Site history
- Built: 2017
- In use: 2020 - present

Airfield information
- Elevation: 2,612 metres (8,570 ft) AMSL
Helipads
Number	Length and surface
17/35	790 metres (2,592 ft) Concrete
17L/35R	790 metres (2,592 ft) Concrete
17C/35C	790 metres (2,592 ft) Concrete
17R/35L	790 metres (2,592 ft) Concrete

Dirab Air base is an airbase of the Saudi Arabian National Guard located south west of Riyadh, Riyadh Governorate, Saudi Arabia.

The base is home to the Center of Excellence and Aviation Training Brigade.
