= James C. Riley =

US Army lieutenant general

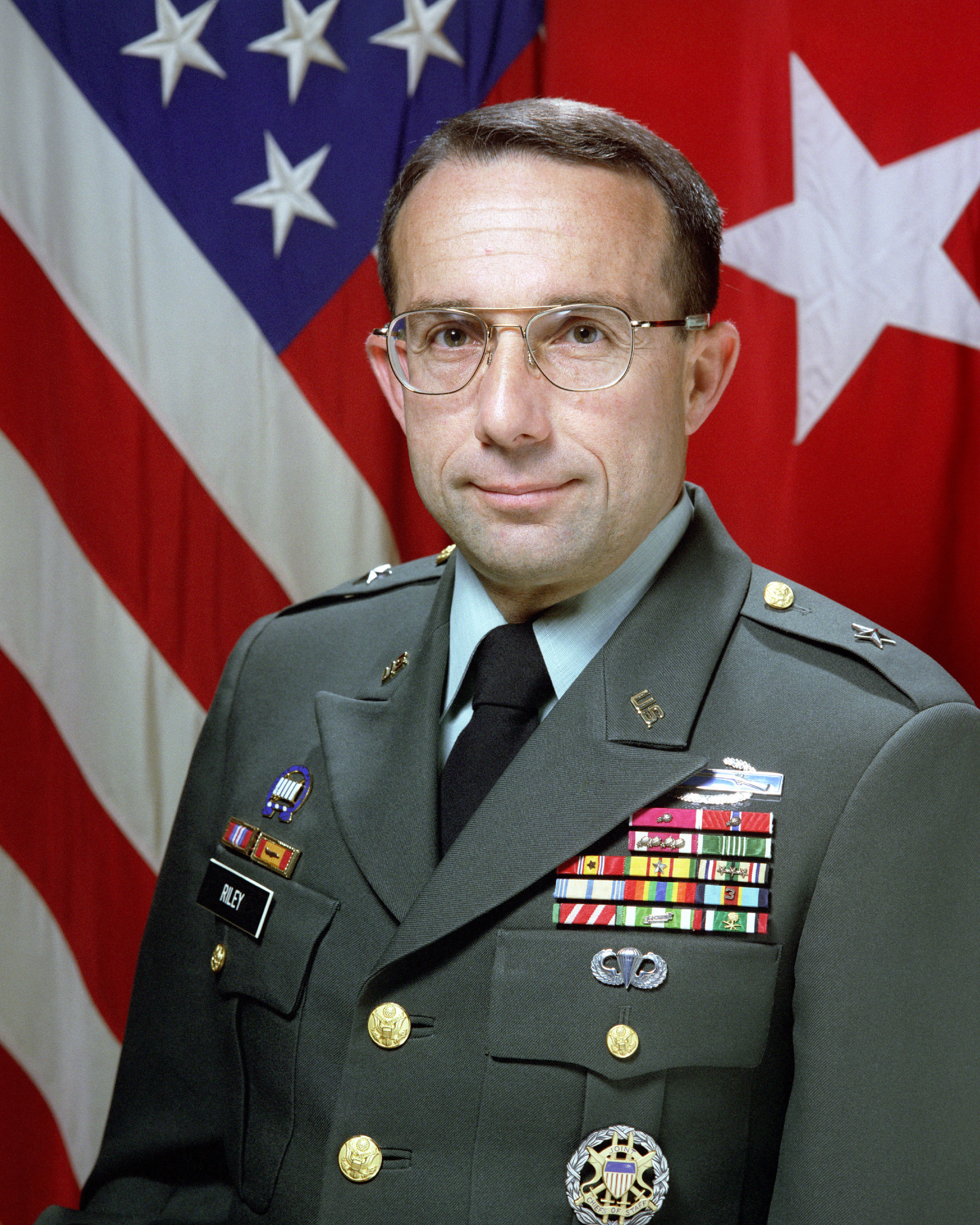
- Riley as a brigadier general in 1994
- Born: 13 November 1946 (age 79); Montebello, California, US
- Education: University of Nebraska–Lincoln; Webster University; United States Army Command and General Staff College; United States Army War College
- Spouse: Linda J. Axtater (m. 1967)
- Military career
- Service: United States Army
- Service years: 1965–2003
- Rank: Lieutenant General
- Unit: U.S. Army Infantry Branch
- Commands: Company B, 9th Battalion, 2nd Training Brigade; Company A, 1st Battalion, 6th Infantry Regiment; 2nd Battalion, 7th Cavalry Regiment; 3rd Brigade, 3rd Infantry Division; United States Military Training Mission – Saudi Arabia; 3rd Infantry Division; V Corps; U.S. Army Combined Arms Center
- Wars: Vietnam War; Gulf War
- Awards: Defense Distinguished Service Medal; Army Distinguished Service Medal; Defense Superior Service Medal; Legion of Merit (2); Bronze Star Medal (2); Meritorious Service Medal (5)
- Other work: Vice President, Raytheon Corporation

James C. Riley (born 13 November 1946) is a retired United States Army officer. A veteran of the Vietnam War and the Gulf War, he served from 1965 to 2003 and attained the rank of lieutenant general. Riley's commands included 2nd Battalion, 7th Cavalry Regiment; 3rd Brigade, 3rd Infantry Division; United States Military Training Mission in Saudi Arabia; 3rd Infantry Division; V Corps; and the U.S. Army Combined Arms Center. His awards and decorations included the Defense Distinguished Service Medal, Defense Superior Service Medal, and two awards of the Legion of Merit.

A native of Montebello, California, Riley was raised and educated in Whittier, California. He was drafted into the United States Army in late 1965, attended Officer Candidate School, and received his commission as a second lieutenant. Riley served as an advisor to a South Vietnamese Army unit during the Vietnam War and continued his career afterward. In 1971, he received a bachelor's degree from the University of Nebraska–Lincoln, and he graduated from the United States Army Command and General Staff College in 1980 and the United States Army War College in 1987. Also in 1987, he also received a master's degree from Webster University.

Riley went on to command 2nd Battalion, 7th Cavalry Regiment, and he commanded 3rd Brigade, 3rd Infantry Division during the Gulf War. His later commands included 3rd Infantry Division, V Corps, and the U.S. Army Combined Arms Center. He retired in 2003, after which he worked as a vice president for Raytheon Corporation.

== Early life ==
James Clifford Riley was born in Montebello, California on 13 November 1946, a son of George R. Riley and Beverly J. (Pearl) Riley. He graduated from La Serna High School in Whittier, California, then attended Fullerton Junior College.

== Start of career ==
Riley was drafted into the United States Army in December 1965. He was selected to attended Officer Candidate School, and he received his commission as a second lieutenant in November 1966. His initial assignment was platoon leader with 2nd Battalion, 505th Infantry Regiment, a unit of the 82nd Airborne Division. He served in the Vietnam War as a member of Advisory Team 99, which provided mentoring and advice to the commander and staff of 4th Battalion, 49th Infantry Regiment, 25th South Vietnamese Division. In 1969, he was posted to Fort Benning, Georgia, where he commanded Company B, 9th Battalion, 2nd Training Brigade.

=== Military education ===
Riley's military education includes:

- Officer Candidate School
- Infantry Officer Advanced Course
- Airborne School
- United States Army Command and General Staff College (1980)
- United States Army War College (1987)

== Continued career ==
In 1971, Riley received a Bachelor of Science degree from the University of Nebraska–Lincoln. Subsequent assignments in West Germany included assistant operations officer (assistant S3) for 4th Battalion, 35th Armor Regiment, commander of Company A, 1st Battalion, 6th Infantry Regiment, logistics staff officer (S-4) for 1st Battalion, 6th Infantry, and maintenance officer for 1-6 Infantry. As his career progressed, Riley's postings included deputy assistant chief of staff for operations (G3) for 1st Armored Division, executive officer of 1st Battalion, 52nd Infantry Regiment; and operations officer (S3) for 3rd Brigade, 1st Armored Division. In 1978, he received a Master of Arts degree from Webster University. From 1983 to 1986 he commanded 2nd Battalion, 7th Cavalry Regiment at Fort Hood, Texas. From 1987 to 1989, he served first as assistant chief of staff for operations (G3) on the staff of 2nd Armored Division, then as the division chief of staff. Riley commanded 3rd Brigade, 3rd Infantry Division in Germany from 1989 to 1990. Riley commanded the brigade in Saudi Arabia and Kuwait during the Gulf War in 1990 and 1991, including Operation Desert Shield and Operation Desert Storm.

Riley's post-Gulf War assignments between 1992 and 1994 included chief of the European division (J-5) on the Joint Staff, Joint Staff representative for European security matters in Washington and Vienna. From 1994 to 1995, he served as the 1st Armored Division's assistant division Commander for support. He was then assigned as chief of the United States Military Training Mission in Saudi Arabia. In 1997, Riley was assigned to command the 3rd Infantry Division at Fort Stewart, Georgia. From 1999 to 2001, Riley commanded V Corps. From 2001 until his August 2003 retirement, he commanded the U.S. Army Combined Arms Center.

After retiring from the military, Riley resided in Marana, Arizona. He was employed by Raytheon Corporation in Tucson, Arizona as vice president of the Land Combat Product Line at Raytheon Missile Systems from 2003 to 2013.

== Awards ==
Riley's awards and decorations include:

- Defense Distinguished Service Medal
- Army Distinguished Service Medal
- Defense Superior Service Medal
- Legion of Merit with 1 oak leaf cluster
- Bronze Star Medal with 2 oak leaf clusters
- Meritorious Service Medal with 4 bronze oak leaf clusters
- Army Commendation Medal
- National Defense Service Medal with 1 bronze service star
- Vietnam Service Medal with 1 silver service star
- Southwest Asia Service Medal with 3 bronze service stars
- Armed Forces Reserve Medal
- Army Service Ribbon
- Army Overseas Service Ribbon with numeral 3
- Vietnam Staff Service Medal
- Vietnam Campaign Medal with 1960 device
- Kuwait Liberation Medal (Kuwait)
- Kuwait Liberation Medal (Saudi Arabia)
- Combat Infantryman Badge
- Parachutist Badge
- Joint Staff Identification Badge

=== Additional honors ===
In 1991, Riley was inducted into the Officer Candidate School Hall of Fame.
