= Vinnell =

American private military company

Vinnell Corporation
- Type: Subsidiary
- Founded: 1931; 95 years ago in Alhambra, California
- Founder: Allan S. Vinnell
- Headquarters: Herndon, Virginia, United States
- Parent: BDM International (1992–1997); TRW Inc. (1997–2002); Northrop Grumman (from 2002)

The Vinnell Corporation is an American private military company based in Herndon, Virginia, United States, specializing in military training, logistics, and support in the form of weapon systems maintenance and management consultancy. Vinnell Corporation is a subsidiary of Northrop Grumman Corporation. They are also party to other joint-venture companies, e.g. Vinnell-Brown & Root (VBR). The Vinnell Corporation was mentioned in Fahrenheit 9/11 for its connections to the Carlyle Group, George W. Bush, and the Saudi Royal family.

They conducted training of portions of the Saudi Arabian National Guard as a joint Saudi/American owned company called Vinnell Arabia since the 1970s. Vinnell Arabia was bombed on May 12, 2003 by Saudi terrorists. Nine employees, including seven Americans and two Filipinos were killed. Another employee was stalked from the military hospital to his home in Riyadh and assassinated on the street.

Vinnell Corporation was given the initial contract to recreate the New Iraqi Army in 2003 by the U.S. Department of Defense. The contract was for nine battalions, with an option to extend the training to 27 battalions. Much of the actual training, however, was subcontracted to Military Professional Resources Inc., Science Applications International Corporation (recruiting stations, with a poster campaign), and smaller firms including Eagle Group International (which appears to have provided medical training), Omega Training Group, and Worldwide Language Resources. There were early indications that the training was not going well; "too much emphasis on classroom studies of strategy and tactics and not enough on basic combat skills.." and later trainees broke when committed to action in Fallujah. As a result, the second phase was taken over by the United States Army.

== History ==
Vinnell Corporation was founded in 1931 in Alhambra, California, by Allan S. Vinnell, as a hauling and excavating contractor. The company grew into construction of roads and buildings and constructed portions of the Pan-American Highway, as well as Dodger Stadium and portions of the Grand Coulee Dam. It had also diversified into production of steel and into mining operations. Vinnell also performed construction for the U.S. Military Assistance Command Vietnam and/or similar Federal Government organizations such as the Navy's Officer in Charge of Construction RVN in Vietnam in the 1960s.

The company moved into operations, maintenance, and training largely in the 1970s. In 1975, the company undertook the Saudi Arabian National Guard Modernization Program. In 1979, it moved into the Job Corps arena with the operation of the Shreveport (LA) center and later operated the Hubert H. Humphrey center in St. Paul, MN; the Roswell (NM) center; the Laredo (TX) center; the Joliet (IL) center; the Gainesville (FL) center; the North Texas (formerly McKinney) center; and the Whitney Young center in Shelbyville, KY.

In 1992, the company was acquired by BDM International, which was in turn acquired by TRW Inc. in 1997. TRW was acquired by Northrop Grumman in 2002.
