= Khasm Alan Air Base =

Khasm Alan Air Base Riyadh/Khasm Alan
- Riyadh, Riyadh Governorate in Saudi Arabia

Site information
- Type: Air Base
- Owner: Ministry of National Guard
- Operator: Saudi Arabian National Guard
- Controlled by: 1st Aviation Brigade

Location
- Shown within Saudi Arabia
- Coordinates: 24°37′19″N 46°55′20″E

Site history
- Built: 2018
- In use: 2018 - present

Airfield information
- Identifiers: ICAO: OEKA
- Elevation: 559 metres (1,834 ft) AMSL
Runways
Direction	Length and surface
16/34	2,100 metres (6,890 ft) Concrete

Khasm Alan Air base (ICAO: OEKA) is an airbase of the Saudi Arabian National Guard located east of Riyadh, Riyadh Governorate, Saudi Arabia.

The base is home to the 1st Aviation Brigade.
