= Charles L. Donnelly Jr. =

United States Air Force general

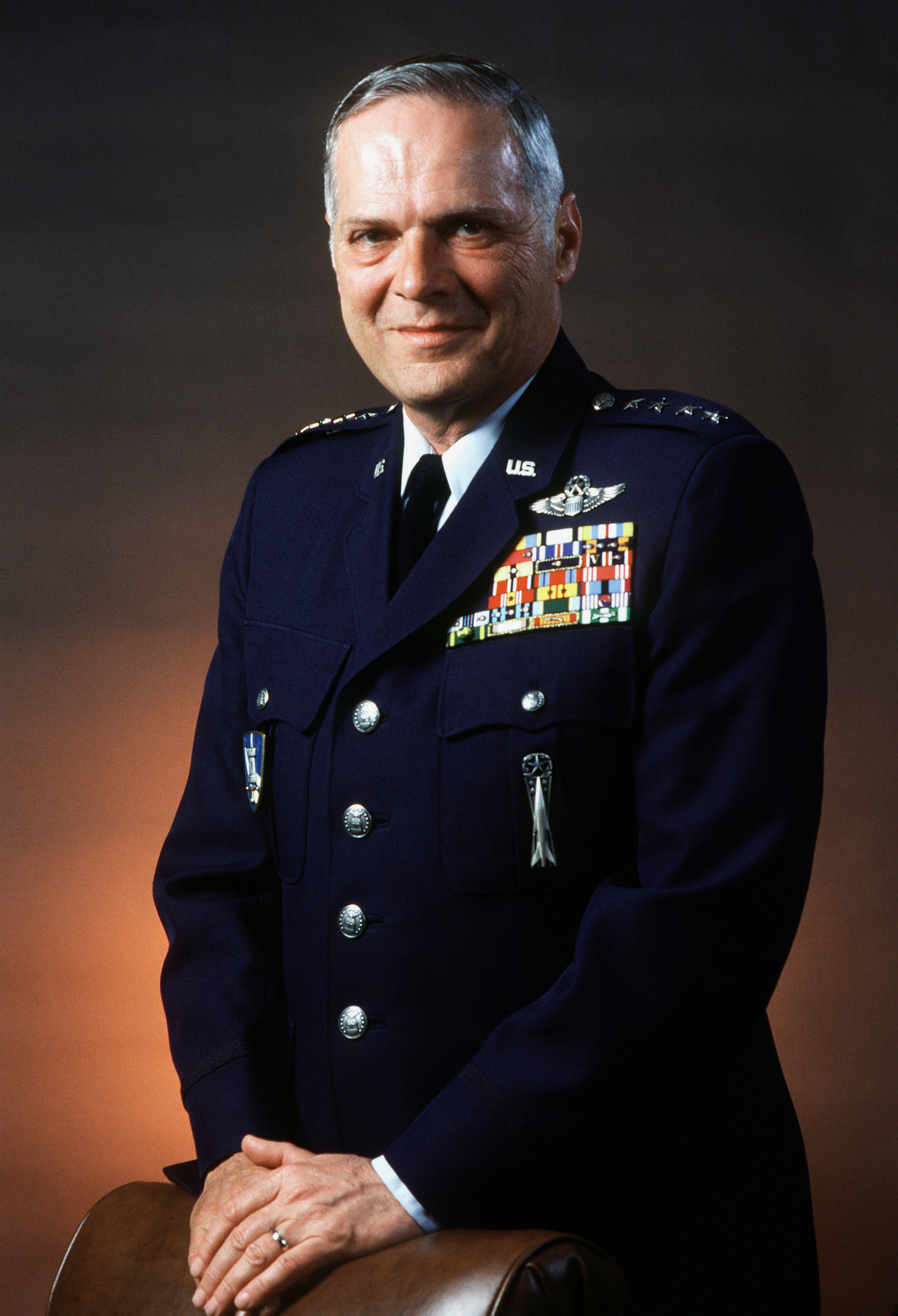
- Born: August 24, 1929; Barberton, Ohio, U.S.
- Died: July 3, 1994 (aged 64); Andrews Air Force Base, Maryland, U.S.
- Burial place: Arlington National Cemetery
- Military career
- Allegiance: United States
- Branch: United States Air Force
- Service years: 1951–1987
- Rank: General
- Commands: United States Air Forces in Europe; Allied Air Forces Central Europe; United States Forces Japan; Fifth Air Force; Sheppard Technical Training Center; 401st Tactical Fighter Wing
- Conflicts: Vietnam War
- Awards: Defense Distinguished Service Medal; Air Force Distinguished Service Medal; Defense Superior Service Medal; Legion of Merit (3); Distinguished Flying Cross

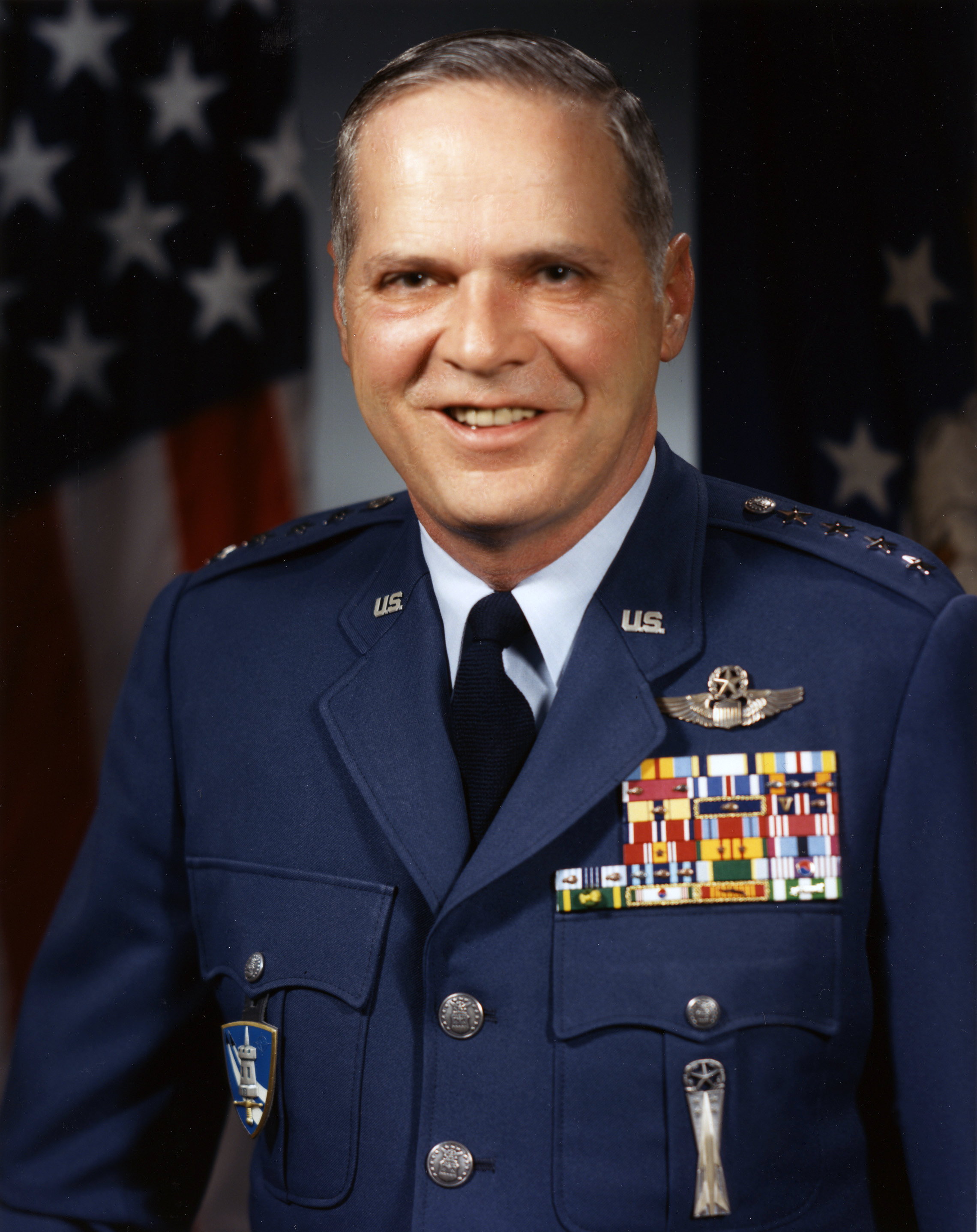
General Charles L. Donnelly Jr.

Charles Lawthers Donnelly Jr. (August 24, 1929 – July 3, 1994) was a general in the United States Air Force who served as Commander in Chief, United States Air Forces in Europe/Commander, Allied Air Forces Central Europe from 1984 to 1987. Donnelly was also a fighter pilot in the Vietnam War. He died of cancer in Malcolm Grow Medical Center at Andrews Air Force Base on July 3, 1994, at the age of 64.

== Personal life and education ==
Donnelly was born in Barberton, Ohio. He was the brother of Susan Hatfield of Canal Winchester, Ohio, and Margaret Bischoff of Antioch, Illinois. He married Carolyn Vandersall Donnelly and had a daughter with her: Linda D. Wieland.

Donnelly graduated from Otterbein College in Westerville, Ohio, in 1950. He then joined the United States Air Force (USAF) as an aviation cadet. He gained a master's degree in public administration from George Washington University and graduated from the Squadron Officer School, the Air Command and Staff College, the Air War College, and the Royal College of Defense Studies in London, UK. Donnelly had more than 8,000 hours of flight time in 38 types of aircraft.

== Military career ==
In the 1950s Donnelly flew F-51 Mustang and F-86 Sabre fighter aircraft for the 431st Fighter-Interceptor Squadron at Selfridge Air Force Base in Michigan and what was then Wheelus Air Base in Libya. Following assignments as an instructor, operations officer and aide-de-camp, he was stationed with the 555th Tactical Fighter Squadron at the Ubon Royal Thai Air Force Base in 1966. He flew 100 combat missions over North Vietnam and 27 over Laos. After that he was stationed at USAF headquarters in Washington, DC. He was then posted as chief of the United States Military Training Mission to Saudi Arabia, prior to assuming command of the Fifth Air Force and United States Forces Japan at Yokota Air Base. He was in charge of U.S. forces both in Japan and South Korea. He was then posted to Ramstein Air Base, West Germany to become commander of United States Air Forces in Europe and Allied Air Forces Central Europe from 1984 to 1987.

Donnelly received awards throughout his military activity including the following: Defense Distinguished Service Medal, Air Force Distinguished Service Medal, Defense Superior Service Medal, Legion of Merit with two oak leaf clusters, Distinguished Flying Cross, and Air Medal with 12 oak leaf clusters.
