= Abdulaziz al-Fagham =

Saudi Arabian major general

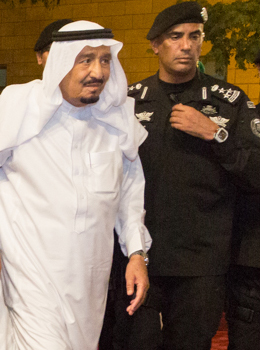
- Abdulaziz Al-Fagham (right) with King Salman bin Abdulaziz (left) in Riyadh, in May 2017

Personal Bodyguard of the King of Saudi Arabia
- In office 2005–2019
- Monarch: Abdullah of Saudi Arabia; Salman of Saudi Arabia

Personal details
- Born: 20 July 1971 As Suairah, Saudi Arabia
- Died: 28 September 2019 (aged 48) Jeddah, Saudi Arabia
- Education: King Khalid Military College

Military service
- Allegiance: Saudi Arabia
- Branch/service: Saudi Royal Guard Regiment
- Rank: Major General

Abdulaziz bin Badah Al-Fagham Al-Mutairi (Arabic: عبد العزيز بن بداح الفغم المطيري; 20 July 1971 – 28 September 2019) was the personal bodyguard of King Salman bin Abdulaziz, as well as the bodyguard of the late King Abdullah bin Abdulaziz. He was also the Commander of the Saudi Royal Guard's Special Guard Force. Al-Fagham was well known among Saudis, who referred to him as the "honest guard" and "guardian angel" due to his strong commitment.

== Early life and education ==
Abdulaziz al-Fagham was born on 20 July 1971, in the city of As Suairah, located in the Eastern Province of Saudi Arabia. He lived in the city until completing secondary school. He subsequently enrolled in the Ministry of National Guard's King Khalid Military College in 1989, and graduated in 1991. Al-Fagham also received training in the Thunderbolt, which qualified him to protect the country's most prominent figures through personal security, as well as other training courses in securing important figures.

== Career ==
During King Abdullah bin Abdulaziz's reign, Al-Fagham was appointed to the Special Brigade by the Saudi National Guard, then transferred to the royal guard, where he worked as a liaison officer in the king's convoys. Al-Fagham was recognized for his dedication to late King Abdullah bin Abdulaziz, with whom he worked for nearly ten years, rising through the ranks to become the king's bodyguard. Because of his excellent professional abilities, quick wit, and good behavior, King Salman appointed him as his bodyguard. Additionally, in 2017, he was elevated from brigadier general to major general.

== Personal life ==
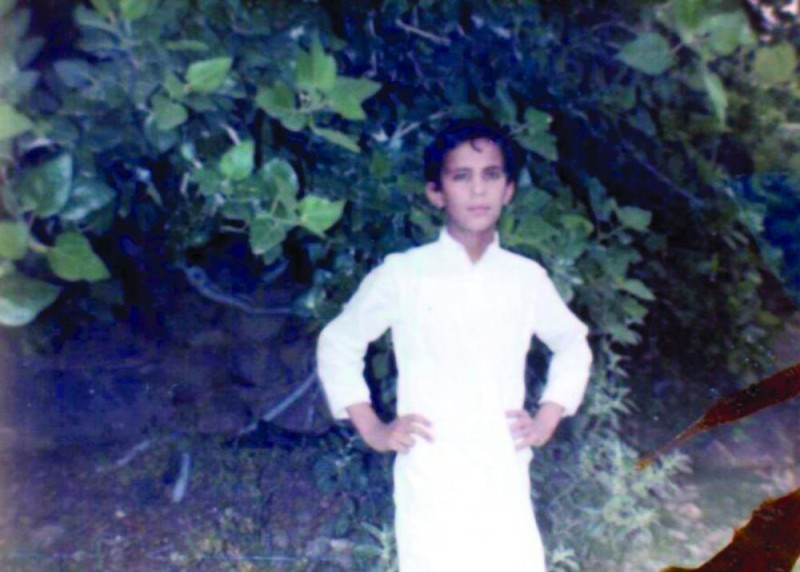
Picture taken of Abdulaziz al-Fagham as a child in the late 1970s

General Abdulaziz's father, Badah Abdullah Al-Fagham, worked as a personal escort for King Abdullah for 30 years. He is the third of his brothers, Talal, Nawwaf, Abdullah, Badr and Saud. Al-Fagham has two sons and a daughter: Abdullah, Nawaf and Rima.

== Death and funeral ==
General Abdulaziz was killed by Saudi Mamdouh Al Ali, came by, and an altercation erupted over an old personal issue. Al Ali left the house then came back with a weapon, and fired shots which struck Al-Fagham. The houseowner’s brother and a Filipino houseworker were also injured. Ali was eventually killed in a shootout with security forces, in which five officials were injured, according to the SPA.

Al-Fagham was later taken to King Faisal Specialist Hospital in Jeddah, but succumbed to his injuries. Funeral prayers were held at Masjid al-Haram in Mecca and he was buried in the Cemetery of the Haram Martyrs in Al-Sharaa on 29 September 2019.

== Public reaction to death ==
According to Al-Arabiya English, "Saudi Twitter activity skyrocketed following news of the death of King Salman's personal bodyguard Major General Abdulaziz al-Faghm, making his name in Arabic the number one worldwide trend on the social media platform."

Additionally, Saudi authorities turned to social media to pay tribute to General al-Fagham, including health minister Tawfiq al-Rabiah, who said: 'Oh God, have mercy on him and make a great rest in paradise and honor his home and inspired his family and his patience and solace. . Guard our kings and dwell our hearts.' 'You are with me on the phone today and laugh and talk about Riyadh,' Royal Court adviser Turki al-Sheikh tweeted. God bless you for your kindness. O Abu Abdullah, God... God be praised, and may he fulfill his destiny... I don't think you realize that I won't be seeing you after today!'

== Memorials and legacy ==
Prince Faisal bin Bandar bin Abdulaziz, the governor of Riyadh, authorized a proposal to rename a street in Riyadh after Major General Abdulaziz Al-Fagham on 9 October 2019. This decision was made to show appreciation for his service to the leadership and the country.
