= Office of the Program Manager, Saudi Arabian National Guard Modernization Program =

Office of the Program Manager, Saudi Arabian National Guard Modernization Program (OPM-SANG)
- Active: 1973 –
- Country: United States
- Branch: United States Army
- Type: Security Assistance Organization (SAO)
- Part of: United States Army Security Assistance Command
- Headquarters: Eskan Village, Riyadh, Saudi Arabia
- Nickname: OPM-SANG / OPM
- Website: Official Website

Commanders
- Program Manager (PM): COL D. Alan McKewan

The Office of the Program Manager, Saudi Arabian National Guard Modernization Program (OPM-SANG or just OPM for short) is a Security Assistance Organization of the United States Army with the primary mission of managing the modernization effort of the Saudi Arabian National Guard (SANG).

The United States provides technical and contract supervisory support to SANG through functions such as organization, training, equipment, procurement, construction, maintenance, supply, administration, and medical programs.

All aspects of SANG's force expansion have direct involvement from OPM personnel with the goal of developing a total army.

The head of OPM, the Program Manager (PM), exercises principal authority over the planning, direction, execution, and control of the SANG modernization effort. This effort covers all elements, missions, functions, and requirements of SANG. The PM facilitates the increased participation of SANG in all aspects of the program with the goal of SANG eventually having the capability to unilaterally initiate and sustain modern organizations and systems.

== History ==
OPM-SANG was established in 1973 in an agreement signed by then Saudi Arabian Crown Prince Abdullah bin Abdul Aziz Al-Saud and the U.S. Ambassador to the Kingdom of Saudi Arabia in response to a request from former King Faisal bin Abdul Aziz. The contract to modernize the Saudi Arabian National Guard was awarded in 1975 to Vinnell Corporation.

From 1975 to 1983, OPM helped SANG to organize, equip, and train a separate infantry brigade consisting of four combined arms battalions mounted on V-150 armored vehicles, an artillery battalion, a direct support Logistics Support Battalion (LSB), an engineering company, and a signal company. Additionally, a general support logistics base, Logistics Base Command (LBC), and the National Guard Military School (NGMS) were established. A second infantry brigade was modernized and continued efforts in the NGMS and LBC occurred from 1982 to 1987.

OPM began a medical modernization program under a second Memorandum of Understanding (MOU) in 1981. Hospital Corporation of America operated the 500-bed acute care facility for SANG in Riyadh under OPM supervision from 1982 to 1987. SANG assumed responsibility for supervision of the contractor in 1987 with OPM acting as an advisor.

OPM managed the sustainment of the two mechanized brigades while continuing to develop the logistics base and school system infrastructure from 1988 to 1990. Additionally, OPM began to advise the SANG National Headquarters, organized a new signal battalion, organized three new field medical companies, and advised the SANG Special Battalion, facilities engineers, and data processing activities.

=== Incidents ===
On Monday, 13 November 1995, a car bomb exploded outside the OPM-SANG headquarters in Riyadh, killing six Americans and two Indians and wounding about 70 others. The attack occurred six months prior to the Khobar Towers bombing, which killed 19 Americans. Both bombings have been attributed to Hezbollah Al-Hejaz.

In September 2018, a U.S. Army pilot died while training a Saudi student pilot on the AH-6i light attack helicopter at the Khashm Al An Airfield in Riyadh. An investigation obtained by Army Times found that the U.S. military was supplying aviators to help staff a Boeing contract that the defense company was not fulfilling. The investigation determined that OPM allowed for "mission creep" to help train Saudi pilots as operations along the Yemen-Saudi border ramped up, expanding its flight instruction to the AH-6i "to fill a Boeing contractual void."

== See also ==
- United States Military Training Mission (USMTM)
