= King Khalid Military College =

Military university in Riyadh, Saudi Arabia

King Khalid Military Academy
- Type: Military University
- Established: 2 May 1965; 59 years ago
- Rector: Muhammad bin Marzouq Al-Habbabi
- Location: Riyadh, Saudi Arabia; 24°44′28″N 46°53′19″E
- Website: kkma.edu.sa
- Location in Saudi Arabia

King Khalid Military Academy (Arabic: كلية الملك خالد العسكرية) is a military university in Saudi Arabia owned by the Government of Saudi Arabia. It is located at Riyadh.

Khalid Military College was founded in 1965 based on the Royal Decree. It was officially under the Custodian of the Two Holy Mosques King Abdullah bin Abdulaziz and King Fahd, with aim of training and preparing officers of the National Guard operation.

== Notable alumni ==
- Mutaib bin Abdullah, a member of House of Saud who served as the Minister of the National Guard from 2013 to 2017.
- Abdulaziz al-Fagham, the former personal bodyguard of King Salman bin Abdulaziz, as well as the bodyguard of the late King Abdullah bin Abdulaziz from 2005 to 2019.

== Sources ==
- Gazzāz, Hassan 'Abd-al-Hayy (1992). The Security We Enjoy. H.A.H. Gazzaz.
