= United States Military Training Mission =

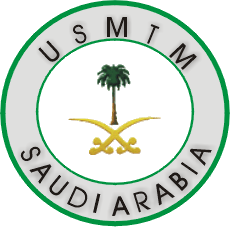
- Emblem of the United States Military Training Mission.
- Active: 1953–present
- Country: United States
- Type: Security Assistance Organization (SAO)
- Part of: Riyadh, Saudi Arabia
- Nickname: USMTM (pronounced "yuce-a-MIT-em")

Commanders
- Chief: Colonel Dirk H. Smith, Jr.

The United States Military Training Mission (USMTM) to the Kingdom of Saudi Arabia is a Security Assistance Organization (SAO) which manages and is primarily funded by Foreign Military Sales (FMS) cases between the United States Government and the Kingdom of Saudi Arabia. USMTM was the result of a meeting between King Abdul Aziz and United States President Franklin D. Roosevelt at Great Bitter Lake.

== Mission ==
USMTM coordinates security assistance efforts to train, advise, and assist the Saudi Arabian Armed Forces in building defense capacity/capability through military exercises and professional military education in order to promote regional security and to protect common interests of the United States of America and the Kingdom of Saudi Arabia while strengthening strategic partnership.

USMTM Goals

To maintain and enhance the strategic partnership between the KSA and the USA.

To train, advise, and assist the Saudi Arabian Armed Forces (SAAF) to:

- Develop and evolve strategic plans and policy.
- Conduct Joint and Coalition operations and exercises.
- Maintain interoperability among SAAF, the U.S., and mutual regional partners.
- Institutionalize the Professional Military Education program.
- Measure readiness for sustainment and modernization of the force.

USMTM is a Joint Command composed of officers and enlisted personnel from the Army, Navy, Air Force and Marine Corps. The head of USMTM carries the title of "Chief" and is also designated the senior U.S. Defense Representative (USDR) for the Kingdom of Saudi Arabia. USMTM is the primary liaison between U.S. Armed Forces and the Saudi Arabian Ministry of Defense and Aviation (MODA), the Saudi counterpart to the American Joint Chiefs of Staff.

Within USMTM there are six divisions, each who interfaces with a Saudi counterpart:

- Joint Advisory Division (JAD): interfaces with the Ministry of Defense and Aviation (MODA).
- Land Forces Division (LFD): interfaces with the Royal Saudi Land Forces (RSLF).
- Naval Forces Division (NFD): interfaces with the Royal Saudi Naval Forces (RSNF).
- Air Force Division (AFD): interfaces with the Royal Saudi Air Force (RSAF).
- Marine Forces Division (MFD): interfaces with the Royal Saudi Marine Forces (RSFMF) component of the Royal Saudi Naval Forces.
- Air and Missile Division (AMD): interfaces with the Royal Saudi Air Defense Forces (RSADF).

Chain of Command

USMTM is a joint training mission and functional component command under the military command of the USCENTCOM, MacDill Air Force Base, Florida. USMTM's mission is to advise and assist the Saudi Arabian armed forces through security cooperation efforts in developing, training and sustaining capable deterrent and self-defense forces for Saudi Arabia in order to facilitate regional security. The mission of USMTM directly supports USCENTCOM's theater strategy to shape, respond and prepare, through forward presence, bilateral and multilateral exercise programs, security assistance activities, and foreign military sales.

Both military and civilian personnel assigned to USMTM are under the sponsorship of the U.S. State Department and the Saudi Arabian Ministry Defense and Aviation and are classified as non-combatants under Title 22 of the United States Code.

== History ==
The 1951 Mutual Defense Assistance Agreement and the 1977 Accords (known as the USMTM Agreement) formed and governs the basis and function of USMTM in Saudi Arabia. USMTM was formally established on 27 June 1953 and is still a fundamental component of the US/Saudi military relationship.

== The Chiefs of USMTM ==
Service	Name	Dates	Biography
(AF)	Brig Gen Richard J. O'Keefe	(APR 1949 – JAN 1951)	
(AF)	Brig Gen Edwin M. Day	(JAN 1951 – SEP 1952)	
(AF)	Brig Gen Orrin L. Grover	(JUN 1952 – APR 1955)	
(AF)	Brig Gen George F. Schlatter	(APR 1955 – AUG 1956)	
(AF)	Col Frederick J. Sutterlin	(SEP 1956 – JUL 1957)	
(AF)	Brig Gen Dale O. Smith	(JUL 1957 – NOV 1957)	
(AF)	Brig Gen Albert P. Clark	(NOV 1957 – JUL 1959)	
(AF)	Brig Gen James C. McGehee	(JUL 1959 – JUL 1961)	
(AF)	Col Williard W. Wilson	(SEP 1961 – SEP 1964)	
(A)	BG Osmund A. Leahy	(SEP 1964 – AUG 1966)	
(A)	BG Ward S. Ryan	(AUG 1966 – OCT 1967)	
(A)	BG Jerry S. Addington	(OCT 1967 – AUG 1969)	
(A)	BG Donald D. Dunlop	(AUG 1969 – JUL 1971)	
(A)	BG Olin E. Smith	(SEP 1971 – SEP 1973)	
(A)	BG John G. Hill Jr.	(SEP 1973 – FEB 1975)	
(AF)	Brig Gen James G. Ahmann	(MAR 1975 – JUL 1977)	
(AF)	Maj Gen Charles H. Cathey, Jr.	(JUL 1977 – JUL 1979)	
(AF)	Maj Gen Charles L. Donnelly Jr.	(JUL 1979 – JUL 1981)	
(AF)	Maj Gen Neil L. Eddins	(JUL 1981 – JUL 1983)	
(AF)	Maj Gen Spence M. Armstrong	(JUL 1983 – JUL 1985)	
(AF)	Maj Gen Russell L. Violett	(JUL 1985 – MAY 1987)	
(AF)	Maj Gen John R. Farrington	(MAY 1987 – JUL 1989)	
(AF)	Maj Gen Donald L. Kaufman	(JUL 1989 – AUG 1991)	
(A)	MG Thomas G. Rhame	(AUG 1991 – AUG 1993)	
(A)	MG William M. Boice	(AUG 1993 – OCT 1995)	
(A)	MG James C. Riley	(OCT 1995 – JUN 1997)	
(A)	MG John J. Marcello	(JUN 1997 – JUN 2000)	
(AF)	Maj Gen Silas R. Johnson, Jr.	(JUN 2000 – OCT 2001)	
(AF)	Maj Gen Michael N. Farage	(OCT 2001 – AUG 2003)	
(A)	COL Jack D. Humphrey, Jr (Acting Chief)	(AUG 2003 – OCT 2003)	
(AF)	Maj Gen Larry L. Twitchell	(OCT 2003 – NOV 2006)	
(A)	MG Rhett A. Hernandez	(NOV 2006 – MAR 2009)	
(AF)	Maj Gen Paul M. Van Sickle	(MAR 2009 – MAR 2011)	
(USMC)	Col Jay L. Huston (Acting Chief)	(MAR 2011 – JUL 2011)	
(AF)	Maj Gen David L. Commons	(JUL 2011 – JUL 2013)	
(AF)	Maj Gen Thomas P. Harwood III	(JUL 2013 – JUL 2015)	
(A)	MG Peter D. Utley	(JUL 2015 – AUG 2018 )	
(A)	COL Robert E. Lee Magee	(SEP 2018 – AUG 2019)	
(A)	COL Brad T. Gandy	(AUG 2019 – AUG 2021)	
(USSF)	COL Vance "Jolly" Goodfellow	(AUG 2021 – MAY 2022)	
(N)	Capt Sherry Wangwhite	(MAY 2022 – MAY 2023)	
(A)	COL Jerel Evans	(JUL 2023 – JUL 2024)	
(A)	COL Dirk H. Smith, Jr.	(AUG 2024 – AUG 2025)	
(A)	COL Lee S. Wallace	(AUG 2025 – PRESENT)	

(A) = Army, (AF) = Air Force, (N) = Navy, (USMC) = Marine Corps, (USSF) = Space Force

== See also ==
- Dhahran Airfield
- Ministry of Defense and Aviation
- Office of the Program Manager, Saudi Arabian National Guard Modernization Program (OPM-SANG)
