= Abdullah bin Bandar Al Saud =

Saudi Arabian politician (born 1986)

- عبدالله بن بندر آل سعود
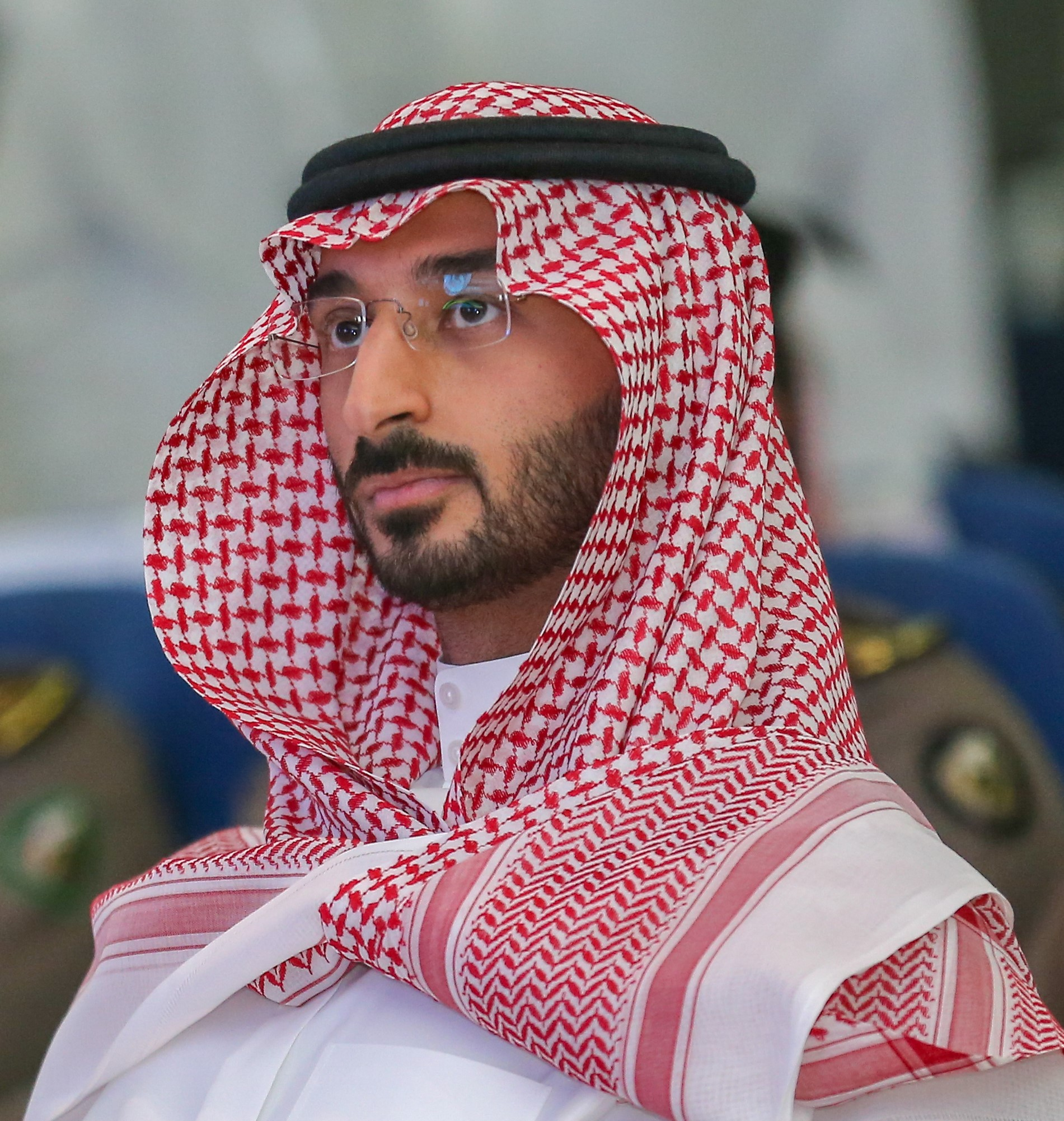
- Abdullah in 2018

Minister of the National Guard
- Incumbent
- Assumed office 27 December 2018
- Monarch: Salman
- Prime Minister: Salman (2018–2022); Mohammad bin Salman (2022–present)
- Preceded by: Khalid bin Abdulaziz bin Mohammed bin Ayyaf Al Muqrin

Personal details
- Born: 7 August 1986 (age 40) Riyadh, Saudi Arabia
- Parent: Bandar bin Abdulaziz Al Saud (father)
- Education: King Saud University

Abdullah bin Bandar bin Abdulaziz Al Saud (Arabic: عبدالله بن بندر بن عبدالعزيز آل سعود; born 7 August 1986) is the Minister of National Guard in Saudi Arabia. He was appointed to the post on 27 December 2018. He is a member of the House of Saud and one of the grandsons of Saudi's founder King Abdulaziz.

== Early life and education ==
Abdullah bin Bandar was born on 7 August 1986. He is a son of Prince Bandar bin Abdulaziz Al Saud. He received a bachelor's degree in business administration from King Saud University in Riyadh.

== Career ==
He served as the deputy head of department of the King Salman Youth Center. He was deputy governor of Makkah region between April 2017 and December 2018. On 27 December 2018, he was named as the minister of National Guard, succeeding Khalid bin Abdulaziz bin Mohammed bin Ayyaf Al Muqrin in the post.

== Personal life ==
Prince Abdullah is married to Karima Khalid Al Ibrahim.
