= Mutaib bin Abdullah Al Saud =

Saudi royal, military officer, and former government official (born 1952)

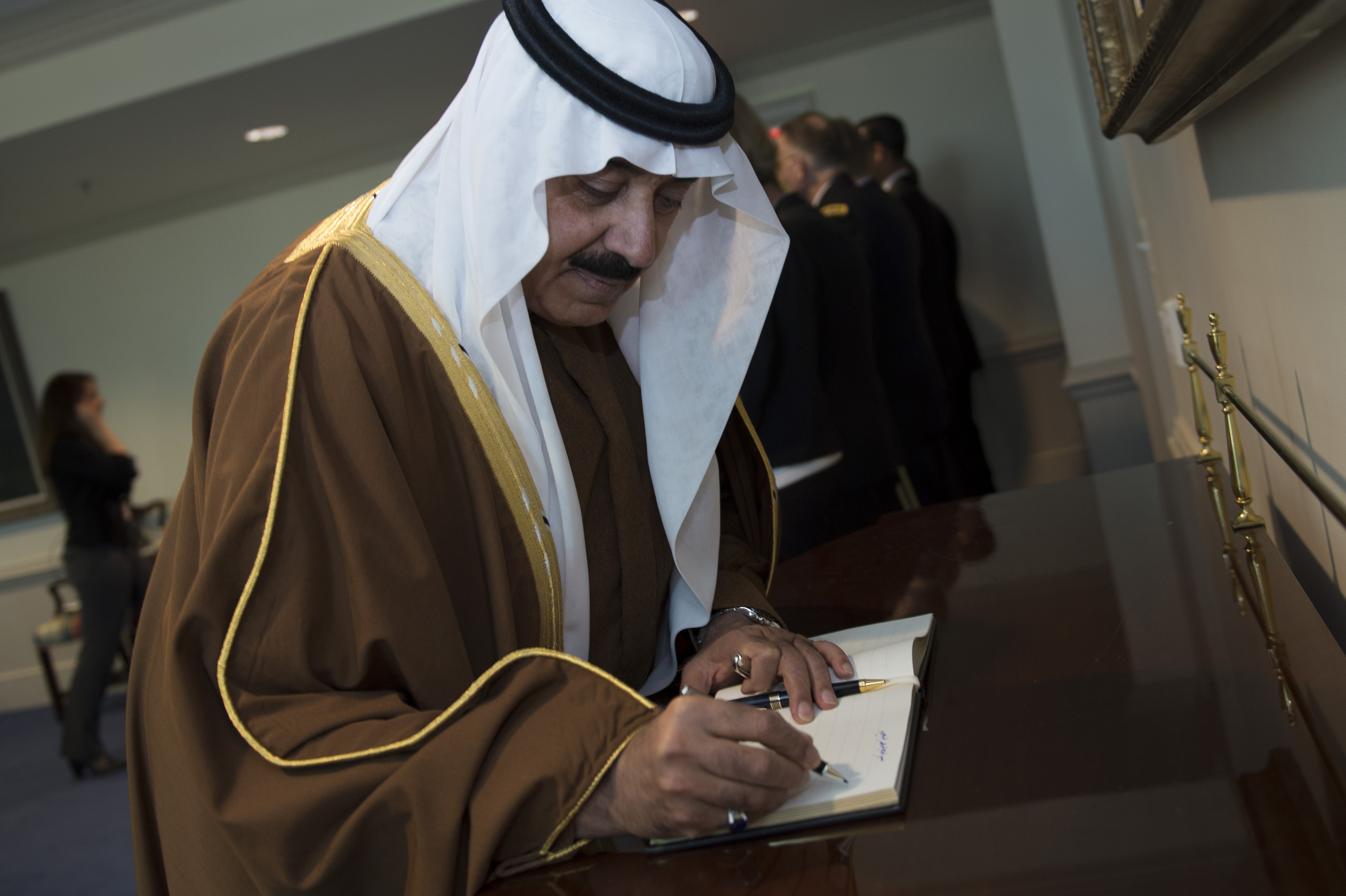
- Prince Mutaib at The Pentagon in 2014

Minister of National Guard
- In office 27 May 2013 – 4 November 2017
- Monarchs: Abdullah; Salman
- Prime Minister: King Abdullah; King Salman
- Preceded by: Office established
- Succeeded by: Khalid bin Abdulaziz bin Mohammed bin Ayyaf Al Muqrin

Chief of the National Guard
- In office 17 November 2010 – 27 May 2013
- Monarch: Abdullah
- Prime Minister: King Abdullah
- Preceded by: Abdullah bin Abdulaziz Al Saud
- Succeeded by: Office abolished

Personal details
- Born: 26 March 1952 (age 74) Riyadh, Saudi Arabia
- Spouse: Princess Jawahir bint Abdullah bin Abdul Rahman
- Children: 6
- Alma mater: Sandhurst Military Academy; King Khalid Military College
- Names: Mutaib bin Abdullah bin Abdulaziz Al Saud
- House: House of Saud
- Parents: King Abdullah bin Abdulaziz (father); Munira bint Mohammed bin Abdullah Al Otaishan (mother)

Mutaib bin Abdullah Al Saud (Arabic: متعب بن عبد الله آل سعود, Mutaʿib bin ʿAbdullāh ʾĀl Suʿūd, alternative spelling Miteb; born 26 March 1952) is a Saudi prince, son of King Abdullah and grandson of Saudi's founder King Abdulaziz, and military officer who served as from 2013 to 2017 and commander of the National Guard from 2010 to 2013. He was arrested on 4 November 2017 along with other Saudi princes including Prince Al Waleed. He was stripped of his position as minister on the same day. He was released on 28 November 2017 after agreeing an "acceptable settlement" with authorities of more than $1 billion (£750m).

== Early life and education ==
Prince Mutaib was born on 26 March 1952. However, other sources report his birth year as 1953 or his birthday as 12 October 1953. Concerning birth place the reports also vary, some arguing that he was born in Riyadh, but another claims that his birthplace is al Ulya, a village in northern Saudi Arabia. His mother was Munira bint Mohammed bin Abdullah Al Otaishan who died in December 2020.

Mutaib is one of 36 children and the third son of King Abdullah.

Mutaib bin Abdullah and his older brother Khalid attended Brummana High School in Lebanon and completed their secondary education in Jeddah. Later, he graduated from the Royal Military Academy Sandhurst as a lieutenant in 1974. He received a master's degree at King Khalid Military College.

== Career ==
Prince Mutaib served as head of the commission responsible for reviewing the curricula of military college built in 1982. One year later, in 1983, King Fahd promoted Mutaib bin Abdullah to the rank of Colonel, and he was also appointed commander of the King Khalid Military City.

In 1990, Prince Mutaib began to serve as deputy head of the military under the chairmanship of the National Guard in addition to his post as the commander of the King Khalid military college and the National Guard military college. In 1995, he was promoted to the rank of the team captain. On 21 December 2000, Mutaib bin Abdullah was made deputy assistant chief of National Guard responsible for military affairs and was also promoted to the rank of general. In June 2009, King Abdullah appointed him as deputy commander of SANG responsible for executive affairs at the rank of minister.

On 17 November 2010, Mutaib bin Abdullah became the commander of SANG, replacing King Abdullah. He conducted a major $3 billion reorganization of SANG to develop its firepower and artillery. Okaz reported in May 2012 that Prince Mutaib had some future plans to establish a body in SANG having female soldiers.

His appointment was commonly considered to reflect King Abdullah's emphasis that it was time to start giving the power to the next generation in a way that would reduce the risk of a power struggle within the Saudi royal family. His appointment was also regarded as a move to prepare him for assuming higher-level responsibility in the future. On 27 May 2013, Prince Mutaib was appointed minister of national guard, a post newly created.

== Arrest ==
On 4 November 2017 Prince Mutaib was arrested and removed from his position as minister of the National Guard and replaced by Khalid bin Abdulaziz bin Mohammed bin Ayyaf Al Muqrin in the post. He was in Riyadh on that day and asked to meet with Crown Prince Mohammad bin Salman.

Prince Mutaib was accused of embezzlement, hiring ghost employees and awarding contracts to his own companies including a $10 billion deal for walkie talkies and bulletproof military gear worth billions of Saudi riyals. Prince Mutaib was released on 28 November 2017 after agreeing to pay authorities a sum, reported to be over $1 billion, or 6 billion Riyals, about 1,6 billion USD. According to one source from inside the Saudi opposition, the price for Prince Mutaib's release was $10 billion.

== Other positions ==
Prince Mutaib was appointed as a cabinet member with the rank of minister of state in November 2010. He was a member of the Military Service Council. He was vice president of the Supreme Committee of the National Festival for Heritage and Culture and the head of the technical committee of the Equestrian Club as well as a member of the board of directors of King Abdulaziz Public Library.

== Business activities ==
At the beginning of the 2000s, Prince Mutaib was the local representative for the Ford Motor Corporation in Saudi Arabia. In 2010 he bought Hotel de Crillon in Paris for $354 million.

== Influence ==
In 1997, Paul Michael Wihbey correctly predicted that Crown Prince Abdullah would make his son, Prince Mutaib, the commander of SANG and that Mutaib would modernize SANG's capabilities in regard to counter-insurgency, information collection and tactical field operations. He also regarded Mutaib as a knowledgeable and highly competent commanding officer with strong professional ties to the U.S. military. It was also emphasized that Prince Mutaib developed close relations with powerful regional political and military leaders, including King Hussein and Turkish Prime Minister Turgut Ozal.

Prince Mutaib's influence seems to begin when he was a military officer in the SANG as a result of being the main advisor to his father, Abdullah, commander of the SANG. During his post in the SANG under King Abdullah's command, Prince Mutaib was reported to answer only to him. He is considered to be a competent member of House of Saud and enjoy a wide following in the large tribes of central Arabia.

Mutaib bin Abdullah is reported to have some characteristics that make him one of the leading second generation princes, such as his low-profile political status and conservative personal approach and commitment to his father’s doctrine, in addition to his strong tribal bonds. However, he is also characterized as both an ambitious and respectable individual. After the death of Crown Prince Nayef on 16 June 2012, Prince Mutaib was regarded as one of the possible contenders for the crown.

== Views ==
Saudi university students organized demonstrations at King Khalid University in March 2012, complaining about negative conditions. Prince Mutaib considered these demonstrations as a threat against the security of the Kingdom. He told that reducing problems and meeting the students' demands were not more urgent than security and stability of the country. He further argued that as a result of recent events in the Arab countries, they should be alert to maintain the stability and security of Saudi Arabia.

In Spring 2013 Prince Mutaib stated "religion (should) not enter into politics" which led a serious concern among religious leaders. Just two days after this statement of Prince Mutaib the clergy met with King Abdullah to express their concern. In addition, Sheikh Abd al-Aziz al-Tarifi responded Prince Mutaib's statement in a tweet: “whoever says there is no relationship between religion and politics worships two gods, one in the heavens and one on earth.”

== Personal life ==
Mutaib bin Abdullah is married to Jawahir bint Abdullah, who is a daughter of his father's uncle Abdullah bin Abdul Rahman. They have six children, three daughters and three sons: Seba, Nouf, Abdullah, Zeina, Saad and Khalid. He is also married to a daughter of Saleh Fustuq whose sister was the former wife of King Abdullah.

His son Abdullah participated in various horse showjumping events. More significantly, Prince Abdullah bin Mutaib had two Olympic appearances, one in 2012 London Olympics. One of Prince Mutaib's sons is married to Nouf bint Abdullah bin Mohammed bin Saud, a daughter of his aunt, Seeta bint Abdulaziz. The daughter of Prince Mutaib, Nouf, is married to Faisal bin Fahd bin Abdullah bin Mohammad bin Abdul Rahman Al Saud.
