= Khalid bin Bandar Al Saud (born 1977) =

Saudi royal (born 1977)

- His Royal Highness and Excellency
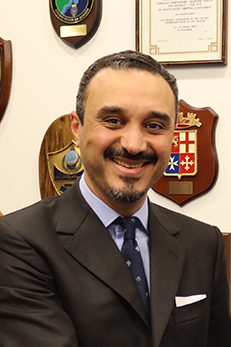

Ambassador of Saudi Arabia to the United Kingdom
- In office: 2019 – 2026
- Successor: Abdullah bin Khalid Al Saud
- Monarch: Salman

Ambassador of Saudi Arabia to Germany
- In office: June 2017 – 27 March 2019
- Successor: Faisal bin Farhan Al Saud
- Monarch: Salman
- Born: 1977 (age 48–49); Paris, France
- Spouse: Lucy Cuthbert (m. 2011)
- House: Al Saud
- Father: Bandar bin Sultan
- Mother: Haifa bint Faisal

Khalid bin Bandar Al Saud (Arabic: خالد بن بندر بن سلطان بن عبد ٱلعزيز آل سعود, romanized: Ḫālid bin Bandar bin Sulṭān bin ʿAbdu l ʿAzīz ʾĀl Suʿūd; born 1977) is a member of the House of Saud. He previously served as the Saudi ambassador to the United Kingdom between 2019 and 2026 and as the Saudi Ambassador to Germany between 2017 and 2019.

Styles of Khalid bin Bandar bin Sultan bin Abdulaziz Al Saud
- Reference style: His Royal Highness
- Spoken style: Your Royal Highness

== Early life and education ==
Born in 1977 in Paris, Khalid bin Bandar is the son of Bandar bin Sultan and Haifa bint Faisal Al Saud. His paternal grandfather is Sultan bin Abdulaziz Al Saud. The parents of his mother are King Faisal bin Abdulaziz and Iffat bint Mohammad Al Thunayan. His parents are both grandchildren of King Abdulaziz, making them first cousins.

Khalid bin Bandar attended Eton College before going up to Pembroke College, Oxford, where he graduated in Oriental studies. He also attended Sandhurst Military Academy, graduating as a commissioned officer, before becoming a post-graduate at Fletcher School of Law and Diplomacy.

== Career ==
Khalid bin Bandar started his career working at the United Nations' department of political affairs in New York. He worked for three years as an advisor to the Saudi Ambassador in Washington DC. He is the former executive chairman of Dayim Holdings founded in 2006. Khalid previously held the positions of acting general manager of Al Hama Company, a Saudi-based retail company, and the chairman of Byblos Real Estate Development Company based in the United Arab Emirates.

In June 2017, he became the Saudi ambassador to Germany. In 2019, he was made the Saudi ambassador to the United Kingdom.

== Personal life ==
Khalid dated and lived with Vanessa Haydon, the future wife of Donald Trump Jr., from 1998 to 2001. They intended to marry, but broke up after the September 11 attacks when he left the U.S. after his father was suspected of having indirect ties to the hijackers.

In Oxford in March 2011, Khalid married Lucy Caroline Cuthbert (born 1982), daughter of John Aidan Cuthbert, of Beaufront Castle, Hexham, Northumberland, and Lady Victoria Lucy Diana (daughter of Hugh Percy, 10th Duke of Northumberland), and thus, niece of Ralph Percy, 12th Duke of Northumberland, at a ceremony attended by a handful of guests.
