= Turki bin Sultan Al Saud =

Saudi royal and government official (1959–2012)

Deputy Minister of Culture and Information
- In office: September 2011 – 25 December 2012
- Successor: Abdullah Al Jasser
- Monarch: King Abdullah
- Born: 6 October 1959
- Died: 25 December 2012 (aged 53); Riyadh Military Hospital, Riyadh
- Burial: 26 December 2012; Al Oud cemetery, Riyadh
- Issue: Abdulaziz; Al Anoud
Names
- Turki bin Sultan bin Abdulaziz Al Saud
- House: Al Saud
- Father: Sultan bin Abdulaziz
- Mother: Munira bint Abdulaziz bin Musaed Al Saud
- Education: King Saud University; Syracuse University

Turki bin Sultan Al Saud (Arabic: تركي بن سلطان بن عبد العزيز آل سعود; 6 October 1959 – 25 December 2012) was deputy minister of culture and information of Saudi Arabia. He was a member of the House of Saud and was one of the grandsons of Saudi's founder King Abdulaziz.

== Early life and education ==
Turki bin Sultan was born on 6 October 1959. He was the son of former Crown Prince Sultan. He was also the full brother of Khalid bin Sultan, Fahd bin Sultan and Faisal bin Sultan. Their mother was Munira bint Abdulaziz bin Musaed Al Jiluwi, who died in Paris in August 2011. Moneera bint Abdulaziz was the sister of Alanoud, the spouse of King Fahd, and also King Khalid and Prince Muhammed's cousin.

After completing his education in media studies in King Saud University in 1981, Turki bin Sultan received a Master of Arts degree from Syracuse University in international communications in 1983 where he was awarded the title of outstanding graduate student.

Later, he joined an American TV network, CBS, as a trainee for one year. He served as CBS's New York representative in 1983.

== Career ==
Turki bin Sultan was appointed director of the press section at the foreign information department of the ministry of culture and information. In 1986, he was promoted as foreign information advisor at the same ministry. Then, he became assistant deputy minister of culture and information for planning and studies affairs in 1990. Beginning in 1996, he served at the ministry of information as assistant deputy minister of information for the foreign information.

In May 2001, Turki bin Sultan was appointed assistant minister of culture and information by King Fahd. His tenure as assistant minister was extended in April 2005 for four years. He was also the supervisor general of Saudi sports channel.

King Abdullah appointed Turki bin Sultan as deputy minister of culture and information for media affairs with the rank of minister on 4 September 2011. Abdullah Al Jasser succeeded Prince Turki in the post following his death.

== Other positions ==
In 1995, Turki bin Sultan was appointed as a member of the board of trustees of the Sultan bin Abdulaziz Al Saud Foundation and was a member of the foundation. He was also the acting secretary of the foundation.

In 1999, he presided over the organizing committee for the Kingdom's centennial celebrations. In 1989, Prince Turki led foreign information teams participating in the exhibition 'The Kingdom of Saudi Arabia, Yesterday and Today' organized in France, U.S.A. and Egypt; he was involved in the Kingdom's exhibitions in Los Angeles in 1990 and in Spain in 1992. He attended meetings of the Arab information ministers held in Tunisia and Egypt in 1998.

== Personal life ==
Turki bin Sultan was married to Princess Jawaher bint Khalid bin Turki bin Abdulaziz Al Saud (daughter of Princess Al Anoud Al Faisal bin Abdulaziz Al Saud), and fathered two children, Abdulaziz (married to Princess Al Jazzy bint Nawaf bin Musaed bin Abdulaziz Al Saud) and Al Anoud (married to Prince Mohammed bin Abdulaziz bin Mishaal bin Abdulaziz Al Saud and has two children: Princess Sarah and Prince Turki). His son Prince Abdulaziz has a son named Turki bin Abdulaziz.

Prince Turki was the author of a book concerning public relations of Saudi and American armoured forces entitled Military Media. He was an honorary member of Al Hilal club.

== Death and funeral ==
Turki bin Sultan died of a heart attack on 25 December 2012 at Riyadh military hospital. The Royal Court officially announced his death. He was 53. His funeral was performed after Asr prayer led by Abdulaziz Al Asheikh at Imam Turki bin Abdullah Mosque in Riyadh with the attendance of senior princes and officials, including Crown Prince Salman bin Abdulaziz (later King Salman), on 26 December 2012.
