= Fahd bin Abdullah bin Mohammed Al Saud =

Saudi royal and military official (born 1941)

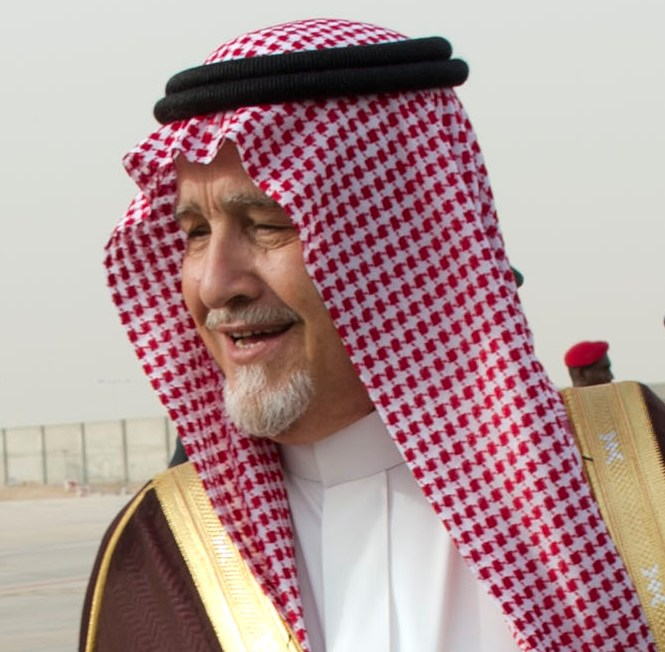

Deputy Minister of Defense
- In office 21 April 2013 – 7 August 2013
- Monarch: King Abdullah
- Minister: Salman bin Abdulaziz
- Preceded by: Khalid bin Sultan
- Succeeded by: Salman bin Sultan

Personal details
- Born: 1941 (age 84–85)
- Spouse: Fahda bint Bandar bin Mohammed Al Saud
- Children: 8
- Parent(s): Abdullah bin Mohammed Al Saud; Noura bint Saud Al Saud
- Education: US Naval Staff and Command College
- Awards: Order of Abdulaziz Al Saud

Military service
- Allegiance: Saudi Arabia
- Branch/service: Royal Saudi Navy
- Rank: Lieutenant general

Fahd bin Abdullah Al Saud (Arabic: فهد بن عبد الله آل سعود) (born 1941) is the former deputy defence minister of Saudi Arabia and a member of the House of Saud.

== Early life and education ==
Prince Fahd is the son of Abdullah bin Mohammad and Noura bint Saud (died late July 2013), King Saud's daughter. His father was the older maternal half brother of the Sudairi Seven (only son of Hassa bint Ahmed Al Sudairi through her marriage to Mohammad bin Abdul Rahman, half-brother of King Abdulaziz). Prince Fahd has four brothers and two sisters, and he has half siblings from his father's other marriages.

Prince Fahd is a graduate of the US Naval Staff and Command College. He holds a master's degree in military sciences. He also attended advanced naval programs in the US, the UK and Pakistan. In addition, he participated in programs on command and staff at the Military College in the US.

== Career ==
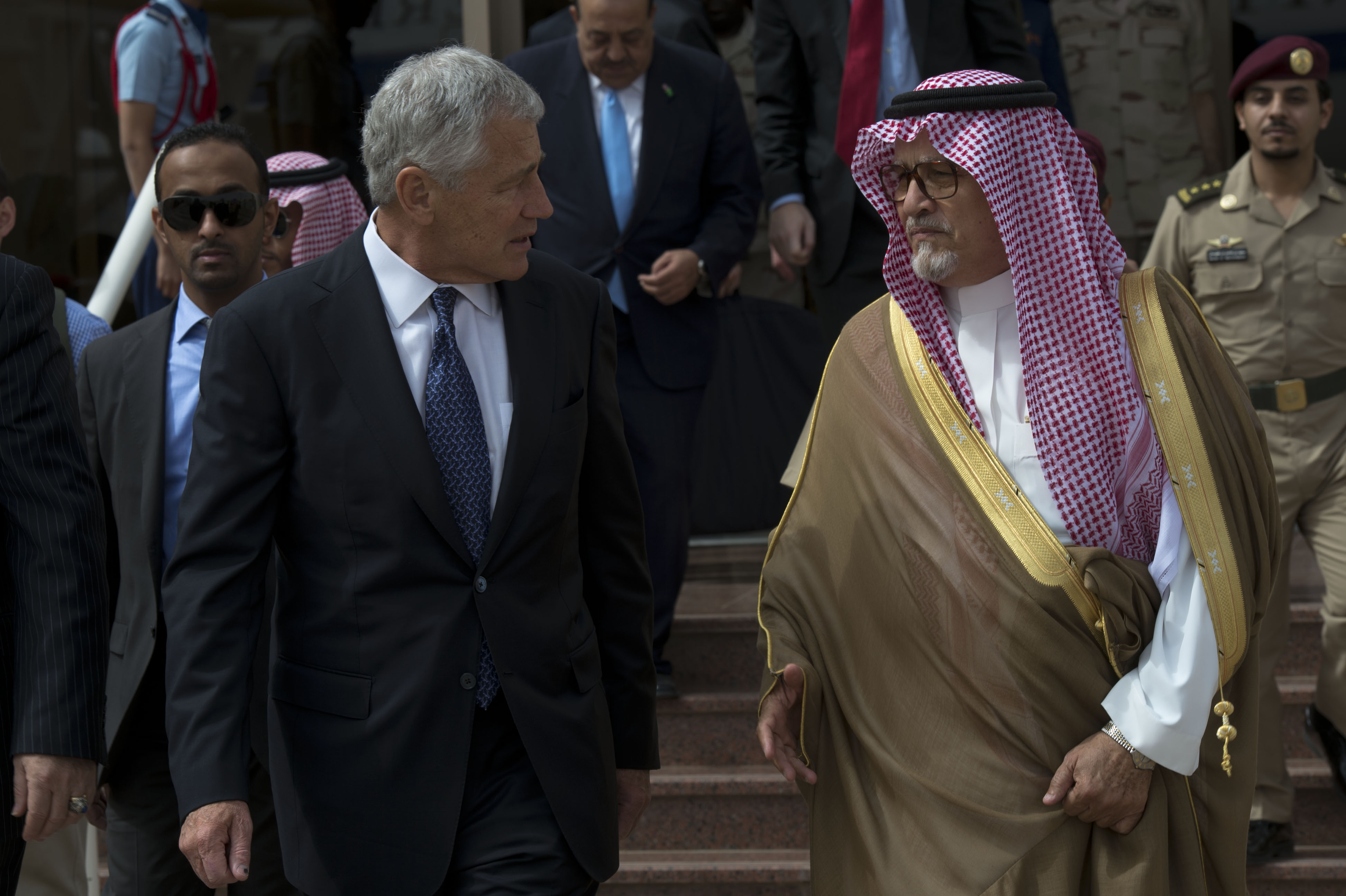
Prince Fahd with US Secretary of Defense Chuck Hagel, April 2013

Fahd bin Abdullah was a military officer. He had business activities while serving in these posts. He became the commander of the marine forces in Royal Saudi Navy in April 2002. He also served at the ships of King Abdulaziz and the floating units of the marine base. In addition, he assumed the following posts: the chief of the operations authority of the Naval Forces, director at the office of the minister of defense and aviation and inspector general and then deputy commander of the naval forces. He retired from navy at the rank of lieutenant general. Then he was made assistant to the minister of defense and aviation as well as the chairman of the economic offset committee at the ministry of defense and aviation.

On 20 April 2013, he was appointed deputy defence minister at the rank of minister, replacing Khalid bin Sultan in the post. However, Prince Fahd's tenure was very brief, and he was replaced by Salman bin Sultan, son of late Prince Sultan, on 7 August 2013.

Prince Fahd is the chairman of Fama Group Holding based in Riyadh.

== Arrest ==
On 4 November 2017, Fahd bin Abdullah bin Mohammed Al Saud was arrested in Saudi Arabia in a corruption crackdown conducted by a newly founded royal anti-corruption committee.

== Personal life ==
Prince Fahd is married to Fahda bint Bandar bin Mohammed bin Abdul Rahman Al Saud. They have eight children. His son, Abdulaziz, is married to Princess Sara, daughter of the former deputy minister of defense Khalid bin Sultan Al Saud.

Prince Fahd is known for his love of the desert and Arabian horses.

== Ancestry ==
Ancestors of Fahd bin Abdullah bin Mohammed Al Saud

16. Imam Faisal
8. Abdul Rahman bin Faisal
17. Sarah bint Mishari bin Abdulrahman bin Hassan Al Saud
4. Muhammad bin Abdul-Rahman
18. Jiluwi bin Turki Al Jiluwi
9. Sara bint Jiluwi bin Turki Al Jiluwi
2. Abdullah bin Mohammad
20. Muhammed bin Ahmed Al Kabir Al Sudairi
10. Ahmed bin Muhammed Al Sudairi
5. Hassa bint Ahmed Al Sudairi
22. Ali bin Mohammed Al Suwaidi
11. Sharifa bint Ali bin Mohammed Al Suwaidi
1. Fahd bin Abdullah
24. See 8
12. Ibn Saud
25. Sarah bint Ahmed Al Kabir bin Mohammed Al Sudairi
6. King Saud
26. Muhammad bin 'Hussein Al-Orair
13. Wadhah bint Muhammad bin 'Hussein Al Orair
3. Noura bint Saud
7. Lulwa Saleh Al Sabhan
