= Salman bin Sultan Al Saud =

Saudi royal and military officer (born 1976)

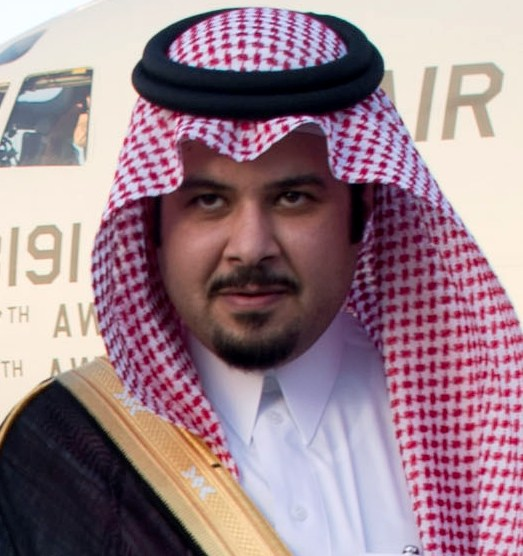

Governor of Madinah Province
- In office: 12 December 2023 –present
- Predecessor: Faisal bin Salman Al Saud
- Appointed by: King Salman

Deputy Defense Minister
- Reign: 6 August 2013 – 14 May 2014
- Predecessor: Fahd bin Abdullah Al Saud
- Successor: Khalid bin Bandar Al Saud
- Monarch: King Abdullah

Assistant Secretary General of the Saudi Arabian National Security Council
- In office: ? – 6 August 2013
- Monarch: King Abdullah
- Born: 2 February 1976 (age 50); Dhahran, Saudi Arabia
- Spouse: Falwa bint Ahmed bin Abdulaziz Al Saud
Names
- Salman bin Sultan bin Abdulaziz bin Abdul Rahman Al Saud
- Dynasty: Al Saud
- Father: Sultan bin Abdulaziz
- Education: King Abdulaziz Military College

Salman bin Sultan Al Saud (Arabic: سلمان بن سلطان بن عبد العزيز آل سعود; born 2 February 1976) is the former assistant secretary general of the Saudi Arabian National Security Council for intelligence and security affairs as well as the former deputy defense minister. He is a member of the House of Saud, one of the grandsons of Saudi Arabia's founder King Abdulaziz. He has a company based in the British Virgin Islands which deals with the management of a property in the Belgravia district, London. He has been the governor of Madinah province since 12 December 2023.

== Early life and education ==
Prince Salman was born in Dhahran on 2 February 1976. His father is Prince Sultan bin Abdulaziz, former Crown Prince of Saudi Arabia. Salman bin Sultan has a bachelor's degree in military sciences that he received from King Abdulaziz Military College. He also attended several courses in security and intelligence matters.

== Career ==
Salman bin Sultan began his career as a lieutenant in the Saudi royal air defense force. He later worked as platoon commander in an air defense unit. Then he served as a military attaché with the rank of first lieutenant at the Saudi Embassy in Washington, D.C. during Prince Bandar's tenure as ambassador to the United States at the beginning of the 2000s. Later, he was made minister plenipotentiary at the Saudi Embassy in Washington D.C. His tenure lasted until 2008.

Prince Salman served as the assistant secretary general of the National Security Council (NSC) for intelligence and security affairs. He was promoted to the excellent rank in the post in August 2011. During his tenure until 6 August 2013, he closely worked with Bandar bin Sultan who headed the NSC in addition to the General Intelligence Presidency. Prince Salman was one of three Saudi officials who were instrumental in implementing the Syria policy of Saudi Arabia along with foreign minister Prince Saud and Prince Bandar.

Prince Salman was appointed deputy defense minister at the rank of minister on 6 August 2013, replacing Fahd bin Abdullah Al Saud in the post. Prince Salman was relieved of his duty upon his request on 14 May 2014 and replaced by Khalid bin Bandar Al Saud in the post.

Prince Salman was named as the governor of Madinah province on 12 December 2023 with the rank of minister. He succeeded Faisal bin Salman Al Saud in the post.

Prince Salman is deputy secretary general of Sultan bin Abdulaziz Al Saud Foundation.

== Personal life ==
Prince Salman is married to Falwa bint Ahmed bin Abdulaziz, the daughter of his uncle and former minister of interior, Prince Ahmed. In May 2025 his daughter Seeta married Faisal bin Bandar bin Khalid, a grandson of Khalid Al-Faisal.
