= Turki bin Abdullah Al Saud (born 1971) =

Saudi royal and official (born 1971)

Governor of Riyadh Province
- In office: 14 May 2014 – 29 January 2015
- Predecessor: Khalid bin Bandar Al Saud
- Successor: Faisal bin Bandar Al Saud
- Monarch: King Abdullah; King Salman

Deputy Governor of Riyadh Province
- In office: 14 February 2013 – 14 May 2014
- Predecessor: Muhammad bin Saad
- Monarch: King Abdullah
- Born: 21 October 1971
- Spouse: Hala bint Khalid bin Sultan Al Saud (divorced)
Names
- Turki bin Abdullah bin Abdulaziz bin Abdul Rahman bin Faisal Al Saud
- House: Al Saud
- Father: King Abdullah
- Mother: Tathi bint Mishan Al Faisal Al Jarba
- Education: King Faisal Air Academy; University of Wales; University of Leeds

Turki bin Abdullah Al Saud (Arabic: تركي بن عبد الله آل سعود) (born 21 October 1971) is the seventh son of former King Abdullah of Saudi Arabia and one of the grandsons of Saudi's founder King Abdulaziz. He served as deputy governor and then, governor of Riyadh Province from 2013 to 29 January 2015. He was one of the 11 princes detained in November 2017 by Mohammad bin Salman as a part of his anti-corruption drive on accusations of corruption in the Riyadh Metro project and taking advantage of his influence to award contracts to his own companies. It was reported in August 2023 that after a trial he was sentenced to 17 years in prison.

== Early life and education ==
Turki bin Abdullah was born on 21 October 1971. He is the seventh son of King Abdullah. His mother, Tathi bint Mishan Al Faisal Al Jarba, is a member of the Iraqi branch of the Shammar tribe. He has six blood siblings, including Prince Mishaal and Princess Oraib, wife of Salman bin Abdulaziz bin Salman who has been in detention since early 2018 together with his father.

Prince Turki began his higher education at King Faisal Air Academy. Then he went to the United States to continue his education, and trained at Lackland Air Force Base in Texas. He was also trained at King Fahd Air Base in Taif. Then he attended a course of command and staff at Joint Command College in the United Kingdom and received a master's degree in military science. He also holds a master's degree in strategic studies, which he obtained from the University of Wales. As of 2013, Prince Turki was a PhD candidate in international strategic studies at the University of Leeds.

== Career ==
Turki was a military officer and an F-15 pilot in the Royal Saudi Air Force. In October 1997, he was promoted to the rank of captain pilot and later to the rank of colonel. In July 2006, Prince Turki was decorated with the rank of lieutenant colonel pilot. Then Prince Turki worked at the King Abdulaziz Air Base in Dhahran as the commander of Squadron 92, 3rd air wing with a rank of group captain. In 2010, Prince Turki began to serve as the commander of the Red Flag-4 exercise group.

In addition, Turki was the head of the board of directors of the Saudi Equestrian Fund. He also has several business investments in Saudi Arabia, including an aviation company named Al Obayya Corp.

Turki was appointed deputy governor of the Riyadh province on 14 February 2013, replacing Muhammad bin Saad in the post. Therefore, he became deputy of the governor, Khalid bin Bandar, who was also appointed the same day. On 14 May 2014, he was appointed governor of Riyadh at the rank of minister. Prince Turki's term as governor ended on 29 January 2015 when Faisal bin Bandar Al Saud was appointed to the post.

=== Controversy ===
In 2005, Prince Turki bin Abdullah co-founded the PetroSaudi, a private oil company. The company grew from drilling and oilfield management into trading, opening offices in London's Mayfair district with pictures of Saudi royalty and decked with national flags. The company is embroiled in the 1Malaysia Development Berhad scandal. Prince Turki bin Abdullah is claimed to be the Saudi royal who gifted Malaysian Prime Minister Najib Razak $700 million.

== Arrest and trial ==
On 4 November 2017, Turki bin Abdullah Al Saud was detained on accusations of corruption in the Riyadh Metro project and taking advantage of his influence to award contracts to his own companies in a "corruption crackdown" conducted by a new royal anti-corruption committee in Saudi Arabia.

After being detained for nearly six years Prince Turki was sentenced to 17 years in prison in August 2023.

== Achievements ==
Prince Turki was one of the key characters for Riyadh's metro creation.

Prince Turki was an active member of King Abdulaziz Foundation, as well as Prince Muhammed bin Abdulaziz Hospital in Riyadh. He assisted in the "intellectual security" inauguration ceremony alongside the Committee for the Promotion of Virtue and Prevention of Vice.

== Personal life ==
Prince Turki was the son-in-law of Prince Khalid bin Sultan. He married Hala bint Khalid on 14 January 2010. They have a daughter.
