= Bandar bin Abdulaziz Al Saud =

Saudi royal (1923-2019)

- Prince Bandar c. 2016
- Born: 7 July 1923; Riyadh, Sultanate of Nejd
- Died: 28 July 2019 (aged 96); Jeddah, Saudi Arabia
- Burial: 29 July 2019; Al Adl Cemetery, Mecca
- Spouse: Sumaya bint Abdul Rahman bin Muhammad bin Muammar; Munira bint Muhammad Al Majrur Al Jabour Al Subaie; Al Anoud bint Muhanna bin Abdul Rahman Al Muhanna Aba Al Khail
- Issue: 23
Names
- Bandar bin Abdulaziz bin Abdul Rahman bin Faisal Al Saud
- House: Al Saud
- Father: King Abdulaziz
- Mother: Bazza

Bandar bin Abdulaziz Al Saud (Arabic: بندر بن عبد العزيز آل سعود Bandar bin ʿAbdulʿazīz Āl Saʿūd; 7 July 1923 – 28 July 2019) was the tenth son of King Abdulaziz. At the time of his death, he was the eldest surviving member of the Saudi ruling family.

== Early life ==
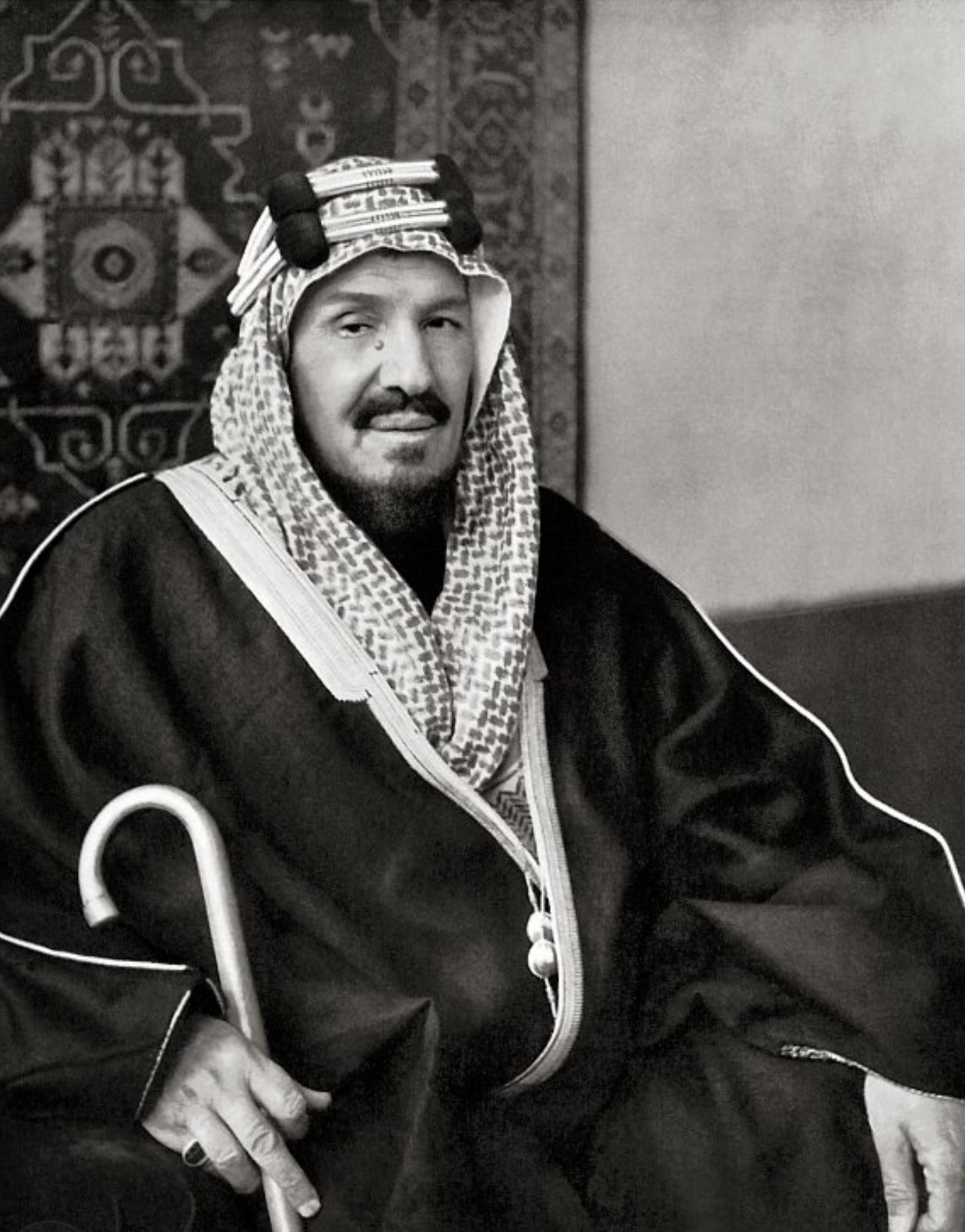
King Abdulaziz, Bandar's father

Bandar was reportedly born in Riyadh in 1923, though Talal Kapoor reports his birth year as 1921. His mother was Bazza who died in 1940. He was the tenth son of King Abdulaziz, and his full brother was Prince Fawwaz.

== Succession ==
Prince Bandar stepped aside from the line of succession, despite his opposition to the selection of one of his half-brothers, Prince Sultan, as a future ruler. King Fahd appointed Prince Sultan as second deputy prime minister in 1982, making him second in line for the throne. Bandar's only government service was the director general at the interior ministry, and the fact that his mother was Moroccan may also have counted against him. Similar claims by his half-brother Prince Musaid were also rejected in that his son, Faisal bin Musaid, had assassinated King Faisal in 1975. As compensation, however, two of Bandar's sons were given important jobs: Mansour bin Bandar was made the commander of Prince Abdullah Air Base at Jeddah, and Faisal bin Bandar the governor of Al-Qassim Province.

== Career and personal life ==
Bandar's only official government position was as director general at the interior ministry. He was a businessman. His various business concerns included Tabuk Cement Co. and Riyadh Recreational Hotels Co. He was one of the founders of the Dar Al Maal Al Islami Trust, which was initiated by Mohammed bin Faisal Al Saud, King Faisal's son, in 1981.

Bandar married three times, and his spouses were Sumaya bint Abdul Rahman bin Muhammad bin Muammar, Munira bint Muhammad Al Majrur Al Jabour Al Subaie and Al Anoud bint Muhanna bin Abdul Rahman Al Muhanna Aba Al Khail. He had 23 children. His sons have been given both government and military posts. His son Faisal is a former deputy governor of Asir Province, and served as governor of Al-Qassim Region from 1992 to 2015 when he was appointed governor of Riyadh. Another son, Abdulaziz, was deputy chief of the Al Mukhabarat Al A'amah (Intelligence Presidency) until 5 October 2012 when he resigned from the post. Bandar's third son, Prince Khalid, served as the president of general intelligence, the governor of Riyadh Province, and a Lieutenant General and commander in the Royal Saudi Land Forces. A fourth son, Mansour, was a Royal Saudi Air Force (RSAF) officer who served as the commander of a McDonnell Douglas F-15 Eagle squadron at King Abdul-Aziz Air Base (Dhahran) in the early 1980s. His son Turki is also a military officer who has been serving as the commander of the Royal Saudi Air Force since 2018. One of his younger sons, Abdullah bin Bandar, has been minister of National Guard since December 2018.

Bandar died in July 2019, reportedly aged 96. Funeral prayers were held in Great Mosque in Mecca on 29 July 2019.

== Honors ==
Prince Bandar was the recipient of the following decorations: Order of the Republic (first grade), Order of the Nile and Order of the Kingdom of Iraq.
