= Fahd bin Sultan Al Saud =

Saudi royal and governor (born 1950)

Governor of Tabuk Province
- In office: 1987–present
- Predecessor: Mamdouh bin Abdulaziz
- Monarch: King Fahd; King Abdullah; King Salman
- Born: 20 October 1950 (age 75); Riyadh, Saudi Arabia
Names
- Fahd bin Sultan bin Abdulaziz bin Abdul Rahman Al Saud
- House: Al Saud
- Father: Sultan bin Abdulaziz
- Mother: Munira bint Abdulaziz bin Musaed Al Saud
- Education: King Saud University

Fahd bin Sultan Al Saud (Arabic: فهد بن سلطان بن عبد العزيز آل سعود; born 20 October 1950) has been the governor of Tabuk Province since 1987, a member of House of Saud, and a grandson of Saudi's founder King Abdulaziz.

== Early life and education ==
Fahd bin Sultan was born in Riyadh on 20 October 1950. He is the second eldest son of Sultan bin Abdulaziz. He is the full brother of Khalid bin Sultan, Faisal bin Sultan and Turki bin Sultan. Their mother was Munira bint Abdulaziz bin Musaed Al Jiluwi, who died in Paris in August 2011 aged 80. Munira bint Abdulaziz was the sister of Al Anoud, a spouse of King Fahd, and the cousin of King Khalid and Prince Muhammed.

Fahd bin Sultan obtained a bachelor's degree in history from King Saud University in 1970. He also received a master's degree in the United States.

== Career ==
Prince Fahd began his career at the ministry of labour and social affairs. He first served as the director of research there from 1969 to 1970. He later appointed the director general of social welfare again at the same ministry in 1970. In November 1977, Fahd bin Sultan was appointed the deputy minister responsible for social welfare affairs in the ministry of labour and social affairs. Then he was appointed deputy president of sport and welfare.

He was appointed governor of Tabuk province in July 1987, replacing Mamdouh bin Abdulaziz. He has been the governor since then.

=== Activities ===
In 2002, Fahd bin Sultan undertook the cost of extending power lines to al Assafiya village and paid the electric bills for 3 years.

In 2003, he began to establish a college, Fahd bin Sultan College in Tabuk. The college was opened by his father, Sultan bin Abdulaziz. It was approved by King Abdullah as a university on 2 October 2011.

In Tabuk, a private hospital was established with his name, Prince Fahd bin Sultan Hospital, in 1995. It features eleven outpatient clinics, emergency room, inpatient service, medical support services and other services.

=== Controversy ===
In January 2014, Prince Fahd hunted, 2100 endangered houbara bustards in Chagai, Balochistan, Pakistan. He hunted for 21 days – from 11 January to 31 January 2014– and hunted 1,977 birds, while other members of his party hunted an additional 123 birds, bringing the total bustard toll to 2,100 (roughly 2% of the remaining population). The houbara bustard is listed as an endangered species; hunting it is completely banned in Pakistan. In Pakistan, hunting the houbara is only by special permit for visiting royalty. Such permits allow for a maximum total bag of 100 birds, which must not be hunted in reserved areas. The Prince reportedly hunted extensively in reserved areas. The houbara is widely prized in Arabia as a quarry for falconers, particularly because its meat is valued as an aphrodisiac.

== Other positions ==
Fahd bin Sultan is deputy chairman of Sultan bin Abdulaziz Al Saud Foundation that deals with varied charity activities. He himself was reported to launch a number of charity projects under the Prince Fahd bin Sultan Social Charity Program Society that would target various sectors. He is also the honorary president of the Saudi Pharmaceutical Society. He is chairman of the board of trustees of Fahd bin Sultan University, too.

Political offices
| Preceded by Mamdouh bin Abdulaziz | Governor of Tabuk Province; 1987 – present | Succeeded by Incumbent |
