= Turki bin Bandar Al Saud =

Saudi royal and military official

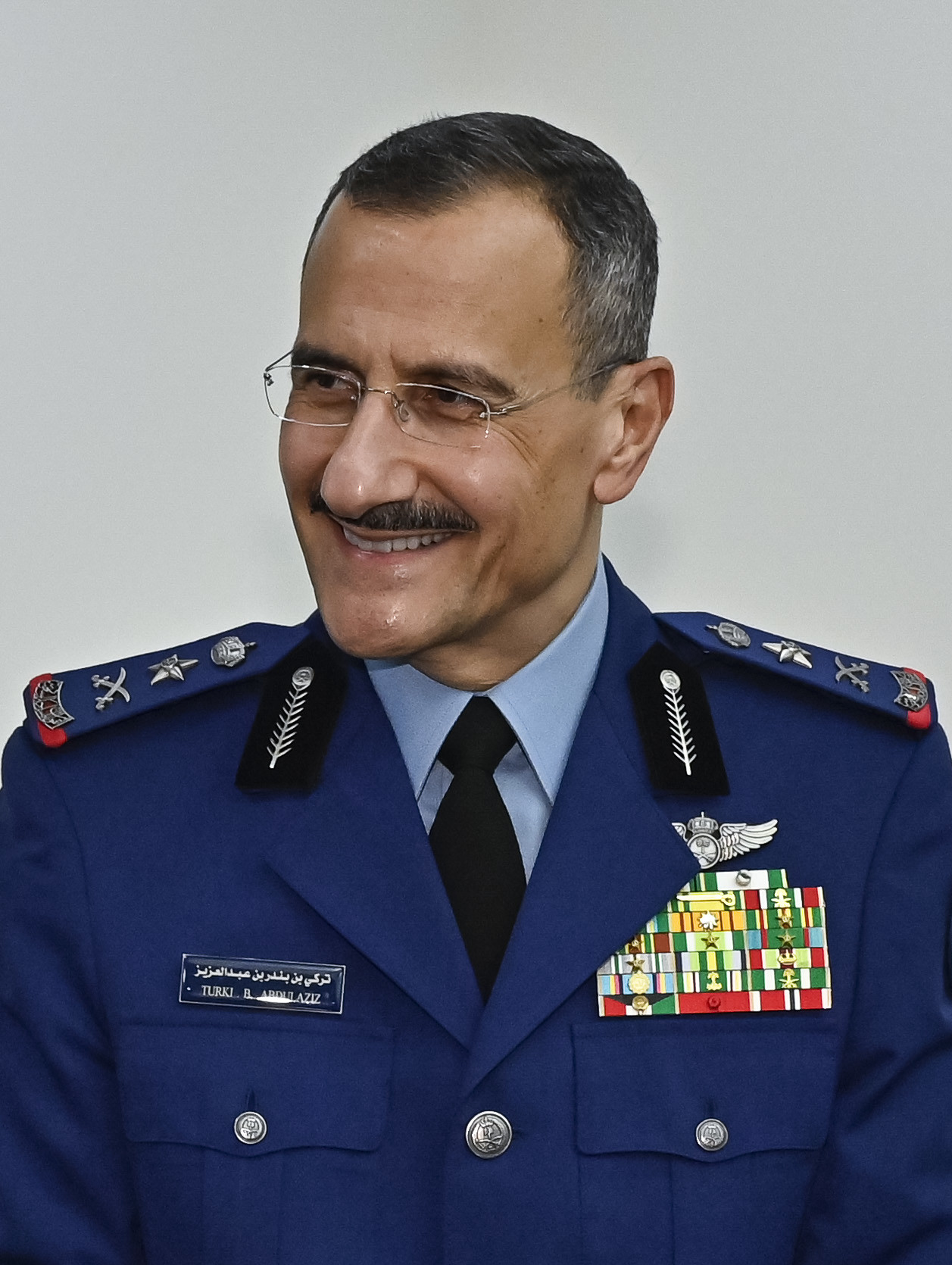
Names
- Turki bin Bandar bin Abdulaziz bin Abdul Rahman bin Faisal Al Saud
- House: Al Saud
- Military career
- Allegiance: Saudi Arabia
- Branch: Royal Saudi Air Force
- Rank: Lieutenant General
- Commands: Commander of the Royal Air Force; King Abdulaziz Air Base
- Conflicts: Gulf War
- Father: Bandar bin Abdulaziz Al Saud

Lieutenant General Prince Turki bin Bandar Al Saud (Arabic: تركي بن بندر آل سعود) is a member of the Saudi royal family, a grandson of King Abdulaziz, who has been the commander of Royal Saudi Air Force since 2018.

== Early life and education ==
Prince Turki is a son of Bandar bin Abdulaziz Al Saud. One of his brothers is Prince Khalid.

Prince Turki received a bachelor's degree in aerial science.

== Career ==
He held several position in the Saudi Air Force, including operations center director, zone commander, flight officer and the commander of King Abdulaziz Air Base in Dhahran and in the Eastern Province. He was promoted to the rank of lieutenant general and named the commander of Saudi Air Force in February 2018.

== Honours ==
Turki bin Bandar is the recipient of Kuwait Liberation Medal and the 30-Year Military Service Pendant.
