= Faisal bin Bandar Al Saud (born 1945) =

Saudi royal and politician (born 1946)

- فيصل بن بندر بن آل سعود
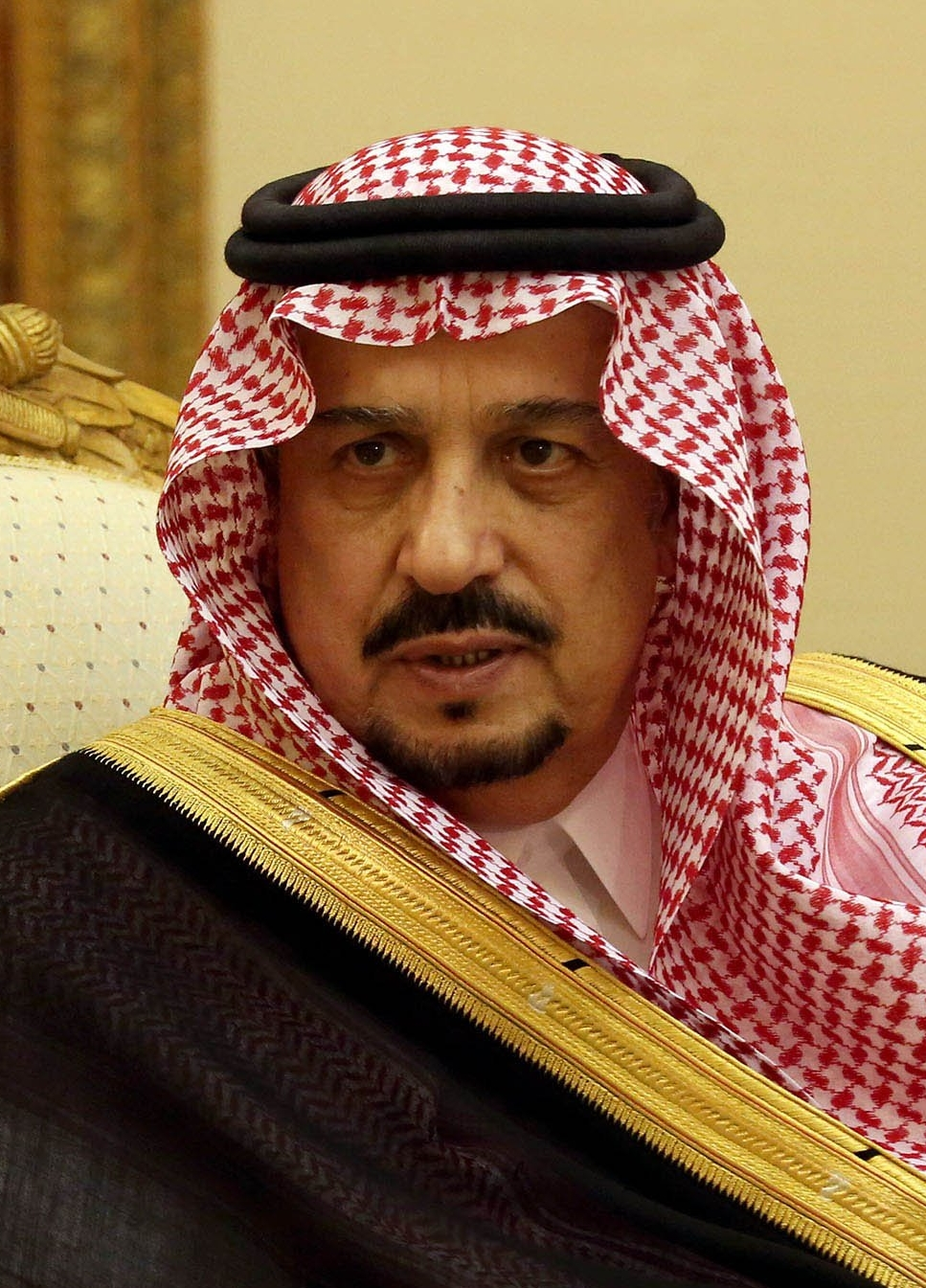
- Prince Faisal bin Bandar in April 2017

Governor of Riyadh Province
- Incumbent
- Assumed office 29 January 2015
- Appointed by: King Salman
- Preceded by: Turki bin Abdullah

Governor of Al-Qassim Province
- In office May 1992 – 29 January 2015
- Appointed by: King Fahd
- Succeeded by: Faisal bin Mishaal

Personal details
- Born: 1945 (age 80–81) Saudi Arabia
- Spouse: Princess Noura bint Muhammad
- Children: Prince Muhammed; Prince Bandar; Princess Sara; Prince Mishail
- House: House of Saud
- Parents: Bandar bin Abdulaziz (father); Wasmiyah Al-Mu'ammar (mother)

Faisal bin Bandar bin Abdulaziz Al Saud (born 1945) is a Saudi Arabian royal who has served as the governor of Riyadh Province since 2015. Prior to his appointment in Riyadh, he served as governor of Al-Qassim Province for more than two decades, from 1992 to 2015.

== Early life and education ==
Prince Faisal was born in 1945. He is the eldest son of Prince Bandar bin Abdulaziz. His mother is Wasmiyah bint Abdul Rahman Al Mu'ammar. Prince Faisal obtained a bachelor of arts degree in Management at King Saud University in 1969.

== Career ==
Faisal bin Bandar is a former military officer. In 1970, he served as the director of the organization and administration department of the Ministry of Defense. He began to serve as the director of the training department of the Ministry of Communication in 1974. Then he was appointed assistant deputy governor of Asir Province in 1978 which he held until 1981. He was named as deputy governor of the same province in May 1981. He was the governor of Al-Qassim Province from May 1992 to 29 January 2015 when he was named as the governor of Riyadh Province. He replaced Turki bin Abdullah as governor of Riyadh Province. Faisal bin Mishaal Al Saud became the governor of Al Qassim Province on the same date.

On 20 April 2016, he was heading the delegation welcoming US president Barack Obama to Riyadh.

== Alliances ==
Prince Faisal was considered close to King Abdullah.

== Other positions ==
Faisal bin Bandar is a member of the Allegiance Council since its formation in 2007.

== Personal life ==
Faisal bin Bandar is married to Noura bint Muhammad bin Saud bin Abdul Rahman and has four children: Mohammad, Bandar, Sara and Mishail. His son Mohammad is a military officer and a jet pilot at the Royal Saudi Air Force (RSAF). Another son, Bandar, was appointed assistant chief of General Intelligence in June 2017.

On 8 April 2020, The New York Times reported that Faisal bin Bandar was in intensive care with COVID-19 complications.
