= Khalid bin Sultan Al Saud =

Saudi royal and government official (born 1947)

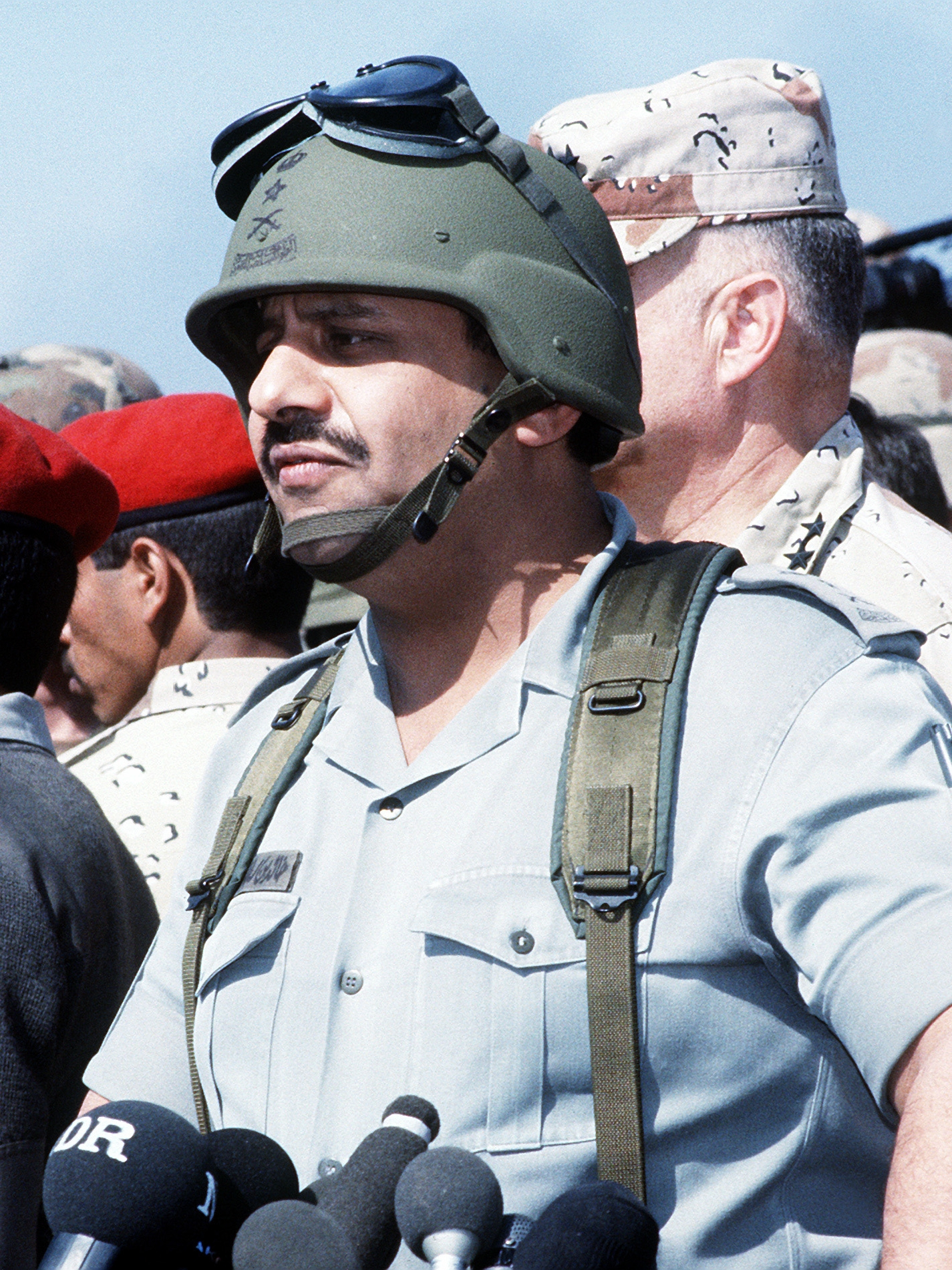
- Prince Khalid during the Gulf War

Deputy Minister of Defense
- In office 5 November 2011 – 20 April 2013
- Monarch: Abdullah
- Prime Minister: King Abdullah
- Minister: Salman bin Abdulaziz
- Preceded by: Abdul Rahman bin Abdulaziz
- Succeeded by: Fahd bin Abdullah bin Mohammed Al Saud

Assistant Minister of Defense and Aviation and General Inspector for the Military Affairs
- In office 17 January 2001 – 5 November 2011
- Monarch: Abdullah
- Prime Minister: King Abdullah
- Minister: Sultan bin Abdulaziz
- Succeeded by: Muhammad bin Abdullah Al Ayesh

Personal details
- Born: 24 September 1947 (age 79) Mecca, Saudi Arabia
- Spouse(s): Luluwah bint Fahd (until 1978; divorced); Abeer bint Turki
- Children: Princess Reema; Prince Faisal; Princess Sara; Princess Hala; Prince Fahd; Prince Abdullah; Prince Salman; Prince Mishail
- Parent(s): Sultan bin Abdulaziz; Munira bint Abdulaziz bin Musaed bin Jiluwi
- Education: Royal Military Academy Sandhurst; CGSC; Air War College; Auburn University at Montgomery

Military service
- Allegiance: Saudi Arabia
- Branch/service: Royal Saudi Air Force
- Years of service: 1968–1991
- Rank: General
- Battles/wars: Gulf War; Battle of Khafji; Air to Air combat; Houthi insurgency; Operation Scorched Earth

Khalid bin Sultan Al Saud (Arabic: خالد بن سلطان بن عبد العزيز آل سعود; born 24 September 1947) is the former deputy minister of defense, a member of the House of Saud, and a grandson of King Abdulaziz.

== Early life and education ==
Prince Khalid was born on 24 September 1947. He is the oldest son of Prince Sultan and full brother of Fahd bin Sultan, Faisal bin Sultan and Turki bin Sultan. Their mother is Munira bint Abdulaziz bin Musaed bin Jiluwi who died in Paris on 24 August 2011. Moneera bint Abdulaziz was a sister of Alanoud, spouse of King Fahd. She was also cousin of King Khalid and Prince Muhammed.

Khalid bin Sultan is a graduate of King Saud University. He attended the Royal Military Academy Sandhurst from January 1967, where he was a corporal in the cadet government, and graduated in 1968. He also studied at the US Army's Command and General Staff College at Fort Leavenworth in Kansas. He graduated from the Air War College at Maxwell Air Force Base in Alabama. He also holds a master's degree in political science which he received from Auburn University at Montgomery in 1980.

== Career ==
In the first years as a soldier, despite his choice to be selected for special forces personnel, Khalid bin Sultan was given a command of an artillery platoon in Tabuk province. Later, his position advanced as he was given a task for conducting contract and purchasing of Saudi Arabia's first guided missile with the People's Republic of China. For this prominent role, he was given an honorary title "Father of Saudi Arabia's Missile".

After years in the army, thinking that air defense should be given more important role in the national defense, he established the Saudi air defense force, and became its first commander. Shortly after occupation of Iraq to Kuwait in the first Persian Gulf War, he was chosen as the commander of the joint Arab forces, and shared an equal position and responsibility with general Norman Schwarzkopf of US Army. King Fahd promoted Prince Khalid to field marshal afterward. In 1991, he retired from the military to focus on business. In January 2001, he was brought back into the military as assistant defense minister for military affairs.

In early 2011, Prince Khalid announced that “more than 70 percent of military equipment can be produced locally" and the future creation of a government branch for domestic military growth. He was regarded as a likely candidate to replace his father as defense minister in 2011. However, he was appointed deputy defense minister in November 2011. His term lasted until 20 April 2013 when he was replaced by Fahd bin Abdullah, another member of the royal family. Traditionally, the decision follows exemption "based on his request," but the royal order issued exempting Khalid bin Sultan from office, did not include this phrase.

== 2009 Yemen bombing ==
In November 2009, Khalid bin Sultan led a Saudi military intervention in Yemen. The campaign had various tactical mistakes, and Khalid was heavily criticized. The Saudis had 130 casualties and Yemen lost over 1000.

In December 2009, Khalid gave a 48-hour ultimatum for Houthi withdrawal from Al Jabri. Soon, he declared that the campaign had ended after the Houthi promised through Al-Quds Al-Arabi they would withdraw from the border in exchange for a ceasefire. The Houthi also stated that the Yemen government had used Saudi territory to bomb targets.

In February 2010, Ambassador Smith met with Khalid. Smith brought attention to Saudi airstrikes on Yemeni hospitals. Khalid admitted that the event occurred because Yemen had designated the area as a Houthi military base. He also stated that this event occurred because of inaccurate military equipment and the U.S. refusal to provide Predators. He went on to state that Saudi strategy was to force the Houthis to reconcile with the Yemeni government by a strong show of military force. He complained that it was difficult to avoid civilian casualties. The Saudi-Yemeni joint committee granted clearances to Khalid bin Sultan for attacks to be conducted. He also stated that Yemeni intelligence was unreliable and politically motivated. Yemen data claimed terrorist positions in a place when in actuality the place was the office of General Ali Mohsen Al Ahmar, a political adversary to President Saleh.

=== Controversy ===
King Abdullah was not pleased by Khalid's leadership when Saudi troops could not quickly push back Houthis who had seized Saudi territory in late 2009. King Abdullah specifically expressed his concerns over the long duration of the conflict, large number of casualties, and Saudi incompetence. Therefore, this situation led to decrease in his potential succession of his father as defense minister. Joseph A. Kéchichian, a Middle East analyst, argued after Khalid's removal from office on 20 April 2013 that there are three potential reasons for his dismissal, one of which is about his activity in 2009 mentioned above. The others were related to his involvement in procurement of arms in 2010 and 2013.

==== Wealth and Paradise Papers ====
Leaked US cables dated November 1996 cited the wealth of Prince Khalid as $2 billion.

In November 2017 an investigation conducted by the International Consortium of Investigative Journalism cited his name in the list of politicians named in Paradise Papers allegations.

== Other positions ==
At the end of the 1990s, Prince Khalid had business contacts with French electronics group Thomson-CSF.

Khalid is the chairman for the committee of the Prince Sultan bin Abdul-Aziz International Prize for Water. He is chair of board of trustees of Sultan bin Abdulaziz Al Saud Foundation. He is also a member of the board of trustees of the Arab Thought Foundation that is a Saudi think-tank group, attempting to improve the relations between Arab nations and the Western nations.

He owned the newspaper Al-Hayat. It is said that he did not interfere in its articles as long as no royal criticism is published.

== Views ==
=== Turkish-Arab relations ===
In the late 1990s, Khalid expressed an opinion concerning the Turkish-Arab relations. According to him, Arabs should ask themselves what brought about this crisis. After criticizing Arab politics for an inability to "cope with rapid changes on the ground," he states how they "assumed Turkey would be on their side forever, even if it gained no benefit thereby." The Arab side, on the other hand, "did not comprehend the complexities of the internal situation in Turkey, or that country's regional and international considerations. This created a climate that could push Turkey ever further into the camp of unfriendly countries." Finally, he proposed improving Turkish-Arab ties "[s]olely by granting supreme importance to mutual economic interests. It is vital to find a form of economic integration between the Arabs and Turks, even if it is a gradual process." And he proposes Turkish-Arab cultural collaboration, calling on Arabs and Turks to "start purging history books and textbooks of mutual insults." He also encouraged military cooperation between Turkey, Pakistan, and Arab states of the Persian Gulf.

=== Ethiopia ===
In February 2013, Khalid made a statement about Ethiopia's right to use the Nile waters, which was officially denounced by the Saudi government. His remarks were as follows: "The Ethiopian Renaissance dam is for political plotting rather than for economic gain and constitutes a threat to Egyptian and Sudanese national security."

== Personal life ==
Khalid's first marriage was to his first cousin, Lulua, King Fahd's daughter. They divorced in 1978. They have three children. Their first child, Reema, died four months old. His other children from his first marriage are Faisal (born 1973) and Sara (born 1976). Later, he married the daughter of Turki bin Abdulaziz, another full uncle, Abeer bint Turki bin Abdulaziz. They have five children: Hala, Fahd (born 1985), Abdullah (born 1988), Salman (born 1993) and Mishail.

One of his daughters, Princess Hala, is the former wife of Turki bin Abdullah, who was then a pilot in the Royal Saudi Air Force, and they married on 13 January 2010.

His son, Faisal bin Khalid, is the governor of the Northern Borders Region. Another son, Abdullah bin Khalid, was the permanent representative of Saudi Arabia to the United Nations in Vienna. He was assigned to the post in September 2019, and his tenure lasted until January 2020 when he was made nonresident ambassador of Saudi Arabia to Slovakia and Slovenia.

== See also ==
- Prince Sultan Advanced Technology Research Institute
