= Bandar bin Sultan Al Saud =

Saudi royal, diplomat, military officer and government official (born 1949)

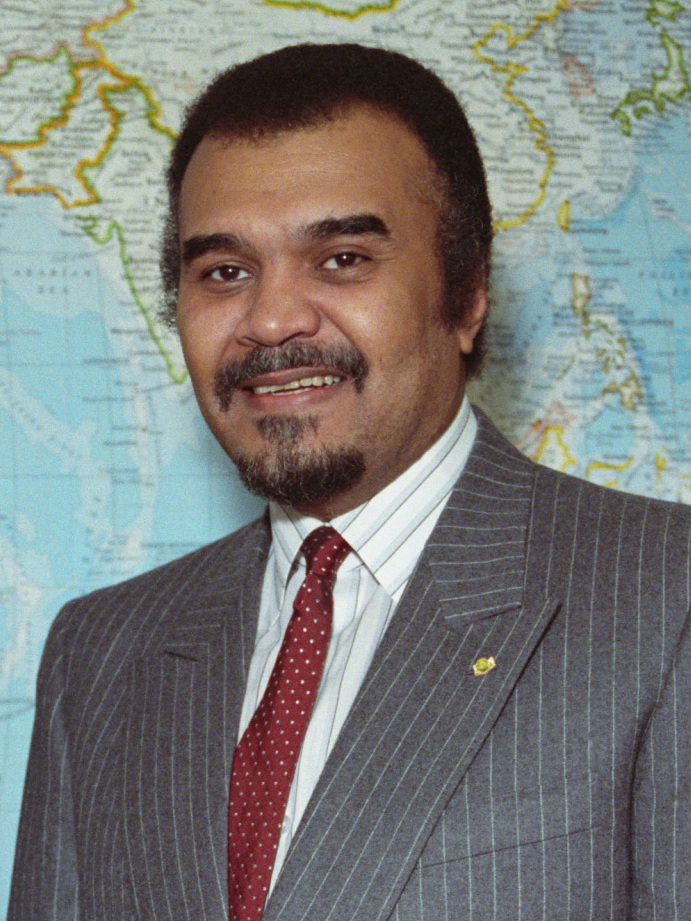
- Prince Bandar in 1993

President of General Intelligence
- Tenure: 19 July 2012 – 15 April 2014
- Predecessor: Muqrin bin Abdulaziz Al Saud
- Successor: Youssef bin Ali Al Idrissi
- Monarch: Abdullah

Secretary General of the National Security Council
- Tenure: 16 October 2005 – 29 January 2015
- Predecessor: Office established
- Successor: Office abolished
- Monarch: Abdullah

Saudi Arabian Ambassador to the United States
- Tenure: 24 October 1983 – 8 September 2005
- Predecessor: Faisal Alhegelan
- Successor: Turki bin Faisal Al Saud
- Monarch: Fahd; Abdullah
- Born: 2 March 1949 (age 77); Ta'if, Saudi Arabia
- Spouse: Haifa bint Faisal
- Issue: 8, including Reema, Khalid and Faisal
Names
- Bandar bin Sultan bin Abdulaziz Al Saud
- House: Al Saud
- Father: Sultan bin Abdulaziz
- Mother: Khiziran
- Education: Royal Air Force College Cranwell; Johns Hopkins University

Bandar bin Sultan Al Saud (Arabic: بندر بن سلطان بن عبد العزيز آل سعود; born 2 March 1949) is a member of the Saudi royal family, military officer, and retired diplomat who served as Saudi Arabia's ambassador to the United States from 1983 to 2005. He is the grandson of Saudi King Abdulaziz.

From 2005 to 2015, Bandar served as secretary general of the National Security Council and was director general of the Saudi Intelligence Agency from 2012 to 2014. From 2014 to 2015, he was King Abdullah's special envoy.

== Early life ==
Bandar is legally stated to have been born on 2 March 1949 in Taif, Saudi Arabia. By his own account, and researchers', his actual date of birth is later. He had reportedly overstated his age on official documents to enter the Royal Saudi Air Force (RSAF) as a teenager.

Bandar's parents were Prince Sultan bin Abdulaziz and his Ethiopian concubine Khiziran, "a commoner from the Asir Province of Saudi Arabia", and he states "I was born out of wedlock and my mother was a concubine ... Under Islamic Sharia law, if you have a slave or a concubine and you make love to her and she doesn't have any children, she stays a slave.... The minute she gets pregnant and you acknowledge it before she has the baby, then it is automatic freedom from slavery."

Prince Bandar disputes she was from Africa and that there were many misconceptions of the issue with the US press. The "unofficial" biographer with unrestricted access, William Simpson, mentions that as a servant girl for a royal of the time, "his mother clearly had been a slave; slavery wasn't abolished in the kingdom until 1962."

Both of Bandar's parents were very young at the time of his birth: his mother Khiziran was just sixteen, and was working as a maid in the palace when she first came in contact with Sultan, who was 23. The royal family provided Khiziran with a generous monthly pension after Bandar was born, but told her to take her child and live with her own family.

Bandar thus spent his early years in a non-royal milieu, living with his mother and aunt nearby, yet had little contact with his father except to see him on weekends, to kiss the Sultan's hand at family gatherings until he was about eight or nine years old, and an awkward "nappy haired and dark skinned" loner with the other 32 half siblings of various wives. By this time, the royal family and the sultan relented to invite Khiziran to bring Bandar with her and live in the palace with Prince Sultan's widowed mother, Hassa bint Ahmed Al Sudairi. Khiziran died in Riyadh in October 2019.

== Education ==
Bandar graduated from the Royal Air Force College Cranwell in 1969. He received additional training at Maxwell Air Force Base and the Industrial College of the Armed Forces. He is a trained pilot and has flown numerous fighter aircraft. Bandar's military career ended in 1977 after he crash-landed his jet and suffered a severe back injury. Afterward, he received a master's degree in international public policy at the Johns Hopkins University's Paul H. Nitze School of Advanced International Studies.

One of his classmates in Cranwell was Bandar bin Faisal, son of King Faisal and his future brother-in-law who graduated in 1967.

== Initial career ==
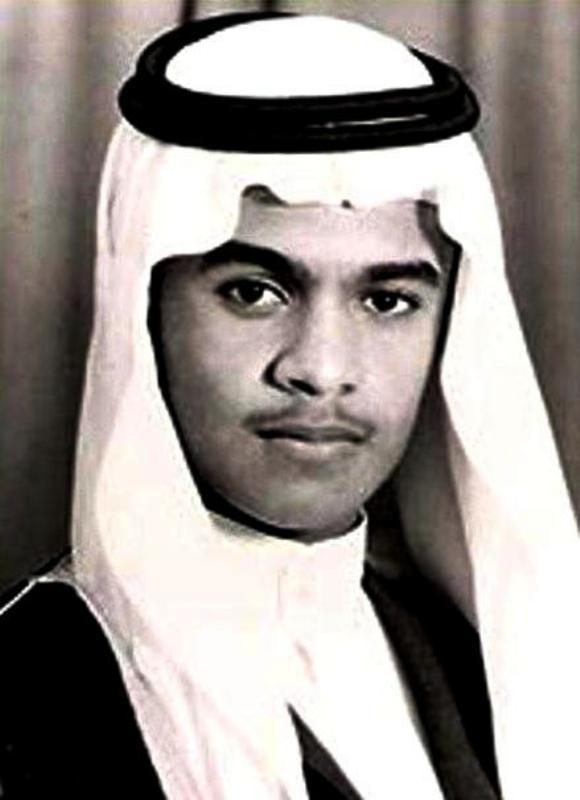
Prince Bandar c. 1980s

In the RSAF, Bandar rose to the rank of lieutenant colonel. His diplomatic career began in 1978 when he was appointed the King Khalid's personal envoy. He successfully lobbied the United States Congress to approve the sale of F-15s to Saudi Arabia. In the Oval Office, U.S. president Jimmy Carter advised him to win the support of then-California governor Ronald Reagan. He did and in exchange helped Carter win the support of Senator James Abourezk for the Panama Canal treaty. Crown Prince Fahd made Bandar an emissary to Carter and granted him permission to act independently of the Saudi-U.S. ambassador.

In 1982, King Fahd made him the military attache at the Saudi Embassy, a move which could have ended his diplomatic career. However, in 1983, Fahd appointed Bandar as Saudi Ambassador to the U.S.

== Ambassador to the United States (1983–2005) ==
On 24 October 1983, Bandar was appointed ambassador to the U.S. by King Fahd, replacing Faisal Alhegelan in the post. During his tenure as ambassador and, before that, the king's personal envoy to Washington, he dealt with five U.S. presidents, ten secretaries of state, eleven national security advisers, sixteen sessions of Congress, and the media. He had extensive influence in the U.S. At the pinnacle of his career, he served both "as the King's exclusive messenger and the White House's errand boy". For over three decades, he was the face of the Saudi Arabia lobby. The U.S. is widely seen as one of Saudi Arabia's most essential allies, but different members of the royal family feel different mixtures of trust and suspicion of the U.S. Therefore, Prince Bandar's intimate relationships with U.S. leaders and policy-makers are considered to be both the source of his power base in the kingdom, as well as the cause of suspicions within the royal family that he is too close to U.S. political figures.

=== Reagan era ===
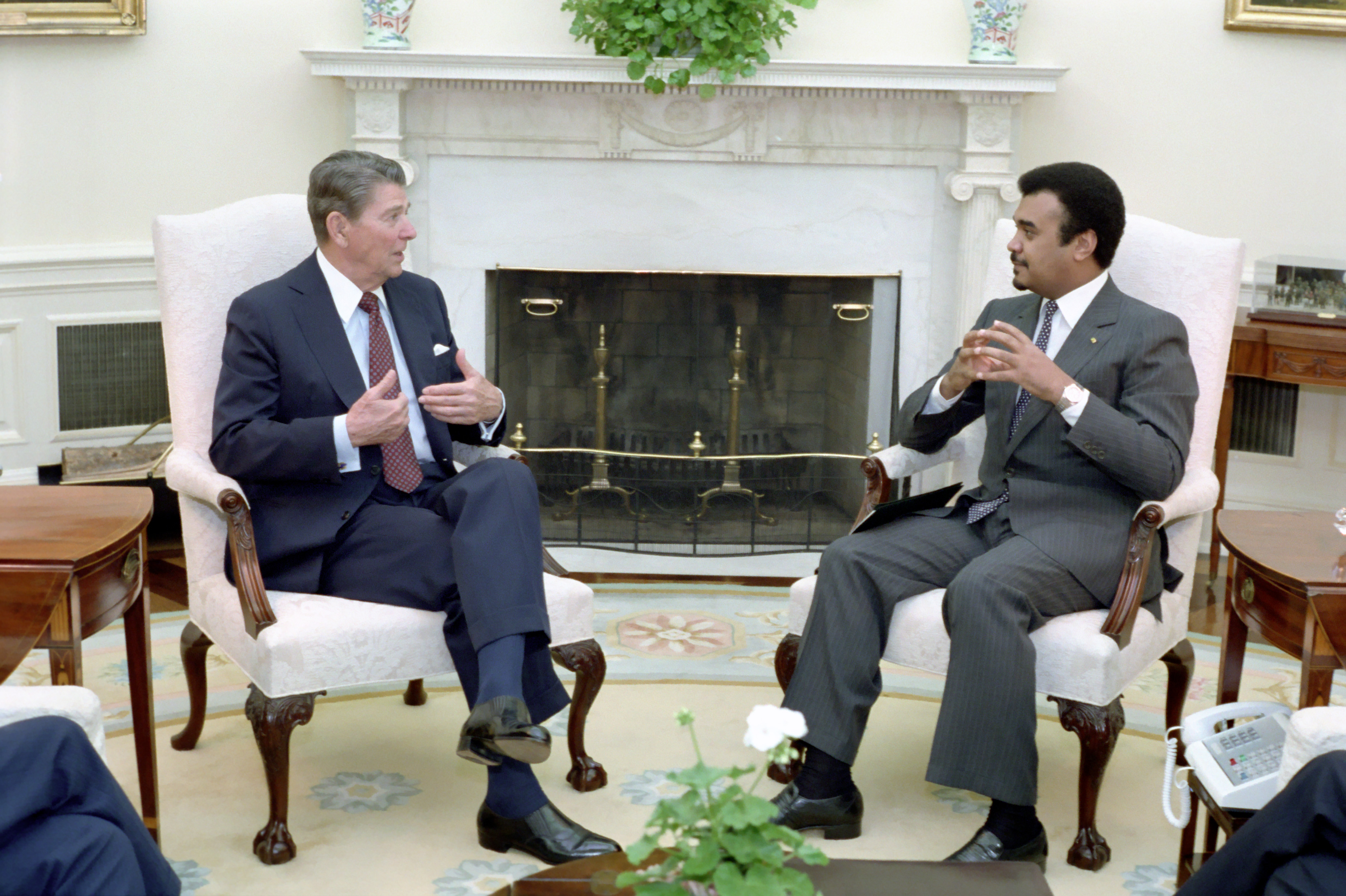
Prince Bandar with U.S. President Ronald Reagan in 1986

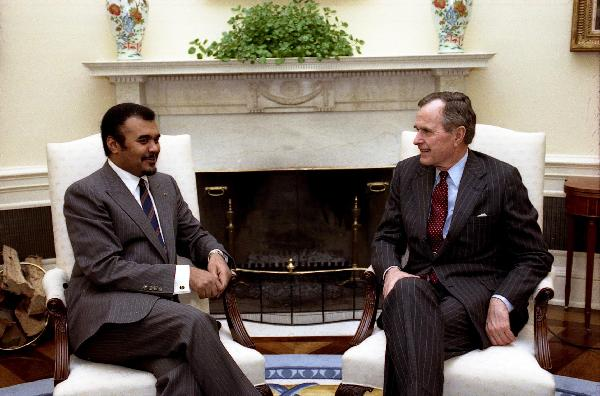
Prince Bandar with US President George H. W. Bush in 1991

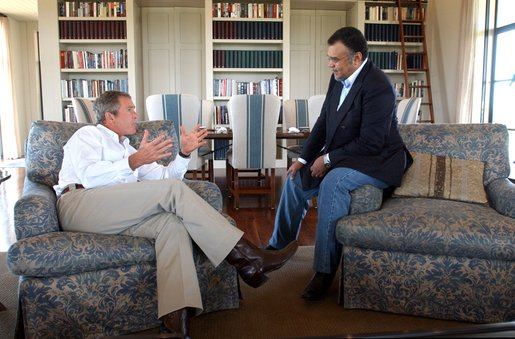
Prince Bandar with US President George W. Bush in 2002

During the Reagan Era, he secured the purchase of AWACs surveillance aircraft despite opposition from the American Israel Public Affairs Committee. The $5.5 billion deal was the beginning of a $200 billion deal for the purchase of American weapons for Saudi Arabia, which included a slush fund that the CIA could direct for its off-the-budget projects. For example, at CIA request, Prince Bandar deposited $10 million in a Vatican bank used to meddle in Italian elections by undermining the Italian Communist Party. The Al-Yamamah arms deal between Britain and Saudi Arabia included diverting hundreds of millions of pounds stretching over more than a decade to Prince Bandar through a Saudi Arabian government bank account at Riggs Bank, but some of the money was used to fund secret CIA projects off-the-budget. According Robert Lacey these payments to Prince Bandar amounted to more than a billion pounds. After the U.S. rejected an arms order, he arranged the delivery of intermediate-range nuclear-warhead-capable missiles from China. This angered the Central Intelligence Agency and the United States Department of State. Pursuant to an understanding with the CIA, Prince Bandar provided $32 million to the U.S.-backed terrorist militants, the Contras, through a Bank of Credit and Commerce International (BCCI) account, as part of what later became known as the Iran-Contra scandal. Nancy Reagan used him to relay messages to the Cabinet.

=== Clinton era ===
Bill Clinton, as governor of Arkansas, had asked him to help pay for the Middle East Studies Center at the University of Arkansas. In the 1990s, he persuaded Libyan president Muammar Gaddafi to turn in two suspects allegedly involved in the 1988 bombing of Pan Am Flight 103. He privately described Gaddafi as "a Jerry Lewis trying to be a Churchill".

During Clinton's presidency, in September 1993, Prince Bandar was appointed Dean of the Diplomatic Corps, and he continued the role until the second term of George W. Bush's presidency.

=== Bush presidencies ===
Bandar formed close relationships with several American presidents, notably George H. W. Bush and George W. Bush, his closeness to the latter gaining him the affectionate and controversial nickname 'Bandar Bush'. His particularly close relationship with the Bush family was highlighted in Michael Moore's documentary Fahrenheit 9/11. He was reportedly so close to George H. W. Bush that he was often described as a member of the former president's family. He advocated Saddam Hussein's overthrow in Iraq in March 2003. He encouraged military action against Iraq and supported Dick Cheney's agenda for "The New Middle East", which called for pro-democracy programs in both Syria and Iran.

=== Resignation ===
On 26 June 2005, Bandar submitted his resignation as ambassador to the United States for "personal reasons". The official end date of his term was 8 September 2005. Bandar returned to Saudi Arabia weeks prior to the death of King Fahd, upon which Bandar's father, Sultan bin Abdulaziz, became the nation's crown prince. It was rumored that Bandar's return was timed in order to secure a position in the new government.

Prince Bandar was succeeded as ambassador by Prince Turki Al Faisal. Nevertheless, even after leaving the ambassadorship, Bandar continued to maintain strong relationships within the Bush administration and to meet with high-ranking White House staff even after Prince Turki took over the post; Turki gave up the ambassador's job after only 18 months.

== Secretary General of National Security Council (2005–2015) ==
In October 2005, King Abdullah appointed Bandar bin Sultan as secretary-general of the newly created National Security Council.

Bandar secretly met with U.S. officials in 2006 after resigning as ambassador. Seymour Hersh reported in 2007 in The New Yorker that as Saudi Arabia's national security adviser, Bandar continued to meet privately with both George W. Bush and Vice President Dick Cheney. At that time Hersh described Bandar as a key architect of the Bush administration policy in Iraq and the Middle East.

On 25 January 2007, Saudi Arabia sent Bandar to Iran for discussions on the crisis in Lebanon and the Kingdom even held talks with Hizballah leaders, whom he had invited for the annual pilgrimage to Mecca. After tensions with Qatar over supplying rebel groups, Saudi Arabia (under Bandar's leadership of its Syria policy) switched its efforts from Turkey to Jordan in 2012, using its financial leverage over Jordan to develop training facilities there, with Bandar sending his half-brother and deputy Salman bin Sultan to oversee them.

Bandar's tenure as secretary general was extended for four years on 3 September 2009. His term ended on 29 January 2015. The office was also abolished on the same day.

=== Disappearance and rumors ===
After King Abdullah renewed Bandar's post on the National Security Council for an additional 4-year term in September 2009, Bandar failed to make the customary public demonstration of his allegiance to him. This noticeable absence was followed by others: an avid fan of the Dallas Cowboys, Bandar did not appear in his customary seat—next to owner Jerry Jones in Jones's skybox—for the home opener of the new Cowboys Stadium. In October 2009, he was not present in King Abdullah's delegation for a watershed Damascus visit. Most notably, in December 2009, Prince Bandar was not present for the return of his father, Crown Prince Sultan, from Morocco. After that event, journalists began to report on Bandar's disappearance, noting that his last appearance in public had been with King Abdullah in Jeddah on 10 December 2008.

Hugh Miles of the London Review of Books reported rumors that Bandar was undergoing surgery at the Johns Hopkins Hospital in Baltimore. Bandar's lawyer denied these rumors; he has no spokesman.

Le Figaro reported that Bandar had been in a hospital in France, and was recuperating in Morocco.

Iran's Press TV reported that Bandar was under house arrest for an attempted coup. Saudi opposition sources said he was in Dhaban Prison. Some rumors alleged that his coup was exposed by Russian intelligence services because of his frequent trips to Moscow to encourage cooperation against Iran.

In October 2010, Middle East analyst Simon Henderson reported in Foreign Policy that Prince Bandar had made his first public appearance in almost two years. Citing official Saudi media, Henderson reported that Bandar had been greeted at the airport by "a virtual who's who of Saudi political figures." Henderson noted that no explanation had been given for the Prince's whereabouts for the previous two years—the only detail was that he had returned "from abroad." Henderson and other analysts viewed this reemergence as a sign of Bandar's rehabilitation into the active politics of the kingdom.

In what was perceived as a return to prominence, in March 2011, Bandar was sent to Pakistan, India, Malaysia, and China to gather support for Saudi Arabia's military intervention in Bahrain. In April 2011, Bandar was present in meetings when U.S. Secretary of Defense Robert Gates visited King Abdullah and in a separate visit by National Security Advisor Tom Donilon.

The other goal of his late March 2011 visit to Islamabad was to raise the prospect of a return engagement for the Pakistan Army. The goal was achieved, and Pakistan quickly approved the proposal. His visit to China during the same period resulted in the issuing of lucrative contracts in return for political support. Since China was not a friend of the Arab Spring, it was eager for Saudi oil and investment. Bandar secretly negotiated the first big Saudi-Chinese arms deal. Thus, Bandar was the Kingdom's premier China expert.

== Director General of Saudi Intelligence Agency (2012–2014) ==
Bandar was appointed director general of Saudi Intelligence Agency on 19 July 2012 replacing Muqrin bin Abdulaziz. Although no official reason for the appointment was provided, the appointment occurred after growing tension between Sunnis and Shiites in the Eastern Province of Saudi Arabia. It was also considered as a move of Saudi Arabia to display more aggressive foreign policy given the regional challenges that came from Iran and Syria. Prince Bandar is also a member of the Military Service Council.

Bandar organised the visit of Manaf Tlass, who defected from Syria on 6 July 2012, to Saudi Arabia in the last week of July 2012.

In 2013, Bandar said that the Saudis would "shift away" from the U.S. over Syrian and Iranian policy.

According to a number of articles, Bandar, allegedly confronted Russian president Vladimir Putin in a bid to break the deadlock over Syria. This included security of the 2014 Winter Olympics in Sochi if there was no accord. "I can give you a guarantee to protect the Winter Olympics next year. The Chechen groups that threaten the security of the games are controlled by us," he allegedly said. Putin then rejected the proposal furiously by saying "we know that you have supported the Chechen terrorist groups for a decade. And that support, which you have frankly talked about just now, is completely incompatible with the common objectives of fighting global terrorism that you mentioned."

Bandar had been tasked with managing Saudi policy in the Syrian civil war, but he was replaced in early 2014 by interior minister Prince Muhammad bin Nayef. Bandar took a confrontational tone with the U.S. and was called a "problem" privately by U.S. Secretary of State John Kerry. However, Bandar had also been struggling with poor health stemming from the 1977 plane crash, leading to speculation that this was why he was replaced.

Iraqi Prime Minister Nouri al-Maliki reportedly complained about secret Saudi Arabian support for militant groups, saying: "They are attacking Iraq, through Syria and in a direct way, and they announced war on Iraq, as they announced it on Syria, and unfortunately it is on a sectarian and political basis."

=== Assassination rumors ===
In July 2012, the rumours of his assassination were reported by DEBKAfile and later published in Tehran Times. This news was denied by Arab News and the journalist David Ignatius.

In August 2013, The Wall Street Journal reported that Bandar had been appointed to lead Saudi Arabia's efforts to topple Syrian President Bashar al-Assad. According these reports Bandar acted as the lynchpin in arming the jihadis fighting Assad. The CIA considered this a sign of how serious Saudi Arabia was about this aim. The Journal reported that in late 2012 Saudi intelligence, under Bandar's direction, began efforts to convince the U.S. that the Assad government was using chemical weapons.

Bandar was also described as "jetting from covert command centers near the Syrian front lines to the Élysée Palace in Paris and the Kremlin in Moscow, seeking to undermine the Assad regime." He had a simple message: my kingdom has the money needed to defeat Assad—and we're ready to use it.

On 15 April 2014, Bandar was removed from his position "at his own request" according to the announcement in the Saudi state media. He remained as secretary general of the National Security Council until it was abolished in January 2015.

== Views ==
Bandar considers himself an American Hamiltonian conservative. Before the 2000 U.S. presidential election was decided, he invited George H. W. Bush to go pheasant shooting on his English estate in a "Desert Storm reunion". After the September 11 attacks in 2001, in an interview in The New York Times, he stated: "[Osama] bin Laden used to come to us when America, through the CIA and Saudi Arabia, were helping our brother mujahideen in Afghanistan to get rid of the communist secularist Soviet Union forces. Osama bin Laden came and said 'Thank you. Thank you for bringing the Americans to help us.' At that time, I thought he couldn't lead eight ducks across the street."

Bandar argued some researchers "learn to speak a few words of Arabic and call themselves experts about the affairs of my country."

== Honours and awards ==
Bandar is the recipient of the Order of Abdulaziz Al Saud, the Hawk Flying Medal of Aviation, and the King Faisal Medal. In 2001, he was awarded an honorary degree of doctor of law by Howard University.

== Controversy ==
Bandar endured controversy over allegations in the book Plan of Attack by Bob Woodward that George W. Bush informed him of the decision to invade Iraq ahead of Secretary of State Colin Powell.

Bandar helped negotiate the 1985 Al Yamamah deal, a series of massive arms sales by the UK to Saudi Arabia worth £40 billion, including the sale of more than 100 warplanes. After the deal was signed, British arms manufacturer British Aerospace (now BAE Systems) allegedly funnelled secret payments of at least £1 billion into two Saudi embassy accounts in Washington, in yearly installments of up to £120 million over at least 10 years. He allegedly took money for personal use out of the accounts, as the purpose of one of the accounts was to pay the operating expenses of his private Airbus A340. According to investigators, there was "no distinction between the accounts of the embassy, or official government accounts [...], and the accounts of the royal family." The payments were discovered during a Serious Fraud Office investigation, which was stopped in December 2006 by attorney general Lord Goldsmith. In 2009, he hired Louis Freeh as his legal representative during the scandal.

A court affidavit filed on 3 February 2015 claims that Zacarias Moussaoui was a courier between Osama bin Laden and Turki bin Faisal Al Saud in the late 1990s, and that Turki introduced Moussaoui to Bandar. Zacarias Moussaoui stated on oath and wrote to Judge George B. Daniels that Saudi royal family members, including Prince Bandar, donated to Al-Qaeda and helped finance the 11 September attacks (9/11). The Saudi government continues to deny any involvement in the 9/11 plot, and claims there is no evidence to support Moussaoui's allegations in spite of numerous previous intense investigations, noting that Moussaoui's own lawyers presented evidence of his mental incompetence during his trial.

== Personal life ==
In 1972, Bandar married Haifa bint Faisal, his half-first cousin, with whom he had eight children: four sons and four daughters.

His daughter Princess Reema bint Bandar, who was formerly married to Faisal bin Turki bin Nasser Al Saud, is the Saudi Arabian Ambassador to the U.S., being the first woman to hold such position in the Kingdom. His son Khalid was the Saudi Arabian Ambassador to the U.K. and is married to Lucy Cuthbert, niece of Ralph Percy, 12th Duke of Northumberland. Another of his sons, Faisal, has been the president of the Saudi Arabian Federation for Electronic and Intellectual Sports (SAFEIS) and the Arab eSports Federation since 2017.

=== Habits and health concerns ===
Known for his cigar smoking, he usually wears European clothes, and he likes American colloquialisms and American history. In the mid-1990s, he suffered his first depression. His health problems were reported to have continued into the 2010s, often being treated abroad.

=== Property ===
He travels frequently on his private Airbus A340. He owned Glympton Park, Oxfordshire, until March 2021, when he sold the property to the King of Bahrain’s family.

Bandar owned an estate with a 32-room house in Aspen, Colorado. He bought the land in 1989 and built the residence in 1991. On 12 July 2006, it was reported that Prince Bandar was seeking to sell his 56,000-square-foot (5,200 m^{2}) mansion in Aspen, Colorado, for US$135 million. The palatial vacation home, called Hala Ranch, is larger than the White House, and is perched on a mountaintop of 95 acres (380,000 m^{2}). It includes 15 bedrooms and 16 bathrooms, and features 24-karat gold fixtures. In December 2006, the mansion was still listed for sale at $135 million. In December 2007, the 14,395-square-foot (1,337.3 m^{2}) guesthouse was sold for a reported $36.5 m. The purported reason for the sale is that Bandar was too busy to enjoy the mansion. Finally, he sold his Aspen ranch for $49 million to Starwood Mountain Ranch LLC in June 2012. It is reported that billionaire John Paulson bought Hala Ranch, and Paulson confirmed this.

=== Membership ===
Bandar is a board member of the Sultan bin Abdulaziz Al Saud Foundation.

=== Donations ===
In 1990, Bandar donated an unknown amount to finance construction of the Oxford Centre for Islamic Studies (OCIS) in Oxford, England.
