= Badr bin Sultan Al Saud =

Saudi royal and government official (born 1980)

Governor of Al Jawf Province
- In office: 27 February 2018 - 27 December 2018
- Predecessor: Fahad bin Badr bin Abdulaziz Al Saud
- Successor: Faisal bin Nawwaf bin Abdulaziz Al Saud

Deputy Governor of Mecca Province
- In office: 27 December 2018 - 12 December 2023
- Successor: Saud bin Mishaal Al Saud
- Born: 1980 (age 45–46)
- Issue: Princess Al Jawhara; Prince Khalid; Princess Haya
- Badr bin Sultan bin Abdulaziz bin Abdul Rahman Al Saud
- House: Al Saud
- Father: Sultan bin Abdulaziz Al Saud
- Mother: Hoda bint Abdullah bin Mohammed Al Sheikh

Badr bin Sultan bin Abdulaziz Al Saud (Arabic: بدر بن سلطان بن عبد العزيز آل سعود; born 1980) is a member of the House of Saud, one of the grandsons of Saudi Arabia's founder King Abdulaziz. He was former governor of Al-Jouf Province and former deputy governor of Mecca Province.

== Biography ==
Prince Badr was born in 1980. His parents are Prince Sultan and Hoda bint Abdullah bin Mohammed Al Sheikh.

On 27 February 2018, Prince Badr was named as governor of the Al-Jouf Province at the rank of minister succeeding Fahad bin Badr bin Abdulaziz Al Saud in the post. Prince Badr's tenure ended on 27 December 2018 when Faisal bin Nawaf was appointed to the post. Prince Badr was named deputy governor of Mecca Province in the same reshuffle. His tenure ended on 12 December 2023, when Saud bin Mishaal Al Saud was named as the deputy governor of the province.

Prince Badr is one of the board members of Sultan bin Abdulaziz Al Saud Foundation.

He married a daughter of Prince Ahmed bin Abdulaziz in 2015, and has three children with her: Princess Al-Jawhara, Prince Khalid, and Princess Haya
