= Abdullah bin Khalid Al Saud =

Saudi royal and diplomat (born 1988)

HRH Prince Abdullah bin Khalid bin Sultan
- عبد الله بن خالد بن سلطان آل سعود
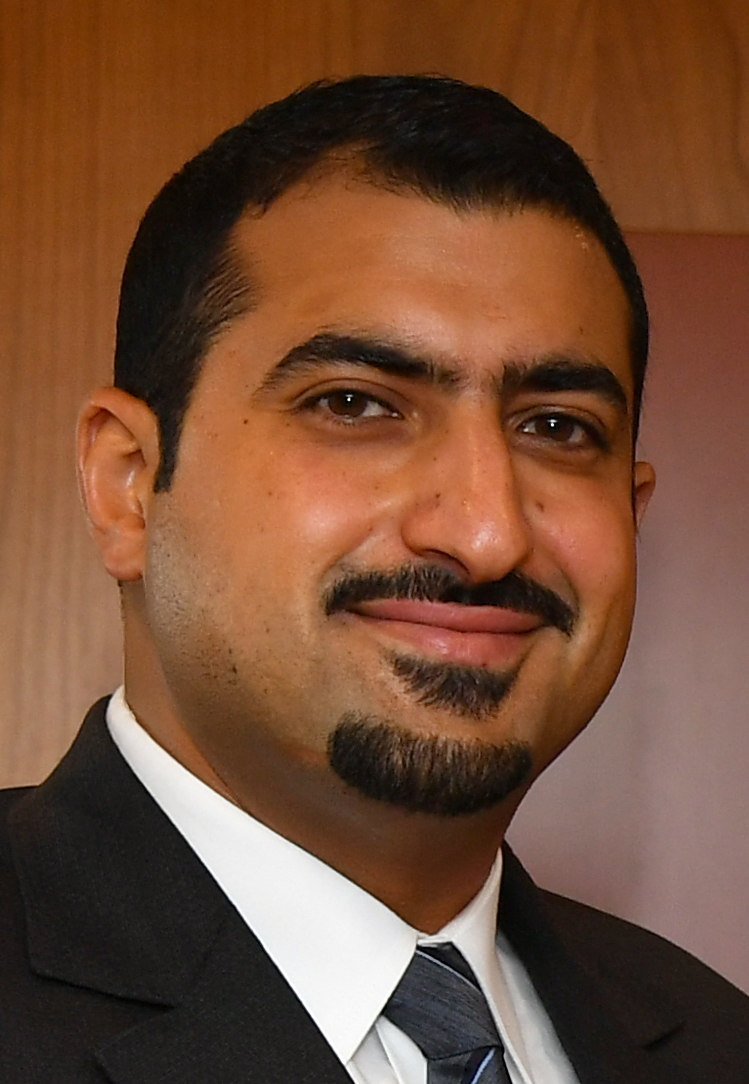

Ambassador of Saudi Arabia to the United Kingdom
- Incumbent
- Assumed office February 2026
- Monarch: Salman
- Preceded by: Khalid bin Bandar Al Saud

Ambassador of Saudi Arabia to Germany
- In office 2023–2026
- Monarch: Salman
- Preceded by: Essam bin Ibrahim Al-Baital

Ambassador of Saudi Arabia to Austria
- In office 2019–2023
- Monarch: Salman
- Preceded by: Khalid bin Ibrahim Al-Jindan
- Succeeded by: Abdullah bin Khaled Toula

Personal details
- Born: 13 February 1988 (age 38)
- Parents: Prince Khalid bin Sultan (father); Princess Abeer bint Turki bin Abdulaziz Al Saud (mother)
- Education: Columbia University (BA); MIT Sloan School of Management (MBA)

Abdullah bin Khalid Al Saud (Arabic: عبد الله بن خالد بن سلطان آل سعود) (born 13 February 1988) is a member of the House of Saud and has served as the Saudi ambassador to the United Kingdom since February 2026. He previously served as the Saudi ambassador to Germany between 2023 and 2026 and as the Saudi ambassador to Austria between 2019 and 2023.

== Biography ==
Abdullah bin Khalid bin Sultan was born in 1988 to Khalid bin Sultan Al Saud, former Saudi deputy minister of defense and commander of the joint Arab forces during the Gulf War. He graduated from Columbia University in 2010 with a bachelor's degree in economics and obtained his master's degree in business management from MIT Sloan School of Management in 2015.

He previously served as Saudi Arabia's ambassador to Austria, non-resident ambassador to Slovenia and Slovakia, and the country's permanent delegate to the United Nations and international organizations in Vienna from 2019 to 2023.

As Saudi Arabia's representative to the International Atomic Energy Agency, he has called for a comprehensive international agreement and intensified inspections of Iran's nuclear program.

In May 2023, he was appointed as Saudi Arabia's ambassador to Germany and presented his credentials to Germany's president, Frank-Walter Steinmeier at a ceremony in Bellevue Palace. During the ceremony, he affirmed the Kingdom of Saudi Arabia's keenness to strengthen relations of friendship and cooperation with the Federal Republic of Germany.

In December 2024, he sold The Holme, a property in Regent's Park, London, to Zedra, a Luxembourgish corporate services firm which manages investments, in a deal with estate agent, Knight Frank, for £139 million. The property was put into receivership and the sale was enforced due to arrears from a £160 million loan secured against the property.

In January 2026, he appointed as Saudi Arabia's ambassador to the United Kingdom. He presented his credentials to King Charles III in February 2026.

He has served as an adviser to the Royal Court since 2017, a member of the executive committee of the National Air Services holding company, and a director of the Equestrian Club of Riyadh.
