= National Security Council (Saudi Arabia) =

Formerly the security agency in Saudi Arabia

Saudi National Security Council
Agency overview
- Formed: 2005
- Dissolved: 29 January 2015
- Agency executives: King Abdullah bin Abdulaziz Al Saud, Chairman; Prince Bandar bin Sultan, Secretary General

The Saudi National Security Council (SNSC) (Arabic: مجلس الأمن الوطني) was the body in charge of coordinating Saudi Arabia's national security, intelligence and foreign policy strategy. It was established in 2005 by King Abdullah bin Abdulaziz Al Saud. The first secretary general of the SNSC was Prince Bandar bin Sultan, the former Saudi Ambassador to the United States. The assistant secretary general of the SNSC was Prince Salman bin Sultan until 6 August 2013. The council was abolished by King Salman on 29 January 2015.

== History ==
The National Security Council was formed on 16 October 2005 by the newly crowned King Abdullah in response to major geopolitical shifts in the Middle East region. The occupation of Iraq made the region "a center for reconstruction, globalization and reorganization" with the entry of the United States as a major player. In addition to its regional influence in the Arabian Peninsula, Saudi Arabia is one of the leading actors in the Islamic world and has a central role in global energy policy.

== Role ==
The Council was formed to act as an organizational mechanism that coordinates the Kingdom's internal and external policies relating to national security, enabling it to respond effectively to rapidly changing domestic, regional and international environments. It had the power to declare war and investigate security agencies if they were involved in acts that threaten national security.

Despite the formation of the Council, as with other Saudi government institutions, major national security decisions would continue to be taken by the most senior members of the royal family.

== Membership ==
The SNSC was chaired by the King (who is also Prime Minister), with the Crown Prince (who is also Deputy Prime Minister) as deputy chairman. Its affairs are coordinated by a permanent Secretary General. At the time of its formation, other members included the Minister of the Interior, Minister of Foreign Affairs, Deputy Commander of the Saudi Arabian National Guard and head of the General Intelligence Presidency. Late Prince Nayef, then interior minister, served as the deputy head of the SNSC.

Final membership of the Saudi National Security Council
Chairman	King Abdullah
Deputy Chairman	Crown Prince Salman
Secretary General	Prince Bandar bin Sultan
Minister of Foreign Affairs	Prince Saud bin Faisal
General Intelligence President	Prince Khalid bin Bandar
National Guard Minister	Prince Mutaib bin Abdullah
Minister of Interior	Prince Mohammed bin Nayef

== Dissolution ==
King Salman dissolved the NSC on 29 January 2015.
