= Sultan bin Abdulaziz =

Saudi royal and politician (1925–2011)

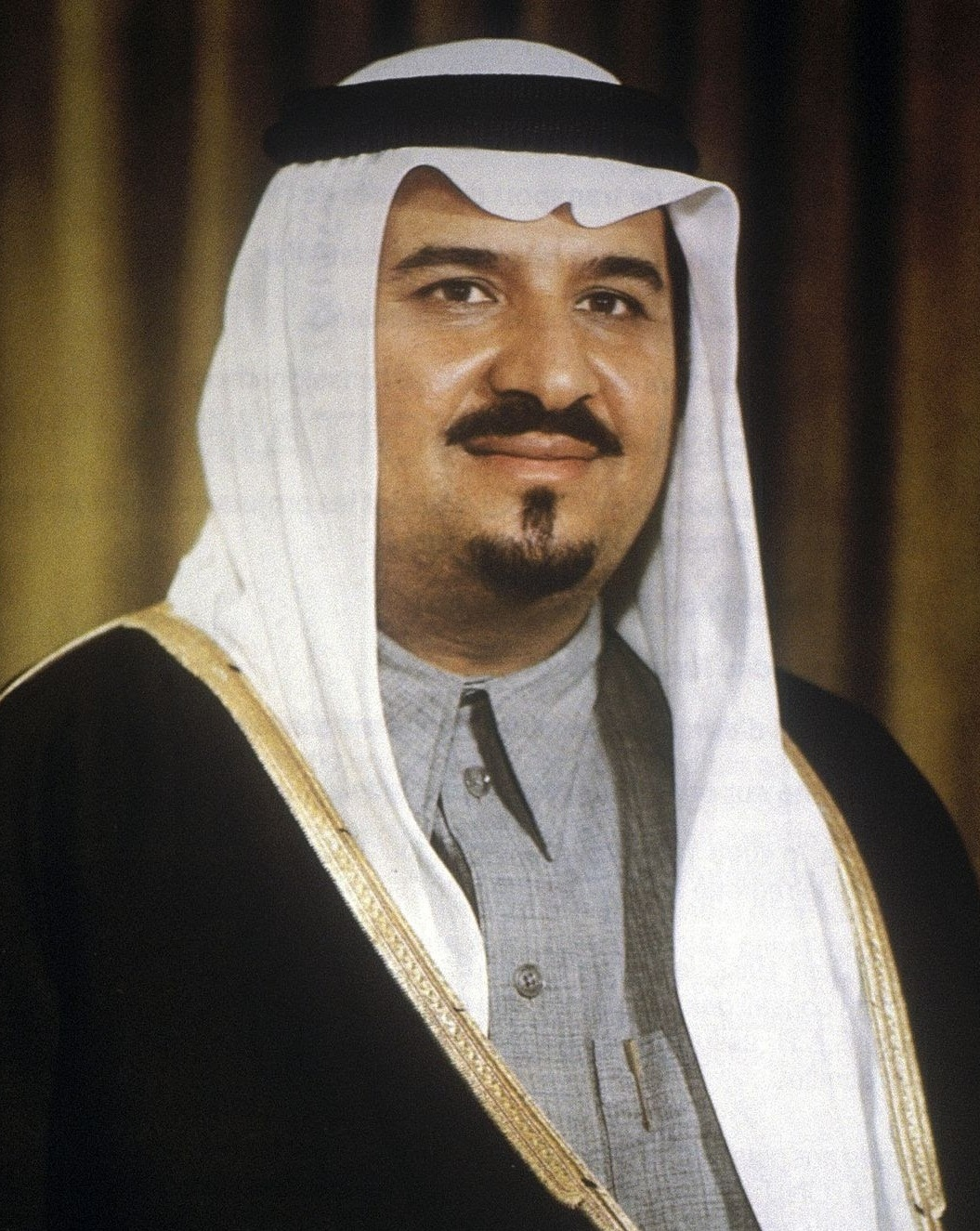

Crown Prince of Saudi Arabia First Deputy Prime Minister
- Tenure: 1 August 2005 – 22 October 2011
- Monarch: Abdullah
- Prime Minister: King Abdullah
- Predecessor: Abdullah bin Abdulaziz
- Successor: Nayef bin Abdulaziz

Second Deputy Prime Minister
- Tenure: 13 June 1982 – 1 August 2005
- Monarch: Fahd
- Prime Minister: King Fahd
- Predecessor: Abdullah bin Abdulaziz
- Successor: Nayef bin Abdulaziz

Minister of Defense and Aviation
- Tenure: 22 October 1963 – 22 October 2011
- Deputy: Turki II bin Abdulaziz Al Saud; Abdul Rahman bin Abdulaziz Al Saud
- Prime Minister: See list: Saud of Saudi Arabia King Faisal Khalid of Saudi Arabia Fahd of Saudi Arabia King Abdullah
- Predecessor: Muhammed bin Saud Al Saud
- Successor: Salman of Saudi Arabia

Governor of Riyadh Province
- Tenure: 22 February 1947 – 24 December 1953
- Appointed by: King Abdulaziz
- Predecessor: Nasser bin Abdulaziz Al Saud
- Successor: Nayef bin Abdulaziz
- Born: 5 January 1925; Riyadh, Kingdom of Hejaz and Nejd
- Died: 22 October 2011 (aged 86); New York City, New York, U.S.
- Burial: 25 October 2011; Al Oud cemetery, Riyadh
- Spouse: See list
- Issue: List: Noura bin Sultan; Fahd bin Sultan Al Saud; Bandar bin Sultan Al Saud; Khalid bin Sultan Al Saud; Turki bin Sultan Al Saud; Salman bin Sultan Al Saud; Badr bin Sultan Al Saud
Names
- Sultan bin Abdulaziz bin Abdul Rahman bin Faisal bin Turki bin Abdullah bin Muhammad bin Saud
- House: Al Saud
- Father: King Abdulaziz
- Mother: Hussa bint Ahmed Al Sudairi

Sultan bin Abdulaziz Al Saud (Arabic: سلطان بن عبدالعزيز آل سعود, Sulṭān ibn ʿAbdulʿazīz Āl Suʿūd; (5 January 1925 – 22 October 2011), called The generous Sultan (سلطان الخير, Sulṭan al Khair) in Saudi Arabia, was the Saudi defense minister from 1963 to 2011 and the Crown Prince of Saudi Arabia from 2005 until his death in October 2011.

== Early life and education ==
Sultan was born in Riyadh sometime between the mid to late 1920s to early 1930s, with the year being given as 1925, 1928, 1930, and 1931. He was the 15th son of Ibn Saud and his mother was Hussa bint Ahmed Al Sudairi. He was the second of the Sudairi Seven, who also included Fahd, Nayef and Salman. Prince Sultan, along with many of his brothers, received his early education in religion, modern culture, and diplomacy at the royal court.

== Early experience ==
His career in public service began in 1940 when he was made a deputy to Riyadh governor or emir, Prince Nasser. In 1947, Prince Sultan replaced Prince Nasser as governor of Riyadh. Prince Sultan also assisted King Abdulaziz's attempts to establish a national administrative system based on the Islamic Sharia law during this period. In 1947, Prince Sultan oversaw ARAMCO's construction of the Kingdom's rail link between Dammam and Riyadh. It was upon his advice King Abdulaziz ibn Saud ordered the dismantling of Riyadh's city walls in the early 1950s that eventually resulted in the expansion and urbanization of the town into a modern metropolis. He was appointed as the kingdom's first minister of agriculture in 1953 and minister of transport in 1955.

Following the assassination of Lebanese prime minister, Riad Al Solh, in 1951 King Abdulaziz sent Prince Sultan to Beirut to offer condolences to late prime minister's family.

Although the direct military experience of Prince Sultan was brief, heading the Royal Guard in Riyadh in the early 1950s, he felt a lifelong connection to the military and the cause of Saudi independence from an early age. Major General Carl von Horn, Swedish commander of the UN observer mission during the Yemeni civil war, described the Prince Sultan as "a volatile and emotional young man" in the early days.

== Minister of defense and aviation ==
In 1963, Crown Prince Faisal appointed Prince Sultan as minister of defense and aviation. He presided over the development of the Saudi armed forces. During the reign of King Faisal, Prince Sultan was particularly interested in Yemen.

At the beginning of King Faisal's reign in 1964 Prince Sultan became a member of the council which had been established by the king to guide the succession issues. In the late 1966 Prince Sultan survived an assassination attempt by the revolutionary Yemenites who were assisted by Egyptian intelligence. His influence declined under the reign of King Khalid due to the fact that in 1977 Prince Sultan unsuccessfully tried to prevent Prince Abdullah bin Abdulaziz from becoming heir apparent when the king died.

Sultan purchased U.S. tanks, fighter planes, missiles, and AWACS (airborne warning and control systems). However, as a result of problems assimilating technology within its armed forces, a relatively high proportion of the military equipment is stored or under maintenance, despite a large portion of Saudi's $34 billion defense budget being spent on maintaining military equipment. Sultan allegedly became extraordinarily wealthy from kickbacks by Western businesses that handled multibillion-dollar defense contracts. He was involved in many scandals, including the Al Yamamah deal. However, his influence remained unhindered until his health began to deteriorate. During his tenure, Saudi Arabia became the largest importer of U.S. arms, and he was a strong proponent of the U.S.-Saudi partnership.

As well, Sultan authorized a deal with the British Aircraft Corporation (BAC) in 1965. His program, called Operation Magic Carpet, traded £16 million for six second-hand Lightnings, six Hawker Hunters, and a set of missile launchers going to Royal Saudi Air Force. Geoffrey Edwards served as the official intermediary. British pilots also came over, privately contracted. Prince Sultan was an expert on the Yemen civil war and Soviet involvement in the Horn of Africa in 1985.

In 1996, Prince Sultan opposed Pentagon plans to relocate U.S. troops to safer locations after the Dhahran complex bombings. He visited Iran in May 1999 - his visit was the first official visit of a Saudi minister since 1979.

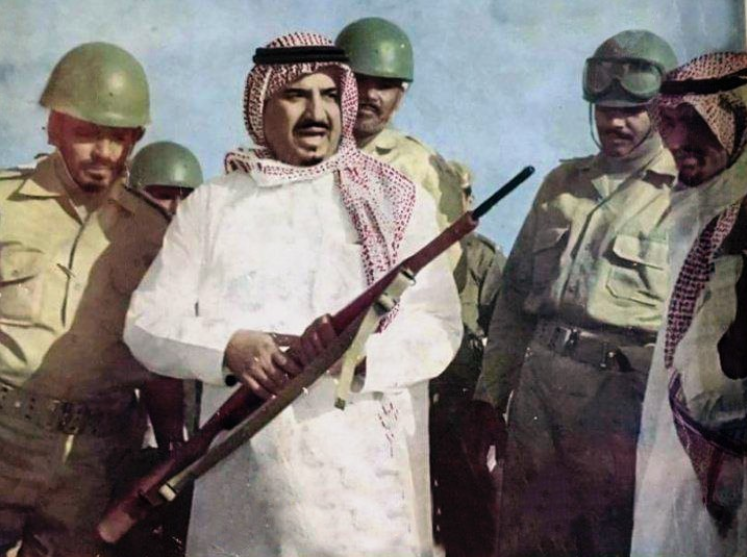
Prince Sultan meeting with Saudi soldiers in the 1960s.

== Second deputy prime minister ==
On 13 June 1982, after the death of King Khalid and Crown Prince Fahd became the King, Prince Sultan was appointed second deputy prime minister. Opposition to his appointment as second deputy prime minister came in particular from his elder half-brothers Musaid and Bandar. The objection of Prince Musaid was easily ignored since his son, Faisal bin Musaid, had assassinated King Faisal. However, the interests of Bandar bin Abdulaziz were much harder to ignore. Thus, he was compensated and the dispute was resolved.

Prince Sultan, in December 1995, attempted to seize power through the support of the Ulema when Crown Prince Abdullah was in Oman for a summit of the Gulf Cooperation Council. However, his attempted coup failed.

Prince Sultan was one of the members of the Al Saud Family Council established by Crown Prince Abdullah in June 2000 to discuss private issues such as business activities of princes and marriages of princess to individuals who were not members of the House of Saud.

== Crown prince ==
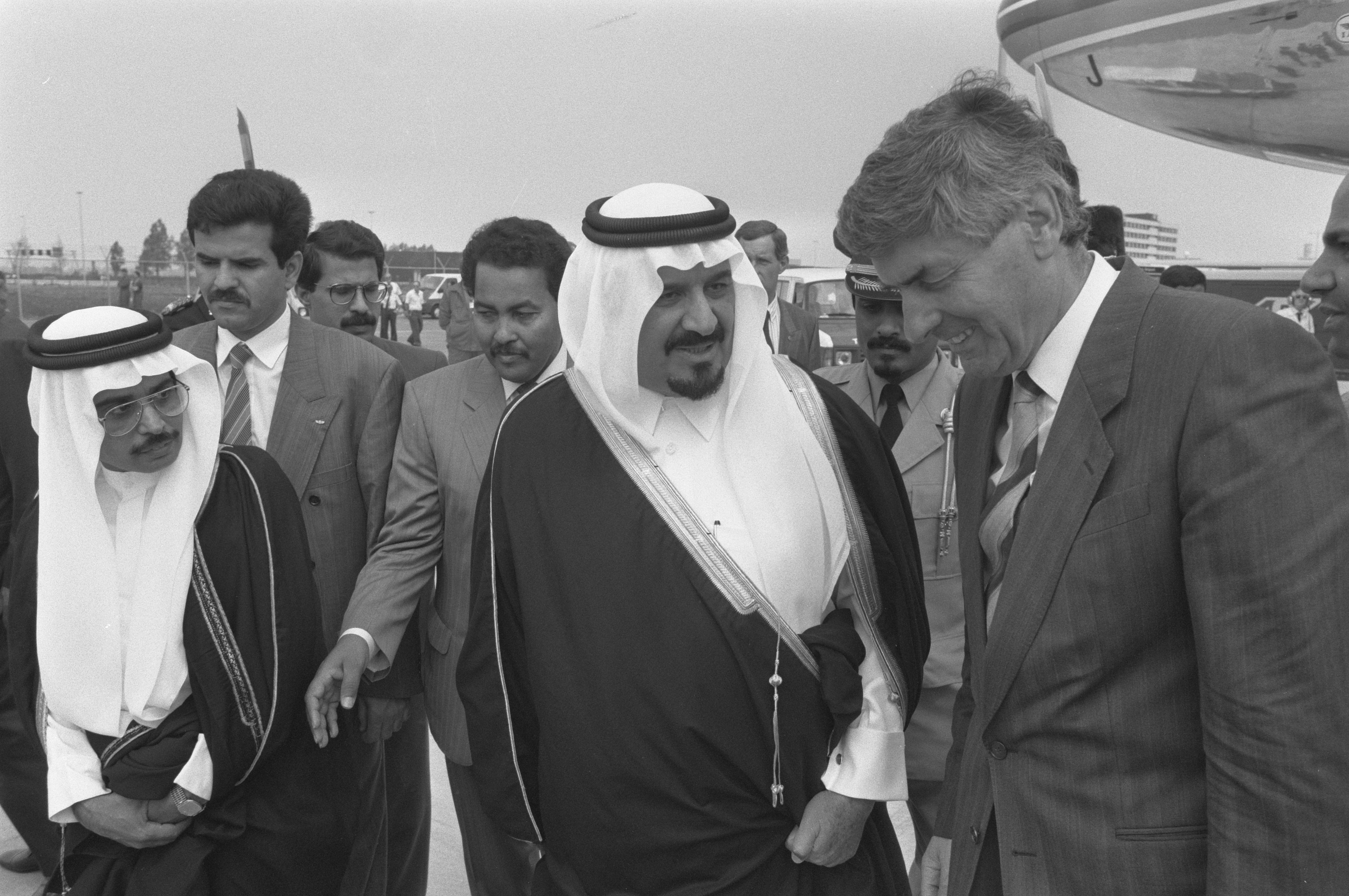
Sultan bin Abdulaziz Al Saud and Prime Minister of the Netherlands Ruud Lubbers at Airport Schiphol on 15 June 1989.

On 1 August 2005, Sultan bin Abdulaziz was designated heir apparent despite having a discord with King Abdullah. During the same period he led the group called Sudairi Seven, being the eldest of the group after King Fahd's demise.

== Various positions ==
During the 1970s Prince Sultan was one of the members of the inner family council which was led by King Khalid and included Sultan's brothers Prince Mohammed, Crown Prince Fahd, Prince Abdullah, and Prince Abdul Muhsin and his uncles Prince Ahmed and Prince Musaid.

Prince Sultan was Saudi Arabia's inspector general. He was chairman of the board of Saudi Arabia's national airline, Saudi Arabian Airlines. As chairman, he approved a ban on smoking inside all Saudi airports. In 1986, he founded the Saudi National Commission for Wildlife Conservation. He was chairman of the Higher Council for Islamic Affairs, which financially supports Muslim communities around the world.

=== Scientific prizes sponsored by Prince Sultan bin Abdulaziz ===
- Prince Sultan bin Abdulaziz prize for water. He was the founder and patron of the Prince Sultan bin Abdulaziz International Prize for Water, a bi-annual international scientific award for water research created in 2002.
- Prince Sultan bin Abdulaziz Chair for environmental engineering, department of civil engineering, King Fahd University for Petroleum and Minerals. It is the first chair in the university.
- The scientific agreement between Prince Sultan bin Abdulaziz and Oxford University for academic and cultural co-operation, which enables Saudi students for bachelor's, master and PhD degrees in the field of human sciences.

== Charity works ==
Prince Sultan played a role in many charitable works, including providing for the poor and people with special needs. He set up and funded the Sultan bin Abdulaziz Al Saud Foundation on 21 January 1995, with the aim of providing humanitarian services and medical services to people unable to afford the expenses. With the exception of his private residence and important necessities, he donated his possessions to the foundation.

The foundation includes the following centers in different countries:

- Sultan bin Abdulaziz Humanitarian City
  - Sultan bin Abdulaziz Science and Technology Center
  - Charity housing projects
  - Sultan bin Abdulaziz Special Education Program at the Arabian Gulf University in Bahrain
  - Prince Sultan Center for Speech and Hearing in Bahrain
  - King Abdulaziz Center for Islamic Studies at Bologna University
  - Sultan bin Abdulaziz Arab and Islamic Studies Program at the University of California, Berkeley
- Prince Sultan bin Abdulaziz Private: Committee for Relief.

This private committee organizes relief and medical convoys and sets up camps to combat diseases like Malaria and blindness. It has carried out several developmental, social and medical projects, like, digging wells, building schools, public libraries, mosques, hospitals, establishing dialysis centers. It also sponsors Muslim preachers in Ethiopia, Chad, Niger, Malawi, Mali, Comoro Islands, Djibouti and Indonesia.

He inaugurated and served as the patron of Prince Sultan University in Riyadh. It was named in his honor by the university's parent institution, Al-Riyadh Philanthropic Society, which was founded by the prince's brother, Salman of Saudi Arabia, who would later become king. This is the first private/non-profit university established in the kingdom. In 2007, Prince Sultan was awarded the Medal of Human Honor for his charitable works.

In April 2005, Sultan donated £2 million to the Ashmolean Museum. A year after his donations to establish an art museum, Oxford University agreed to 'expedite' the scholarship application process for Saudi students, and identify colleges for ten Saudi students from Prince Sultan University. When this arrangement became public, it led to criticism due to the donations bypassing Oxford's governing council, and breaching the admissions process for prospective students.

A press release issued by Oxford University on 20 April 2005 said that:

HRH Prince Sultan bin Abdulaziz Al Saud has given the Ashmolean Museum a substantial donation to provide a fitting home for the Museum's internationally renowned collection of Islamic art. The total value of the gift is £2 million, which will also provide for ten scholarships at the University of Oxford for Saudi Arabian students.

The press release added further that ‘the new gallery, part of the ambitious redevelopment of one of the world’s oldest museums, will be named the “Prince Sultan bin Abdulaziz al Saud Gallery”’. Arab News on 21 April 2005 reported that Sultan’s donation was a ‘move to promote understanding between Islam and the West’, adding that ‘Saudi and British officials’ had said that the new gallery ‘will help to portray Islamic culture and civilization in right perspectives.’

== Controversy ==
In 2002, families of the victims of the September 11 attacks in the United States sued Prince Sultan and other senior Saudi officials for their alleged contributions to al-Qaeda linked charities. The lawsuits were thrown out by a US federal judge due to insufficient evidence submitted.

== Personal life ==
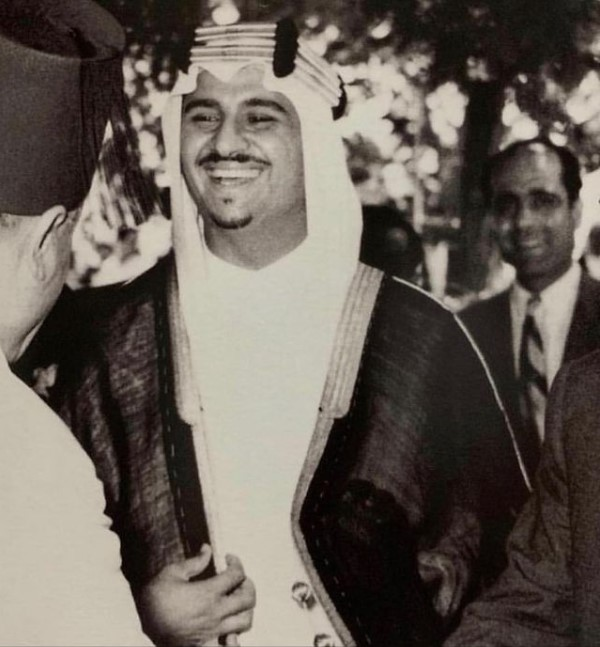
A young Prince Sultan meets foreign diplomats in the 1950s

Prince Sultan mostly married women who had a tribal background. He had thirty-two children by his multiple wives. His son Khalid bin Sultan, after Prince Sultan's death, was appointed deputy minister of defense and served in the post until 20 April 2013. Bandar bin Sultan was the former ambassador to the United States, the former secretary general of the national security council and the former head of the general intelligence directorate. Fahd bin Sultan is the governor of the Tabuk province. Salman bin Sultan, another son, is the former deputy defense minister. Faisal bin Sultan (born 1951) is the secretary general of Sultan bin Abdulaziz Al Saud Foundation.

His other sons are Turki (1959–2012), Nayef (born 1979), Badr (born 1980), Saud, Ahmad (born 1983), Nawwaf, Abdullah, Mishaal (born 1988), Mansour, Fawwaz, Abdulmajid and Abdul Ilah.

- Prince Khalid bin Sultan.
- Prince Bandar bin Sultan.
- Prince Fahd bin Sultan.
- Prince Turki bin Sultan (1959–2012).
- Prince Faisal bin Sultan. He is married to Princess Mudhawi bint Muhammad bin Abdullah Al Saud. He has two sons and two daughters named, Prince Mohammed (married to the daughter of His Royal Highness Prince Abdulaziz bin Abdullah bin Saud bin Abdulaziz Al Saud), Prince Khalid, Princess Nouf and Princess Sarah.
- Prince Salman bin Sultan.
- Prince Nayef bin Sultan (born 1979). He is married to Princess Jawaher bint Saud bin Nayef bin Abdulaziz Al Saud and has daughters: Princess Nouf, Princess Alia, and Princess Lulwa.
- Prince Badr bin Sultan (born 1980).
- Prince Saud bin Sultan. He is married to Princess Mishaal bint Nayef bin Abdulaziz Al Saud and has three children: Princess Lulwa, Prince Faisal, and Prince Nayef.
- Prince Nawaf bin Sultan. Married to Princess Al Hanouf bint Abdullah bin Abdulaziz Al Saud and has children: Prince Khalid, Prince Abdullah, Princess Al Anoud, Princess Sarah, and Princess Fahda.
- Prince Ahmed bin Sultan (nicknamed Sahm) is born in 1983. He is married to Princess Hassa bint Faisal bin Abdulaziz Al Saud, granddaughter of king Abdullah.
- Prince Mansour bin Sultan. He is married to Princess Maha bint Mishaal bin Abdulaziz Al Saud and has a daughter, Princess Lulwa.
- Prince Abdullah bin Sultan. He is married to Princess Reem bint Abdul Mohsen bin Abdul Malik Al Sheikh and has three children: Prince Sultan, Princess Basma, and Princess Noura.
- Prince Mishaal bin Sultan (born 1988). He is married to Princess Noura bint Fahd bin Turki II bin Abdulaziz Al Saud and has three children: Princess Moudi, Prince Sultan, and Princess Nouf.
- Prince Fawwaz bin Sultan. Married to Princess Abeer bint Khalid bin Faisal bin Turki Al Saud - granddaughter of Princess Lulwa bint Abdulaziz Al Saud - and has Princess Reema, Prince Abdulaziz, and Princess Lulwa.
- Prince Abdul-Ilah bin Sultan. He is married to Princess Noura bint Fahd bin Badr bin Abdulaziz Al Saud and has two children: Prince Sultan and Princess Arej.
- Prince Abdul Majeed bin Sultan

Prince Sultan had fifteen daughters, the oldest of whom is Nouf bint Sultan. One of his daughters, Reema, is the spouse of Muhammad bin Nayef, former Crown Prince. His other daughter, Noura bint Sultan, married Turki bin Nasser. Another daughter, Munira bint Sultan, who was Faisal bin Fahd's spouse, died in June 2011 at age 59.

- Princess Nouf bint Sultan
- Princess Jawaher bint Sultan. (Married to Prince Faisal bin Abdullah bin Mohammed bin Abdul Rahman Al Saud ).
- Princess Bandari bint Sultan. (Married to Prince Khalid bin Faisal bin Saad I bin Abdul Rahman Al Saud and has children: Prince Turki, Princess Ghada and Prince Nayef).
- Princess Lulwa bint Sultan. (Married to Prince Khalid bin Saad bin Fahd bin Saad I Abdul Rahman Al Saud ).
- Princess Latifa bint Sultan. (Married to Prince Faisal bin Mishaal bin Abdulaziz Al Saud ). And has children; Prince Turki, Prince Saud (married to Princess Adwaa bint Abdulaziz bin Mishaal bin Abdulaziz Al Saud ), Princess Al Anoud (married to Prince Abdulaziz bin Fahd bin Abdulaziz Al Saud), Princess Lulwa (married to Prince Abdul Majeed bin Abdul Ilah bin Abdulaziz Al Saud ), Princess Mudawi, and Princess Dalil.
- Princess Munira bint Sultan (deceased at the age of fifty-nine). (Was married to Prince Faisal bin Fahd bin Abdulaziz Al Saud ). And has children; Princess Haifa (married to Prince Saud bin Khalid bin Abdullah bin Abdul Rahman bin Faisal Al Saud), Shahinaz (married to Prince Bandar bin Khalid bin Abdullah bin Abdulaziz bin Abdullah Al Saud), Nasreen (married to Prince Faisal bin Ahmed bin Abdulaziz Al Saud), and Prince Nawaf (married to Moudi bint Ahmed bin Musaed bin Ahmed Al Sudairi).
- Princess Noura bint Sultan. (Married to Prince Turki bin Nasser bin Abdulaziz Al Saud). And has children; Princess Abeer (Divorced from Prince Abdulaziz bin Abdullah bin Abdulaziz Al Saud), Princess Arej (Married to Prince Turki bin Abdulaziz bin Thunayan Al Saud), Princess Lamia, Princess Reema (Married to Prince Fahd bin Faisal bin Abdulaziz Al Saud), Princess Haifa and Prince Abdullah.
- Princess Atab bint Sultan. (Married to Prince Faisal bin Saud bin Mohammed bin Abdulaziz bin Saud Al Saud ). And has children; Prince Mohammed (who was married to Princess Madawi bint Abdullah bin Abdulaziz Al Saud), Prince Bandar, Prince Fahd (who was married to Princess Madawi bint Muhammad bin Nawwaf bin Abdulaziz Al Saud ), and Princess Noura.
- Princess Reema bint Sultan. (Married to Prince Mohammed bin Nayef bin Abdulaziz Al Saud ). And has children; Princess sarah (was married to Prince Saud bin Fahd bin Abdullah bin Mohammed bin Saud Al Kabir), and Lulwa (Married to Prince Nayef bin Turki bin Abdullah bin Abdul Rahman Al Saud).
- Princess Sarah bint Sultan. (Married to Prince Fahd bin Mohammed bin Saud Al Kabir ). And has children; Prince Mohammed, Nayef, and Saud.
- Princess Daad bint Sultan. (Divorced from Prince Sattam bin Khalid bin Nasser bin Abdulaziz Al Saud ).
- Princess Abir bint Sultan. (Divorced from Prince Bandar bin Nasser bin Abdulaziz Al Saud ). And has one son, Prince Nasser.
- Princess Dima bint Sultan. (Married to Prince Fahd bin Saad bin Fahd bin Mohammed bin Abdulaziz Al Saud ).
- Princess Al Anoud bint Sultan. (Married to Prince Nawaf bin Nayef bin Abdulaziz Al Saud and they have two daughters: Princess Dima and Princess Nouf).
- Princess Mishaal bint Sultan. (Divorced from Prince Mohammed bin Saud bin Nayef bin Abdulaziz Al Saud, and married to Prince Abdulaziz bin Hussam bin Saud bin Abdulaziz Al Saud in April 2018. They have two children: Prince Saud, born in January 2019, and Princess Sarah, born in 2021).

=== Wives ===
- Khiziran, a concubine from Ethiopia, was the mother of his eldest son prince Bandar.
- Munira bint Abdulaziz bin Musaed bin Jalawi (deceased), mother of Prince Fahd, Prince Turki, Prince Faisal, Princess Nouf, Princess Jawaher, Princess Bandari, Princess Lulwa, and Princess Latifa.
- Huda bint Abdullah Al Sheikh, mother of Prince Nayef, Prince Badr, Prince Saud, Prince Nawaf, Prince Mansour, Princess Al-Anoud, and Prince Abdullah.
- Sita bint Juwaid Al-Damir Al-Ajami (divorced), mother of prince Salman.
- Al-Bandari bint Sunt bin Banin Al-Dhiabi Al-Otaibi (divorced), mother of Prince Ahmed.
- Mounira bint Mishaal bin Saud Al Rashid (deceased), mother of his two daughters Princess Noura and Princess Munira.
- Mouda bint Salman Al Mandeel Al Khaldi (divorced), mother of Prince Mishaal and Princess Mishael.
- Leila Al Thunayan (divorced), mother of Princess Atab, Princess Rima, and Princess Sarah.
- Areej bint Salem Al Maree, mother of his youngest two sons, Prince Abdulmajid and Abdul Ilah.
- Hussa bint Muhammed bin Abdulaziz bin Turki (divorced), mother of Princess Daad.
- Jowaher bint Mohammed bin Saud bin Nasser Al Farhan Al Saud (divorced), mother of Princess Dima.
- Nawal Al-Kahimi (divorced), mother of Princess Abeer.
- Abir bint Fahd Al Farhan Al Saud (divorced), mother of Fawwaz.
- Tarfah bint Abdullah bin Abdulrahman Aldakhil
- Mouda bint Saud Al Kabeer Al Saud (divorced)
- Dina bint Abdulhamid Alsahhaf (divorced)
- Maha bint Abdullah Albanyan (divorced)
- Ghadir bint Shawaan Al Shibani (divorced)
- Mashail bint Mamdouh Al Ali

== Characteristics ==
Prince Sultan was regarded by the House of Saud as a workaholic. He doled out money at banquets in keeping with tribal customs. A conservative, it was expected that he would have put a brake on King Abdullah's timid reforms. Sultan was considered to be pro-American.

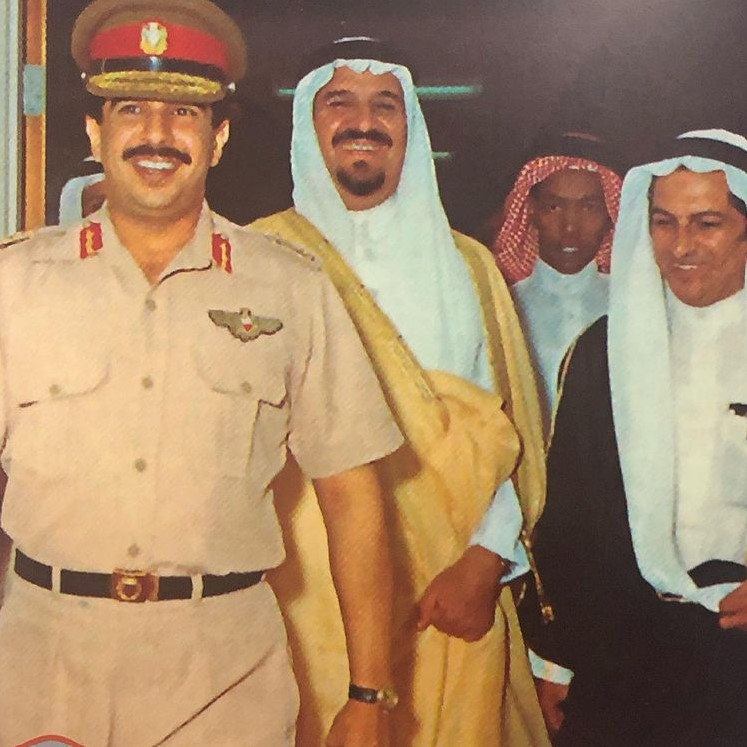
Sultan bin Abdulaziz and Hamad bin Isa Al Khalifa in the 1980s.

== Views ==
Sultan took a lifetime anti-communist and anti-Soviet view, based on his dislike of Soviet state atheism as well as Soviet interest in Gulf oil and access to ports that he felt risked Saudi independence. He rebuked U.S. President Jimmy Carter for what he saw as "pusillanimity" in the face of the Soviet invasion of Afghanistan.

In a 23 October 2001 interview in Kuwaiti newspaper As Seyassa, concerning 9/11 attacks, Sultan stated “Who stands behind this terrorism and who carried out this complicated and carefully planned terrorist operation? Osama bin Laden and those with him have said what indicates that they stand behind this carefully planned act. We, in turn, ask: Are bin Laden and his supporters the only ones behind what happened or is there another power with advanced technical expertise that acted with them?”.

== Wealth and property ==
Prince Sultan's wealth in 1990 was reported to be $1.2 billion. In 1993 Fortune magazine cited him as the 34th rich person in the world with $4.0 billion wealth. Later, his fortune was estimated at $270 billion, which he distributed between his sons prior to his death in October 2011 in order to support their political position in the competitive princely arena. Prince Sultan owned 2–8a Rutland Gate, the former London residence of the Lebanese politician and businessman Rafic Hariri. Prince Sultan had been given the property after Hariri's assassination in 2005.

Documents in the Paradise Papers release show Prince Sultan used the law firm Appleby at the center of the use of offshore businesses and trusts by world leaders.

== Health issues ==
Prince Sultan was rumored to have had colon cancer in 2003. A foreign correspondent was forced to leave the country after reporting his health problems.

In 2004, Prince Sultan was diagnosed with colon cancer and underwent several corrective surgeries. He underwent an operation to remove an intestinal polyp in Jeddah in 2005. Prince Sultan visited a Swiss clinic in late April 2008. In April 2009, he began to suffer from Alzheimer's disease.

He was reported to be suffering dementia, specifically Alzheimer's disease.

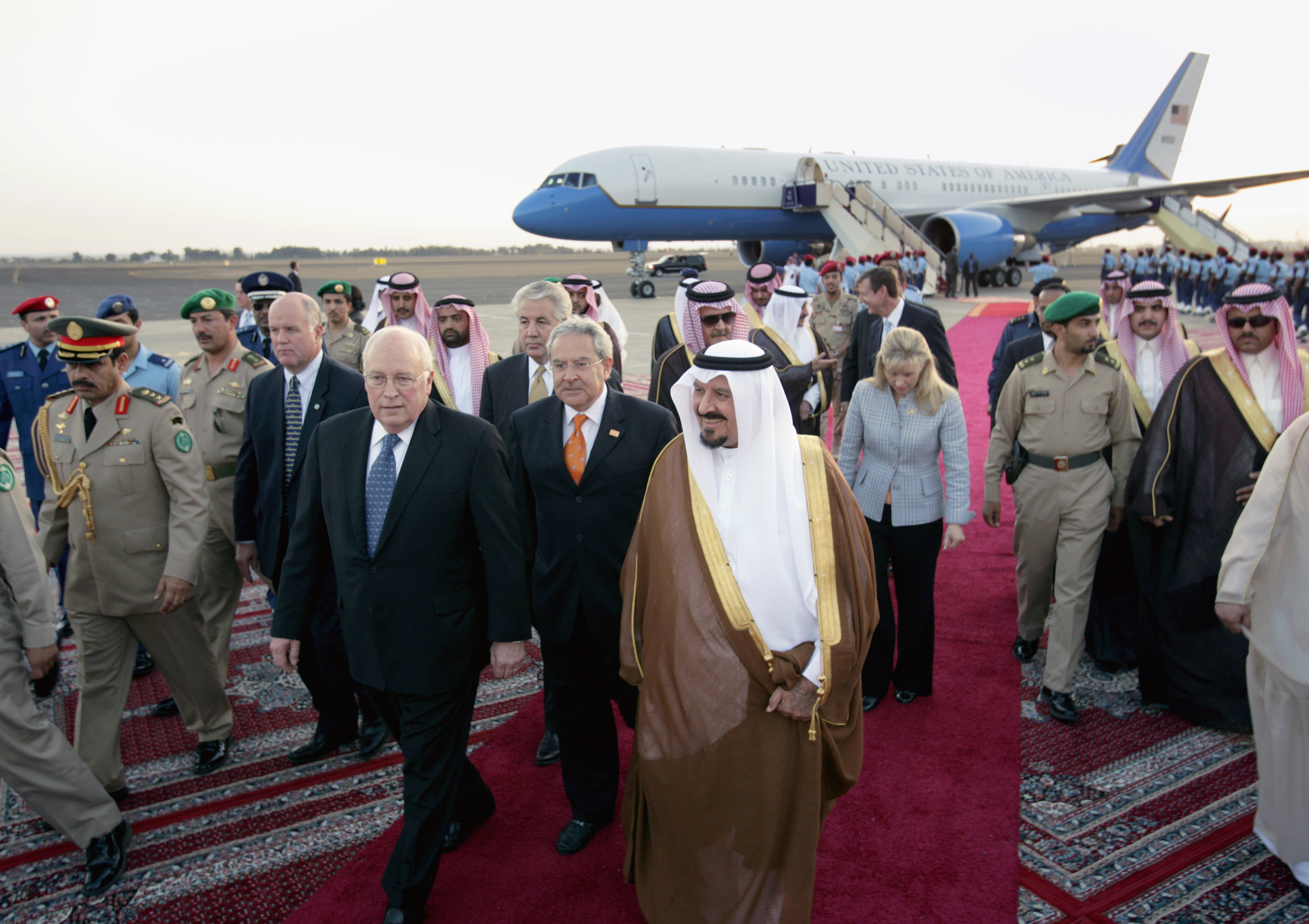
Prince Sultan meets the U.S. Vice President Dick Cheney in 2007

=== Morocco vacation ===
In February 2009, Sultan spent several months in New York City at New York–Presbyterian Hospital and underwent surgery in New York. He then convalesced at Agadir, Morocco. He went back to Saudi Arabia, but soon returned to Morocco in August 2009. During his vacation, the Saudi cabinet increased officer salaries, a traditional domain of Sultan.

In 2009, King Abdullah took charge of all defense purchases and reduced the power of the Defense Ministry. In October 2010, Abdullah personally conducted much of the negotiations for the U.S. arms package worth over $60 billion.

In November 2010, Sultan received in Agadir Lebanese Prime Minister Saad Al-Hariri to discuss the future of Lebanon's government. He had been receiving treatment since 2009 for what analysts and diplomats believed to be cancer. At the end of November 2010, he returned to Saudi Arabia because King Abdullah had left for the United States for surgery. His return was seen as a legal formality necessary under Saudi law, which stipulates that only one of the kingdom's top two officials can be abroad at a given time.

== Death and funeral ==
The Saudi Royal court announced on 22 October 2011 that Prince Sultan died at dawn of an unspecified illness. According to media reports, Prince Sultan had been battling cancer and had been seeking medical treatment in the United States since mid-June 2011. He had a surgical operation in New York in July 2011. Unnamed U.S. officials cited by The New York Times stated that he died at New York-Presbyterian Hospital in Manhattan, New York City.

His body was taken from New York City to Riyadh on 24 October 2011. His funeral was held at the Imam Turki bin Abdullah mosque in Riyadh on 25 October 2011 in the presence of King Abdullah bin Abdulaziz. He was buried in Al Oud cemetery in Riyadh.

Various leaders, including the president of Afghanistan, Farouk Al Sharaa, the vice-president of Syria, the Iranian foreign minister and the head of Egypt's ruling military council, participated in the funeral. Additionally, other statesmen went to Riyadh to offer their condolences, such as the US Vice President Joe Biden, Pakistani President Asif Ali Zardari and Malaysian Prime Minister Najib Razak.

== Honours ==
Among others, Prince Sultan was the recipient of the following honours and medals:

- Order of St Michael and St George (May 1967)
- National Order of Chad, First Class (1972)
- Order of the Lion of Senegal (1972)
- Order of Merit of the Italian Republic, First Class (19 July 1997)
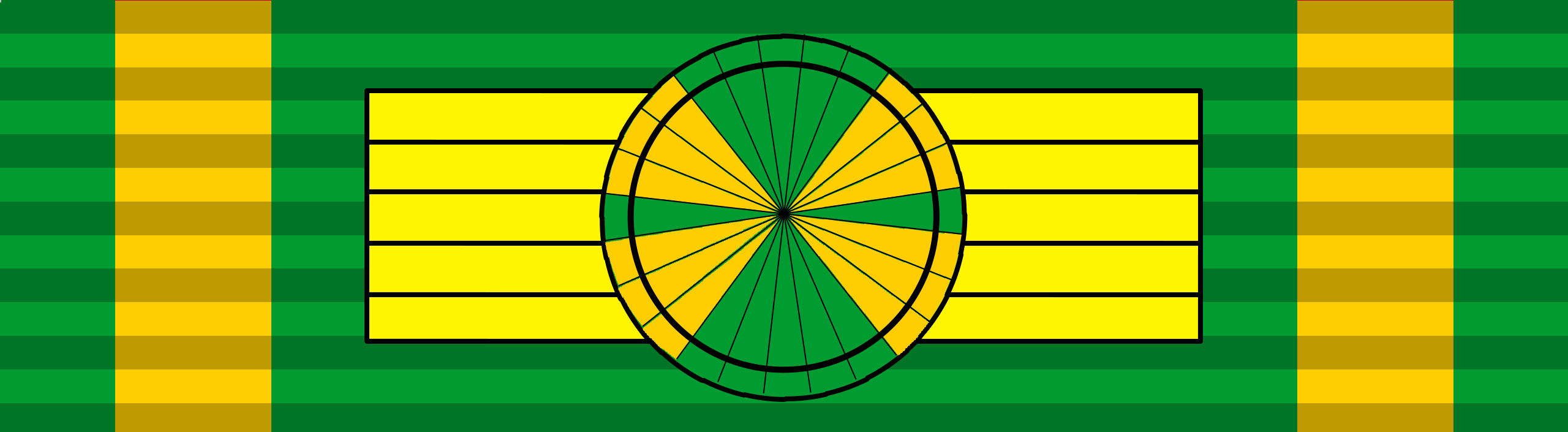
- Order of King Abdulaziz (1973; First Class).
- National Order of Merit (1973; Grand Class)
- Order of the Liberator, First Class (Venezuela, 1975)
- Honorary Commander of the Order of the Defender of the Realm (P.M.N.) (Malaysia; 1982)
- Honorary Grand Commander of the Order of the Defender of the Realm (Malaysia; 2000)

He was also posthumously given the King Khalid award in 2011.

Saudi Arabian royalty
Preceded by Abdullah bin Abdulaziz	Crown Prince of Saudi Arabia; 1 August 2005 – 22 October 2011	Succeeded by Nayef bin Abdulaziz
Political offices
Preceded by Nasser bin Abdulaziz Al Saud	Governor of Riyadh; 1947–1952	Succeeded by Nayef bin Abdulaziz Al Saud
Preceded by Abdullah bin Abdulaziz Al Saud	Second Deputy Prime Minister of Saudi Arabia; 1982 – 27 March 2009	Succeeded by Nayef bin Abdulaziz Al Saud
Preceded by Abdullah bin Abdulaziz Al Saud	First Deputy Prime Minister of Saudi Arabia; 1 August 2005 – 22 October 2011	Succeeded by Nayef bin Abdulaziz Al Saud
