= Sultan bin Abdulaziz Al Saud Foundation =

Saudi Arabian charitable organization

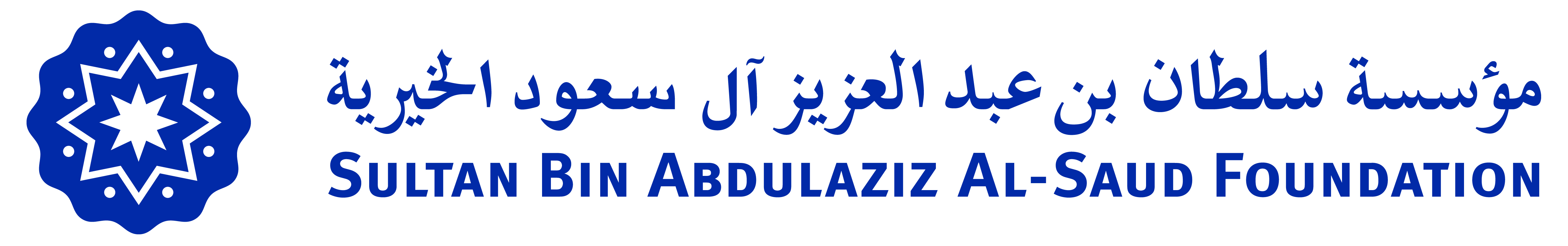
- Formation: 1995
- Founder: Sultan bin Abdulaziz Al Saud
- Type: Non-profit sadaqa (charity)
- Purpose: Healthcare, education, research, humanitarian aid
- Headquarters: Riyadh, Saudi Arabia
- Region served: Worldwide
- Key people: Khalid bin Sultan (Chairman); Fahd bin Sultan (Deputy Chairman); Faisal bin Sultan (Secretary General)
- Website: sbaf.org.sa

Sultan bin Abdulaziz Al Saud Foundation is a non-profit charity organization in Saudi Arabia set up and funded by former Crown Prince Sultan in 1995. The foundation participates in projects ranging from large housing projects for the needy and the provision of medical care facilities in Saudi Arabia to the funding of scientific research.

== Objectives ==
The foundation has several humanitarian and social objectives:

- Provision of social and healthcare as well as rehabilitation and nursing centers to provide specialized advanced medical services
- Aiding in the development of the health care system in the Kingdom of Saudi Arabia
- Providing comprehensive care for the disabled and the elderly
- Following up with scientific and technological advances, with special attention to the fields related to medicine and health.
- Conducting research in the fields of medical humanitarian works in cooperation with the international research centers.
- The enhancement of social development through the provision of charitable housing programs and the development of charitable institutions
- Supporting government efforts in cultural communication with the wider global community, seeking to address and correct negative stereotypical perceptions of the Kingdom and the Arabic and Islamic world.
- Humanitarian projects throughout the Arab and Islamic world and friendly states.

== Projects and activities ==
The foundation achieves its goals through the following projects and activities:

- Sultan bin Abdulaziz Humanitarian City: It was opened by then Crown Prince Abdullah in Riyadh on 30 October 2002. It was financed by Prince Sultan’s charitable foundation at a cost of 1.2 billion riyals ($320 million). It is the biggest rehabilitation complex of its kind worldwide. It contains a complete center for medical check-ups, laboratories and radiation therapy sections, in addition to ten major operation rooms, eight minor operation rooms, and a medical rehabilitation center with a capacity of 250 beds. It also has rehabilitation center for the elderly with a capacity of 150 beds. It also contains a center for children development that can accommodate up to 150 children at the same time. This city is designed to receive newborn babies and children up to six years old. Its main goal is to carry out early intervention treatment to assist children who have minor disabilities to enable them to join public schools normally and independently. It does so by providing teaching and treatment programs to those who have physical disability, growth abnormalities, and health complexes that require special education.
- The program offers medical and educational communication: Services via satellite, and fiber' optics networks. In addition, it spreads health education inside and outside the kingdom.
- Sultan bin Abdulaziz Science and Technology Center: This center aims at spreading knowledge and supporting scientific and technological inventions, especially among children, donated by Prince Sultan to King Fahd University for Petrol & Minerals in Dhahran 2005.
- Prince Sultan bin Abdulaziz AI Saud Foundation's charity housing projects; It enables the families in need to possess houses. Several projects in the Southern Region, Tabuk Region and Hail Region have been developed. Each project consists of 100 fully furnished villas, all provided with the necessary utilities. The projects include mosques, schools, social centers and clinics.
- Sultan bin Abdulaziz Special Education Program, at the Arabian Gulf University in Bahrain: The program's objective is to qualify specialists in the field of special education.
- Prince Sultan Center for Speech and Hearing in Bahrain: This center is a positive outcome of cooperation between Sultan Bin Abdulaziz Al Saud Foundation and the Bahraini Society for Child Development. It aims at qualifying the persons with hearing disabilities.
- King Abdulaziz Center for Islamic Studies at Bologna University in Italy: The center is specialized in Islamic studies, including Islamic Shari'ah (law), history, philosophy, Arabic, and Oriental languages.
- Sultan bin Abdulaziz Arab and Islamic Studies Program at the University of California, Berkeley: The program teaches Arabic language and Islamic Shari'ah (law). It provides support to researchers, visitors, graduates and post-graduates students, who have interest in studying subjects related to Arabic and Islamic world, in the area of language, history, sociology, and humanities, etc. It also aims at introducing the noble Islamic principles to foster bridges between the East and the West.

== Council of Trustees ==
The Chairman of the Council of Trustees is Khalid bin Sultan and the General Secretary of the Foundation is Faisal bin Sultan. Fahd bin Sultan is the Deputy Chairman and Salman bin Sultan is the Deputy General Secretary of the Foundation. The members of the board are the late Crown Prince Sultan's sons: Bandar bin Sultan, Nayef bin Sultan, Badr bin Sultan, Saud bin Sultan, Ahmed bin Sultan, Mansour bin Sultan, Abdallah bin Sultan, Mishaal bin Sultan, Fawwaz bin Sultan, Abdul Ilah bin Sultan and Abdul Majeed bin Sultan.
