= Khalid bin Bandar Al Saud (born 1951) =

Saudi royal and former government official

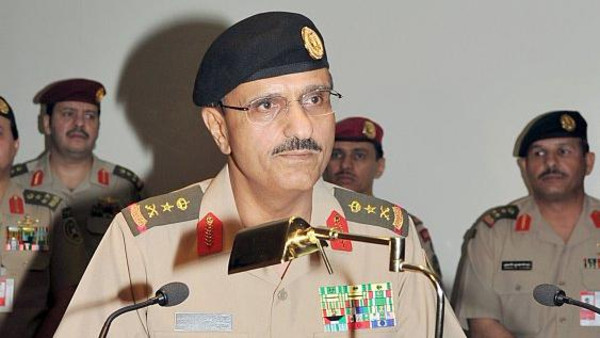

President of General Intelligence
- In office: 30 June 2014 – 29 January 2015
- Predecessor: Youssef bin Ali Al Idrissi
- Successor: Khalid bin Ali Al Humaidan
- Monarch: King Abdullah; King Salman

Deputy Defense Minister
- In office: 14 May 2014 – 28 June 2014
- Predecessor: Salman bin Sultan
- Successor: Khalid bin Salman bin Abdulaziz Al Saud
- Monarch: King Abdullah

Governor of Riyadh Province
- In office: 14 February 2013 – 14 May 2014
- Predecessor: Sattam bin Abdulaziz
- Successor: Turki bin Abdullah Al Saud
- Monarch: King Abdullah
- Born: 1951 (age 74–75)
Names
- Khalid bin Bandar bin Abdulaziz bin Abdul Rahman Al Saud
- House: Al Saud
- Father: Bandar bin Abdulaziz
- Mother: Wasmya bint Mohammed bin Moammer
- Education: Royal Military Academy Sandhurst

Khalid bin Bandar Al Saud (Arabic: خالد بن بندر بن عبد العزيز آل سعود; born 1951) is a Saudi Arabian soldier and member of the House of Saud, who served as president of General Intelligence, deputy defense minister and governor of the Riyadh Province. Prince Khalid is the grandson of Saudi's founder Ibn Saud and was the first of his grandsons to serve as the governor of the Riyadh Province.

== Early life and education ==
Prince Khalid was born in 1951. He is the third son of Prince Bandar. One of his brothers is Prince Turki.

Prince Khalid graduated from Royal Military Academy Sandhurst in 1973. He also earned a master's degree in military sciences. He participated in advanced foundational courses for armor officers in Saudi Arabia and United States, and also been involved in several different field exercises.

== Career ==
Khalid bin Bandar is a high-ranking commander of the Saudi Arabian Army. He began his military service in the first battalion of the fourth armored brigade. He also worked as an operations officer in the armored forces command, and was later promoted to deputy commander. In the 1980s Khalid served with the G3 armored corps in the Royal Saudi Land Forces (SALF). He was promoted to major general in 1997, and was appointed deputy commander of the SALF. In May 2011, Khalid was promoted to the rank of lieutenant general, and appointed commander of the SALF. He served in this post until his appointment as Riyadh governor, and was replaced by Eid bin Awadh Al Shalawi. In his role as commander of SALF, he made several visits to foreign nations. He also participated in foreign joint cooperation committees between Saudi Arabia and other countries, including the United States and Russia.

In 1991, Khalid served in SALF during the liberation of Kuwait, and in 2009, Khalid was assigned to participate in South Shield operations against Houthis.

On 14 February 2013, Prince Khalid was appointed governor of the Riyadh province, succeeding Prince Sattam. His deputy was Prince Turki bin Abdullah, who was appointed on the same day.

On 14 May 2014, Prince Khalid was appointed deputy defense minister succeeding Salman bin Sultan and Turki bin Abdullah was made the governor of Riyadh.

On 30 June 2014 Prince Khalid was appointed president of the General Intelligence. His term ended on 29 January 2015 when he was succeeded by Khalid bin Ali Al Humaidan in the post. Prince Khalid serves as an advisor to King Salman.

== Honors and awards ==
Khalid was awarded the Order of Abdulaziz Al Saud High Class, in 2011. He was also decorated by Pakistani President Asif Zardari with the military crescent medal, which is a medal awarded by Pakistan to distinctive foreign military personalities. He has also received medals from both Kuwait and Saudi Arabia for his participation in the Gulf War.
