= Harb (surname) =

Harb (Arabic: حرب, lit. 'War') is an Arabic surname and given name that may refer to the following people:

- Harb ibn Umayya (died 6th/7th century), primary commander of the Quraysh in the Fijar Wars and first Qurashi to stop consuming wine
- Abu Sufyan ibn Harb (560–650), son of the 6th century Arabian Meccan leader Harb ibn Umayya, and leader of the Quraysh of Mecca
- Ahmad Harb (1951–2025), Palestinian novelist
- Ahmad ibn Harb (died 234), Iranian Sufi, traditionist and a fighter in the holy wars
- Benjamín Miguel Harb (1926–2008), Bolivian politician and lawyer
- Boutros Harb (born 1944), Lebanese politician
- Chucrallah Harb (1923–2019), Lebanese Hierarch of Maronite Church
- Fred Harb (1930–2016), American stock car racing driver
- Harith ibn Harb, son of the 6th century Arabian Meccan leader Harb ibn Umayya, brother of Abu Sufyan ibn Harb
- Hazem Harb (born 1980) Palestinian visual artist
- Helen Hicks Harb (1911–1974), American golfer
- Janan Harb (born 1947), wife of King Fahd of Saudi Arabia
- Joseph Harb (1940–2014), Lebanese poet and writer
- Mac Harb (born 1953), Canadian parliamentarian
- Mehdi Harb (born 1979), Tunisian football player
- Nabil Abou-Harb (born 1984), Arab-American filmmaker, writer, producer, and director
- Ragheb Harb (1952–1984), Lebanese resistance leader and Muslim cleric
- Ramez Harb (died 2012), Palestinian militant
- Talaat Harb (1867–1941), Egyptian economist
- Tanios Harb (born 1925), Lebanese sports shooter
- Wahshi ibn Harb, companion of the Islamic prophet Muhammad
- Zaid Al-Harb (1887–1972), Kuwaiti poet
