= Saudi Arabian Football Federation =

National football-governing body

AFC
- Short name: SAFF
- Founded: 1955; 71 years ago
- Headquarters: Riyadh, Saudi Arabia
- FIFA affiliation: 1956; 70 years ago
- AFC affiliation: 1972; 54 years ago.
- WAFF affiliation: 2010; 16 years ago
- President: Bader Al-Reziza
- Website: saff.com.sa

The Saudi Arabian Football Federation (SAFF; Arabic: الإتحاد السعودي لكرة القدم) is the football governing body of Saudi Arabia. Founded in 1955, Its responsibilities include administration of club competitions and national teams. The founder of the federation is Prince Abdullah bin Faisal.

== History ==
The SAFF was formally established in 1955 and it joined the FIFA in the next year and the Asian Football Confederation in 1974, to begin the process of organizing his local championships in addition to his external contributions during which he achieved many great achievements.

The SAFF organizes local football competitions, in addition to organizing the participation of Saudi national teams and clubs internationally, as it effectively supervises 153 clubs participating in football competitions. Premier, First, Second, and Third) – The Custodian of the Two Holy Mosques Champions – U-23 Championship (for the First and First Class) – Youth League Championship (Premier and First Class Clubs) – and the Junior League for Premier and Clubs First Class.

The SAFF is considered one of the most famous federations in the Asian continent in the field of football. On the regional level, the Saudi national team has won the Gulf Cup title 3 times in its history. Continental, the first Saudi national football team has not been absent from the final of the Asian Cup since 1984 until In 2004, when its absence from the final of the championship that was held in China, which the Japanese team won, was the first since 1984.

During the Saudi national team's qualifying in the Asian Cup final five times in a row, they won the title three times, its beginning in 1984 and then in 1988 and 1996 after it had lost the 1992 and 2000 finals to the Japanese team with the same result 1–0.

At the international level, the Saudi team qualified to the World Cup Finals four times in a row since its debut in 1994, where they ended up in round 16 after they were defeated by Sweden 3–1, as their best result in its history, until the 2006 World Cup in Germany. before they qualified again to the 2018 World Cup in Russia. And the Saudi Arabia U-16 team achieved the 1989 FIFA U-16 World Championship held in Scotland in 1989 after defeating in the final match against the host nation, becoming the first Asian team to win a FIFA tournament.

As of August 2021, they remain the only Asian men's team to win any FIFA tournament. Clubs also a number of continental championships at the level of football competitions in the Asian continent, also the first Asian team to participate in Club World Cup was the Saudi Al-Nassr in 2000, followed by Al-Ittihad in 2005.

SAFF appointed Croatian Romeo Jozak as technical director on 22 July 2021.

== List of presidents of SAFF ==
The following is a list of presidents of The Saudi Arabian Football Federation (SAFF) since its establishment in 1956.

- 1956–1971: Khalid Al-Faisal
- 1971–1999: Faisal bin Fahd
- 1999–2011: Sultan bin Fahd
- 2011–2014: Nawaf bin Faisal
- 2014–2016: Ahmad Eid Al-Harbi
- 2016–2018: Adel Ezzat
- 2018–2019: Kosay Abdulaziz Al-Fawaz
- 2019–2026: Yasser Al-Misehal
- 2026–2030: Bader Al Ruzaiza

=== Association staff (Current) ===
Name	Position	Source
(Saudi Arabia) Yasser Al-Misehal	President	
(Saudi Arabia) Lamia Bin Bahian	Vice President	
(Saudi Arabia) Ibrahim Al-Kassim	General Secretary	
(Morocco) Nasser Larguet	Men's Technical Director	
(Greece) Georgios Donis	Team Coach (Men's)	
(Germany) Monika Staab	Women's Technical Director	
(Switzerland) Manuel Navarro	Referee Committee Director	
(Spain) Lluís Cortés	Team Coach (Women's)	

== Domestic competitions ==
Leagues – Men

- Saudi Pro League
- Saudi First Division League
- Saudi Second Division League
- Saudi League Third Division League
- Saudi Fourth Division League
- Saudi Reserve League (defunct)

Leagues – Youth

- Saudi Elite League U–21
- Saudi Premier League U–19
- Saudi First Division League U–19
- Saudi Premier Division League U–17
- Saudi First Division League U–17
- Saudi Premier Division League U–15
- Saudi First Division League U–15
- Sauei Premier Division League U–13
- Saudi First Division League U–13

Leagues – Women

- Saudi Women's Premier League
- Saudi Women's First Division League
- Saudi Women's Second Division League
- SAFF Women's National Football Championship (defunct)
- Women's Community Football League (defunct)
- Saudi Women's U–17 Tournament

Cups – Men

- King's Cup
- Saudi Super Cup
- Crown Prince's Cup (defunct)
- Saudi Federation Cup (defunct)
- Saudi Founder's Cup (held every 100 years)

Cups – Women

- SAFF Women's Cup
- Saudi Women's Super Cup

Other - Men

- Saudi Beach Soccer Premier League
- Saudi Futsal Premier League
- Saudi Futsal First Division League
- SAFF Futsal Cup
- Saudi Futsal Super Cup

Other - Women

- Saudi Women's Futsal Tournament

== National teams ==
Men's

- Senior National Football Team
- National Football Team U-23
- National Football Team U-20
- National Football Team U-21
- National Football Team U-19
- National Football Team U-17

Women's

- Senior National Football Team
- National Football Team U-20
- National Football Team U-17

== Controversies ==
During 2018 FIFA World Cup qualification, the fixtures between Saudi Arabia and Palestine were switched after Saudi Arabia cited “exceptional conditions” for their inability to travel to the West Bank. The return fixture, originally to be played on 13 October 2015 at the Faisal Al-Husseini International Stadium, Al-Ram, was later postponed due to Saudi Arabia's refusal to pass through Israeli-controlled borders, until the process of agreeing on the venue was concluded. The match was rescheduled to be played on 5 November 2015 in Palestine, after the Palestinian Football Association gave full security guarantees for the match. The match was later further delayed until 9 November, and to be changed to a neutral venue in Asia, as the Palestinian government confirmed that it could no longer guarantee the safety and security for the match. The neutral venue was announced to be Amman International Stadium in Amman, Jordan.

In 2016, the SAFF refused to travel to Iran during the 2016 AFC Champions League.

On 8 June 2017, the Saudi Arabia national team failed to observe a moment of silence before a World Cup qualifying match against Australia in honor of the 2017 London Bridge attack victims.

In November 2017, Saudi Arabia, United Arab Emirates, and Bahrain pulled out of the 23rd Arabian Gulf Cup due to the 2017 Qatar diplomatic crisis. However, they eventually participated in the competition after the host country was moved to Kuwait.

== See also ==
- Football in Saudi Arabia
- List of football clubs in Saudi Arabia
- List of football stadiums in Saudi Arabia
