= Turki bin Mohammed Al Saud (born 1979) =

Saudi royal and government official

Turki bin Muhammad Al Saud
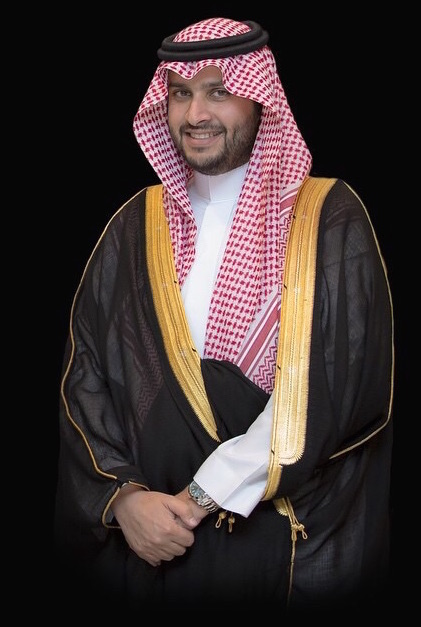
- Turki in 2015

Minister of State and member of the Council of Ministers of Saudi Arabia
- Reign: 27 September 2022 – present
- Born: 5 October 1979 (age 47); Riyadh, Saudi Arabia
- Spouse: Princess Al Jawhara bint Mohammed Al Saud
- Issue: Prince Fahd; Prince Muhammad; Princess Nouf; Princess Luluwah; Princess Nora
Names
- Turki bin Muhammad bin Fahd bin Abdulaziz Al Saud Arabic: تركي بن محمد بن فهد بن عبد العزيز آل سعود
- House: Saud
- Father: Prince Mohammed bin Fahd bin Abdulaziz
- Mother: Princess Jawahir bint Nayef bin Abdulaziz
- Religion: Sunni Islam
- Occupation: Minister of State and Member of The Council of Ministers of Saudi Arabia

Turki bin Muhammad Al Saud (Arabic: تركي بن محمد آل سعود; born 5 October 1979) is a Saudi Minister of State, a member of the Council of Ministers of Saudi Arabia, and of the House of Saud. He is the eldest son of Prince Mohammad Bin Fahd Bin Abdulaziz.

== Early life and education ==
Prince Turki was born on 5 October 1979 in Riyadh. His father, Prince Mohammed bin Fahd, is the former governor of the Eastern Province. He is the grandson of King Fahd who was the older brother of King Salman bin Abdulaziz. Prince Turki was raised by his grandfathers, King Fahd and Prince Nayef bin Abdulaziz.

Prince Turki received his primary, intermediate, and secondary education at the Dhahran School, an international K-9 institution owned and operated by the Saudi Aramco School District. In 1998, he enrolled at King Faisal University, and graduated with a bachelor's degree in Law in 2002. In 2013, he obtained a license to practice law in Saudi Arabia issued by the Ministry of Justice.

== Career ==
Prince Turki was appointed an adviser to the Royal Court with the rank of minister on 21 June 2017. On 27 December 2018, he was appointed Minister of State and a member of the Council of Ministers, positions he has continued to hold.

In June 2018, he was appointed a member of the Council of Royal Reserves and chair of the boards of the Imam Abdulaziz bin Mohammed Royal Reserve and the Imam Turki bin Abdullah Royal Reserve. The King Khalid Royal Reserve, established in October 2019, is also chaired by him. He also served as a member of the board of the King Abdulaziz Foundation for Research and Archives (Darah) and as chair of its executive committee.

Prince Turki supervised Al-Fahd: Spirit of Leadership, an exhibition about King Fahd that was first held in Riyadh in 2015 and later staged in Kuwait in 2019. In the private sector, he was appointed chair of Eastern Province Cement in February 2015.

== Community service ==
Prince Turki is involved in his community in various ways: he is the vice-chairman of the Board of Trustees of Prince Mohammad bin Fahd University. Prince Turki chairs the executive committee of the Prince Mohammed bin Fahd Foundation for Humanitarian Development.

The Prince is the president of the Founding Committee of the Prince Sultan bin Abdulaziz College for the Visually Impaired, an initiative that fosters learning opportunities for people with this kind of disability. He is also the founder and chair of the board of the Benaa Association for Orphan Care in the Eastern Province, an organization that provides opportunities for orphans . He is also a member of the Board of Directors of King Fahd Charitable Foundation, Chairman of the Board of Directors of Ta'aleem Charitable Foundation, and a member of the Board of Trustees of Princess Alanoud Bint Abdulaziz Charitable Foundation.

== Businesses ==
Prince Turki is chairman of the TAALEM Educational Services Company. He also serves as Vice Chairman of the Saudi Arabian Amiantit Company, which was founded in 1968 and is headquartered in Dammam. Together with its subsidiaries, the company has developed into a major diversified industrial group and manufactures and sells pipes and related products worldwide. The Group comprises 30 pipe system manufacturing plants, 6 technology companies, 4 materials suppliers, and 8 supply and engineering subsidiaries in a number of countries around the world. In addition, an extensive sales and service network caters to the needs of customers in more than 70 countries.
