= Nawaf bin Faisal Al Saud =

Saudi Arabian royal (born 1978)

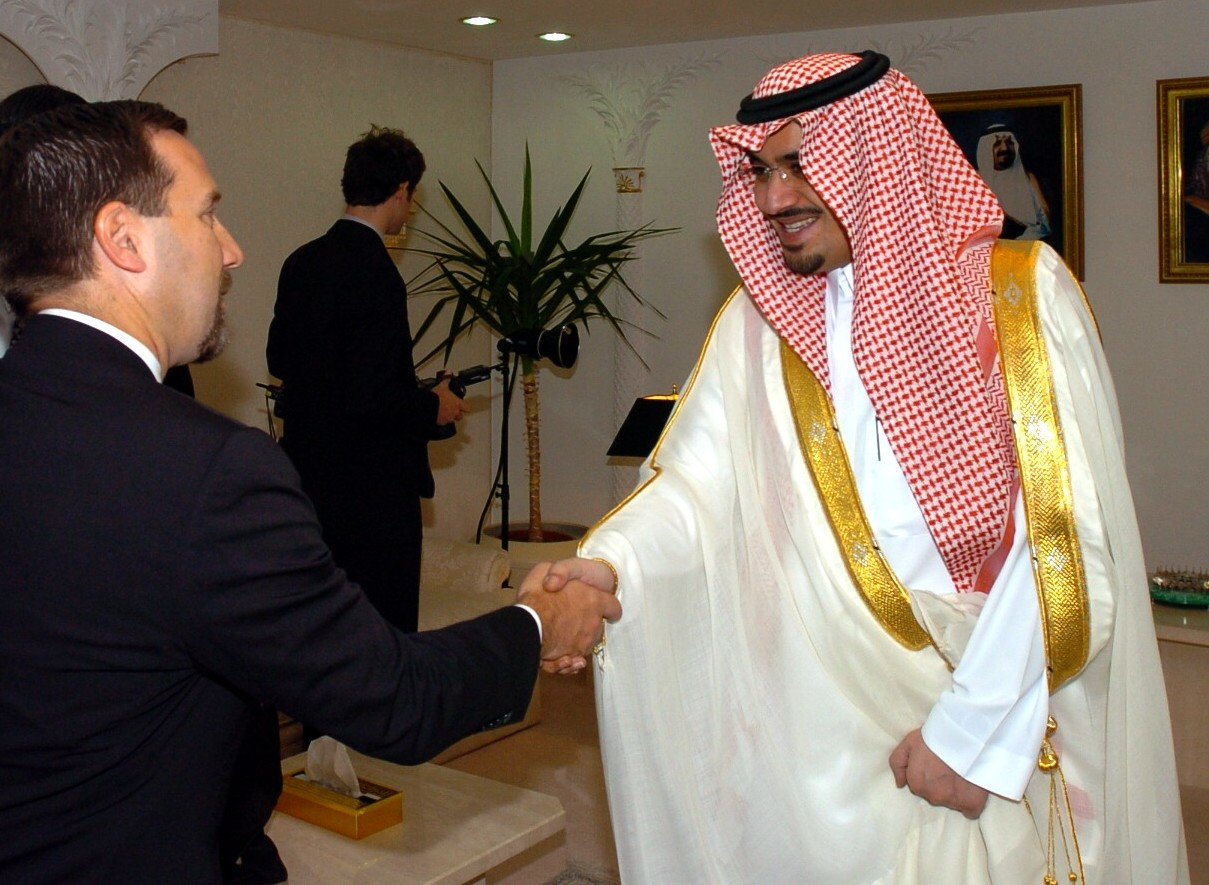
- Nawaf bin Faisal (2006)

President General of Youth Welfare (Ministry of Youth and Sport)
- In office: January 2011 – June 2013
- Predecessor: Sultan bin Fahd Al Saud
- Successor: Abdullah bin Musaid Al Saud
- Born: 1 April 1978 (age 48)
Names
- Nawaf bin Faisal bin Fahd bin Abdulaziz al Saud
- House: Saud
- Father: Faisal bin Fahd
- Mother: Munira bint Sultan bin Abdulaziz
- Education: King Saud University

Nawaf bin Faisal Al Saud (Arabic: نواف بن فيصل آل سعود; born 1 April 1978) is a Saudi Arabian government official who served as the president of the Saudi Arabian Olympic Committee from 2011 to 2013. He is also a former president of youth welfare. A member of the House of Saud, he is a grandson of King Fahd and Prince Sultan bin Abdulaziz.

== Early life and education ==
Nawaf was born on 1 April 1978. He is the eldest son of Prince Faisal bin Fahd, himself the eldest son of King Fahd. His mother was Princess Munira bint Sultan, a daughter of King Fahd's brother Sultan bin Abdulaziz. Princess Munira died in June 2011 at age 59.

Nawaf holds a bachelor of law degree from the faculty of administrative sciences at King Saud University. He graduated in 1998.

== Positions held ==
Nawaf bin Faisal was formerly vice-president of the Saudi Youth Hostels Society. He has been president of the Saudi Arabia Football Federation until his resignation on 1 March 2012. He confirmed he had resigned from his post following the national team's early exit from 2014 World Cup qualifying. He was elected to the IOC in 2002, but resigned in 2014 after leaving the presidency of the Saudi Arabian Olympic Committee.

He served as the deputy president of youth welfare. He was then appointed president general of youth welfare, and replaced his uncle, Sultan bin Fahd. Prince Nawaf's term ended in June 2013 as the president of youth welfare and Abdullah bin Musaed Al Saud replaced him in the post.

He is also the former president of the Saudi Arabian Olympic Committee, president of Federation of Arab National Olympic Committees, and executive president of the Union of Arab Football Associations (Pan-Arab Football Federation). He is also an ambassador for Peace and Sport, a Monaco-based international organization, committed to serving peace in the world through sport.

== Controversy ==
According to Al Hayat newspaper, Crown Prince Nayef bin Abdulaziz said in April 2012 that women can represent Saudi at the Olympics in London as long as they do not contradict Islamic laws. His approval was conditioned on women competing in sports that "meet the standards of women's decency and don't contradict Islamic laws," though even this concession seemed surprising. Yet only a few days later, the head of the Saudi Olympic Committee, Nawaf bin Faysal, explicitly ruled out sending women athletes to the London Olympics. "We are not endorsing any Saudi female participation at the moment in the Olympics or other international championships," he told a press conference in Jiddah. Nawwaf added that Saudi women taking part on their own were free to do so, and the Kingdom's Olympic authority would "help in ensuring that their participation does not violate the Islamic shari'a law." Though he did emphasize that this was in accordance with a previously-stated position, it did seem a rebuff to Prince Nayef.

Arab youth and sports ministers on 4 April 2012 announced their boycott of sports apparel manufacturer Adidas over the company's sponsorship of last month's Jerusalem marathon. "All companies that have sponsored the marathon of Jerusalem, including Adidas, will be boycotted," said Nawaf bin Faisal, chairman of the Arab youth and sports council of ministers, after a meeting in Jeddah. He told that the ministers also agreed to organise a separate marathon next year to coincide with the annual Jerusalem event.

| Preceded by Sultan bin Fahd Al Saud | President of the Islamic Solidarity Sports Federation; 3 October 2011 – 4 December 2014 | Succeeded by Abdullah bin Musaid Al Saud |
