= Latifa bint Fahd Al Saud =

Saudi royal (1959–2013)

- Born: 1959
- Died: December 2013 (aged 53–54); Geneva, Switzerland
- Burial: Al Oud cemetery, Riyadh
Names
- Latifa bint Fahd bin Abdulaziz bin Abdul Rahman Al Saud
- House: Al Saud
- Father: King Fahd
- Mother: Al Anoud bint Abdulaziz bin Musaed Al Jiluwi

Latifa bint Fahd Al Saud (Arabic: لطيفة بنت فهد آل سعود; 1959 – December 2013) was a member of the Saudi royal family and one of King Fahd's children. She was one of the grandchildren of Saudi Arabia's founder King Abdulaziz.

== Biography ==
Princess Latifa was the eldest daughter of Fahd and Al Anoud bint Abdulaziz bin Musaed Al Jiluwi. Her full brothers included Faisal bin Fahd, Mohammed bin Fahd, Sultan bin Fahd, Saud bin Fahd and Khalid bin Fahd. In Riyadh, she founded Princess Latifa bint Fahd Center which provides support for patients who are treated at King Fahd Medical City.

In September 2013, Princess Latifa bought a historical Geneva estate from a wealthy family, Nordmann, for $62m. As of 2013, it was the second-highest price on record for an estate in the city. Then she settled and lived there until December 2013, when she died at age 54. Funeral ceremony was held for her at Imam Turki bin Abdullah Mosque in Riyadh following the noon prayer.
