= Durosinmi =

- Gender: Unisex
- Language: Yoruba

Origin
- Origin: Yorubaland
- Meaning: Stay to bury me
- Region of origin: Yorubaland [Nigeria, Benin, Togo]

Dúrósinmí is a given name and a surname. It is a unisex name and of Yoruba origin, which means "Stay to bury me". Dúrósinmí is a powerful name with depth and profound meaning. It is an abíkú name. The name Dúrósinmí is more commonly associated with male individuals. The diminutive forms include Dúró and/or Sinmí, in shorter forms.

== Notable Individuals with the Name ==
- Adefolarin Durosinmi (born 1991), Nigerian footballer.
- Lateefah Durosinmi (born 1957), Nigerian chemist and academic.
- Rafiu Durosinmi (born 2003), Nigerian footballer.
