= Islamic Solidarity Sports Association =

Authority governing the Islamic Solidarity Games

Islamic Solidarity Sports Association الاتحاد الرياضي للتضامن الاسلامي
- Formation: 8 May 1985; 41 years ago
- Type: Sports Federation
- Headquarters: Riyadh, Saudi Arabia
- Members: 57 Countries
- Official language: Arabic, English and French
- President: HRH Prince Abdulaziz bin Turki Al Saud (Saudi Arabia)
- 1st Vice-President: Colonel Hamad Kalkaba Malboum (Cameroon)
- Secretary General: Nasser Ayman Majali (Jordan)
- Website: issa.sport issa.sport/en

The Islamic Solidarity Sports Association (ISSA; Arabic: الاتحاد الرياضي للتضامن الاسلامي) is the supreme authority governing the Islamic Solidarity Games. It is an international, non-profit, non-governmental organization based in Riyadh, Saudi Arabia. Its mission is to increase the cooperation between its member countries through sports. Currently, HRH Prince Abdulaziz bin Turki Al Saud from the Kingdom of Saudi Arabia is ISSA President since 8 April 2019.

The Islamic Solidarity Sports Association (ISSA) was previously called the Islamic Solidarity Sports Federation (ISSF).

== History ==
At their 3rd Islamic Summit Conference held in Mecca and Ta'if (1981), the leaders of Islamic world adopted a decision to establish the Islamic Solidarity Sports Association (ISSA) in order to serve the needs of the OIC member countries in all aspects of sports activities. In 1985 and at the initiative of President of Youth Welfare of Saudi Arabia Prince Faisal bin Fahd bin Abdulaziz Al Saud, the OIC invited the NOCs and Youth and Sports governmental organizations in Muslim countries to attend the constituent assembly for the foundation of the ISSA in the Saudi Arabia. Representatives of 34 Muslim countries attended this assembly and ratified the ISSA statute. Under the guidance of the Government of the Saudi Arabia, Prince Faisal bin Fahd announced the allocation of the ISSA headquarters to be at the Saudi Arabian Olympic Committee complex in Riyadh city. He also announced the allocation of an annual subsidy from the Kingdom of Saudi Arabia for the administration of the ISSA.

- 1980: Decision of Ministry of Foreign Affairs
- 1981: 3rd Islamic Summit Conference in Mecca
- 1985: ISSF Formally Established
- 2005: Inaugural Islamic Solidarity Games
- 2023: The organization Rebranded from ISSF to ISSA

== Members ==
57 nations (29% of the world countries) from 4 continents:

1. Europe (3): Albania, Azerbaijan, Türkiye
2. Asia (25): Afghanistan, Bahrain, Bangladesh, Brunei Darussalam, Indonesia, Iran, Iraq ,Jordan ,Kazakhstan, Kuwait, Kyrgyzstan, Lebanon, Malaysia, Maldives, Oman, Pakistan, Palestine, Qatar, Saudi Arabia, Syria, Tajikistan, Turkmenistan, United Arab Emirates, Uzbekistan, Yemen
3. Africa (27): Algeria, Benin, Burkina Faso, Cameroon, Chad, Comoros, Côte d'Ivoire, Djibouti, Egypt, Gabon, Gambia, Guinea, Guinea-Bissau, Libya, Mali, Mauritania, Morocco, Mozambique, Niger, Nigeria, Senegal, Sierra Leone, Somalia, Sudan, Togo, Tunisia, Uganda
4. South America (2): Guyana, Suriname

== Crest ==
Former logo

Present logo

== ISSA Presidents ==
S.No.	Name	Country	Tenure
1.	Prince Faisal bin Fahd	Saudi Arabia	8 May 1985 – 7 February 2000
2.	Prince Sultan bin Fahd	Saudi Arabia	7 February 2000 – 3 October 2011
3.	Prince Nawaf bin Faisal	Saudi Arabia	3 October 2011 – 4 December 2014
4.	Prince Abdullah bin Mosaad Al Saud	Saudi Arabia	4 December 2014 – 20 November 2017
5.	Turki Al-Sheikh†	Saudi Arabia	20 November 2017 – 28 December 2018
Acting	Colonel Hamad Kalkaba Malboum	Cameroon	28 December 2018 – 8 April 2019
6.	HRH Prince Abdulaziz bin Turki Al Saud	Saudi Arabia	8 April 2019 – present

†Turki bin Abdulmohsen bin Abdul Latif Al-Sheikh resigned on 28 December 2018.

== ISSA Executive Board ==
The ISSA shall be steered by an Executive Board composed of 17 members, 13 of whom shall be elected directly by the General Assembly. The composition shall be as follows: The President, one vice-president and two members from each continent i.e. Asia, Europe, Africa and Latin America. Secretary General and Treasurer shall be nominated by the headquarters country and approved by the General Assembly. One representative of the OIC is appointed by the OIC Secretary General. One representative of the country hosting the next edition of Islamic Solidarity Games but without voting rights. The mandate of the Executive Board membership shall be of four years and renewable. Following is the current Executive Board serving 2017 – 2021 term.

Designation	Name	Country
President	HRH Prince Abdulaziz bin Turki Al Saud	Saudi Arabia
1st Vice-President	Colonel Hamad Kalkaba Malboum	Cameroon
2nd Vice-President	Dr. Chingiz Huseynzade	Azerbaijan
3rd Vice-President	General Ahmed Mohamed Fouly	Egypt
4th Vice-President	Nihat Usta	Turkey
Secretary General	Nasser Ayman Majali	Jordan
Treasurer	Abdulaziz bin Saad Al-Dallak	Saudi Arabia
Board Member	Kazi Rajib Uddin Ahmed Chapol	Bangladesh
Board Member	General Idriss Dokony	Chad
Board Member	Saeed Abdulghaffar Hussain	United Arab Emirates
Board Member	Salim Ssenkungu Musoke	Uganda
Board Member	Indra Gamulya	Indonesia
Board Member	Ammar Brahmia	Algeria
Board Member	Nasser Ayman Majali	Jordan
Board Member	Omar Diagne	Senegal
Representative of OIC	Ambassador Tariq Ali Bakheet	Sudan
Representative of Palestine	General Jebral Al-Rojoob	Palestine
Representative for Women & Sports	Mrs. Konul Nurullayeva	Azerbaijan
Representative of 6th ISG 2025	HH Prince Fahad bin Jalawi Al Saud	Saudi Arabia

== Games ==
- Islamic Solidarity Games

== See also ==
- Islamic Games of North America (Annual competition for Islamic Centers, Leagues, sports academies, Organizations and Muslim Schools in USA and Canada in 15 Sports and 10 Fitness Challenge since 1989)
- Women's Islamic Games
- 1980 Islamic Games
- Muslim World
- Islam by country
- Muslim population growth
