= Latifa =

Latifa, Lateefa or Lateefah is a feminine Arabic (لٓطِيفٓة) given name which means "gentle", "nice" or "pleasant". It corresponds to the masculine Latif.

== Notable persons ==
=== Lateefa(h) ===
- Lateefa Al Gaood, Bahraini politician
- Lateefah Durosinmi (born 1957), Nigerian academic
- Lateefah Simon (born 1977), American activist

=== Latifa ===
- Latifa (singer) (born 1961), or Latifa Arfaoui, Tunisian pop music singer
- Princess Fawzia-Latifa of Egypt (born 1982), Egyptian princess
- Latifa Baka (born 1964), Moroccan author
- Latifa Elouadrhiri (born 1952), Moroccan physicist
- Princess Lalla Latifa (1943/44-2024), widow of king Hassan II
- Latifa bint Mohammed Al Maktoum (born 1985), UAE princess
- Latifa Ben Mansour (born 1950), Algerian writer and linguist
- Latifa bint Fahd Al Saud (1959–2013), Saudi royal
- Latifa al-Zayyat (1923–1996), Egyptian activist and writer
- Latifa al-Droubi (born 1984), First Lady of Syria and wife of Syrian President Ahmed al-Sharaa

=== Latifah ===
- Queen Latifah (born 1970), American rapper, singer, and actress
- Latifah Bee Ghows (1911–2005), Malaysian physician

== Sufi psychology ==
- Lataif-e-Sitta, special perception organs in Sufi spiritual psychology, for example Latifa Qalabiya

== See also ==
- Latife, the Turkish form of the name
