= General Intelligence Presidency =

Intelligence agency of Saudi Arabia

General Intelligence Presidency (GIP)
- رئاسة الاستخبارات العامة; Ri'āsat Al-Istikhbārāt Al-'Āmah as-Suʿūdiyyah
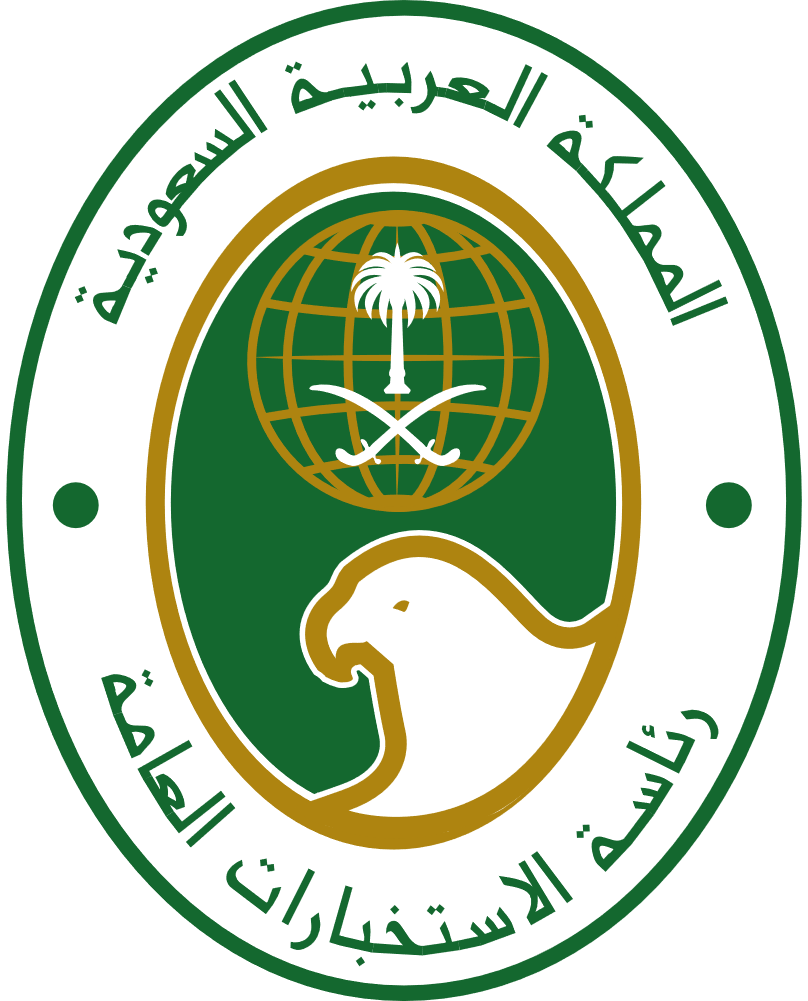
- Seal of the General Intelligence Presidency

Agency overview
- Formed: 1956; 70 years ago
- Preceding agency: Al-Mabahith Al-Aammah
- Jurisdiction: Government of Saudi Arabia
- Headquarters: Riyadh, Saudi Arabia
- Annual budget: $500 million (as of 2006)
- Agency executives: Lt. Gen. Khalid bin Ali Al Humaidan, Director; Lt. Gen. Mohammed bin Amer bin Mohammed Al Harbi, Deputy Director
- Website: www.gip.gov.sa

The General Intelligence Presidency (GIP) (Arabic: (ر.ا.ع) رئاسة الاستخبارات العامة Ri'āsat Al-Istikhbārāt Al-'Āmah) is the primary intelligence agency of Saudi Arabia. It was formed in 1956.

== Structure ==
The highest authority for GIP is the King of Saudi Arabia, King Salman. In accordance with Article 60 of the Basic Law, he has the authority to dismiss and appoint the directors.

From 2005 to 2012, Prince Muqrin was the Director General of the GIP and Prince Faisal ibn Abdullah ibn Muhammed Al Saud was his deputy.

== History ==
The role of intelligence was recognized by King Abdulaziz Al Saud who had used it in his unification of Saudi Arabia. His interest in modern communication increasingly grew when he set up the first radio communications system in Saudi Arabia. The kingdom started the intelligence service in 1955 under the name of Al-Mabahith Al Aammah.

During the reign of King Saud bin Abdulaziz, the General Intelligence was separated from the Mabahith (General Investigation Directorate). Intelligence was established as an independent security service with the issuing of the Royal Decree 11 in 1957 that ordered the setting up of a special department under the title of Maslahat Al-Istikhbarat Al-Aammah or (General Intelligence Department). During this period two branches of the Presidency were set up locally, the western branch in Jeddah, and eastern one in Dhahran.

The GIP expanded under King Faisal bin Abdulaziz, with the opening of offices abroad. The agency expanded its monitoring of internal threats after the 1979 capture of the Grand Mosque in Mecca.

The GIP's charter was changed by King Khaled bin Abdulaziz in 1982, by Royal Decree M-5, dated 19 December 1982, which set out its responsibilities, duties, and the limits of its activities. This established the internal organization of the agency with a General Department for Operations, the General Department for Administration and Finance, the General Department for Training and Planning, and the General Department for Technical Affairs. Along with the National Research Center, and the Center for Media and International Communications (previously Center for Translation and Media).

In 1997, the Office for External Communications was transferred to the Presidency from the Presidency of the Council of Ministers. Its name was also changed to the General Department for External Communications, and it was strengthened with the addition of high-tech equipment and specialists in radio surveillance. This period saw the expansion of the activities of the agency abroad with the establishment and development of more offices in other countries, and through more effort to organize its work.

During the reign of King Fahd bin Abdulaziz the Higher Committee for Development was set up and was chaired by the President of the General Intelligence Presidency; its membership consisted of the heads of the various departments of the GIP. Also during the tenure of King Fahd, the administrative structuring of the Information Center was approved.

In late January 2013, Interior Minister Prince Muhammad bin Nayef announced that Saudi women would be allowed to work at the directorate.

=== Safari Club ===
The Safari Club was an alliance of intelligence services formed in 1976 that ran covert operations around Africa at a time when the United States Congress had clipped the CIA's wings over years of abuses. Its formal members were Iran, Egypt, Saudi Arabia, Morocco, and France. The group maintained informal connections with the United States.

The group executed a successful military intervention in Zaire in response to an invasion from Angola. It also provided arms to Somalia in its 1977–1978 conflict with Ethiopia. It organized secret diplomacy relating to anti-communism in Africa, and has been credited with initiating the process resulting in the 1979 Egypt–Israel peace treaty.

=== Soviet Afghan War and Afghan Civil Wars ===
The Soviet–Afghan War lasted over nine years, from December 1979 to February 1989. Insurgent groups known collectively as the mujahideen, as well as smaller Maoist groups, fought a guerrilla war against the Soviet Army and the Democratic Republic of Afghanistan government, mostly in the rural countryside. The mujahideen groups were backed primarily by the United States, Saudi Arabia, and Pakistan, making it a Cold War proxy war. Saudi Arabia would continue to support certain factions of the Mujahedeen against the Afghan government of Mohammad Najibullah following the withdrawal of Soviet forces from the country.

=== Cargo planes bomb plot ===
On 29 October 2010, two packages, each containing a bomb consisting of 300 to 400 grams (11–14 oz) of plastic explosives and a detonating mechanism, were found on separate cargo planes. The bombs were discovered as a result of intelligence received from Saudi Arabia's security chief. They were bound from Yemen to the United States, and were discovered at en route stop-overs, one at East Midlands Airport in the UK and one in Dubai in the United Arab Emirates.

One week later, al-Qaeda in the Arabian Peninsula (AQAP) took responsibility for the plot, and for the crash of UPS Airlines Flight 6. American and British authorities believed Anwar al-Awlaki of AQAP was behind the bombing attempts, and that the bombs were most likely constructed by AQAP's main explosives expert, Ibrahim Hassan al-Asiri. The bombs were probably designed to detonate mid-air, with the intention of destroying both planes over Chicago or another city in the U.S. Each bomb had already been transported on passenger and cargo planes at the time of discovery.

=== Syrian Civil War ===
Saudi Arabia's involvement in the Syrian War involved the large-scale supply of weapons and ammunition to various rebel groups in Syria during the Syrian civil war.

The Financial Times reported in May 2013 that Qatar was becoming a larger provider of arms to the various groups. In the summer of 2013 Saudi Arabia emerged as the main group financing and arming the rebels. Saudi Arabia financed a large purchase of infantry weapons, such as Yugoslav-made recoilless guns and the M79 Osa, an anti-tank weapon, from Croatia via shipments shuttled through Jordan. The weapons began reaching rebels in December 2012 which allowed rebels' small tactical gains against the Syrian army. This shipment was said to be to counter shipments of weapons from Iran to aid the Syrian government.

Saudi Arabia, Turkey and Qatar have received criticism from the Western media for backing certain Syrian rebels associated with the Army of Conquest, which includes the al-Nusra front, an al-Qaeda affiliated group.

In August 2017, the Syrian opposition was informed by the Saudi foreign minister that the Kingdom was disengaging from them. Subsequently, Saudi Arabia has taken a more conciliatory stance towards the Syrian government.

=== Timber Sycamore ===
Timber Sycamore was a classified weapons supply and training program run by the United States Central Intelligence Agency (CIA) and supported by Arab intelligence services, including the security service in Saudi Arabia. Launched in 2012 or 2013, it supplied money, weaponry and training to rebel forces fighting Syrian President Bashar al-Assad in the Syrian civil war. According to US officials, the program trained thousands of rebels.

== Leadership ==
- Mohammed bin Abdullah Al-Aiban (1955–1958)
- Saeed bin Abdullah Kurdi (1958–1964)
- Omar Mahmoud Shams (1964–1965)
- Sheik Kamal Adham (1965-1979):The first president of Al Mukhabarat Al A'amah was Sheik Kamal Adham, who served from 1965 to 1979.
- Turki Al-Faisal (1979-2001): Turki Al Faisal served as the president of Al Mukhabarat Al A'amah until 2001. Prince Turki resigned abruptly from his post tens days before the 9/11 attacks in 2001 (in which 14 Saudi nationals hijacked and crashed US commercial airliners) despite having had his appointment extended in May 2001 for another four years.
  - Deputy Director: Saud bin Fahd Al Saud
- Nawaf bin Abdulaziz (2001-2005) replaced Prince Turki on 1 September 2001. The organization was renamed "The General Intelligence Presidency" during Nawwaf's tenure. Nawwaf was relieved of his duty as the head of GIP by Crown Prince Abdullah on 25 January 2005. For nine months, nobody was appointed to head the presidency.
  - Deputy Director: Additionally, King Abdullah relieved Prince Saud bin Fahd Al Saud of his duties as vice president of GIP.
- Muqrin bin Abdulaziz (2005-2012) was appointed as head of the General Intelligence Presidency by King Abdullah bin Abdulaziz in October 2005.
  - Deputy Director: Faisal bin Abdullah bin Mohammed Al Saud was appointed as new Deputy Director of GIP.
- Prince Bandar bin Sultan (2012-2014) was appointed director general of Al Mukhabarat Al A'amah, replacing Muqrin bin Abdulaziz.
  - Deputy Director: Another Saudi royal, Prince Abdulaziz bin Bandar, who had been Deputy Director of the directorate, was relieved from his post.
  - Deputy Director: Youssef bin Ali Al Idrisi replaced him as vice head in October 2012.
- Youssef bin Ali Al Idrissi (2014): On 15 April 2014 Prince Bandar bin Sultan was removed from his position "at his own request" according to the announcement in the Saudi state media. It was reported that Prince Bandar would be replaced by his deputy, Youssef bin Ali Al Idrissi.
- Khalid bin Bandar Al Saud (2014-2015): However, Khalid bin Bandar Al Saud became the director general of the Al Mukhabarat Al A'amah on 30 June 2014. His term ended on 29 January 2015 when Khalid bin Ali Al Humaidan replaced him in the post.
- Khalid bin Ali Al Humaidan (2015–Present)

== See also ==
- Mabahith – Saudi Internal Intelligence Agency
- Presidency of State Security
- Sudairi Seven
- Allegiance Council
