= Saud bin Fahd Al Saud =

Saudi royal and former government official (born 1950)

Deputy Director of General Intelligence Presidency
- In office: 1985 – October 2005
- Monarch: King Fahd; King Abdullah
- Born: 8 October 1950 (age 75)
- Spouse: Madawi bint Musaed bin Abdulaziz Al Saud
Names
- Saud bin Fahd bin Abdulaziz bin Abdul Rahman Al Saud
- House: Al Saud
- Father: King Fahd
- Mother: Al Anoud bint Abdulaziz bin Musaed

Saud bin Fahd Al Saud (Arabic: سعود بن فهد بن عبد العزيز آل سعود; born 8 October 1950) is a Saudi Arabian businessman and the former Deputy Director of general intelligence directorate. He is a member of the House of Saud, son of King Fahd, and grandson of King Abdulaziz.

== Early life and education ==
Prince Saud was born on 8 October 1950. He is a son of King Fahd. His mother, Alanoud bint Abdulaziz bin Musaed, was from the Jiluwi branch of the Al Saud whose members intermarried with the Al Saud. She died, aged 76, of kidney failure in Santa Barbara in March 1999 after a long period of treatment in Los Angeles.

Prince Saud's full-brothers are Faisal bin Fahd, Mohammed bin Fahd, Sultan bin Fahd and Khaled bin Fahd. His full-sister was Latifa bint Fahd.

Prince Saud holds a bachelor's degree in economics from the United States.

== Career ==
Saud bin Fahd served as Deputy Director of General Intelligence Presidency from 1985 to October 2005. Therefore, he was deputy to Turki Al-Faisal and then to Nawwaf bin Abdulaziz. Saud bin Fahd has various business activities and is the founding member of the Faisal Bank in Egypt.

== Personal life ==
Saud bin Fahd is married to Madawi bint Musaed bin Abdulaziz Al Saud and has four children, two daughters and two sons. One of his daughters married Mansour bin Muqrin, son of Muqrin bin Abdulaziz, the former Crown Prince of Saudi Arabia. Saud bin Fahd is known for his religious observance.
