= Bouba (make-up artist) =

Lebanese make-up artist

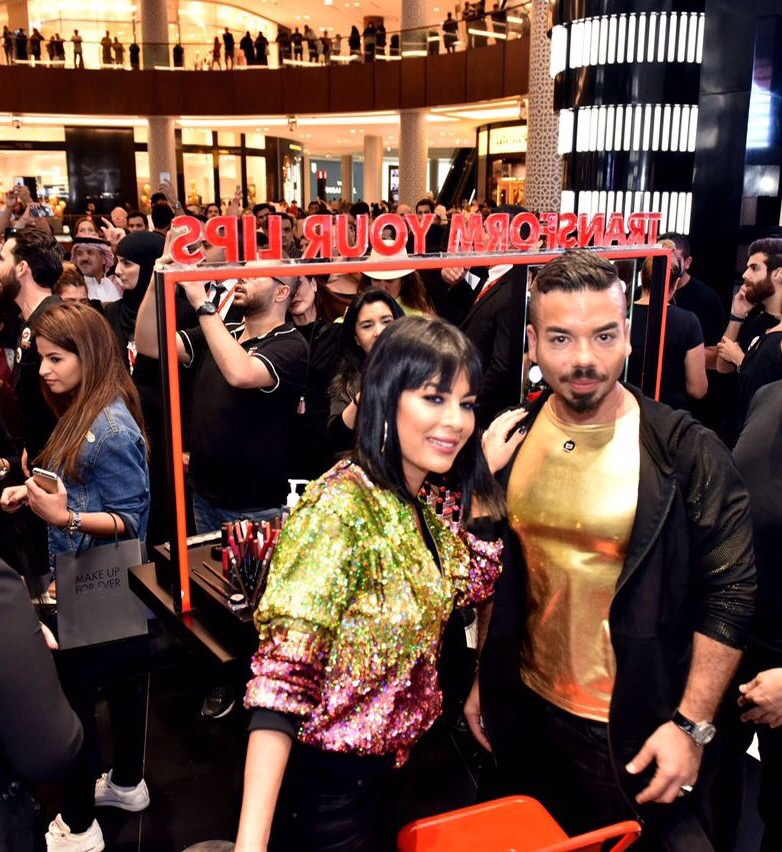
- Bouba (right) in Makeup Forever event with Maya Jules Haddad (left)
- Born: Beirut, Lebanon
- Occupation: Make-up artist
- Website: www.beautiquebybouba.com

Bouba a.k.a. Hamza Slim is a make-up artist based in Lebanon. He has worked with celebrities including Haifa Wehbe, Ahlam, Latifa, Shames, Shatha Hassoun, and Amar.

== Career ==
When he first moved back to Beirut in 2005 Bouba launched his career as a make-up artist in Verdun. Bouba participated in fashion events for Haute Couture designers including Nicolas Jebran, Vivienne Westwood, Dolce & Gabbana, and Garnier. He has worked with Layla Kanaan, Yehya Saade, Saiid Marouk, Sherif Tarhini, Walid Nassif, Fady Haddad, Joe Bou Eid, Yasser El Yassery, David Abdallah, Roger Moukarzel, Charbel Bou Mansour, Karin Bader, and Jean-Clause Bejjany.

He is also a representative of several beauty workshops around the Middle East and in Europe. In 2015, Bouba moved to the next step in his professional career by opening his own beauty center, Beautique by Bouba. The shop is located in Verdun and consists of a team of 8 members of make-up artists, manicurists, and beauty specialists.
