= Hessa al-Rifa'i =

Dr Hessa al-Rifa'i
- Born: 1947 (age 78–79)
- Citizenship: Kuwait
- Education: Indiana State University
- Employer: Kuwait University

Hessa al-Rifa'i (Arabic: حصة الرفاعي) (born 1947) is a folklorist and poet from Kuwait.

== Biography ==
Al-Rifa'i was born in Kuwait City in 1947. She studied for a BA in Arabic at Cairo University. She was awarded an MA in Folk Literature in 1971. She then went on to study for a PhD at Indiana State University, which she was awarded in 1982. In it she studied the impact of modernisation on the folk traditions of Kuwait.

Since 1982, al-Rifa'i has worked as a professor in the Department of Arabic Language at Kuwait University. Her poetry and her research are published in both English and Arabic.

She lives in Kuwait.

=== Folklore Studies ===
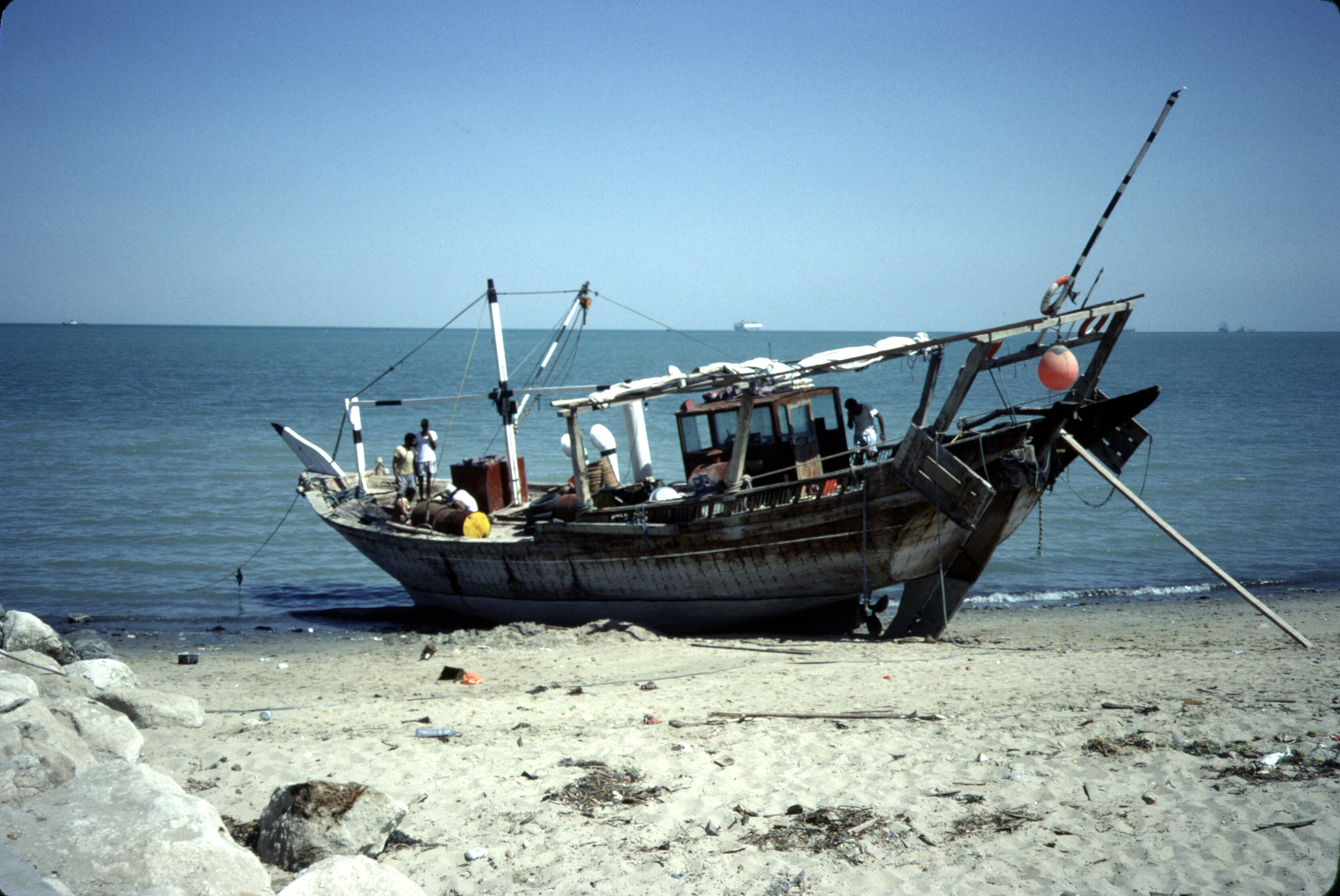
Fishing boat, Kuwait 1980

Al-Rifa'i is an expert in the culture and history of sea-songs and shanties, from Kuwait and the Arabian Gulf region. She studied has studied their musical structure, demonstrating that they follow Arabic melodic structures. She has also studied the movement of Arabic musical traditions across the Mediterranean to Andalusia. As well as the musical heritage of sea-shanties, al-Rifa'i has studied the cultural practices that go alongside: for example women performing rituals, such as placing a bar of hot iron in the sea, to ensure the safe return of fishermen. In addition, al-Rifa'i studies comparative folk literature, including the Cinderella narrative in Kuwaiti tradition. She has worked on the legacy of the folk-poet Zaid Al-Harb.

=== Poetry ===
Al-Rifa'i is a poet herself and has published four books of poetry.
