= Faisal bin Fahd Al Saud (1946–1999) =

Saudi royal and government official (26 December 1946–21 August 1999)

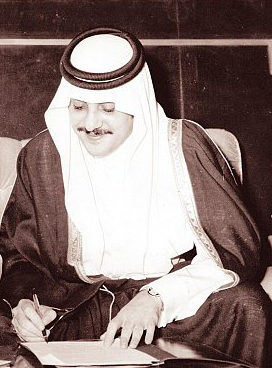
- Faisal bin Fahd in 1978

President of Youth Welfare
- In office: 1 July 1975 – 21 August 1999
- Predecessor: Khalid bin Faisal Al Saud
- Successor: Sultan bin Fahd
- Monarch: King Fahd
- Born: 1945
- Died: 21 August 1999 (aged 52); Riyadh
- Burial: 22 August 1999; Al Oud cemetery, Riyadh
- Spouse: Munira bint Sultan bin Abdulaziz Al Saud
Names
- Faisal bin Fahd bin Abdulaziz bin Abdul Rahman Al Saud
- House: Al Saud
- Father: King Fahd
- Mother: Al Anoud bint Abdulaziz bin Musaid
- Education: University of California at Santa Barbara

Faisal bin Fahd Al Saud (Arabic: فيصل بن فهد بن عبد العزيز آل سعود; 26 December 1946 – 21 August 1999) was the president of Youth Welfare in Saudi Arabia from 1975 to 1999. He was a member of the House of Saud, a son of King Fahd, and one of the grandsons of Saudi's founder King Abdulaziz.

== Early life and education ==
Faisal bin Fahd was born in 1945 as the eldest son of King Fahd. His mother, Al Anoud bint Abdulaziz bin Musaid, was from the Al Jiluwi branch of the Al Saud whose members intermarried with the members of the House of Saud. She was the younger sister of one of Prince Sultan's spouses. Al Anoud died, at the age of 76, of kidney failure in Santa Barbara in March 1999 after a long period of treatment in Los Angeles. His full brothers are Mohammed bin Fahd, Saud bin Fahd, Khaled bin Fahd and Sultan bin Fahd. His full sister was Latifa bint Fahd who died in December 2013.

Faisal bin Fahd studied political science and economics at the University of California at Santa Barbara, graduating in 1971.

== Career ==
Prince Faisal's first post was the president of Saudi fencing federation. In 1971, he was appointed as the chairman of the Saudi football federation. In July 1975, he became the president of Youth Welfare, replacing Khalid bin Faisal in the post. Faisal was promoted to the ministerial rank in 1977. He was also appointed as the chairman of the Saudi Arabian Olympic committee in 1975 and chairman of the Arab games federation in 1976. He was also director-general at the ministry of planning starting in 1977. After 1977, he held the rank of minister of state and was a private "emissary to Iraq." Unlike his brothers, his business activities were not intensive.

In 1981, he chaired the sports federation for Islamic solidarity, and in 1982, the international committee for the preservation of the legacy of Islamic civilization. From 1979 to his death, he chaired the Kingdom's supreme committee for the merit in literature prize. He had been the chairman of the Saudi Arabian society for youth hostels since 1973. Later, he became a member of the International Olympic Committee in 1984. He was also the president of the Arabian football union and head of the national committee on drugs control, to which he had been appointed in 1984. He served internationally as the president of the international swimming association. In 1992, he became the chairman of the Saudi federation of sports for the disabled.

== Personal life ==
Prince Faisal had two sons, Prince Nawaf and Prince Khalid, and three daughters. His wife was Munira bint Sultan, a daughter of Sultan bin Abdulaziz who died in June 2011 at age 59. His daughter, Haifa, is the spouse of Saud bin Khalid bin Abdullah.

== Death and funeral ==
Faisal bin Fahd died of a heart attack in King Faisal Specialist Hospital in Riyadh on 21 August 1999, shortly after returning from the Pan Arab Games held in Jordan. He was admitted to the hospital due to his heart problems a day before the death. His father, King Fahd, could not return to Saudi Arabia from Marbella to attend Faisal's funeral due to his medical condition that did not allow him to make a journey. On 21 August 1999, funeral prayers were held for him in Riyadh with the participation of then Crown Prince Abdullah, Prince Sultan, Prince Nayef and hundreds of Saudis. Mourners also included then Crown Prince Hamza of Jordan, the former Lebanese Prime Minister Rafik Hariri and Bahrain's Prime Minister, Shaikh Khalifa bin Salman, and Crown Prince, Shaikh Salman bin Hamad.

Preceded by Office established	President of the Islamic Solidarity Sports Federation; 8 May 1985 – 7 February 2000	Succeeded by Sultan bin Fahd Al Saud
