= Abdulaziz bin Bandar Al Saud =

Saudi royal (born 1961)

Deputy intelligence chief
- Reign: 2010 – October 2012
- Successor: Youssef bin Ali Al Idrissi
- Born: 1961 (age 64–65); Riyadh, Saudi Arabia
- Spouse: Najla bint Saad bin Mohammed Al Saud
Names
- Abdulaziz bin Bandar bin Abdulaziz bin Abdul Rahman bin Faisal Al Saud
- House: Al Saud
- Father: Bandar bin Abdulaziz

Abdulaziz bin Bandar Al Saud (born 1961) is a Saudi royal, a grandson of Saudi's founder King Abdulaziz, and a businessman who was assistant intelligence chief from 2004 to 2012.

== Early life ==
Prince Abdulaziz was born in Riyadh in 1961 to Prince Bandar, a son of King Abdulaziz.

== Career ==
Abdulaziz bin Bandar was named assistant intelligence chief in 2004 and promoted to the position of deputy Intelligence chief of in 2010. He was an assistant to Prince Muqrin bin Abdulaziz, the head of the agency. Youssef bin Ali Al Idrissi replaced him in October 2012. Abdulaziz has several business activities.

== Personal life ==
Prince Abdulaziz is married to Najla bint Saad bin Mohammed Al Saud. One of their sons, Prince Talal bin Abdulaziz, married Sarah bint Fahd, a daughter of King Salman's eldest son Fahd bin Salman. Their marriage ceremony was held in Marbella on 2 July 2011. Prince Talal was a lieutenant colonel at the Royal Saudi Air Force and died in a military airplane crash in the Eastern Province during a training mission on 7 December 2023.
