= Latife =

Latife is a Turkish feminine given name derived from the name Latifa. Notable people with the name include:

- Latife Tekin (born 1957), Turkish writer
- Latife Uşaki (1898–1975), wife of Mustafa Kemal Atatürk
