= Khalid bin Ali Al Humaidan =

Saudi intelligence officer (born 1955)

Director General of General Intelligence Directorate
- Incumbent
- Assumed office 29 January 2015
- Preceded by: Khalid bin Bandar Al Saud

Deputy Head of the Criminal Investigation Division
- In office 2011–2015

Personal details
- Born: 1955 (age 70–71) Ha'il, Saudi Arabia
- Education: Saginaw Valley State University

Khalid bin Ali Al Humaidan (Arabic: خالد الحميدان; born 1955) is a Saudi intelligence officer. He is the director general of General Intelligence Directorate. He took over from the former chief Youssef bin Ali Al Idrissi in 2015.

== Early life and education ==
Khalid bin Ali Al Humaidan was born in Ha'il, a city in the Northern region of Saudi Arabia, in 1955. He studied criminal justice at Saginaw Valley State University in the United States.

== Career ==
Al Humaidan enrolled in the Saudi Military in 1982. He was in the army for over 20 years before he was appointed deputy head of the criminal investigation division in Saudi Arabia in 2011. After this appointment, he was promoted to the rank of lieutenant general.

In January 2015, he was appointed head of intelligence through a royal decree. Al Humaidan was also made a member of Saudi Arabia's Political and Security Affairs Council. The subject maintained communications with Mohammed Abdul Salam, the chief Houthi peace negotiator after talks were chilled by the Houthi attack of January 2017 and his deputy met with Hussein al-Ezzi in Amman later in the year.
