= Saudi Futsal Premier League =

Premier League
- Organising body: SAFF
- Founded: 2019; 7 years ago
- Country: Saudi Arabia
- Confederation: AFC
- Number of clubs: 20
- Level on pyramid: Level 1
- Relegation to: First Division League
- Domestic cup: SAFF Futsal Cup
- International cup: AFC Club Championship
- Current champions: Al-Ettifaq (3rd title) (2023–24)
- Most championships: Al-Ettifaq (3 titles)
- Website: SAFF.com.sa
- Current: 2024–25 season

The Saudi Futsal Premier League (Arabic: الدوري السعودي الممتاز لكرة قدم الصالات) is the premier professional futsal league in Saudi Arabia.

With three titles in the competition's new format and two in the old, Al-Ettifaq is the most decorated club in its history.

== History ==
The first-ever Saudi Futsal League was established in 2015, with 38 clubs competing in the inaugural edition. Al-Ettifaq won the first title.

== Clubs ==
The following 20 clubs are competing in the 2024–25 season.

Group A
Club	Location	Stadium
Al-Nassr	Riyadh	Al-Nassr Club Arena
Al-Qadsiah	Khobar	Al-Qadsiah Club Arena
Al-Ula	Medina	Prince Mohammed bin Abdulaziz Arena
As-Sarawath	Abha	Prince Sultan bin Abdulaziz Arena
Al-Ard	Dawadmi	Al-Dera Club Arena
Al-Thuqbah	Dammam	Green Arena
Al-Tai	Ḥaʼil	Prince Abdulaziz bin Musa'ed Arena
Al-Alamin	Dammam	Green Arena
Al-Raed	Buraidah	Al-Raed Club Arena
Al-Shabab	Riyadh	Al-Shabab Club Arena

Group B
Club	Location	Stadium
Al-Ettifaq	Dammam	Ettifaq Club Arena
Munief	Taif	King Fahd Arena
Al-Riyadh	Riyadh	Al-Riyadh Club Arena
Al-Sir	Shaqra	Al-Washm Club Arena
Radwa	Yanbu	Al-Majd Club Arena
Al-Wadi	Wadi ad-Dawasir	Prince Nasser bin Abdulaziz Arena
Al-Majd	Yanbu	Al-Majd Club Arena
Al-Eetemad	Al-Ghat	Al-Hamadah Club Arena
Al-Zulfi	Al Zulfi	Al-Zulfi Club Arena
Faid	Ḥaʼil	Prince Abdulaziz bin Musa'ed Arena

== Seasons ==
Saudi Futsal League
#	Season	Winners	Score	Runners-up	Third place	Score	Fourth place
1	2015–16	Al-Ettifaq	[RR]	Al-Hilal	Al-Qadsiah	[RR]	Jeddag
2	2016–17	Al-Qadsiah	Agg: 11–8	Al-Ettifaq	Mosdh	Agg: 6–3	Al-Shaeib
3	2017–18	Al-Ettifaq	[RR]	Al-Qadsiah	Al-Ard	[RR]	Al-Shaeib
4	2018–19	Al-Qadsiah	[RR]	Al-Shaeib	Al-Ard	[RR]	Al-Ettifaq
Saudi Futsal Premier League
#	Season	Winners	Score	Runners-up	Third place	Score	Fourth place
1	2019–20	Al-Ettifaq	7–4	Al-Qadsiah	Al-Ula	7–4	Al-Ard
2	2020–21	Al-Qadsiah	5–3	Al-Ettifaq	Al-Ard	6–3	Al-Thuqbah
3	2021–22	Al-Ettifaq	5–2	Al-Qadsiah	Al-Ard	8–4	Radwa
4	2022–23	Al-Riyadh	4–3	Al-Ettifaq	Al-Qadsiah	5–2	Al-Nassr
5	2023–24	Al-Ettifaq	4–2	Al-Nassr	Al-Qadsiah	4–3	Munief
6	2024–25	Al-Ula	5–3 (a.e.t.)	Al-Nassr	Al-Qadsiah	5–2	As-Sarawath

== See also ==
- Saudi Arabia national futsal team
