= Youssef bin Ali Al Idrissi =

Saudi intelligence officer

Director General of General Intelligence Directorate
- In office April 2014 – 2015
- Preceded by: Bandar bin Sultan Al Saud
- Succeeded by: Khalid bin Bandar Al Saud

Youssef bin Ali Al Idrissi (Arabic: يوسف بن علي الإدريسي) is a Saudi intelligence officer. He was appointed deputy intelligence chief in October 2012, replacing Abdulaziz bin Bandar, a grandson of King Abdulaziz. Al Idrissi was named the director of the General Intelligence Directorate in April 2014. He was succeeded by Khalid bin Ali Al Humaidan in 2015.

In March 2020 Al Idrissi was detained due to his alleged involvement in a coup against Crown Prince Mohammed bin Salman.
