= Abdullah bin Musaed Al Saud =

Saudi royal and businessman

Abdullah bin Mosaad Al Saud
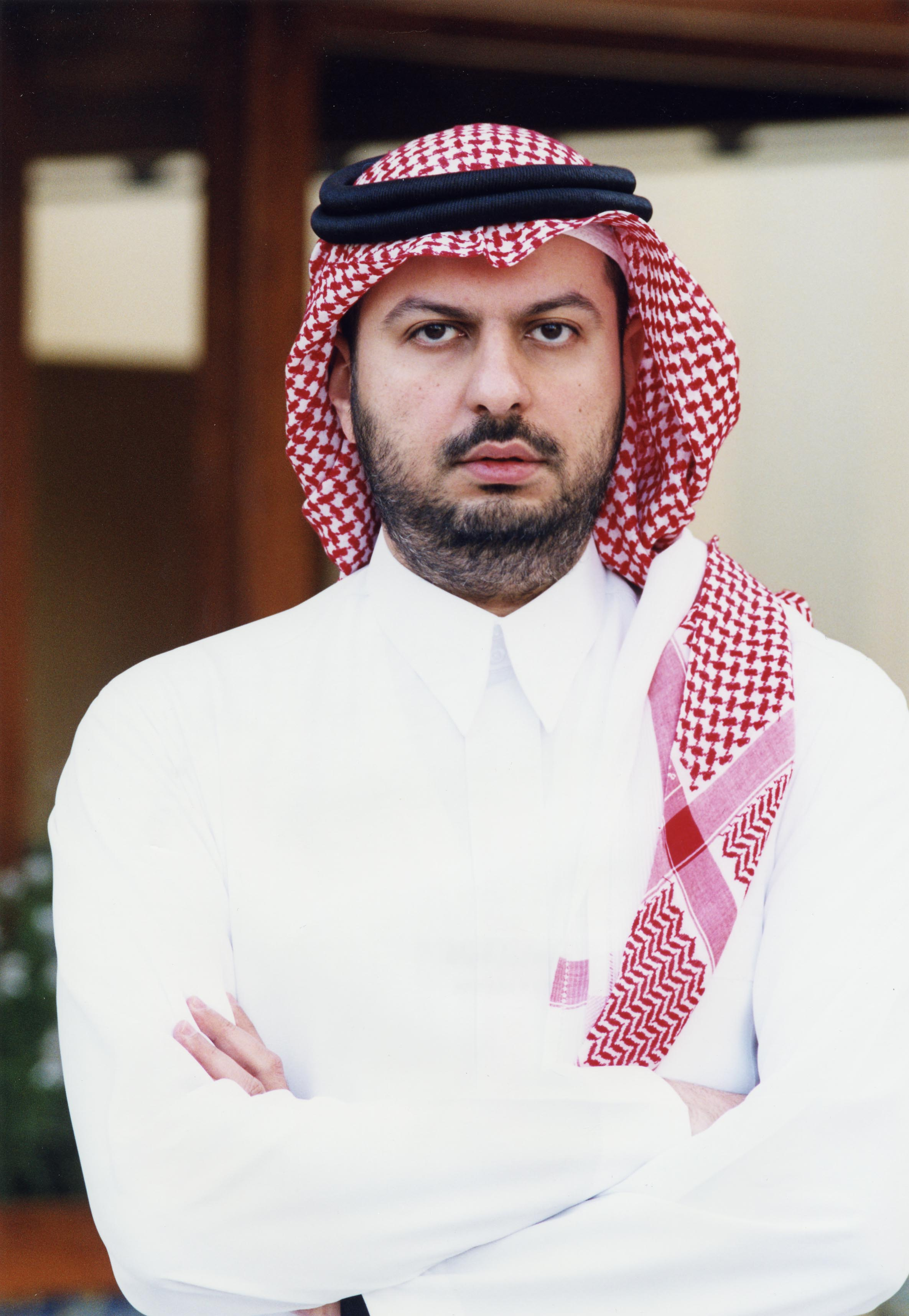
- Prince Abdullah c. 2013
- Born: 19 February 1965 (age 61); Riyadh, Saudi Arabia
- Spouse: Jawaher bint Fahd bin Abdullah Al Saud
Names
- Abdullah bin Mosaad bin Abdulaziz bin Abdul Rahman Al Saud
- House: Al Saud
- Father: Mosaad bin Abdulaziz Al Saud
- Mother: Fatima bint Hashim bin Turki
- Education: King Saud University

Abdullah bin Mosaad bin Abdul Aziz Al Saud (Arabic: عبد الله بن مساعد بن عبد العزيز آل سعود; born 19 February 1965) is the son of Prince Mosaad bin Abdulaziz Al Saud and grandson of King Abdulaziz. He was general president of Saudi Arabia's General Sports Authority from 2014 to 2017.

He is the founder of United World Group, which holds entities such as Beerschot, Al-Hilal United, Châteauroux and Kerala United. He held a 50% stake in Sheffield United between 2013 and 2019 and later became its sole owner until 2024, when the club was purchased by COH Sports.

== Education ==
He has bachelors and masters degrees in Industrial Engineering from King Saud University.

== Business activities ==
In 1989, Prince Abdullah founded a paper-manufacturing company in Saudi Arabia, the SPMC Group. Prince Abdullah sold his interest in the company in 2016.

Prince Abdullah was the chairman of the leading Saudi Arabian football club Al-Hilal for 18 months between 2002 and 2004 during which time the club won the Crown Prince Cup. During his brother's chairmanship of Al-Hilal, Prince Abdullah supervised the club's investments. He remains a supporter of the club.

In September 2013, Prince Abdullah purchased a 50 percent stake in English then-EFL League One club Sheffield United and became co-chairman with Kevin McCabe. In February 2018, Prince Abdullah entered into negotiations with McCabe to take full control of Sheffield United. In September 2019, Prince Abdullah owned 100% of the club including all club-related properties (stadium, academy, hotel, etc.) after winning a legal case against his partner as per the High Court decision in UK. In April 2021, Sheffield United announced that their chairman Prince Abdullah had resigned from his position for personal reasons.

In mid-2018, Prince Abdullah controlled 50% of the Belgian football club KFCO Beerschot Wilrijk in the southern part of the city of Antwerp, and in January 2020 he increased his share in this club to 75%. Two years after Prince Abdullah took over, Beerschot went on to win the league final in August 2020. The club was promoted to the Belgian First Division for the first time. The club changed its name to Beerschot V Antwerp, in commemoration of the dissolved football club K. Beerschot V.A.C. The club also acquired the historic registration number "13" that had belonged to the latter club. Around February 2020, it was announced that Prince Abdullah took ownership of the newly established Al Hilal United in Dubai, UAE. In October 2020, Prince Abdullah became the owner of the newly formed Kerala United of I-League 2nd Division based in Kerala, India.

In March 2021, it was announced that he has ownership of La Berrichonne de Châteauroux, the National division based in Châteauroux, France.

== Career ==
In June 2014, Prince Abdullah was appointed General President of General Sports Authority in Saudi Arabia making him at the same time the head of the Saudi Arabian Olympic Committee, and the head of Islamic Solidarity Sports Federation. His tenure began on the 26 of June 2014 and ended on the 22 of April 2017 he and was succeeded by Mohammed Abdul Malik Al Al-Sheikh. The Authority later became a ministry.

== Private life ==
Prince Abdullah married Princess Jawaher bint Fahd bint Abdullah Al Saud. He has five daughters and two sons.

Preceded by Nawaf bin Faisal	President of the Islamic Solidarity Sports Federation; June 2014 – April 2017	Succeeded by Mohammed Abdulmalik Al Al Sheikh
