= Sultan bin Fahd Al Saud =

Saudi royal and government official (born 1951)

President of Youth Welfare
- In office: September 1999 – January 2011
- Predecessor: Faisal bin Fahd
- Successor: Nawaf bin Faisal
- Monarch: King Fahd; King Abdullah
- Born: 1951 (age 74–75); Taif, Saudi Arabia
- Spouse: Al Jawhara bint Faisal bin Turki Al Saud
Names
- Sultan bin Fahd bin Abdulaziz bin Abdul Rahman Al Saud
- House: Al Saud
- Father: King Fahd
- Mother: Alanoud bint Abdulaziz bin Musaed
- Education: Sandhurst Military Academy

Sultan bin Fahd Al Saud (Arabic: سلطان بن فهد آل سعود; born 1951) is a member of House of Saud, son of King Fahd, and grandson of Saudi's founder King Abdulaziz. A graduate of the Royal Military Academy Sandhurst, Prince Sultan is the former president (1999-2011) of Youth Welfare agency.

== Early life and education ==
Prince Sultan was born in Taif in 1951. He is the son of King Fahd. His mother, Alanoud bint Abdulaziz bin Musaed, was from the Jiluwi branch of the Al Saud whose members intermarried with the Al Saud. Alanoud bint Abdulaziz was younger sister of Moneera, who was the spouse of Prince Sultan, and she was also cousin of King Khalid and Prince Muhammed. She died of kidney failure in Santa Barbara in March 1999 after a long period of treatment in Los Angeles at the age of 76.

Prince Sultan's full-brothers are Faisal bin Fahd, Mohammad bin Fahd, Saud bin Fahd, Khaled bin Fahd, and his full-sister is Latifa bint Fahd. He attended Sandhurst Military Academy and thus, after finishing his training at Sandhurst, Sultan was commissioned into the Saudi Army.

== Career ==
Prince Sultan joined the tank corps of the Saudi Arabian armed forces as a lieutenant at Tabuk Province after his graduation. In 1991, he was appointed deputy president of youth welfare. He was named as the president of the body on 1 September 1999 following the death of his brother Faisal bin Fahd. Prince Sultan resigned from office in January 2011. His nephew, Nawaf bin Faisal, replaced him as the head of youth welfare. Prince Sultan was the chairman of Saudi Arabian olympic committee.

Prince Sultan has several business activities. He has shares in various companies, including Falcom and Tok Al Khaleej Investment. He is a board member of Al Anoud Foundation.

== Personal life ==
Sultan bin Fahd is married to Al Jawhara bint Faisal bin Turki Al Saud, a daughter of his full aunt, Luluwah bint Abdulaziz. They have two daughters, Nouf and Sara.

Preceded by Faisal bin Fahd	President of the Islamic Solidarity Sports Federation; 7 February 2000 – 3 October 2011	Succeeded by Nawaf bin Faisal
