= Ghanima al-Harb =

Kuwaiti poet

- غنيمة زيد الحرب
- Born: 1949; Kuwait
- Alma mater: Kuwait University
- Occupation: Poet, social worker
- Parent(s): Zaid Al-Harb

Ghanima Zayd 'Abd Allah al-Harb (born 1949) is a Kuwaiti poet and social worker.

Ghanima al-Harb was born in 1949 in Kuwait, the daughter of the popular Kuwaiti poet Zaid al-Harb. She graduated with a B.A. in psychology and sociology from Kuwait University in 1974 and worked as a social worker. She published poetry in both classical and contemporary Arabic, and some of her poetry was set to music using the pseudonym Fatat al-Khalij ("Young Woman of the Gulf"). English translations of her poems "Escaping from the Coma Cage" and "The Sparkle" were included in the anthology Gathering the tide : an anthology of contemporary Arabian Gulf poetry (2011).

== Bibliography ==
- Qasa'id qafas al-ihtilal (Poems on the Cage of the Occupation, poetry). Kuwait: al-Khatt Press, 1991.
- Hadil al-hamam (The Dove's Coo, poetry). Kuwait: al-Khatt Press, 1993.
- Ajnihat al-rimal (Wings of the Sands, poetry). Kuwait: al-Khatt Press, 1993.
- Fi khaymat al-halak (In the Tent of the Pitch Black, poetry). Kuwait: al-Khatt Press, n.d.
