= Janan Harb =

Widow of King Fahd (born 1947)

- Born: 1947 (age 78–79); Ramallah, Mandatory Palestine
- Known for: Former wife of King Fahd

Janan George Harb (Arabic: جنان حرب; born 1947) is a former wife of King Fahd of Saudi Arabia.

== Biography ==
Janan Harb was born in Ramallah, Mandatory Palestine, in 1947 to a Christian Arab family. She met Prince Fahd at a party in Jeddah in December 1967. They married in a secret ceremony in Jeddah in March 1968, and she had converted to Islam just before the marriage. They lived in Jeddah and London during their marriage. She introduced some of her friends to Prince Fahd who was the interior minister during that period to enable them to get jobs or visas.

She says that she was forced by senior royals including then Prince Salman and Prince Turki, full brothers of Prince Fahd, to leave Saudi Arabia in 1970. They thought that she was responsible for the addiction of Prince Fahd to methadone which he had begun to use following chronic stomach pains in 1969. She rejects any role in the addiction of her ex-husband. Harb left Saudi Arabia and first went to Beirut and to the US. In 1974 she married a Lebanese lawyer with whom she has two daughters.

To the embarrassment to the Saudi royal family, she launched a £400m maintenance claim against King Fahd in 2004, a year before Fahd's death. In 2016 she lost the case.

== Book ==
Janan Harb published a book entitled The Saudi King and I in which her relationship with Fahd is detailed. The story has been sold for making a film which is provisionally titled The Sins of King Fahd, and a three-minute teaser of the film was posted to YouTube.
