= Mehdi Harb =

Tunisian footballer

Personal information
- Date of birth: August 23, 1979 (age 47)
- Place of birth: Ariana, Tunisia
- Height: 1.78 m (5 ft 10 in)
- Position: Forward

Senior career*
Years	Team	Apps	(Gls)
2007–2008	AS Ariana		
2008–2010	Olympique Béja		(9)
2010–2013	Al Fahaheel		
2013–2016	Al Yarmouk		
2016–2017	Al Sahel		
- * Club domestic league appearances and goals

Mehdi Harb (Arabic: مهدي حرب) (born August 23, 1979) is a Tunisian former footballer who played as a forward.
