= Prince Mohammad bin Fahd University =

University in Saudi Arabia

- جامعة الأمير محمد بن فهد
- Motto: Creative Minds, Transform The World
- Type: Private
- Established: September 2006; 19 years ago
- President: Issa Al- Ansari
- Location: Al-Khobar, Eastern Province, Saudi Arabia
- Website: www.pmu.edu.sa
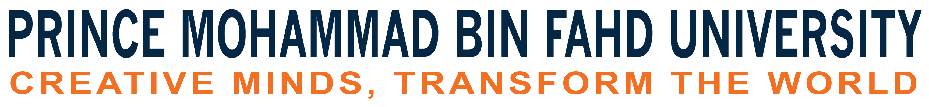

Prince Mohammad bin Fahd University (Arabic: جامعة الأمير محمد بن فهد ), abbreviated PMU, is a private non-profit university in Al-Khobar, Saudi Arabia. It was founded by Prince Mohammad bin Fahd, former governor of the Eastern Province.

The university is accredited by the Saudi Ministry of Education and regionally by NCAAA (The National Commission for Academic Accreditation and Assessment) with responsibility for determining standards and procedures for accreditation and quality assurance and accrediting postsecondary institutions and programs within the Kingdom of Saudi Arabia. The commission is an independent authority, responsible to the Higher Council of Education. The commission's objectives, as specified in its bylaws, include a wide range of functions associated with support for improvements of the quality of postsecondary education in all fields of learning other than defense. Internationally, the university is seeking accreditation from various accreditation bodies. Currently, the Engineering programs are accredited by ABET (formerly known as Accreditation Board for Engineering and Technology). The program of Law is accredited by the French accreditation body HCERES.

== Rankings ==
In 2020, PMU ranked among the top 1000 universities worldwide, according to QS World University Rankings (750-800). PMU also ranked 44 in the QS Arab University Rankings and was listed among the Top 50 under 50 QS

University rankings

Global – Overall
- QS World: =436 (2026)

Rankings, seventh among the Saudi Universities according to QS and third in Saudi Arabia, and 101–200 in the world according to the Times Higher Education Impact Rankings in 2021.

== Colleges/centers ==
The university was inaugurated in April 2006 with bachelor's degrees in 17 academic programs. The medium of instruction is English. It is composed of six colleges: College of Engineering - civil, mechanical, and electrical engineering, College of Architecture and Design: interior design, graphic design, and architecture; College of Business, accounting, finance, business administration, human resources, management information systems; College of Computer Engineering and Science: computer engineering, software engineering, computer science, and information technology; College of Human Studies and Sciences; College of Law.

== See also ==
- List of universities and colleges in Saudi Arabia
