= Hamad Kalkaba Malboum =

Cameroonian athletics official (1950–2026)

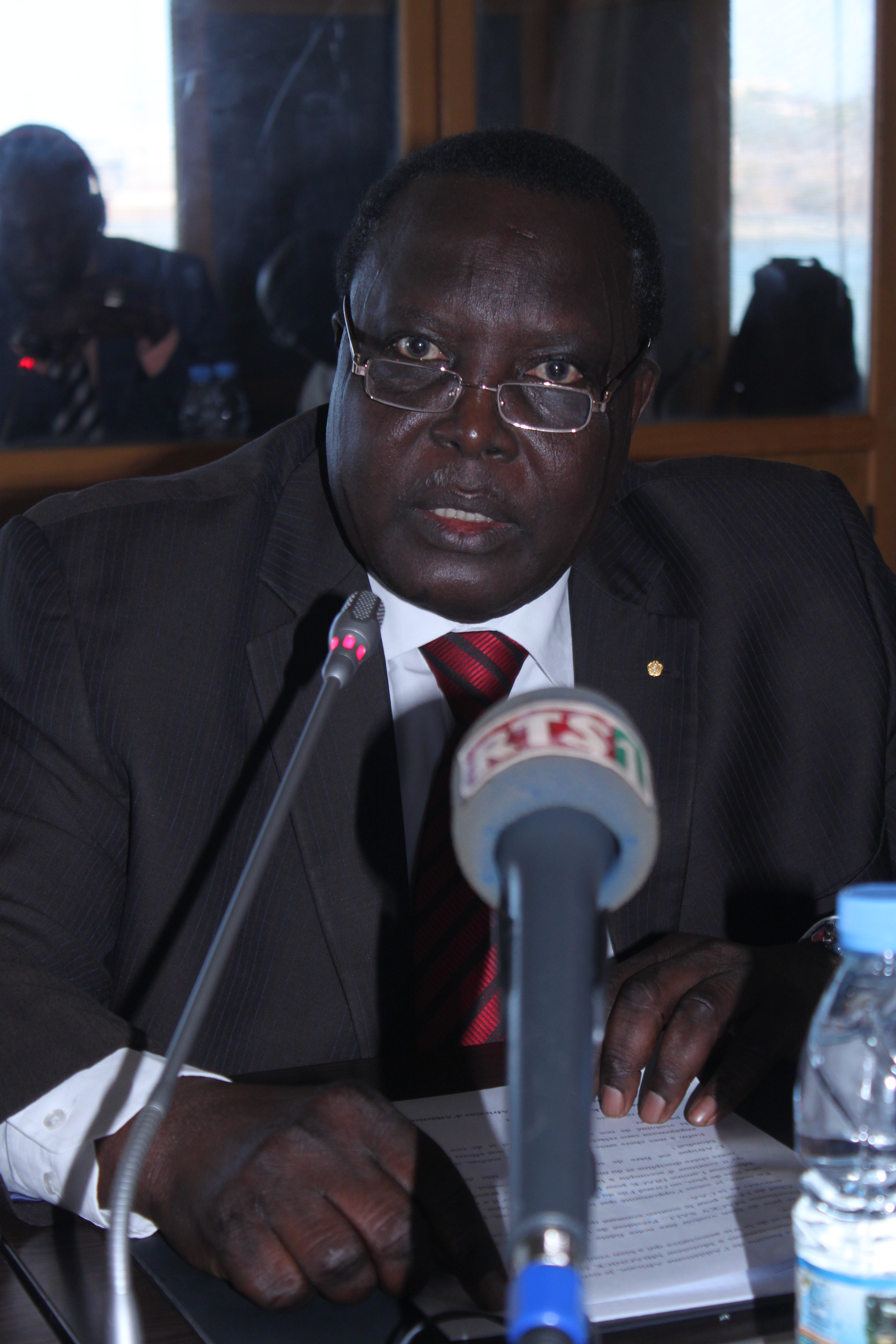
Malboum in 2014

Hamad Kalkaba Malboum (11 November 1950 – 13 May 2026) was a Cameroonian athletics official, who was the President of the Confederation of African Athletics (CAA). He took over the role in 2003, when he replaced Lamine Diack who became President of the International Association of Athletics Federation (IAAF). Malboum remained in office until his death in 2026.

== Background ==
Malboum was born in Kawadji near Kousseri, a town in Cameroon bordering the Republic of Chad. He started his primary education in Kousseri. After four years in Maroua, he graduated and started high school in Garoua. He was drafted to join the army in 1969. In 1972, he graduated from the military school in Yaoundé in 1972 and became an officer. He attended police school from 1972 to 1973, and officer's school from 1987 to 1988. Throughout his education he was interested in sports and music (German label Analog Africa has released a compilation of his songs called "Hamad Kalkaba and The Golden Sounds 1974-1975"), and played handball and athletics. He finished his army service as a senior army officer, but remained involved in the armed forces as a sports official.

Malboum died on 12 May 2026, at the age of 75.

== Sports career ==
From 1970 to 1974 he was a member of Cameroon's 4 × 100 metres relay team and also competed in the 100 metres, 200 metres and long jump. He was highly influential in developing national sports federations in Cameroon, founding the country's baseball and softball federations in 1992 and leading the handball and athletics bodies.

From 1976 to 1983 he was a member of the Board of Directors of the National Sports Office and headed the International Military Sports Council (CISM) from 2010 to 2014. He also served from 1996 as founder and organiser of the "Espoir" Race (ascension of Mont Cameroon). From 2001 he has been head of the National Olympic and Sports Committee (CNOSC) and from 2003, head of the Confederation of African Athletics (CAA).

Following the exit of Senegal's Lamine Diack as IAAF president, Malboum became the most influential athletic administrator in Africa. Though Africa did not present a candidate to replace Diack, the continent remained an important element to the sport's governance given the success of its athletes.
