= Latifah Bee Ghows =

Malaysian physician

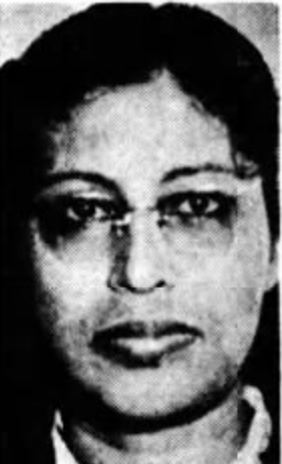
- Latifah Ghows, from a 1952 Australian newspaper
- Born: 1911; Taiping, Perak, Malaya
- Died: 11 October 2005 (age 94); Taiping, Perak, Malaysia
- Occupation: Physician

Latifah Bee Ghows (1911 – 11 October 2005) was a Malaysian physician. She was among the first Muslim Malayan women doctors when she received her medical degree in 1942. She practiced in Kuala Lumpur, Malacca, Penang, and Taiping.

== Early life and education ==
Ghows was born in Taiping, Perak, the daughter of Ismail Mohamad Ghows and Zohara Bee; her maternal grandfather was Shaik Nannameah Sahib. Her father was a physician. She attended the Treacher Methodist Girls' School in her hometown, and King Edward VII Medical College in Singapore. During World War II, she was in Hong Kong and India, and earned her medical degree from the University of Hong Kong in 1942. Because it was wartime, she received a special temporary certificate. She pursued further medical training in England and Australia, and received specialized training in midwifery in Dublin.

== Career ==
Ghows worked at the Hong Kong Civil Hospital from 1942 to 1945. After the war, she worked in India. From 1949 to 1952, she was among the first Muslim women to practice medicine in Malaya, when she was a medical officer at the Kuala Lumpur General Hospital. She worked at Malacca General Hospital and was senior medical officer of the Penang Municipal Council. She retired in 1966.

== Personal life ==
Latifah Bee Ghows died in 2005, at the age of 94, in Taiping. Her grave is in the cemetery at the Taiping Old Mosque.

== See also ==
- Salma Ismail (1918–2014), another early Malaysian woman doctor
- Siti Hasmah (born 1926), another early Malaysian woman doctor
