= Nabil Abou-Harb =

American film director

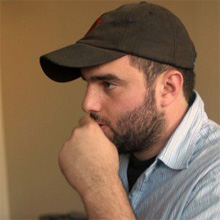
- (on the set of "Arab in America", 2006)
- Born: Nabil Zouheir Abou-Harb; September 13, 1984 (age 42); Marietta, Georgia, United States
- Occupations: filmmaker and writer
- Years active: 2006–present

Nabil Zouheir Abou-Harb (Arabic: نبيل أبو حرب; born September 13, 1984) is an American filmmaker, writer, producer, and director. He is also co-founder of "Five on Fifty Films" and has directed and produced a number of commercials.

== Early life and education ==
Abou-Harb was born in Marietta, Georgia, United States, to Zouheir Abou-Harb and Sally Cardinali Abou-Harb in 1984. Nabil was raised as a Muslim in Loganville, Georgia. He graduated from Loganville High School in 2003.

As a senior at Loganville High School, Abou-Harb wrote and directed the film Starwars: Rise of the Black Sun. After earning his CCNA, he co-founded a web design company with Nicholas Bowman, called Decaphase Productions, Inc. Although there was interest to see the film, Abou-Harb and Bowman abandoned the project as they went to college.

Bowman attended Georgia Institute of Technology, where he earned his bachelor's degree, whereas Abou-Harb was awarded a portfolio scholarship from the Savannah College of Art and Design for his Star Wars fanfilm trailer. He graduated in 2007, earning his bachelor's degree in film/television. A short, two-minute trailer from "Star Wars: Rise of the Black Sun" debuted on Loganville High School's student-run news "WDVL" program. The trailer was also posted online.

== Arab in America ==
As his senior year approached, Abou-Harb co-wrote a fifteen-page comedy screenplay titled, Arab in America. The film chronicles the journey of an American-born character named, "Osama Ahmed Abou-Bakr" and his plight to find a job in America's post-9/11 atmosphere. The story highlights the hardships of Middle Easterners and Muslims living in the United States. The character, "Osama", a recent college graduate, cannot get anyone to hire him so he resorts to a drastic measure: he changes his name from "Osama Ahmed Abou-Bakr" to the more appealing "Samuel Adam Baker". Instantly, he's offered a high-paying job at a prestigious company. However, concealing his true identity turns into a daunting task that unfortunately "Sam" cannot keep up and eventually comes clean. The script is loosely based on real-life events that continue to plague Abou-Harb's cousin, Nidal Abou-Harb, his father, Zouheir Abou-Harb, his brother, Osama Abou-Harb, and himself.

The subject matter and humorous tone of the screenplay (co-written with Colin Ferri) attracted many students and faculty members to dedicate their expertise and time to help the ambitious project get off its feet. This also encouraged Nabil to get in touch with Nic Applegate, a Savannah, GA investor, architect, building contractor and band-manager, who agreed to fully fund the project. Applegate eventually became an equal partner in Nabil and Colin's production company, "Five on Fifty Films".

The "Arab in America" short was shot over twelve days in Savannah, Georgia and Atlanta, Georgia with Nabil Abou-Harb directing and co-producing the film. It debuted at the 2007 Cannes Film Festival followed by the United States premiere at the "Arabian Sights Film Festival" sponsored by The Washington D.C. International Film Festival where "Arab in America" won the Audience Award for Best Short Film.

=== Arab in America: The feature ===
Many talent agencies and production companies have shown interest in a feature version of the short "Arab in America".

Nabil Abou-Harb, co-writer Thomas Verrette, co-writer Colin Ferri, and Nic Applegate are currently in pre-production of the feature film version of "Arab in America". "Five on Fifty Films" has decided however to shoot the movie independently.

The feature screenplay was recently completed and Five on Fifty Films is in negotiations to produce the feature.

== Awards and recognition ==
Abou-Harb's Arab in America won the audience award for "Best Short Film" at the Arabian Sights Film Festival. The festival is sponsored by The Washington D.C. International Film Festival. It also won the Grand Prize of 2008 One Nation Many Voices Online Film Contest.
