= Zaid Al-Harb =

- Born: 1887
- Died: 21 February 1972 (aged 84–85)
- Occupation: Poet
- Children: Ghanima al-Harb

Zaid Abdullah Al-Harb (Arabic: زيد عبدالله الحرب) (1887 – February 21, 1972) was a Kuwaiti poet.

== Biography ==
Al-Harb was born in Kuwait in 1887 in the Sharq area (Arabic: منطقة شرق). He grew up in his grandfather's house, and he worked with his uncles as a sailor then as a Nokhitha (Arabic: نوخذة). Al-Harb worked in trade and traveled to India, Yemen and the East coast of Africa. He participated in the battle of Al-Jahra (Arabic: معركة الجهراء) in 1920, defending Kuwait. In 1952, Zaid lost his eyesight.

== His works ==
He discussed the social and political life in Kuwait and the Arab world. In his poems he had described the struggle and the tough life of Kuwaiti divers who were diving for pearls as the main source of their income before producing the oil in Kuwait.

و القيض كله نجالب الغوص بحبال *** ماي جما الزرنيخ و زاده نهيبه
و الغيص يشكي الضيم من بحر الاهوال *** و السيب واقف دوم مثل النصيبه
و يركض على المجداف لي صاح (يا مال) *** و نوم الملا بالليل ما نهتني به
و رحنا السفر و الموج يا جنه جبال *** في غبة فيها المنايا قريبة
لا حولنا ديرة و لا حولنا يال *** و لا من ذرا بالضيق نبنلتجي به
إلا سواد الليل من دونهم حال *** و بحر كسيف دوم تطبخ غبيبة

All the summer we struggle diving with ropes ** The water is like hell
The diver is complaining about the terrifying sea ** And the rope man is always standing like a wall
And he runs to the oar as he yell (Ya mal) ** And we don't know how is the sleep at night
We went to travel, and the billows are like mountains ** In the darkness the death is very close
No country around us, neither a coast ** And no one we could run to
Except the darkness of night that falls on them ** And an unknown dark sea
