= Lateefah Durosinmi =

Nigerian academic

- Born: July 7, 1957; Lagos
- Spouse: Muheez Durosinmi
- Scientific career
- Fields: Inorganic Chemistry
- Institutions: Obafemi Awolowo University

Lateefah Durosinmi (born 1957 in Lagos) is a Nigerian chemist and academic. She is a Professor at Obafemi Awolowo University in Ilé-Ifẹ̀, Nigeria.

== Early life ==
Lateefah Moyosore-Oluwa Adunni Durosinmi was born on 7 July 1957, on Lagos Island in Nigeria. Her father Late Alhaji Tijani Akanni Kolawole Williams was a sales manager and her mother was Madam Wusamot Abeni Kareem. Durosinmi was educated at the Patience Modern Girls’ (Private) School in Olowogbowo and then boarded at the Girls’ Secondary Grammar School in Gbagada. She married Muheez Durosinmi on 9 May 1981.

Durosinmi attended the University of Ibadan and gained a BSc (Hons) in Chemistry in 1979. She then studied for a Master of Science in Analytical Chemistry, graduating in 1986. She took a PhD in Inorganic Chemistry at the Obafemi Awolowo University in Ilé-Ifẹ̀, in 1992. Her study focus was amino acids.

== Career ==
Durosinmi began her career with the Lagos Water Corporation, then taught chemistry at Saint Anne’s School in Ibadan. In 1989, she took an appointment at the Obafemi Awolowo University in the chemistry department, where she is presently a Professor of Inorganic Chemistry. Between 2008 and 2016 she was also Acting Dean of Students. She visited Loughborough University as a postdoctoral research fellow from 1994 until 1995.

Between 2005 and 2009, she was President of the Federation of Muslim Women’s Associations in Nigeria (FOMWAN). Afterwards, a number of lectures and essays were released in her honour.

== Foundation ==
Durosinmi set up the Lateefah Moyosore Durosinmi Foundation (LMDF) in 2013, with the aim of supporting financially disadvantaged students and women setting up businesses. In 2019, she awarded scholarships to 33 students and grants to 15 women at a ceremony in Ibadan. She commented that "we must assist women to develop the society and as well as the youths to develop their talent". In 2019, Professor Ashiata Bolatito Lanre-Abbas, who was the first female Muslim Professor at the University of Ibadan, gave the sixth Lateefah Moyosore Durosinmi Foundation lecture concerning economic recession at Obafemi Awolowo University.

== Selected works ==
- Adebiyi, F.M.; Abiona, I.K.; Durosinmi, L.M.; Thoss, V.; Santoro, A. (7 July 2017). "Radioassay of Elements, Organics and Radioactivity Level of Maltene Component of Nigerian Crude Oil for Human and Ecological Assessment". Journal of Sustainable Energy Engineering. 5 (2): 125–147. doi:10.7569/jsee.2017.629509. ISSN 2164-6287.
