= Fahd of Saudi Arabia =

King of Saudi Arabia from 1982 to 2005

Fahd
- Custodian of the Two Holy Mosques
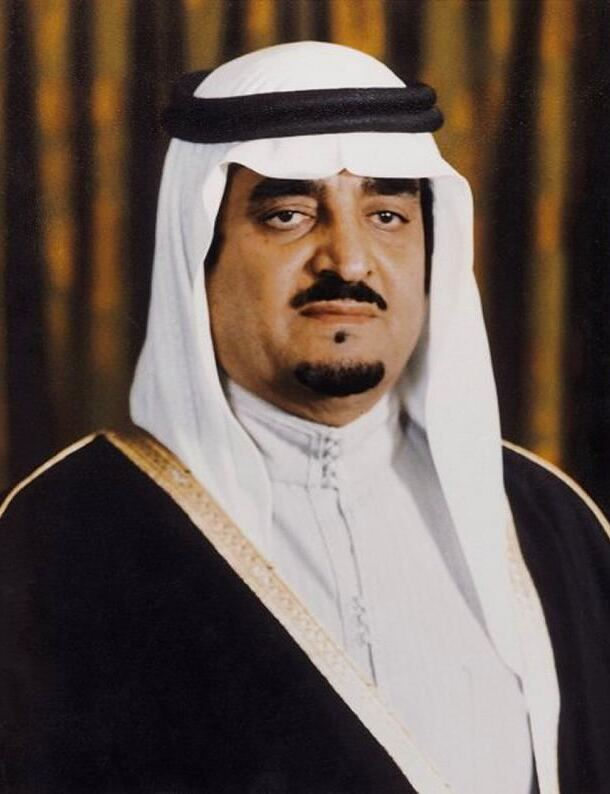
- Official portrait, 1982

King and Prime Minister of Saudi Arabia
- Reign: 13 June 1982 – 1 August 2005
- Bay'ah: 13 June 1982
- Predecessor: Khalid
- Successor: Abdullah
- Regent: Crown Prince Abdullah (1996‍–‍2005)

Minister of Interior
- Tenure: 1962–1975
- Predecessor: Faisal bin Turki I
- Successor: Nayef bin Abdulaziz
- Prime Minister: King Saud; King Faisal

Minister of Education
- Tenure: 1953–1962
- Predecessor: Office established
- Successor: Abdullah bin Saleh bin Obaid
- Prime Minister: King Saud

Chairman of the Majlis ash-Shura
- Tenure: 13 June 1982–August 1993
- Predecessor: Khalid bin Abdulaziz Al Saud
- Successor: Mohammed bin Ibrahim bin Jubair
- Born: 1920, 1921 or 1923; Riyadh, Sultanate of Nejd
- Died: 1 August 2005 (aged 81–85); Riyadh, Saudi Arabia
- Burial: 2 August 2005; Al Oud cemetery
- Spouse: See list
- Issue: 10, including: Prince Faisal; Prince Muhammad; Prince Saud; Prince Sultan; Prince Abdulaziz; Princess Latifa
Names
- Fahd bin Abdulaziz bin Abdul Rahman
- House: Al Saud
- Father: Abdulaziz of Saudi Arabia
- Mother: Hassa bint Ahmed Al Sudairi

Fahd bin Abdulaziz Al Saud (Note: Arabic: فهد بن عبد العزيز آل سعود) (1920, 1921 or 1923 – 1 August 2005) was King and Prime Minister of Saudi Arabia from 13 June 1982 until his death in 2005. Prior to his ascension, he was Crown Prince of Saudi Arabia from 1975 to 1982.

Fahd was the eldest of the Sudairi Seven, the sons of King Abdulaziz by Hassa bint Ahmed Al Sudairi. He served as Minister of Education from 1953 to 1962 during the reign of King Saud. Afterwards he was Interior Minister from 1962 to 1975, at the end of King Saud's reign and throughout King Faisal's reign. He was appointed crown prince when his half-brother Khalid became king following the assassination of King Faisal in 1975. Fahd was viewed as the de facto leader of the country during King Khalid's reign in part due to the latter's ill health.

Upon the death of King Khalid in 1982, Fahd ascended to the throne. He is credited for having introduced the Basic Law of Saudi Arabia in 1992. He suffered a debilitating stroke in 1995, after which he was unable to continue performing his full official duties. His half-brother Crown Prince Abdullah served as de facto regent of the kingdom and succeeded Fahd as king upon his death in 2005. With a reign of 23 years, Fahd remains the longest-reigning Saudi king.

== Early life and education ==
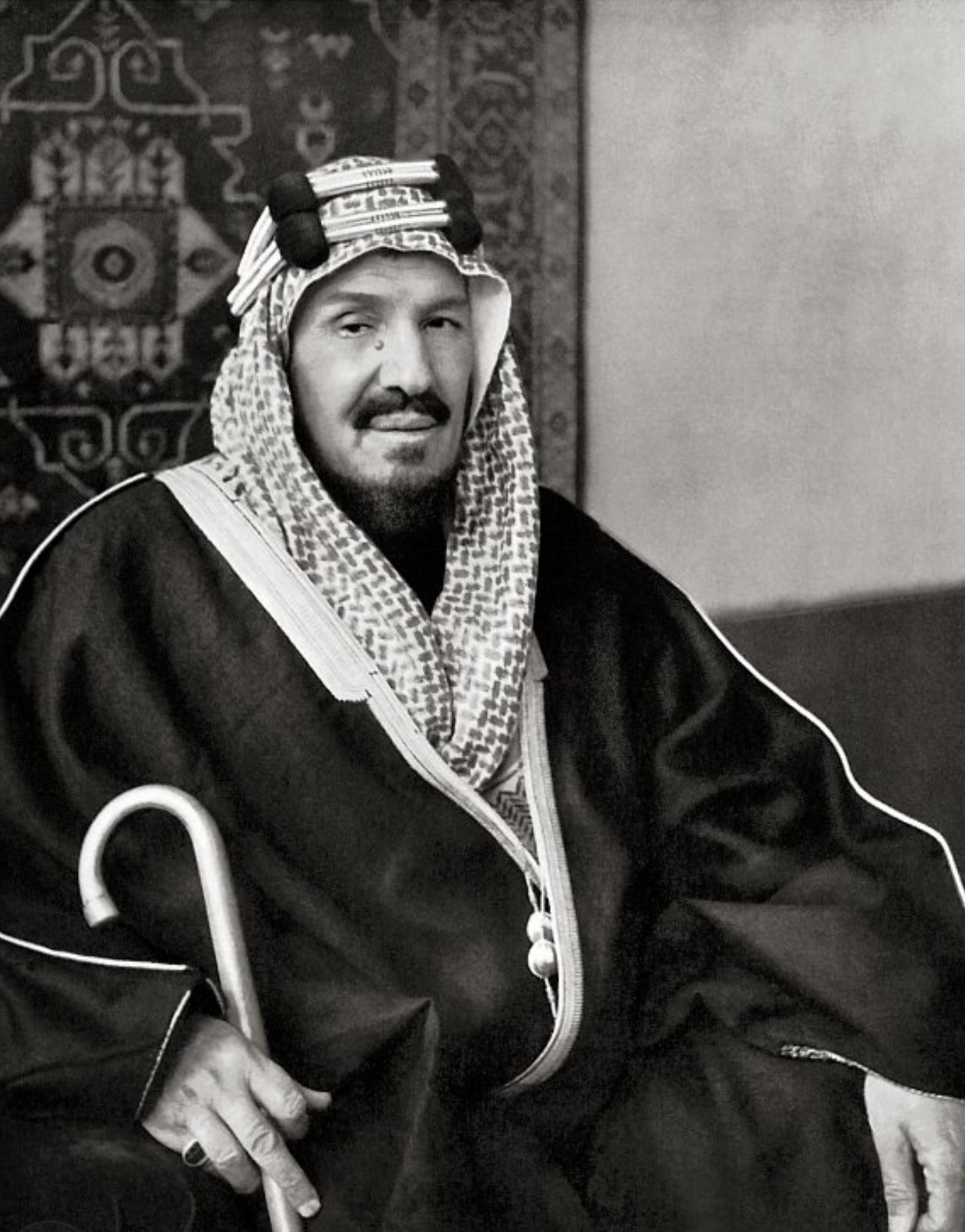
King Abdulaziz, father of Fahd

Fahd bin Abdulaziz was born in the walled town of Riyadh in 1920, 1921 or 1923. He was the eldest son of King Abdulaziz by Hassa bint Ahmed Al Sudairi. Fahd and his six full brothers are known as the Sudairi Seven. Fahd was Hassa's second son; his elder half-brother Abdullah bin Muhammad was his mother's only son from her previous marriage to Prince Muhammad bin Abdul Rahman, Fahd's paternal uncle.

Fahd's education took place at the Princes' School in Riyadh, a school established by King Abdulaziz specifically for the education of members of the House of Saud. He received education for four years as a result of his mother's urging. While at the Princes' School, Fahd studied under tutors including Sheikh Abdul Ghani Khayat. He then went on to receive education at the Religious Knowledge Institute in Mecca.

== Early political roles ==
Prince Fahd was made a member of the royal advisory board at his mother's urging. In 1945, he traveled on his first state visit to San Francisco for the signing of the Charter of the United Nations. On this trip, he served under Prince Faisal who was at the time Saudi Arabia's foreign minister. Fahd led his first official state visit in 1953, attending the coronation of Queen Elizabeth II on behalf of the House of Saud. On 24 December 1953, he was appointed as Saudi Arabia's first education minister.

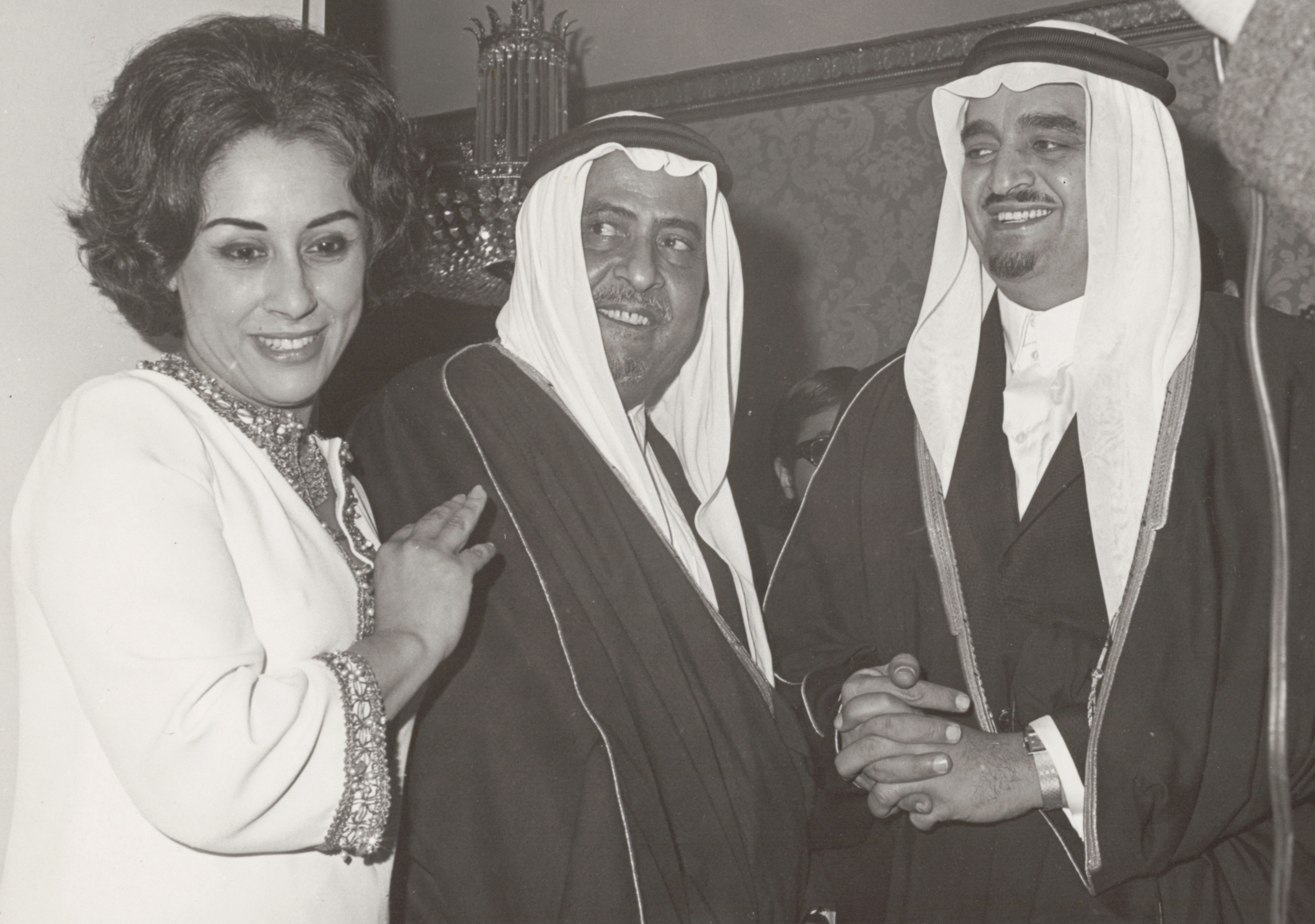
Interior Minister Fahd bin Abdulaziz Al Saud with Ibrahim bin Abdullah Al Suwaiyel, Saudi Ambassador to the United States

Prince Fahd led the Saudi delegation to the League of Arab States in 1959, signifying his increasing prominence in the House of Saud and his being groomed for a more significant role. In 1962, he was given the important post of interior minister. As interior minister, he headed the Saudi delegation at a meeting of Arab Heads of State in Egypt in 1965. At the beginning of King Faisal's reign, Prince Fahd became a member of the council which had been established by the king to guide the succession issues.

On 2 January 1967, Prince Fahd survived an assassination attempt when an explosion occurred in his private office at the ministry. He was not there during the incident, but the explosion injured nearly 40 staff of the ministry.

Prince Fahd was named second deputy prime minister in 1967 when King Faisal established the office. The post was created upon the request of Crown Prince Khalid due to the fact that he himself did not want to continue to preside over the council of ministers. King Faisal was not very enthusiastic about the appointment of Prince Fahd to the post. Between October 1969 and May 1970, Prince Fahd was on leave which was regarded by Nadav Safran as an indication of major confrontation in the government. One of the reasons for this confrontation was the disagreement between King Faisal and Prince Fahd concerning security policies. King Faisal accused him of being late to implement severe measures to arrest those who had contacts with the Popular Front for the Liberation of Palestine (PFLP). The PFLP attacked and damaged the Saudi-owned Trans-Arabian Pipeline in the Golan Heights on 31 May 1969 and also was planning a plot against the King. During his absence which was reported by the officials as a medical leave, Prince Fahd stayed in London and then in Spain where he spent the time on gambling and leisure. King Faisal sent him both Omar Al Saqqaf, his envoy, and several letters asking him to return to the country, but Prince Fahd did not follow his request.

Prince Fahd was made the head of the Supreme Council on Petroleum in March 1973 when it was established by King Faisal. However, the relations between King Faisal and Prince Fahd were still strained due to Prince Fahd's gambling visits to Monte Carlo, Monaco. In addition, Prince Fahd was not a supporter of the oil embargo which he regarded as a potential threat to the relationships between Saudi Arabia and the United States of America. Because of these and other disagreements, King Faisal had planned to remove Prince Fahd from the post of second deputy prime minister which was not materialized by the king.

== Crown Prince ==
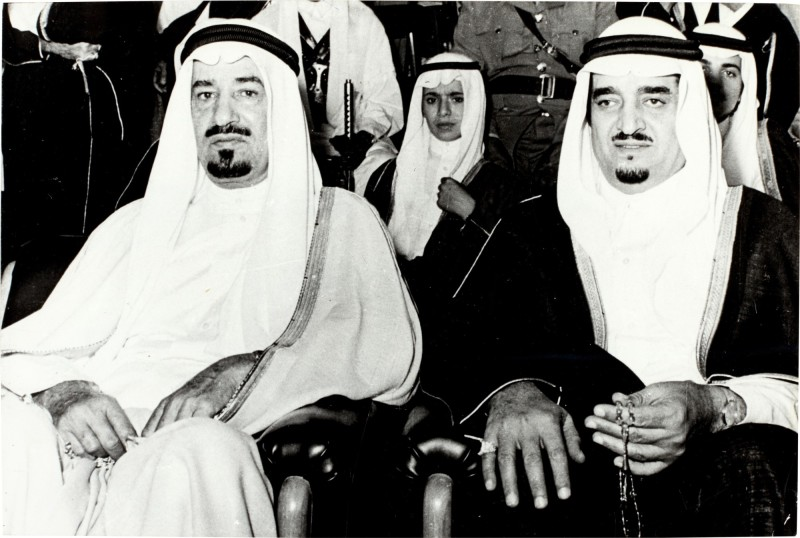
Crown Prince Fahd and King Khalid at a ceremony

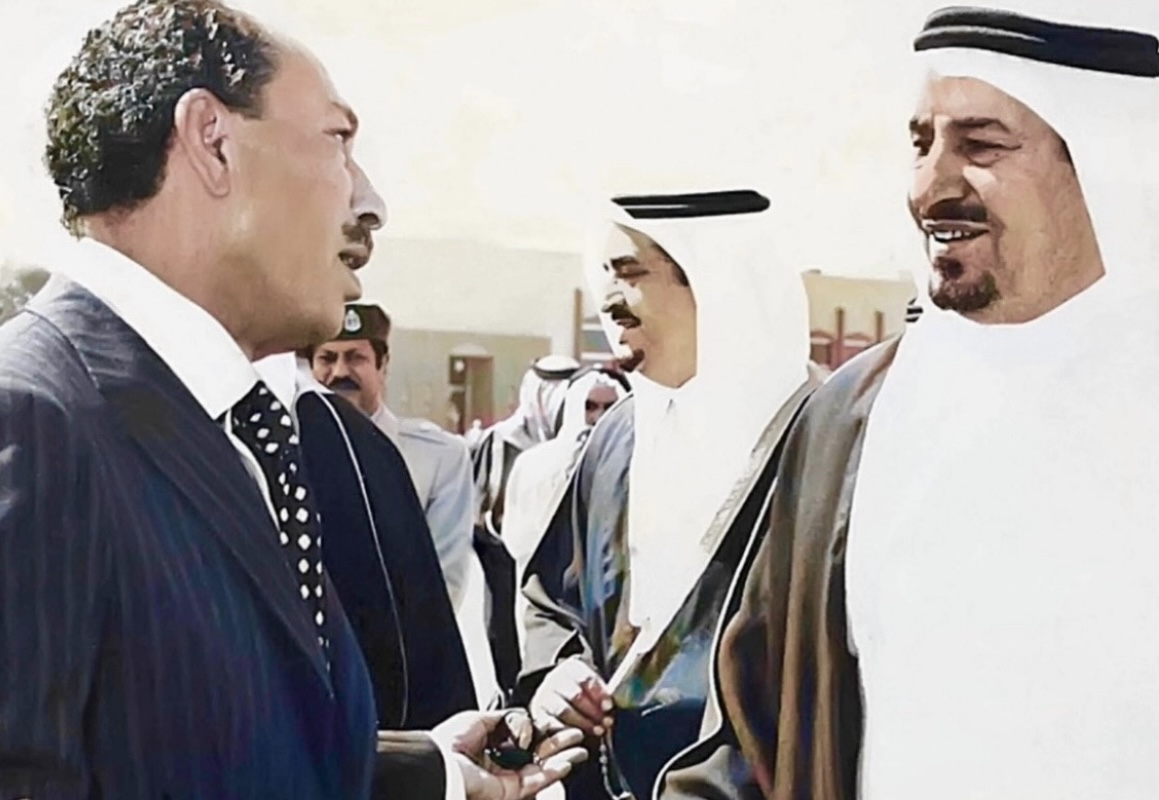
Egyptian President Anwar Sadat receives King Khalid and Crown Prince Fahd, Cairo, in July 1975

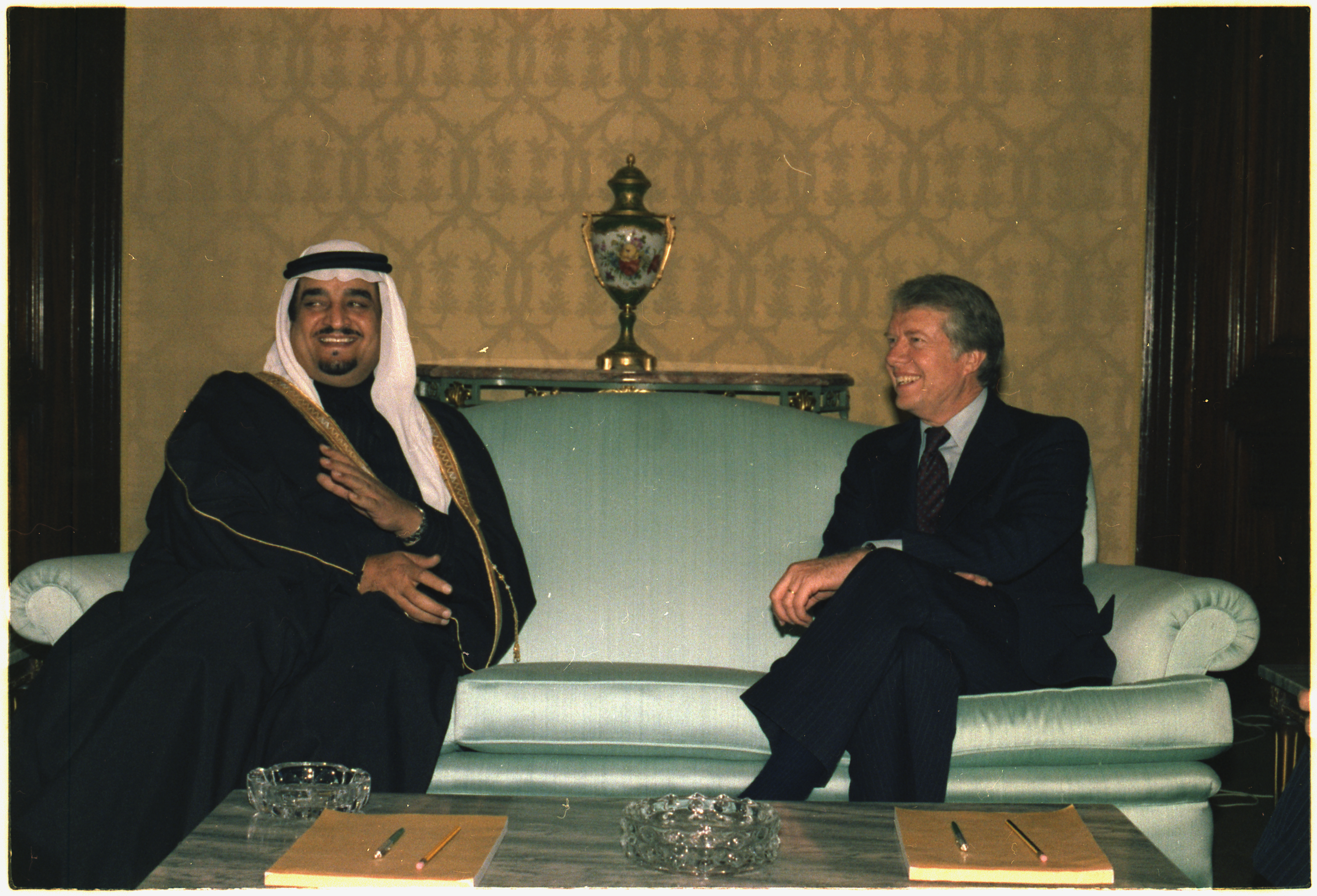
U.S. President Jimmy Carter and Crown Prince Fahd in 1978

After the murder of King Faisal in 1975 and the accession of King Khalid, Fahd was named first deputy prime minister and concurrently crown prince. Besides King Khalid, Prince Fahd had three elder half-brothers living at that time: Muhammad, Nasser and Saad. However, Prince Muhammad had denied appointment by King Faisal as crown prince a decade prior, while Princes Nasser and Saad were both considered unsuitable candidates. By contrast, Prince Fahd had served as minister of education from 1954 to 1962 and minister of interior from 1962 to 1975.

The appointment of Prince Fahd as both crown prince and first deputy prime minister made him a much more powerful figure in contrast to the status of King Khalid when he had been crown prince during King Faisal's reign. However, King Khalid had an influence over Fahd's activities and limited his powers, probably due to Fahd's very clear pro-Western views and hostile approach against Iran and the Shia population of Saudi Arabia. During this period, Crown Prince Fahd was one of the members of the inner family council led by King Khalid, which included Fahd's brothers Muhammad, Abdullah, Sultan and Abdul Muhsin and his uncles Ahmed and Musaid.

== Reign ==
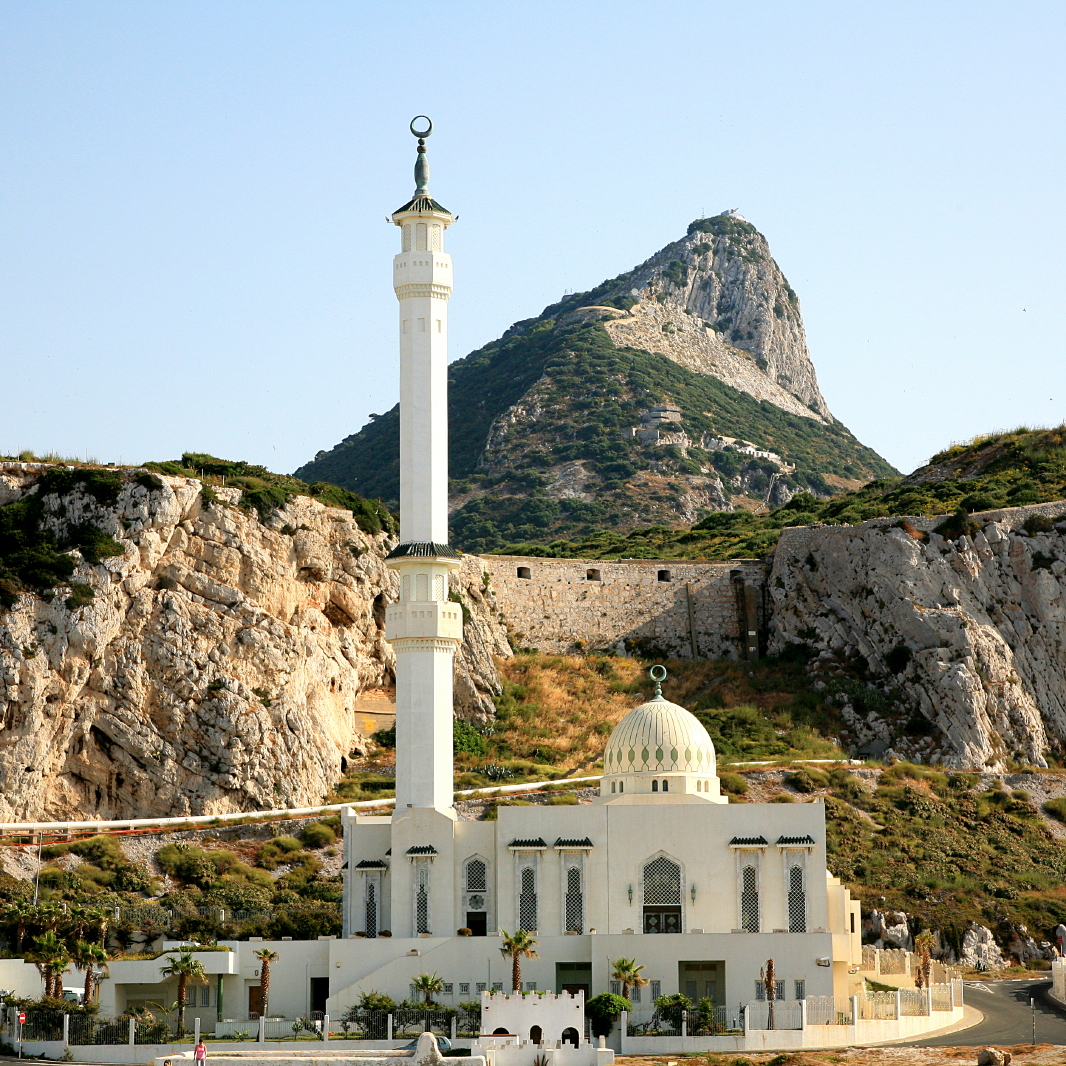
King Fahd gave money for building mosques throughout the world. The Ibrahim-al-Ibrahim Mosque, at Europa Point Gibraltar, which opened in 1997, is one such mosque.

When King Khalid died on 13 June 1982, Fahd succeeded to the throne being the fifth king of Saudi Arabia. However, the most active period of his life was not his reign, but when he was Crown Prince. King Fahd adopted the title "Custodian of the Two Holy Mosques" in 1986, replacing "His Majesty", to signify an Islamic rather than secular authority.

Unlike the reigns of King Faisal and King Khalid, his reign witnessed significant decrease in the oil price which sharply reduced the oil revenues of Saudi Arabia. Due to this, Madawi Al Rasheed described the reign of King Fahd as the era of austerity in contrast to the period of affluence experienced under his two predecessors.

=== Foreign policy ===
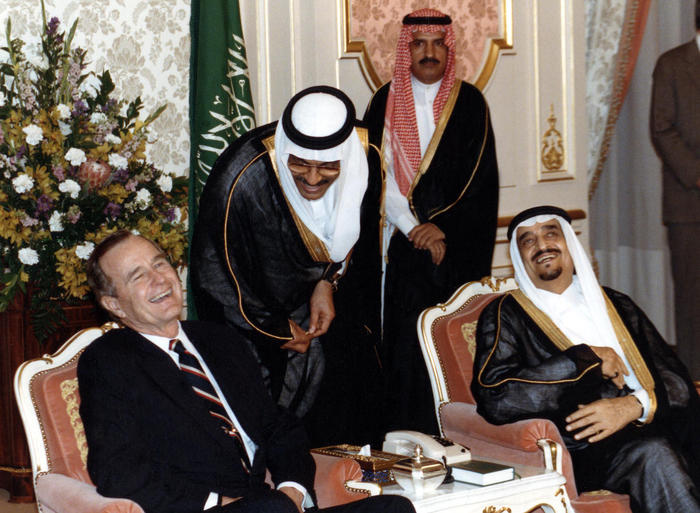
King Fahd shares a laugh with US President George H. W. Bush, Jeddah, 21 November 1990

Fearing that the 1979 Revolution in Iran could lead to similar Islamic upheaval in Saudi Arabia, Fahd spent considerable sums, after ascending the throne in 1982, to support Saddam Hussein's Baathist Iraq in its war with Iran. In fact, according to United States Secretary of State Alexander Haig, Fahd told Haig in April 1981 that he had been used as an intermediary by President Jimmy Carter to convey an official U.S. "green light to launch the war against Iran" to Iraq, although there is considerable skepticism about this claim.

Fahd was a supporter of the United Nations. He supported foreign aid and gave 5.5% of Saudi Arabia's national income through various funds, especially the Saudi Fund for Development and the OPEC Fund for International Development. He also gave aid to foreign groups such as the Bosnian Muslims in the Yugoslav Wars, as well as the Nicaraguan Contras, providing "a million dollars per month from May to December 1984". King Fahd was also a strong supporter of the Palestinian cause and an opponent of the State of Israel. Towards the beginning of Fahd's reign, he was a staunch ally of the United States. However, Fahd distanced himself from the US throughout parts of his reign, declining to allow the US to use Saudi air bases to protect naval convoys after the attack on the USS Stark, and in 1988 agreed to buy between fifty and sixty nuclear-payload-capable CSS-2 intermediate-range ballistic missiles.

King Fahd developed a peace plan in order to resolve Arab differences particularly between Algeria and Morocco. In 1981, he formulated a peace plan for the Middle East to resolve the Arab–Israeli conflict, which was adopted by the Arab League the following year. The initiative, which offers peace to Israel in exchange for the return of Palestinian territories, was revived in almost the same form at a meeting of the League in 2002. He also actively contributed to the Taif accord in 1989 that ended conflict in Lebanon. In addition, he led the Arab world against the invasion of Kuwait by Iraq. He developed a special bond with both Syrian President Hafez al-Assad and Egyptian President Hosni Mobarak during his reign. Due to King Fahd's support to Hafez al-Assad, Arab countries did not manage to realize their decision to end Syrian presence in Lebanon in the summit of the Arab League held in Casablanca, Morocco, in May 1989.

=== Islamic activities ===
He supported the conservative Saudi religious establishment, including spending millions of dollars on religious education, strengthened separation of the sexes and power of the religious police, publicly endorsed Sheikh Abd al-Aziz ibn Baz's warning to young Saudis to avoid the path of evil by not traveling to Europe and the United States. This further distanced him from his inconvenient past.

=== Gulf War, 1991 ===
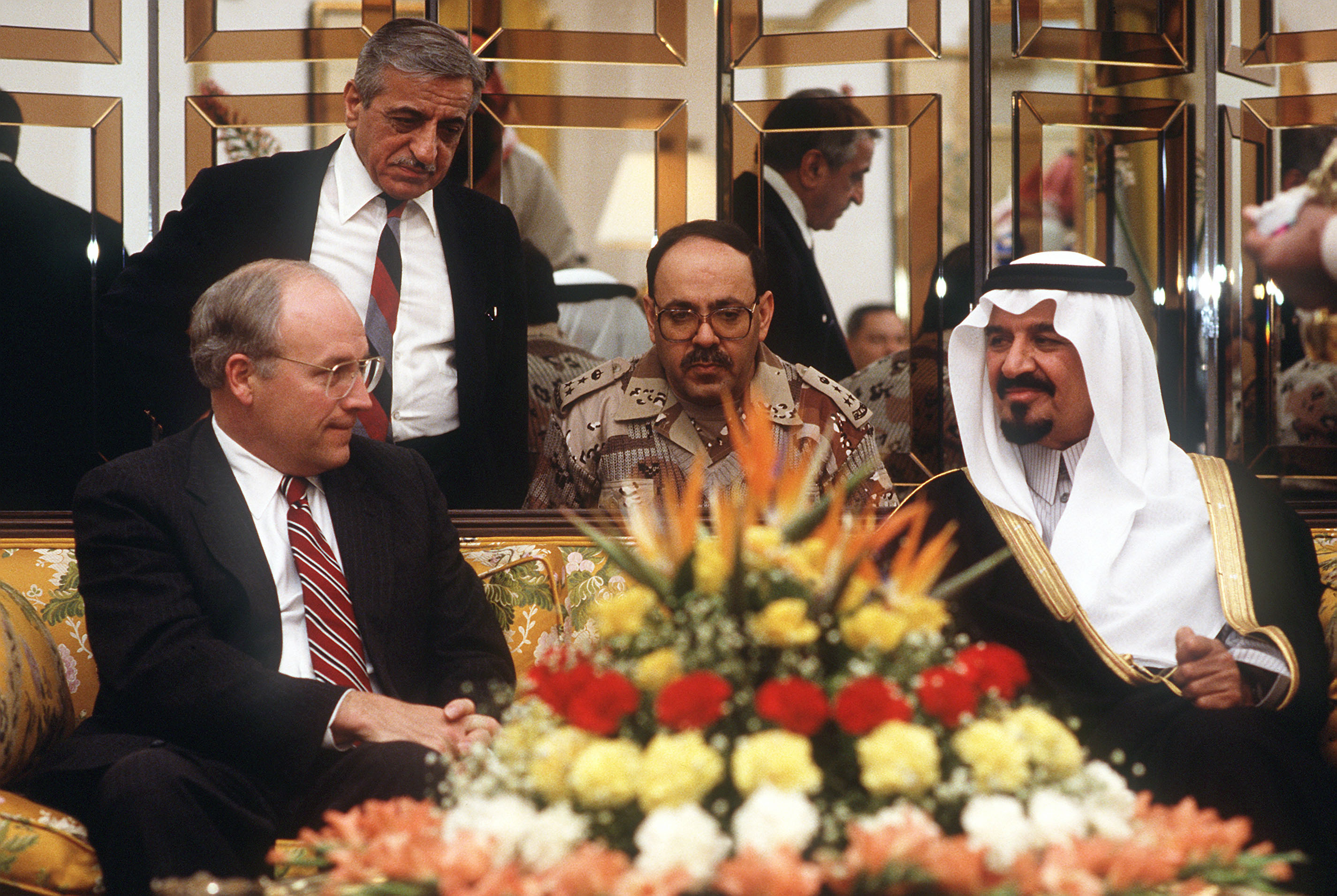
US Secretary of Defense Dick Cheney meets with Saudi Defence Minister Sultan bin Abdulaziz to discuss how to handle the invasion of Kuwait; December 1, 1990

In 1990, Iraqi forces under Saddam Hussein invaded Kuwait, placing the Iraqi army (then the largest in the Middle East) on the Saudi-Kuwaiti border. King Fahd agreed to host American-led coalition troops in his Kingdom and later allowed American troops to be based there. This decision brought him considerable criticism and opposition from many Saudi citizens, who objected to the presence of foreign troops on Saudi soil; this was a casus belli against the Saudi royal family prominently cited by Osama bin Laden and Al Qaeda. His decision was also objected to by his full brothers or the Sudairi Seven. Another cause for criticism came when during an event with the British Royal Family, King Fahd was seen wearing a white decoration in the shape of a cross; in 1994 Bin Laden cited this as "abomination" and "clearly infidelity".

=== Reform and industrialization ===
King Fahd showed little tolerance for reformists. In 1992, a group of reformists and prominent Saudi intellectuals petitioned King Fahd for wide-ranging reforms, including widening political representation and curbing the royal family's wasteful spending. King Fahd first responded by ignoring their requests and when they persisted, reformists were harshly persecuted, imprisoned, and fired from their jobs.

During King Fahd's rule, the royal family's lavish spending of the country's wealth reached its height. In addition, the biggest and most controversial military contract of the century, the Al-Yamamah arms deal was signed on his watch. The contract has cost the Saudi treasury more than $90 billion. These funds were originally allocated to building hospitals, schools, universities, and roads. As a result, Saudi Arabia endured a stagnation in infrastructure development from 1986 until 2005 when the new King, Abdullah, fully came into power.

Like all the countries bordering the Persian Gulf, Saudi Arabia under King Fahd focused its industrial development on hydrocarbon installations. Up to this day, the country is reliant on imports for nearly all its light and heavy machinery.

King Fahd established a Supreme Council of Islamic Affairs directed by senior family members and technocrats in 1994. The council was planned to function as an ombudsman of Islamic activity concerning educational, economic, and foreign policy matters. The chairman of the council was Prince Sultan. Prince Nayef, Prince Saud Al Faisal and technocrat Mohammed bin Ali Aba Al Khail were appointed to the newly established council. One of the covert purposes of the council was thought to be to reduce the power of the Ulemas Council that had been increasing its power.

=== Succession mechanism ===
In an effort to institutionalize succession, King Fahd issued a decree on 1 March 1992. The decree expanded the criteria for succession, which had been only seniority and family consensus, and led to speculations. The most significant change by the edict was that the King did acquire the right to appoint or dismiss his heir apparent based on suitability rather than seniority and that the grandsons of Abdulaziz became eligible for the throne.

=== Increasing disparity in Saudi society ===
With a growing population during King Fahd's rule, the already weak local education system saw a lot more strain being put into it. Due to the decline in oil prices during the early years of his reign, previous initiatives by Faisal and Khalid before him to modernise the education system saw significant setback. The local Saudi education system remained better equipped to teach humanities, with Islamic studies getting more preference under increasing pressure from clerics. As a result, a significant proportion of Saudis would end up studying abroad, typically majoring in the sciences and/or management.

Another consequence of this was the formation of two distinct and increasingly polarised spheres amongst university-educated Saudis. Foreign educated returnees from American and European universities typically occupied well-paid jobs in prestigious ministries with high salaries added with the prestige of being the vanguard of the civil service and government-owned corporations keeping the kingdom on its feet. This was due to such graduates having acquired technical and linguistic skills necessary for such jobs. Meanwhile, local educated Saudis, often having graduated from humanities, found themselves working low-ranking, clerical jobs in the civil service with modest salaries.

Overtime, this led to growing resentment amongst local graduates. Anti-western rhetoric and a call to return to an ultra-orthodox and more religious lifestyle by Wahhabi clerics grew more popular amongst this segment of Saudi society. This was further worsened by increased competition as oil prices continued to drop and more foreign workers kept being issues visas to work in the kingdom.

During this period, the phenomenon of having the same family being divided amongst these lines become more common. The archetype of the ultraconservative Saudi man preaching to his family and friends, showing strong distaste for Western culture, listening to religious cassettes and refusing to take pictures would begin to be cultivated. The term mutawwa' would often be used pejoratively by more liberal Saudis to describe such conservative Saudis.

=== 1995 stroke and aftermath ===
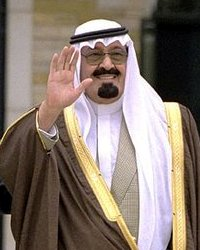
Crown Prince Abdullah assumed some of the duties of government after King Fahd's stroke in 1995.

King Fahd was a heavy smoker, overweight for much of his adult life, and in his sixties began to suffer from arthritis and severe diabetes. He suffered a debilitating stroke on 29 November 1995 and became noticeably frail, and decided to delegate the running of the Kingdom to Crown Prince Abdullah on 2 January 1996. On 21 February, King Fahd resumed official duties.

After his stroke, King Fahd was partly inactive and had to use a cane and then a wheelchair, though he still attended meetings and received selected visitors. In November 2003, according to government media, King Fahd was quoted as saying to "strike with an iron fist" at terrorists after deadly bombings in Saudi Arabia, although he could hardly utter a word because of his deteriorating health. However, it was Crown Prince Abdullah who took official trips; when King Fahd traveled, it was for vacations, and he was sometimes absent from Saudi Arabia for months at a time. When his oldest son and International Olympic Committee member Prince Faisal bin Fahd died in 1999, the King was in Spain and did not return for the funeral.

In a speech to an Islamic conference on 30 August 2003, King Fahd condemned terrorism and exhorted Muslim clerics to emphasize peace, security, cooperation, justice, and tolerance in their sermons.

== Wealth ==
Fortune magazine reported his wealth in 1988 at $18 billion (making him the second-richest person in the world at that time). Forbes estimated Fahd's wealth to be $25 billion in 2002. In addition to residences in Saudi Arabia, he had a palace on Spain's Costa del Sol which made Marbella a famous place.

=== Recreational activities ===
King Fahd was known to enjoy luxurious living abroad and a lavish lifestyle. He visited the ports of the French Riviera in his 147-metre (482 ft) yacht, the US$100 million Prince Abdulaziz. The ship featured two swimming pools, a ballroom, a gym, a theatre, a portable garden, a hospital with an intensive-care unit and two operating rooms, and four American Stinger missiles. The king also had a personal US$150 million Boeing 747 jet, equipped with his own fountain. In Fahd's younger years, he engaged in activities considered un-Islamic, such as drinking and gambling. Fahd reportedly lost millions of dollars in casinos and attempted to regain this money through illegal methods. When Fahd's brothers found out about his habits, which were considered a disgrace to the House of Saud, he was summoned to King Faisal's palace. Upon arrival, King Faisal slapped Fahd across the face. From then on, Fahd ceased indulging in these habits.

== Personal life ==
King Fahd was married at least thirteen times. The spouses of King Fahd were as follows:

- Al Anood bint Abdulaziz bin Musaid Al Saud, mother of his eldest five sons, Prince Faisal, Prince Mohammed, Prince Saud, Prince Sultan and Prince Khalid.
- Al Jawhara bint Ibrahim Al Ibrahim, mother of Prince Abdulaziz bin Fahd
- Noura bint Turki bin Abdullah bin Saud bin Faisal Al Saud, who died in September 2018. King Fahd and Noura had a daughter, Al Anoud bint Fahd.
- Jawza bint Abdullah bin Abdul Rahman Al Saud (Divorced)
- Al Jowhara bint Abdullah Al Sudairi (Deceased)
- Joza'a bint Sultan Al Adgham Al Subaie (Divorced)
- Tarfa bint Abdulaziz bin Muammar (Divorced)
- Watfa bint Obaid bin Ali Al Jabr Al Rasheed (Divorced)
- Lolwa al Abdulrahman al Muhana Aba al Khail (Divorced)
- Fatma bint Abdullah bin Abdulrahman Aldakhil
- Shaikha bint Turki bin Mariq Al Thit (Divorced)
- Seeta bint Ghunaim bin Sunaitan Abu Thnain (Divorced)
- Janan Harb (Widowed)

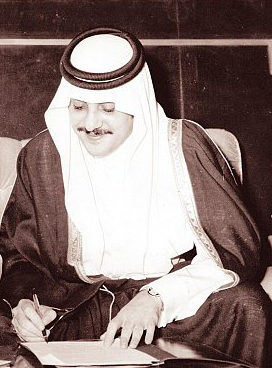
King Fahd's eldest son, Faisal, in 1978

King Fahd had six sons and four daughters. His sons are:

- Faisal bin Fahd (1945–1999) Died of a heart attack. Director-general of youth welfare (1971–1999), director-general at ministry of planning and minister of state (1977–1999)
- Muhammad bin Fahd (January 1950 - January 2025), former governor of the Eastern province
- Saud bin Fahd (born 8 October 1950), former deputy president of the General Intelligence Directorate
- Sultan bin Fahd (born 1951), retired army officer and former head of Youth Welfare
- Khalid bin Fahd (born February 1958)
- Abdulaziz bin Fahd, (born 16 April 1973), Fahd's favourite and youngest son and former minister of state without portfolio. He is the son of Princess Jawhara Al Ibrahim, Fahd's reportedly favourite wife.

His daughters are:

- Al Anoud bint Fahd bin Abdulaziz Al Saud.
- Princess Lulwa bint Fahd bin Abdulaziz Al Saud. was married to Prince Khalid bin Sultan bin Abdulaziz Al Saud and had two children: Prince Faisal and Princess Sarah. Princess Lulwa bint Fahd died on 18 April 2022.
- Princess Latifa bint Fahd bin Abdulaziz Al Saud. She was married to Prince Turki bin Abdullah bin Muhammad bin Abdul Rahman Al Saud and had one son, Prince Faisal. Remarried to Prince Khalid bin Saud bin Muhammad bin Abdulaziz bin Saud Al Saud and had one son, Prince Saud. Latifa bint Fahd died at age 54 in Geneva in late December 2013.
- Princess Al-Jawhara bint Fahd bin Abdulaziz Al Saud. She was married to Prince Turki bin Muhammad bin Saud Al Kabir and has children: Prince Sultan, Prince Fahd, Prince Muhammad, and four daughters. Al Jawhara bint Fahd died in June 2016.

== Death ==
King Fahd was admitted to the King Faisal Specialist Hospital in Riyadh on 27 May 2005 in "stable but serious condition" for unspecified medical tests. An official (who insisted on anonymity) told the Associated Press unofficially that the king had died at 07:30 on 1 August 2005 at age 84. Official statement was announced on state television at 10:00 by Information Minister Iyad Madani.

=== Funeral ===
King Fahd was buried in the last thawb (traditional Arab robe) he wore. Fahd's body was carried to Imam Turki bin Abdullah Mosque, and funeral prayers were held at around 15:30 local time (12:30 GMT) on 2 August. The prayers for the late monarch were led by the Kingdom's grand mufti, Sheikh Abdul Aziz Al Sheikh.

The King's son Abdulaziz carried the body to the mosque and to the Al Oud cemetery, Riyadh, some two kilometres away, a public cemetery where Fahd's four predecessors and other members of the Al Saud ruling family are buried.

Arab and Muslim dignitaries who attended the funeral were not present at the burial. Only ruling family members and Saudi citizens were on hand as the body was lowered into the grave.

Muslim leaders offered condolences at the mosque, while other foreign dignitaries and leaders who came after the funeral paid their respects at the royal court.

In accordance with regulations and social traditions, Saudi Arabia declared a national mourning period of three days during which all offices were closed. Government offices remained closed for the rest of the week. The state flag was not lowered (since the flag of Saudi Arabia bears the Shahada, the Islamic declaration of faith, the flag's protocol requires the flag not to be lowered).

After Fahd's death, many Arab countries declared mourning periods. Algeria, Egypt, Iraq, Kuwait, Lebanon, Morocco, Oman, Qatar, Syria, Yemen, the Arab League in Cairo, and the Palestinian Authority all declared three-day mourning periods. Pakistan and the United Arab Emirates declared a seven-day mourning period and ordered all flags flown at half-staff. In Jordan, a national three-day mourning period was declared and a 40-day mourning period was decreed at the Royal Court.

== Honours ==
Styles of King Fahd
- Reference style: Custodian of the Two Holy Mosques
- Spoken style: Your Majesty

=== Foreign honours ===
Ribbon	Country	Honour	Year
İstiqlal ordeni-lent	Azerbaijan	First Class of the Istiglal Order	7 March 2005
Wisam al-Khalifa 1st class	Bahrain	Collar of the Order of Sheikh Isa bin Salman Al Khalifa	1995
	Denmark	Knight of the Order of the Elephant	1984
	Egypt	Collar of the Order of the Nile	1989
	Iraq	Grand Cordon Order of the Two Rivers	1987
	Italy	Knight Grand Cross with Collar of the Order of Merit of the Italian Republic	19 July 1997
	Kuwait	Collar of the Order of Mubarak the Great	1991
	Kuwait	Collar of the Order of Kuwait	1994
	Malaysia	Honorary Grand Commander of the Order of the Defender of the Realm	1982
	Morocco	Grand Cordon Order of the Throne	1994
	Spain	Collar of the Order of Civil Merit	1977
	Sweden	Knight of the Royal Order of the Seraphim	1981
	Taiwan	Grand Cordon of the Order of Propitious Clouds	July 1977
Order of Independence v. 1959 (Tunisia) - ribbon bar	Tunisia	Collar of the Order of Independence	1994
Order of the Union. Sash ribbon or First Class	United Arab Emirates	Collar of the Order of Etihad (Order of the Federation)	1994
Royal Victorian Chain Ribbon	United Kingdom	Recipient of the Royal Victorian Chain	1987
UK Order St-Michael St-George ribbon	United Kingdom	Knight Grand Cross of the Order of St Michael and St George	1999

In 1984, King Fahd received the Faisal Prize for Service to Islam awarded by the King Faisal Foundation.

== Ancestry ==
Ancestors of Fahd of Saudi Arabia

8. Faisal bin Turki bin Abdullah Al Saud
4. Abdul Rahman bin Faisal
9. Sara bint Mishari bin Abdulrahman bin Hassan Al Saud
2. Abdulaziz ibn Saud
10. Ahmed Al Kabir bin Mohammed bin Turki Al Sudairi
5. Sara bint Ahmed Al Sudairi
1. Fahd bin Abdulaziz Al Saud
12. Muhammed bin Ahmed Al Kabir Al Sudairi
6. Ahmed bin Muhammed Al Sudairi
3. Hassa bint Ahmed Al Sudairi
14. Ali bin Mohammed Al Suwaidi
7. Sharifa bint Ali bin Mohammed Al Suwaidi

== See also ==
- List of things named after Saudi kings#Fahad
- List of covers of Time magazine (1970s), (1990s)

== Notes ==
Fahd of Saudi Arabia House of Saud Born: 1921 Died: 2005
Regnal titles
Preceded by Khalid	King of Saudi Arabia; 13 June 1982 – 1 August 2005	Succeeded by Abdullah
Saudi Arabian royalty
Preceded by Khalid	Crown Prince of Saudi Arabia; 25 March 1975 – 13 June 1982	Succeeded by Abdullah
Political offices
New title	Minister of Education; 1953–1962	Succeeded by Abdullah bin Saleh bin Obaid
Preceded by Faisal bin Turki	Minister of Interior; 1962–1975	Succeeded by Nayef bin Abdulaziz
Preceded by Khalid bin Abdulaziz	Prime Minister of Saudi Arabia; 1982–2005	Succeeded by Abdullah bin Abdulaziz
Sunni Islam titles
Vacant Title last held by Abdülmecid II	Custodian of the Two Holy Mosques; 1986 – 1 August 2005	Succeeded by Abdullah
