= Muhammad bin Fahd Al Saud =

Saudi royal and government official (1950–2025)

Governor of Eastern Province
- Appointed by: King Fahd
- In office: 1985–January 14, 2013
- Born: 4 January 1950; Riyadh, Saudi Arabia
- Died: 28 January 2025 (aged 75)
- Spouse: Jawahir bint Nayef bin Abdulaziz Al Saud
Names
- Mohammad bin Fahd bin Abdulaziz Al Saud
- House: Al Saud
- Father: King Fahd

Muhammad bin Fahd Al Saud (Arabic: محمد بن فهد آل سعود Muḥammad bin Fahd Āl Suʿūd; 4 January 1950 – 28 January 2025) was a Saudi prince, politician, and philanthropist who served as governor of the Eastern Province of Saudi Arabia from 1985 to 2013. He was a prince of the second generation of the royal family and a grandson of the founder of the third Saudi State King Abdulaziz.

== Early life and education ==
Born in Riyadh on 4 January 1950, Muhammad bin Fahd was the second son of King Fahd.

Muhammad bin Fahd received his school education in the Capital Model Institute. He received a bachelor's degree in economics and political sciences from the University of California, Santa Barbara.

== Career and philanthropy ==
After graduating, Muhammad bin Fahd worked in the private sector but was gradually introduced to multiple public assignments. During the early 1970s he was a major stakeholder of the Al Bilad conglomerate. Then he was appointed assistant deputy minister of interior. In 1985, he was named governor of the Eastern Province, and his tenure ended in 2013.

In 1999, he established the Prince Muhammad bin Fahd Foundation for Humanitarian Development, which has launched various humanitarian projects. Among other things, this foundation established the SHIFAA fund, which helps people get medical treatment. He also launched a private university in the Eastern Province, Prince Mohammad University.

In 2016, Muhammad bin Fahd received an honorary doctorate of public service from the University of Central Florida in the United States.

== Personal life and death ==
Muhammad bin Fahd married Jawaher bint Nayef bin Abdulaziz, with whom he had six children: Prince Turki (born 1979), Prince Khaled (born 1984), Prince Abdulaziz (born 1991), Princess Nouf (born 1975), Princess Noura (born 1981) and Princess Mashael (born 1988).

Muhammad died on 28 January 2025, at the age of 75.
