= Embassy of Saudi Arabia, Washington, D.C. =

Royal Embassy of Saudi Arabia, Washington, D.C.
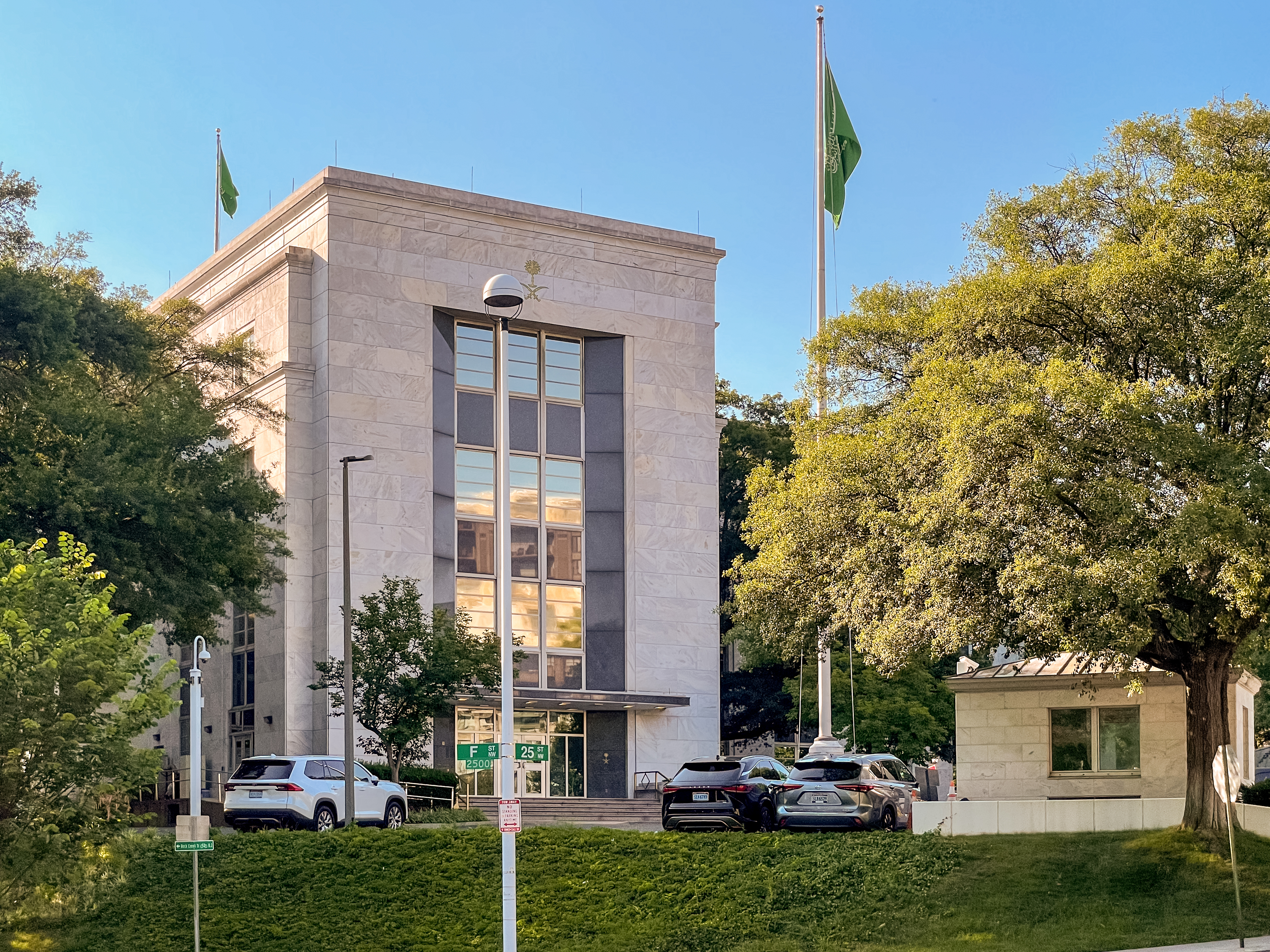
- Location: Washington, D.C.
- Address: 601 New Hampshire Avenue NW/Jamal Khashoggi Way, Washington, DC 20037
- Coordinates: 38°53′52″N 77°3′14″W
- Ambassador: Reema bint Bandar bin Abdulaziz Al Saud
- Website: saudiembassy.net

The Royal Embassy of Saudi Arabia in Washington, D.C. (Arabic: سفارة المملكة العربية السعودية لدى الولايات المتحدة) is the Kingdom of Saudi Arabia's main and largest diplomatic mission to the United States. It is located at 601 New Hampshire Avenue NW/Jamal Khashoggi Way, Washington, D.C., in the Foggy Bottom neighborhood, near the Watergate complex, and Kennedy Center.

== Ambassadors ==
Tenure	Name (English)	Name (Arabic)	House of Saud	Remarks
2019–present	Reema bint Bandar Al Saud	ريما بنت بندر بن سلطان آل سعود	Yes	
2017–2019	Khalid bin Salman bin Abdulaziz Al Saud	خالد بن سلمان بن عبد الله آل سعود	Yes	
October 2015 – April 2017	Abdullah bin Faisal bin Turki bin Abdullah Al Saud	عبد الله بن فيصل بن تركي بن عبد الله آل سعود	Yes	
2007 – October 2015	Adel bin Ahmed Al-Jubeir	عادل بن أحمد الجبير	No	
2005–2007	Turki bin Faisal bin Abdulaziz Al Saud	تركي بن فيصل بن عبد الـعزيز آل سعود	Yes	
1983–2005	Bandar bin Sultan bin Abdulaziz Al Saud	بندر بن سلطان بن عبد العزيز آل سعود	Yes	
1979–1983	Faisal bin Abdulaziz Abdulrahman Al-Hegelan	فيصل بن عبد العزيز عبد الرحمن الحجيلان	No	
1975–1979	Ali Alireza	علي رضا	No	
1964–1975	Ibrahim bin Abdullah bin Abdul Aziz bin Abdullah Al Suwaiyel	إبراهيم بن عبد الله بن عبد العزيز بن عبد الله السويّل	No	
1954–1964	Abdullah Al-Khayyal	عبدالله الخيّال	No	
1945–1954	Assad Al-Faqih	أسعد الفقيه	No	

== Jamal Khashoggi Way ==
In 2021, Advisory Neighborhood Commission 2A voted to rename the street in front of the embassy, New Hampshire Avenue NW, to "Jamal Khashoggi Way", following the assassination of Saudi Arabian journalist Jamal Khashoggi.

== See also ==
- Saudi Arabia–United States relations
- Ambassadors of Saudi Arabia to the United States
- Ambassadors of the United States to Saudi Arabia
