= List of ambassadors of Saudi Arabia to the United States =

Ambassador of Saudi Arabia to the United States of America
- سفير خادم الحرمين الشريفين لدى الولايات المتحدة الأمريكية بدرجة وزير. (Ambassador of the Custodian of the Two Holy Mosques to the United States of America)
- Emblem of Saudi Arabia

- Flag of Saudi Arabia

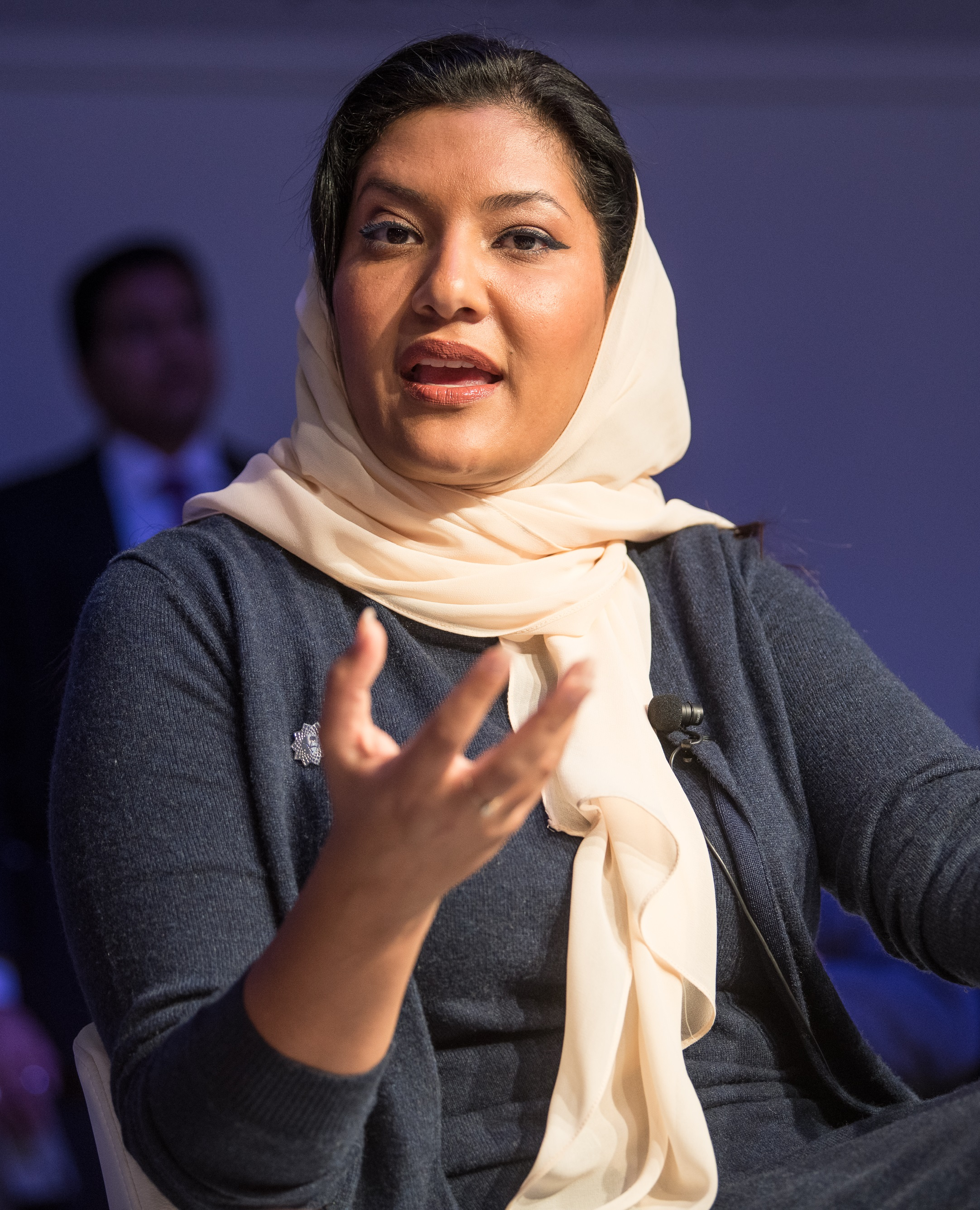
- Incumbent; Reema bint Bandar Al Saud since 23 February 2019
- Ministry of Foreign Affairs of Saudi Arabia; Embassy of Saudi Arabia in Washington, D.C.
- Reports to: Foreign Minister of Saudi Arabia
- Seat: Washington, D.C., United States
- Appointer: The King
- Term length: No fixed term
- Inaugural holder: Assad al-Faqih
- Formation: 1945; 81 years ago
- Website: saudiembassy.net/ambassador

The Ambassador of Saudi Arabia to the United States is the official representative of the Kingdom of Saudi Arabia to the President and Government of the United States of America. The ambassador and the embassy staff work at the Saudi Embassy in Northwest, Washington, D.C. The formal title of the role is Ambassador of the Custodian of the Two Holy Mosques to the United States of America with the rank of Minister.

== List of ambassadors ==
| No. | Portrait | Name | Appointment | Presentation | End of term | Appointer |
|---|---|---|---|---|---|---|
| 1 | | Asad Al Faqih | 1945 | February 8, 1946 | 1954 | King Abdulaziz |
| 2 | | Abdullah al-Khayyal (ar) | 1954 | | 18 September 1964 | King Saud |
| 3 | | Ibrahim Al Suwaiyel | 18 September 1964 | | 1975 | King Faisal |
| 4 | | Ali Reza (ar) | 1975 | | 1979 | King Khalid |
| 5 | | Faisal al-Hegelan | 1979 | | 1983 | King Khalid |
| 6 | | Bandar bin Sultan Al Saud | 1983 | October 24, 1983 | July 20, 2005 | King Fahd |
| 7 | | Turki bin Faisal Al Saud | July 20, 2005 | December 2, 2005 | 29 January 2007 | King Fahd |
| 8 | | Adel al-Jubeir | 29 January 2007 | 27 February 2007 | 28 October 2015 | King Abdullah |
| 9 | | Abdullah bin Faisal bin Turki Al Saud | 28 October 2015 | 30 December 2015 | 23 April 2017 | King Salman |
| 10 | | Khalid bin Salman Al Saud | 23 April 2017 | 21 July 2017 | 23 February 2019 | King Salman |
| 11 | | Reema bint Bandar Al Saud | 23 February 2019 | 8 July 2019 | Present | King Salman |

== See also ==
- Saudi Arabia–United States relations
- Embassy of Saudi Arabia, Washington, D.C.
- Ambassadors of the United States to Saudi Arabia
