= Khalid bin Salman Al Saud =

Saudi Arabian diplomat and politician (born 1988)

His Royal Highness Prince Khalid bin Salman Al Saud
- خالد بن سلمان آل سعود
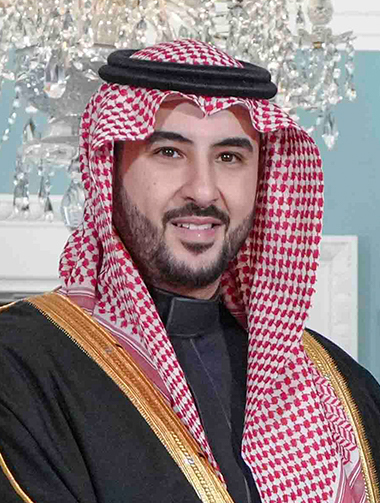
- Khalid in 2025

Minister of Defense
- Incumbent
- Assumed office 27 September 2022
- Monarch: Salman
- Prime Minister: Mohammed bin Salman
- Preceded by: Mohammed bin Salman

Deputy Minister of Defense
- In office 23 February 2019 – 27 September 2022
- Monarch: Salman
- Minister: Mohammed bin Salman Al Saud
- Preceded by: Khalid bin Bandar Al Saud
- Succeeded by: Abdulaziz bin Mohammed bin Ayyaf Al Muqrin

Saudi Ambassador to the United States
- In office 23 April 2017 – 23 February 2019
- Monarch: Salman
- Preceded by: Abdullah bin Faisal Al Saud
- Succeeded by: Reema bint Bandar Al Saud

Personal details
- Born: 1988 (age 37–38) Riyadh, Saudi Arabia
- Spouse: Noura bint Mohammed bin Mishaal bin Abdulaziz Al Saud
- Children: 1
Names
- Khalid bin Salman bin Abdulaziz bin Abdul Rahman
- Parent(s): King Salman bin Abdulaziz; Fahda bint Falah Al Hithlain
- Dynasty: Al Saud
- Relatives: Mohammed bin Salman (brother)
- Education: King Faisal Air Academy

Military service
- Branch/service: Royal Saudi Air Force
- Years of service: until 2016
- Unit: No. 92 Squadron RSAF
- Battles/wars: War against the Islamic State; Saudi Arabian–led intervention in Yemen

Prince Khalid bin Salman Al Saud (Arabic: خالد بن سلمان آل سعود Khālid bin Salmān Āl Suʿūd; born 1988) is a Saudi Arabian diplomat and politician who serves as the Saudi Arabian Minister of Defense. He was appointed Defense Minister on 27 September 2022. He is a grandson of the founder of Saudi Arabia, King Abdulaziz, the tenth child and ninth son of King Salman, and a younger brother of Crown Prince and Prime Minister Mohammed bin Salman.

== Early life and education ==
Prince Khalid bin Salman was born in 1988. He is the son of King Salman and his third spouse Fahda bint Falah Al Hithlain.

Prince Khalid earned a bachelor's degree in Aviation Sciences from King Faisal Air Academy and continued his education in the United States. He obtained a certificate from Harvard University in their senior executives in the national and international security program. He also studied advanced electronic warfare in Paris, France. Prince Khalid was enrolled in Georgetown University to pursue his higher education in the university's master of arts in security studies program. Due to various official duties and tasks, his studies were postponed prior to his appointment as ambassador to the United States.

== Military career ==
After graduating from the King Faisal Air Academy, Prince Khalid joined the Royal Saudi Air Force. He commenced his aviation career by flying T-6 Texan and T-38 aircraft at Columbus Air Force Base in Mississippi. He then started flying F-15S and was also appointed as a Tactical Intelligence Officer in addition to his duties as an F-15S pilot with the 92nd Squadron of the RSAF 3rd Wing at King Abdulaziz Air Base in Dhahran.

Prince Khalid has accumulated nearly 1,000 flying hours and carried out air missions against the jihadist militant group Islamic State of Iraq and the Levant within the International Coalition's efforts. He also participated in Operation Decisive Storm and Operation Restoring Hope by flying missions over Yemen.

Prince Khalid was awarded medals including: South Shield Medal, the Battle Medal, the Excellence Medal, and the Abdullah's Sword Medal.

Prince Khalid trained extensively with the American armed forces both in the United States and in Saudi Arabia, including his training at Nellis Air Force Base in Nevada. A back injury prohibited Prince Khalid from flying, which prompted him to work as an officer at the office of the Minister of Defense.

== Diplomatic career ==
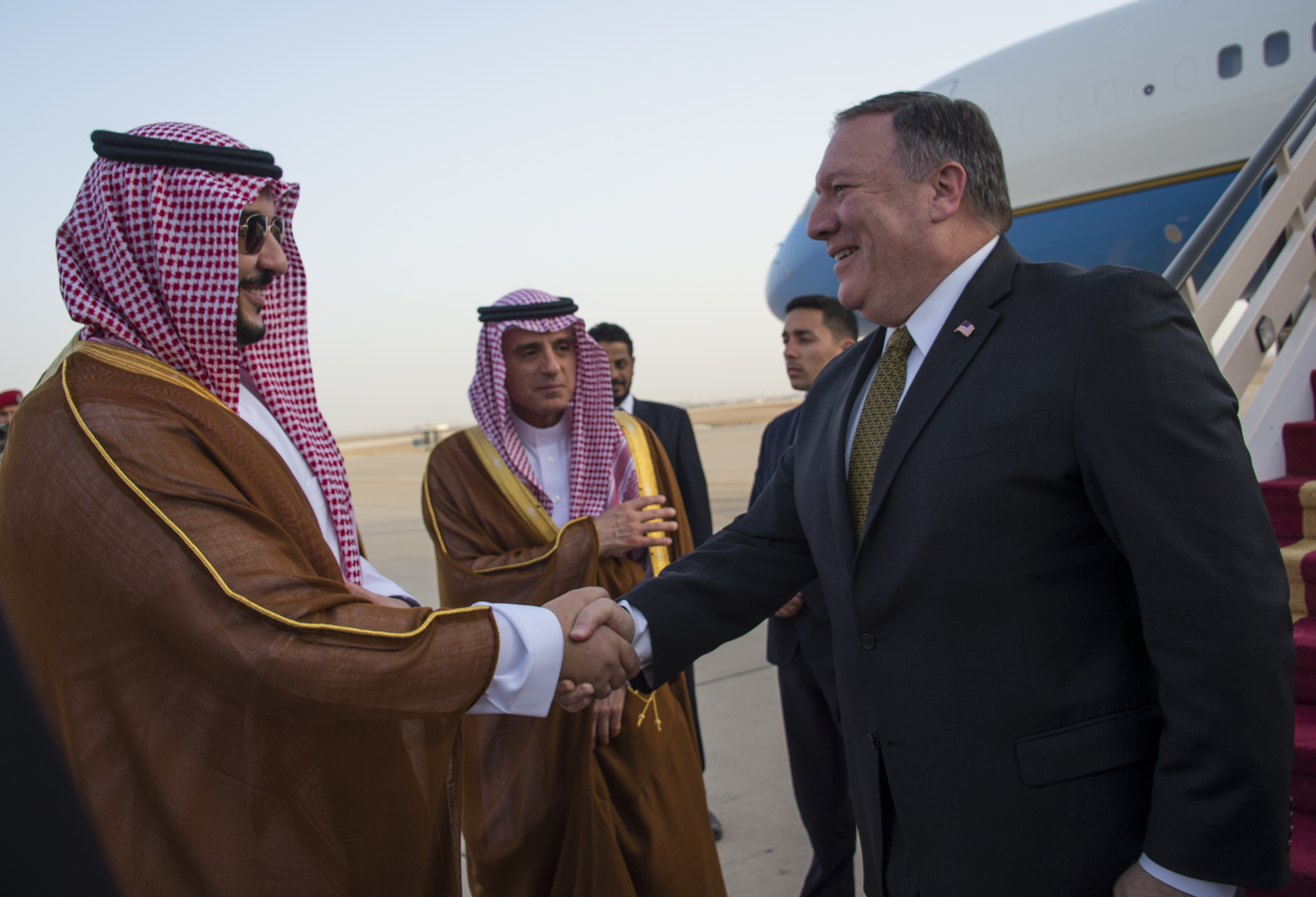
Saudi Ambassador to the US Khalid bin Salman greets US Secretary of State Mike Pompeo in Riyadh, 28 April 2018. Behind them is Saudi Minister of Foreign Affairs Adel Al Jubeir.

After his military career, he was appointed as a senior civilian advisor at the Ministry of Defense. By late 2016, Prince Khalid moved to the United States where he worked as an advisor at the Royal Embassy of Saudi Arabia in Washington.

=== Saudi Ambassador to the United States ===
In April 2017, Prince Khalid became the tenth Saudi Ambassador to the United States since 1945.

In March 2018, Prince Khalid appeared on CNN in discussion with Wolf Blitzer to preview Crown Prince Mohammed bin Salman's trip to the United States. He authored a column in the Washington Post on 19 March 2018 that outlined the ways in which the Kingdom of Saudi Arabia was embracing change, and how the Saudi–U.S. relationship could be strengthened as a result of this transformation.

=== Jamal Khashoggi ===
Jamal Khashoggi, a journalist, visited the Saudi Arabian consulate in Istanbul on Tuesday, 2 October 2018, and was murdered within minutes. The following Monday, 8 October, Khalid bin Salman denied that the Saudis had detained or killed Khashoggi.

According to a leaked CIA assessment, whose details were reported by several news outlets, including the Washington Post, Prince Khalid had instructed Khashoggi to go to the Saudi consulate in Istanbul to pick up the papers he needed, assuring him that it would be safe for him to do so.

Prince Khalid denied the charges.

According to Hürriyet columnist Abdulkadir Selvi, the Director of the Central Intelligence Agency Gina Haspel had possession of the "smoking gun phone call" in which crown prince Mohammad was recorded giving orders to his brother Khaled, then Saudi Arabia's ambassador to the US, "to Silence Jamal Khashoggi as Soon as Possible". The subsequent murder is the ultimate confirmation of this instruction."

=== Deputy Minister of Defense ===
In February 2019, Khalid was appointed Deputy Defense Minister of Saudi Arabia and was replaced by Reema bint Bandar Al Saud as ambassador to the US.

In September 2021, Prince Khalid met with Russian Deputy Minister of Defense Colonel General Alexander Fomin to sign an agreement to develop joint military cooperation between the two countries.

=== Minister of Defense ===
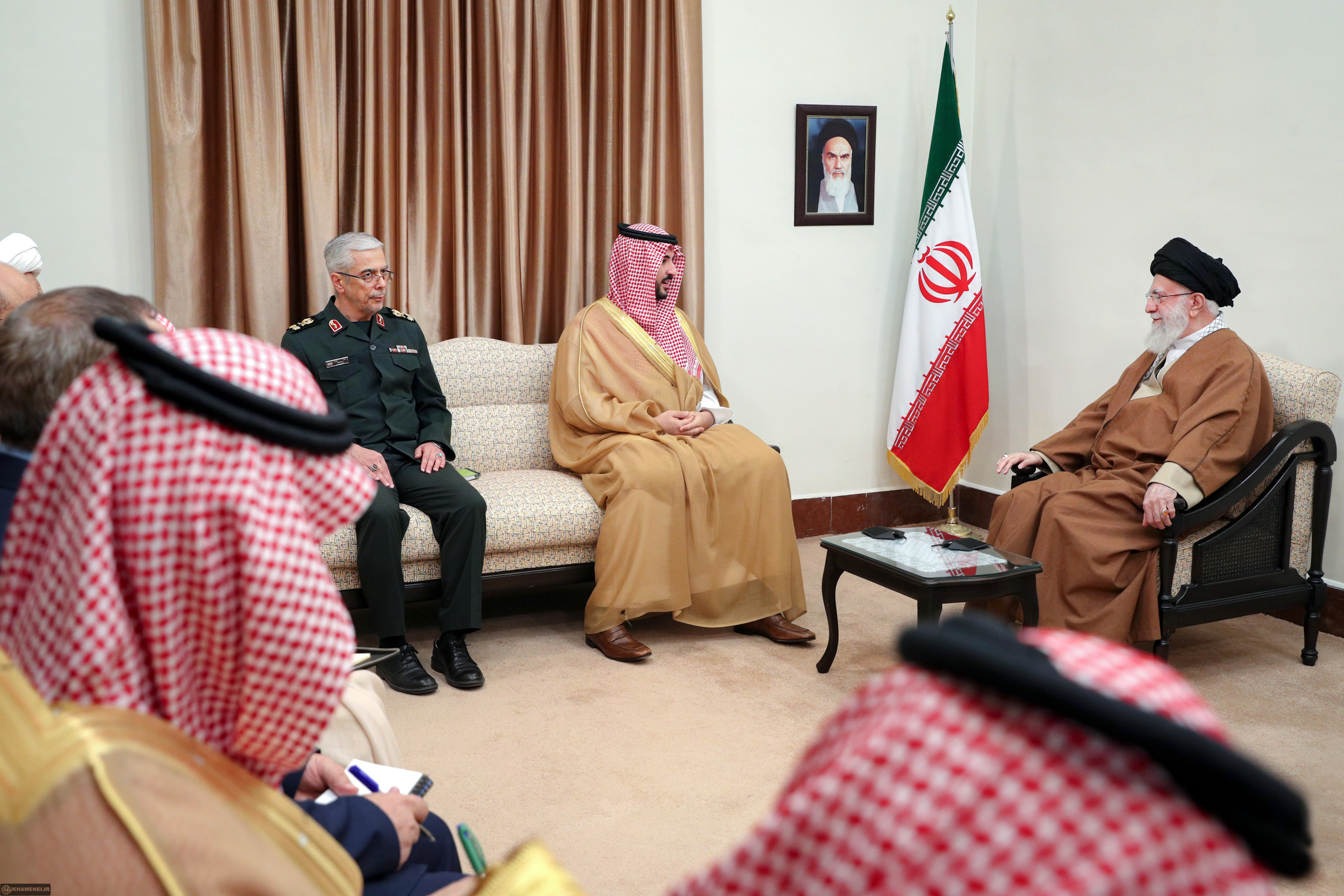
Prince Khalid with Iran's Supreme Leader Ayatollah Ali Khamenei and Major General Mohammad Bagheri, 17 April 2025

On 27 September 2022, Prince Khalid was appointed Defense Minister of the Kingdom of Saudi Arabia.

In February 2024, Prince Khalid was appointed as Chairman of the Board of the Saudi Arabian Military Industries, a company fully owned by the Saudi Public Investment Fund and built in 2017 whose goal is to achieve one of the Vision 2030 goals of localizing fifty percent of Saudi's military spending.

On 24 March 2024, Pakistani President Asif Ali Zardari conferred the Nishan-e-Pakistan award, Pakistan's highest civilian award, to Prince Khalid.

On 3 May 2024, Prince Khalid launched the new facilities of the King Faisal Air Academy. On 5 June 2024, Prince Khalid, together with several senior officials, inaugurated the National Defence University, formerly known as the Saudi Armed Forces Command and Staff College.

In February 2025 he met U.S Secretary of Defense Pete Hegseth at The Pentagon for bilateral talks.

On 17 April 2025, he met with Ali Khamenei (The Supreme Leader of Iran) in Office of the Supreme Leader of Iran to deliver a message from Salman of Saudi Arabia (King of Saudi Arabia).

== Ancestry ==
Ancestry of Khalid bin Salman bin Abdulaziz Al Saud

16. Faisal bin Turki bin Abdullah Al Saud
8. Abdul Rahman bin Faisal
17. Sara bint Mishari bin Abdulrahman bin Hassan Al Saud
4. Ibn Saud
18. Ahmed Al Kabir bin Mohammed bin Turki Al Sudairi
9. Sara bint Ahmed Al Sudairi
2. Salman Al Saud
20. Mohammed bin Ahmed Al Kabir Al Sudairi
10. Ahmed bin Mohammed Al Sudairi
5. Hassa bint Ahmed Al Sudairi
22. Ali bin Mohammed Al Suwaidi
11. Sharifa bint Ali bin Mohammed Al Suwaidi
1. Khalid Al Saud
24. Hithlain
12. Sultan bin Hithlain
6. Falah bin Sultan
3. Fahda bint Falah Al Hithlain
14. Abdullah
7. Munira bint Abdullah
