= Abdullatif bin Ahmed Al Othman =

Saudi Arabian engineer

- Born: Abdullatif bin Ahmed bin Abdullah Al Othman
- Education: King Fahd University of Petroleum and Minerals; MIT Sloan School of Management
- Occupation: Engineer
- Years active: 1980s–present

Abdullatif bin Ahmed Al Othman Arabic: عبد اللطيف أحمد العثمان) is a businessperson who is the third governor of Saudi Arabian General Investment Authority (SAGIA).

== Education ==
Al Othman received his bachelor's degree in civil engineering from King Fahd University of Petroleum and Minerals (KFUPM) in Dhahran in 1979. He obtained a master's degree in business management from the MIT Sloan School of Management as a Sloan Fellow in 1998.

== Career ==
Al Othman began working for Saudi Aramco in 1981 as an engineer. He became the executive director of Saudi Aramco Affairs in June 2001 and then, was appointed vice president of Saudi Aramco Affairs in September 2001. He became vice president of finance in 2003 and was later appointed senior vice president of Saudi Aramco for financial affairs in May 2005. He was chairman of board of directors of the Sadara chemical company established in late November 2011. The company is a joint venture of Saudi Aramco and Dow Chemical Company.

During his term in Saudi Aramco, Al Othman was also the president for the project management institute (PMI) Persian Gulf chapter and was a member of the International Association of Energy Economics. He was also among the advisory board members of the Business Administration College of King Saud University. Al Othman is a board member of the Saafah Foundation for Good Example that attempts to encourage transparency and honesty in Saudi Arabia.

Al Othman was appointed to the Saudi Arabian General Investment Authority (SAGIA) as governor at the rank of minister on 18 May 2012, replacing Amr Dabbagh. Al Othman was also named as the chairman of the SAGIA board of directors. In addition, he was named as the chairman of the economic cities authority. He served as the head of the Saudi Arabian General Investment Authority until 23 April 2017 when he was replaced by Ibrahim Al Omar. As of 2022 he is a board member of the Banque Saudi Fransi.

Al Othman was chosen by the Gulf Business to be the world's 50th most influential Arabs in 2012.
