= Abdullah bin Faisal Al Saud (born 1951) =

Saudi royal, government official, and diplomat (born 1951)

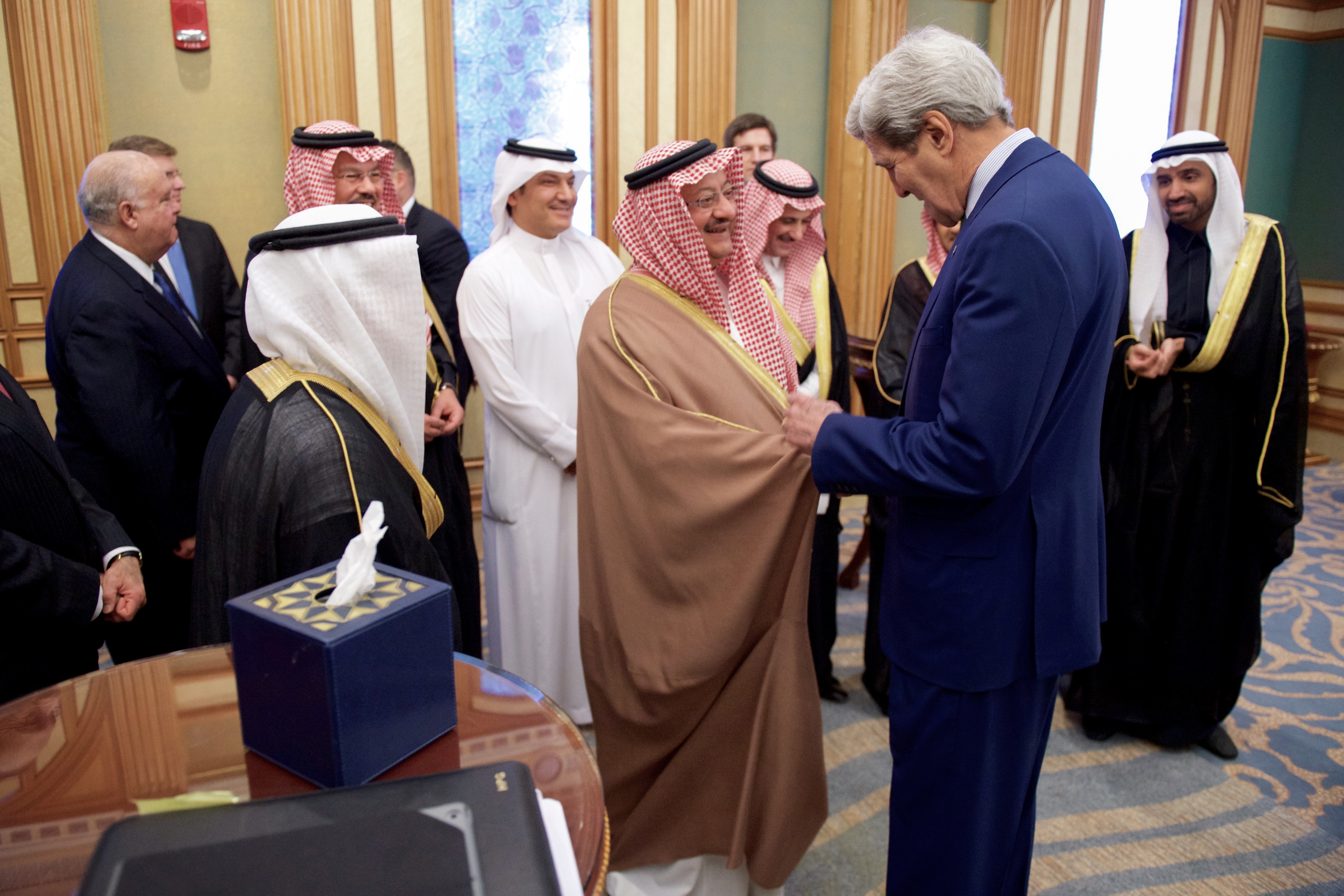
- Abdullah bin Faisal meeting John Kerry

Governor of Saudi Arabian General Investment Authority
- In office: 2000–2004
- Predecessor: Office established
- Successor: Amr Dabbagh
- Monarch: King Fahd

Saudi Arabian Ambassador to the United States
- In office: October 2015 – 23 April 2017
- Predecessor: Adel al-Jubeir
- Successor: Khalid bin Salman Al Saud
- Monarch: King Salman
- Born: 1951 (age 74–75); Taif, Saudi Arabia
Names
- Abdullah bin Faisal bin Turki bin Abdullah Al Saud
- House: Al Saud
- Father: Faisal bin Turki bin Abdullah bin Saud Al Saud
- Mother: Luluwah bint Abdulaziz Al Saud

Abdullah bin Faisal Al Saud (Arabic: عبد الله بن فيصل آل سعود; born 1951) is a Saudi royal and government official who served as the Saudi Arabian ambassador to the United States from October 2015 to April 2017.

== Early life and education ==
Abdullah bin Faisal was born in Taif in 1951. His mother, Luluwah bint Abdulaziz, was a full sister of the Sudairi Seven. He is the oldest of six siblings. His brother, Sultan bin Faisal bin Turki, was killed in a car crash at age 41 on 23 July 2002 while coming from Jeddah to Riyadh to participate in funeral prayers for Prince Ahmed, son of Prince Salman. Prince Abdullah is the brother-in-law of Abdul Rahman bin Abdullah bin Faisal Al Saud, Sultan bin Fahd Al Saud and Saud bin Nayef Al Saud.

Prince Abdullah's family on the father's side is directly descended from Saud bin Faisal. Saud's rule as well as that of his brother Abdullah witnessed civil war between these rulers, leading to the end of the second Saudi state after an invasion of Ottomans early in the 19th century.

Prince Abdullah received elementary and secondary education in Saudi Arabia. He then went to the United Kingdom for higher education where he studied engineering.

== Career and activities ==
Following graduation, Abdullah bin Faisal first worked at a factory in England. His early career as an engineer involved both technical and management positions in Saudi Arabia. He assumed the responsibility of the coordination of various studies for the two industrial cities, and later for the industrial security and safety sector.

Abdullah bin Faisal was the acting secretary general between 1975 and 1977 at the Royal Commission for Jubail and Yanbu immediately after established by King Khalid in 1975. Then, he was appointed secretary general of the royal commission in 1987. Next, he was appointed chairman of the body in 1991 and served as chief executive officer of the commission and chairman of its board of directors.

In April 2000 the Saudi Arabian General Investment Authority (SAGIA) was created, responsible for promotions of the foreign and domestic investments in Saudi Arabia. Prince Abdullah was appointed governor of the SAGIA with the rank of minister in 2000. His tenure lasted until 2004 when he resigned from this post. It was speculated that since he was frustrated with the government's bureaucratic approach and the slow pace of the reforms in the country, he left the SAGIA.

Prince Abdullah was the chairman of Saudi Italian Development Company (SIDCO), charged with the task of revitalizing Saudi Arabia's economy. Since he had knowledge of the Italian economy, he was regarded as the most appropriate figure to support the commercial relations between Saudi Arabia and Italy.

In October 2015 Prince Abdullah became the Saudi ambassador to the USA. He succeeded Adel al-Jubeir in the post. On 23 April 2017 Prince Khalid bin Salman Al Saud replaced Prince Abdullah as ambassador to the USA.

=== SAGIA governorship ===
During his tenure at the SAGIA Prince Abdullah strongly supported both liberal policies and privatization in the Saudi Arabia's economy. Nearly 2,000 foreign business licenses were issued during his tenure. The worth of these licenses were estimated to be 15 billion U.S. dollars. Prince Abdullah further encouraged the membership of Saudi Arabia to the World Trade Organization. However, this goal was not achieved at that time because of Saudi Arabia's protectionist policies towards the industries of oil production and telecommunications, and its inability to produce a formal trade agreement with the United States.

== Personal life ==
Abdullah bin Faisal is married and has four children: Turki, Salman, Al Anoud and Sarah. He is keenly interested in environmental issues and in international relations as well as in the arts.
