= Stefano Marzano =

Italian Architect and Designer

Stefano Marzano (born 13 October 1950) is an Italian architect and designer. He was Chief Design Officer at Royal Philips International and Electrolux.

== Education ==
Marzano studied architecture at Politecnico of Milano. Marzano holds a doctorate in Architecture at the same Politecnico of Milano, a H.C. doctorate in design from the University Sapienza in Roma and a H.C. doctorate in Design from the PolyU of Hong Kong.

== Career ==
Until 1998 he was a professor at the Domus Academy in Milan, and a member of the academy's strategic board. In 1999–2001 and 2017 -2019 he was a professor at the Design University at Politecnico di Milano. Marzano is also the author and editor of several books on design.

He served as Chief Design Officer and CEO of Philips Design at Royal Philips International between 1991 and 2011. He served as Chief Design Officer and as member of the Group Management at Electrolux from January 2012 until he retired at the end of 2013.

Marzano is a member of the European Design Leadership Board. He is an adviser to several design schools around the world : for example is Founding Dean and Advisory Board Member of THNK School of Creative Leadership. He was chairman of the advisory board and co-funder of the faculty of Design of the TUe, the Eindhoven University of Technology.

In 2005, Businessweek named Marzano one of 38 global "Best Leaders." He has also received honorary doctorates in design from the Sapienza University of Rome and the Hong Kong Polytechnic University.
