= THNK School of Creative Leadership =

THNK School of Leadership is an international executive education organization headquartered in Amsterdam. The school was founded in 2010

== History ==
THNK was launched in 2010 as a public-private partnership supported by the Dutch government, the city of Amsterdam, the province of North Holland, Vodafone, McKinsey & Company, KLM Airlines, and a host of other private and public entities. It was founded to establish Amsterdam as a creative center and boost the city's innovation ecosystem. Partly funded by the City of Amsterdam, and influenced by the leadership thinking and creative modeling of companies such as McKinsey, Pixar, IDEO, and Philips, “THNK intentionally chose to stay outside of the formal education system so that it could create its own version of what leadership training for the 21st century should look like”. In 2014, THNK expanded to Vancouver.

The co-founders were Bas Verhart and Menno van Dijk. Stefano Marzano, former Chief Design Officer of Philips, was the Founding Dean of the new course.

== Programs ==
- Executive Leadership Program
- Custom Programs: THNK works with different organizations on special programs. THNK has worked with FIFA to support and develop female leaders at the senior decision-making level in football, with Stanford University to deliver the mediaX Global Innovation Leadership program, with World Economic Forum to deliver the Global Leadership Fellows Program and with the Dubai Future Academy to deliver an Executive Education Program.

== Notable alumni ==
- Anya Ayoung-Chee
- Mark Brand
- Princess Reema bint Bandar Al Saud
- Easkey Britton
- Wempy Dyocta Koto
- Jon Gosier
- Jürgen Griesbeck, Founder of Common Goal
- Osher Günsberg
- Rand Hindi
- Hermen Hulst, Founder of Guerrilla Games
- Ellen Jorgensen
- Katherine Maher, executive director at Wikimedia Foundation
