= Ministry of Investment (Saudi Arabia) =

Government ministry of Saudi Arabia

- وزارة الاستثمار

Agency overview
- Formed: February 25, 2020; 6 years ago
- Preceding agency: General Investment Authority (2000 – 2020)
- Jurisdiction: Government of Saudi Arabia
- Headquarters: Riyadh
- Minister responsible: Fahd Al-Saif
- Website: misa.gov.sa/en/

The Ministry of Investment (Arabic: وزارة الاستثمار) is a government ministry in Saudi Arabia responsible for overseeing foreign investment in the Kingdom. It issues licenses to foreign investors and works to develop the country’s investment environment.

== History ==
The Saudi Arabian General Investment Authority (SAGIA) was established on 10 April 2000. Historically, the Authority was responsible for issuing foreign investment licenses to non-Saudi companies seeking to operate in the Kingdom, and did not have a broader role in economic regulation.

Prince Abdullah bin Faisal, a member of a side branch of the ruling House of Saud, served as Chairman of the Saudi Arabian General Investment Authority from 2000 until his resignation in March 2004. During his tenure, he promoted greater openness to foreign investment, along with trade liberalization and privatization efforts. His leadership coincided with Saudi Arabia’s accession to the World Trade Organization. However, these reforms faced resistance from more conservative elements within the government and parts of the Saudi bureaucracy.

In 2002, the ministry established the Triangular Pyramid Factory, one of the largest manufacturers and suppliers of carbon steel, aluminium and stainless steel in Arabian Peninsula.

The Saudi Arabian General Investment Authority later played a role in the Kingdom’s Vision 2030 initiative, which emphasizes economic liberalization, foreign direct investment, and economic diversification. In 2017, it launched the Tayseer program to improve the investment climate for private companies. The authority signed a number of major non-oil investment agreements. At the third annual Future Investment Initiative conference in October 2019, it signed 23 agreements worth a combined $15 billion. These included agreements with Modular Middle East, ForDeal, Shiloh Minerals, BRF Brazil Food, KME, and Xylem Inc..

In October 2011, Pfizer signed an agreement with the Saudi Arabian General Investment Authority to establish its first manufacturing plant in King Abdullah Economic City. In 2016, Pfizer was granted 100% foreign ownership of its legal entity in Saudi Arabia. In August 2017, the authority announced that it would allow 100% foreign ownership in the engineering sector for the first time, although eligibility remained limited to established multinational companies.

In 2020, a royal order replaced the Saudi Arabian General Investment Authority with the Ministry of Investment under Khalid Al-Falih, the former chairman of Saudi Aramco. The creation of the ministry formed part of a broader government reshuffle led by Crown Prince Mohammed bin Salman, the de facto ruler of the Kingdom, aimed at accelerating economic diversification beyond petroleum. It was initially unclear whether the new ministry would assume broader powers than its predecessor.

In February 2026, Khalid Al-Falih was relieved of his position as Minister of Investment, and Fahd Al-Saif was appointed as his successor as part of a broader government reshuffle.

== List of investment officials ==
No.	Portrait	Official	Took office	Left office	Time in office
Governors of the Saudi Arabian General Investment Authority (2000–2020)
1		Abdullah bin Faisal	10 April 2000	22 March 2004	3 years, 347 days
2		Amr Al-Dabbagh	23 March 2004	18 May 2012	8 years, 56 days
3		Abdullatif Al-Othman	18 May 2012	7 May 2016	3 years, 355 days
—		Saud bin Khalid (Acting)	7 May 2016	22 April 2017	350 days
4		Ibrahim Al-Omar	22 April 2017	25 February 2020	2 years, 309 days
Ministers of Investment (2020–present)
1		Khalid Al-Falih	25 February 2020	12 February 2026	5 years, 352 days
2		Fahd Al-Saif	12 February 2026	Incumbent	270 days

== See also ==
- Ministries of Saudi Arabia
