= Asad Al Faqih =

Lebanese-origin Saudi diplomat (1910–1989)

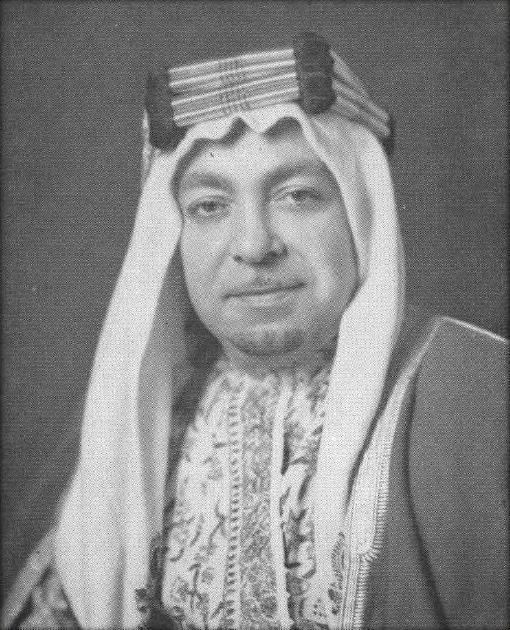

Ambassador of Saudi Arabia to the United States
- In office 1945–1954
- Preceded by: Office established
- Succeeded by: Abdullah bin Abdulaziz Al Khayal

Personal details
- Born: Asad Mansur Al Faqih; January 1910 Aley, Lebanon
- Died: 2 April 1989 (aged 78–79) Walnut Creek, California, U.S.
- Spouse: Yaqout Ruby
- Children: 7

Asad Al Faqih (Arabic: أسعد الفقيه; 1910–1989) was a Lebanese diplomat who worked for the Saudi Arabian Ministry of Foreign Affairs. He was one of the foreign advisors of King Abdulaziz and was the first ambassador of Saudi Arabia to the United States which he held between 1948 and 1955.

== Early life and education ==
Al Faqih was born in Aley, Lebanon, in January 1910 to a Druze family who was part of the Bani Maarouf Arabs. He graduated from a high school in his hometown. Then he attended Jesuit University, precursor of Saint Joseph University, in Beirut and received a degree in law in the mid-1920s.

== Career and activities ==
Following his graduation, Al Faqih worked as a lawyer. He settled in Saudi Arabia when the Ministry of Foreign Affairs which had been established in Jeddah in 1930 offered him a position. He was made a citizen of Saudi Arabia. First he worked as a second deputy at the Ministry. He was named as the second secretary at the diplomatic mission of Saudi Arabia in Baghdad, Kingdom of Iraq, on 3 March 1933. He was appointed minister plenipotentiary of Saudi Arabia to the Kingdom of Iraq in 1943.

Al Faqih was one of officials who participated in the inaugural meeting of the United Nations and signed the Charter of the United Nations on behalf of Saudi Arabia in San Francisco on 26 June 1945. Saudi Arabia opened its diplomatic mission in Washington, D.C., in 1946, and Al Faqih headed it first as envoy extraordinary and then as minister plenipotentiary. He was appointed ambassador extraordinary and plenipotentiary in 1948 when the Saudi Arabian diplomatic mission was redesigned as Embassy. During his term he was also Saudi Arabia's non-resident ambassador to Canada and Mexico. In addition, he was the Saudi Arabia's delegate to the United Nations from 1946 to 1955. Al Faqih's term ended in 1955, and he was replaced by Abdullah bin Abdulaziz Al Khayal as ambassador of Saudi Arabia to the United States.

Al Faqih continued to work at the Ministry of Foreign Affairs in various capacities until his retirement in 1963. He was instrumental in creating a new senior post at the Ministry.

== Later years, personal life and death ==
Al Faqih married Yaqout Ruby in Aley in 1931. She published a cookbook containing recipes from different regions in 1968. They had seven children, 5 daughters and 2 sons. Their eldest daughter, Selma, wed at the Saudi Arabian Embassy in Washington, D.C., in April 1954.

Following his retirement from diplomatic post Al Faqih settled in Aley, Lebanon. Then he settled in Walnut Creek, California, USA, in 1984. He died in Walnut Creek from prostate cancer on 2 April 1989.
