= Faisal bin Bandar bin Sultan Al Saud =

Saudi royal and businessman

Chairman of the Saudi Esports Federation
- In office: 2017 – present
- Monarch: King Salman

Vice President of the Global Esports Federation
- In office: 1 December 2021 – present

President of the International Esports Federation
- In office: November 26, 2023– present
- Predecessor: Vlad Marinescu
- Spouse: Muneera bint Mohammed bin Rashid Al Jaber Al Rasheed
Names
- Faisal bin Bandar bin Sultan bin Abdulaziz bin Abdul Rahman bin Faisal Al Saud
- House: Al Saud
- Father: Bandar bin Sultan
- Mother: Haifa bint Faisal
- Education: Baylor University

Faisal bin Bandar Al Saud (Arabic: فيصل بن بندر آل سعود) is a Saudi royal. He is the chairman of Saudi Esports Federation and the Arab eSports Federation since 2017. He is also vice president of the Global Esports Federation.

Styles of Faisal bin Bandar Al Saud
- Reference style: His Royal Highness
- Spoken style: Your Royal Highness

== Early life and education ==
Faisal's parents are Bandar bin Sultan and Haifa bint Faisal. He is the brother of Reema bint Bandar and Khalid bin Bandar.

Faisal bin Bandar received a bachelor's degree in telecommunications from Baylor University in Waco, Texas, in 2003.

== Career ==
Prince Faisal moved back to Saudi Arabia following his graduation and started several local businesses. In 2012 he established a company called Saker Al Jazirah which focused on recycling, waste management and environmental services. He is also chairman of a media company called Banader Al Khaleej.

In 2017 Prince Faisal entered government work when he was named the president of the Federation for Electronic and Intellectual Sports which was later renamed as the Arab eSports Federation. From 1 December 2021 he is also the vice president of the Global Esports Federation. In November 2023, he was elected as the president of the International Esports Federation (IESF), with his term extending until 2025.

== Personal life ==
Faisal bin Bandar married Muneera bint Mohammed bin Rashid Al Jaber Al Rasheed in 2014.
