= Haifa bint Faisal Al Saud =

Saudi royal (born 1950)

- Born: 1950 (age 75–76); Paris, France
- Spouse: Bandar bin Sultan Al Saud
- Issue: 8, Reema, Khalid, Faisal, Fahd, Loloa, Noura, Hussa, Abdulaziz
Names
- Haifa bint Faisal bin Abdulaziz bin Abdul Rahman Al Saud
- House: Al Saud
- Father: King Faisal
- Mother: Iffat Al Thunayan

Haifa bint Faisal Al Saud (Arabic: هيفاء بنت فيصل آل سعود; born 1950) is a member of the House of Saud. She is one of the grandchildren of Saudi Arabia's founder King Abdulaziz and one of the children of King Faisal.

== Early life ==
Haifa bint Faisal was born in July 1950. She is the daughter of King Faisal and Princess Iffat who was born to a Circassian family. She is the full sister of Mohammed bin Faisal, Saud bin Faisal, Luluwah bint Faisal, Sara bint Faisal and Turki bin Faisal.

== Personal life ==
Haifa is the spouse of Bandar bin Sultan. They have eight children, four daughters and four sons, including Reema, Khalid, and Faisal.

Haifa told that when she saw Bandar first, she had a feeling she would marry him. After four years, in 1972 they married. She said that their marriage was not a pre-arranged one. Her mother, Iffat, was a friend of Bandar's grandmother, Hassa. She further said that her mother also liked Bandar.

== Philanthropy ==
Princess Haifa is the founder of the Albaydha Housing Project, the national pilot for developmental housing in the Kingdom of Saudi Arabia. She is also the founder and chairwoman of the Zahra Breast Cancer Association in the Kingdom.

Princess Haifa is also a board member of Effat University and the National Museum of Saudi Arabia.

== 9/11 Commission Report ==
After the September 11 attacks, Princess Haifa was investigated for a sequence of payments allegedly made to a Saudi national by the name of Omar al-Bayoumi. Investigation has confirmed that some of the payments were in fact forwarded to al-Bayoumi's wife, Manal Bajadr; the significance of these payments (and the extent to which they may have assisted the hijackers) is unclear. In April 1998, Osama Basnan, a Saudi national living in California, wrote to Haifa requesting money for his wife's needed thyroid surgery. Haifa sent Basnan $15,000, although his wife, Majeda Dweikat, was not actually treated for another two years.

The 9/11 Commission Report states in footnote 122: "We have found no evidence that Saudi Princess Haifa al Faisal provided any funds to the conspiracy, either directly or indirectly."

At some later point (accounts vary as to when; dates between November 1999 and March 2000 were given, and a Saudi government official put the onset at 4 December 1999), Haifa began sending monthly cashier's checks to Dweikat of either $2,000 or $3,500, transporting them through Riggs Bank. Dweikat signed some of these checks over to her friend Manal Bajadr, wife of Omar al-Bayoumi. The payments continued through May 2002 and eventually totaled as much as $73,000. (This sort of charitable donation known as Zakat from members of the House of Saud to Saudi nationals living abroad is not particularly unusual.)

According to the Saudi daily, Al Riyadh, Haifa became "so terrified" that she asked that all checks drawn against her bank account with the Riggs Bank in Washington, D.C. since 1994 be examined. Some of these investigations led to the Riggs Bank scandals of 2003 and 2004. In 2002, in regard to the accusations against Prince Turki, her brother, stated "Any allegations about money from my sister reaching the hijackers is allegation and half-truths and totally untrue."
