= Reema bint Bandar Al Saud =

Saudi Ambassador to the United States

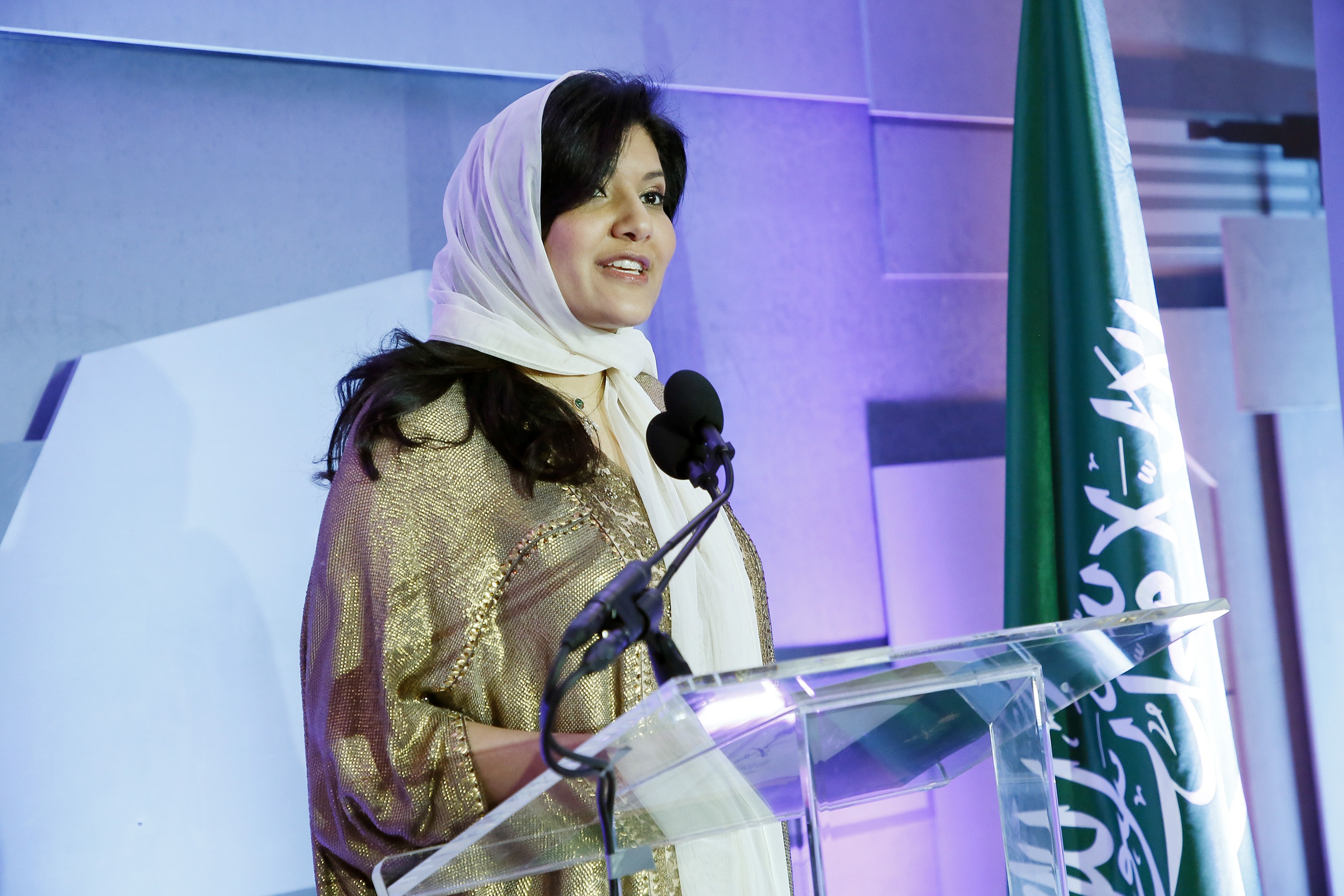
- Princess Reema in 2020

11th Ambassador of Saudi Arabia to the United States
- Tenure: 23 February 2019 – present
- Predecessor: Khalid bin Salman Al Saud
- Monarch: Salman
- Born: 15 February 1975 (age 51); Riyadh, Saudi Arabia
- Spouse: Faisal bin Turki bin Nasser Al Saud (div. 2012)
- Issue: Prince Turki bin Faisal; Princess Sarah bint Faisal
Names
- Reema bint Bandar bin Sultan bin Abdulaziz Al Saud
- House: Al Saud
- Father: Bandar bin Sultan Al Saud
- Mother: Haifa bint Faisal Al Saud
- Education: George Washington University

Reema bint Bandar Al Saud (Arabic: ريما بنت بندر آل سعود; born 15 February 1975) is the Saudi Arabian ambassador to the United States, a position her father had previously held. Appointed by King Salman bin Abdulaziz, she presented her credentials on 8 July 2019 and took office on 23 February 2019—becoming the first woman ambassador in the country's history. She also holds the rank of minister. She has advocated for female empowerment and has worked to expand opportunities for Saudi women within the country.

== Early life and education ==
Reema bint Bandar was born in Riyadh in 1975. Her parents are Bandar bin Sultan and Haifa bint Faisal. Reema is the great-granddaughter of Ibn Saud, the founder of modern Saudi Arabia, on her maternal and paternal sides. Her maternal grandparents are King Faisal, the son of Ibn Saud, and Queen Iffat who was born to a Circassian mother and a Saudi father. Her paternal grandfather is former Crown Prince Sultan.

She is one of eight children. Two of her siblings also work in government: Khalid bin Bandar bin Sultan Al Saud was the Saudi Arabian ambassador to the United Kingdom and is currently an advisor to the Ministry of Foreign Affairs. Another brother, Faisal bin Bandar bin Sultan Al Saud, is the chairman of the Saudi Esports Federation. He is also vice chairman of gaming juggernaut Savvy Games Group.

Reema spent many years in the United States where her father Bandar was the ambassador from 1983 to 2005. She graduated from George Washington University with a Bachelor of Arts in museum studies. While Reema was earning her degree in museum studies, she interned at Institut du Monde Arabe in Paris and at the Sackler Gallery of Art in Washington, D.C. She also collaborated from a distance with a curator at the Field Museum in Chicago, and her mother's "Haifa Faisal Collection" of art was displayed there.

After graduation, she returned to Riyadh. She joined THNK School of Creative Leadership in 2014 as a participant of Class 5 2015.

In 2022, Reema received an honorary doctorate from Marymount University.

== Career ==
=== Private sector ===
Reema returned to Saudi Arabia in 2005. She co-founded Yibreen, a women's gym and spa, and later became CEO at Al Hama LLC, a luxury retail company. From 2007 to 2015, she was chief executive officer of Alfa International Company Limited, a multi-brand luxury retail that operated, among other businesses, the Harvey Nichols store in Riyadh.

As chief executive officer of the Harvey Nichols store in Riyadh, Reema oversaw the recruitment of women into the retail sector, working with the Ministry of Labor on policies to facilitate their employment. She established what was described as the Kingdom's first workplace nursery and commissioned a study on barriers facing women in the workplace.

In 2013, Reema founded Alf Khair, a social enterprise focused on expanding professional opportunities for Saudi women. One of its initiatives, 10KSA, promoted health awareness and resulted in the creation of the World's Largest Human Awareness Ribbon, which was recognised by the Guinness World Records.

In 2016, Reema left the private sector to become Vice President of Women’s Affairs at the Saudi General Sports Authority, where she worked on policies and programs relating to women and children. After a year in the role, she was appointed Deputy of Development and Planning. In 2018, she became President of the Mass Participation Federation, becoming the first woman to lead a multi-sports federation in Saudi Arabia. She was in that position until her appointment as Ambassador.

Reema is a member of The World Bank's advisory council for the Women Entrepreneurs Finance Initiative.

In 2021, she founded Catmosphere Foundation to support Panthera Corporation's work to preserve big cats. On 6 November 2021, the first awareness campaign "Catwalk" took place, a walkathon in several countries.

=== Public sector ===
As president of the Mass Participation Federation, Reema is the first woman to lead a multi-sports federation in the Kingdom, driving communities toward an active lifestyle.

In 2016, Reema was the Saudi General Sports Authority's (GSA) Deputy of Planning and Development, where she has led diversity and inclusion, the development of the Kingdom's sports economy, and strategic partnerships. In the very same year, she was appointed as vice president of women's affairs at the General Sports Authority (GSA). In 2017, she held the position of the president of the Saudi Federation for Community Sports.

Among the first achievements under Reema's mandate is the inclusion of physical education for girls in schools.

In 2017 Reema was awarded Sheikh Mohammed bin Rashid Al Maktoum Creative Sport Award in its ninth edition for her role played in the empowerment of women in the region through her spirit of entrepreneurship and philanthropy.

Reema is a member of the International Olympic Committee Women in Sports Commission and a member of the Saudi Arabian Olympic and Paralympic Committee. She is also a permanent representative to the (UNESCO). Reema is a member of the International Olympic Committee, on the Gender Equality, Diversity & Inclusion Commission, the Sustainability & Legacy Commission and the Coordination for the Games of the XXXV Olympiad Brisbane 2032 Commission. Reema is the Honorary President of the Saudi Special Olympics and a board member of the Saudi Sports for All Federation.

In October 2019, Reema sent Rosh Hashanah greetings to Jewish people in the United States for the Jewish new year. This message is the first time, according to NBC news, the Saudi embassy in Washington sent such a greeting to American Jews.

==== Inclusive employment advocacy ====
Reema has gained attention on the international stage as a leader in business innovation, specifically as a champion for women in the workplace. She was recognized as the Most Creative Person of the year in 2014 by Fast Company for "Inviting Women into the Workforce," and was featured on the Forbes lists of the 200 Most Powerful Arab Women and Most Powerful Arab Women in Saudi Arabia lists for 2014. She was also recognized by Foreign Policy Magazine as a Leading Global Thinker of 2014 in their "Moguls" category for her work helping women to "integrate their personal and professional lives" by creating hospitable opportunities for women to participate in the economy. Princess Reema was listed in the 'Top 100 most powerful Arabs' from 2018 to 2021 by Gulf Business.

Reema has noted that engaging women as active participants in the working economy is "evolution, not revolution," and empowering a woman with financial responsibility will encourage her to "explore more of the world for herself and become less dependent." She has also stated that Saudi Arabia "cannot have half of [the] population not working."

At Harvey Nichols Riyadh, Reema was responsible for hiring more women and introducing services such as childcare available to employees with young children, providing an opportunity for mothers to continue working and also provide for their children during the workday. She also began a program at Harvey Nichols that provides transportation stipends to women because the Kingdom's restrictions did not allow women to drive at that time, until September 2017 when the Saudi government decided to allow women to drive. These efforts, coupled with economic policies lowering the barriers for women to enter the workforce, have led to the store employing dozens of women today (as opposed to 2011, when only men worked there).

== Philanthropic work ==
Reema Alf Khair, a corporate social responsibility initiative, whose work included an active and vocal community of creative talent in Saudi Arabia and promoted their work internationally. Alf Khair also developed a retail academy, which provided training for Saudi women joining the workforce. Her work in this realm also included her role as an Advisory Board Member of the Saudi National Creative Initiative. In 2015, Princess Reema founded Alf Khair, a social enterprise seeking to empower professional growth and capital for Saudi women with a curriculum enabling economic self-sufficiency.

=== Breast cancer advocacy ===
Reema is a founding member of the Zahra Breast Cancer Awareness Association, based in Riyadh. The mission of the organization is to "increase and spread awareness among women across the country for early detection, prevention, and treatment of the disease, and cooperate with women diagnosed with breast cancer on a step-by-step basis for treatment and ultimate recovery." In 2015, the Zahra Breast Cancer Association set a Guinness World Record by creating the World's Largest Human Awareness Ribbon at Princess Noura University.

Reema's work with Zahra also includes organizing the world's largest human pink ribbon in 2010. This effort was recognized as the winner of the Holmes Report Golden Sabre Award for the Best Publicity Stunt Category and the Platinum Sabre Award for Best PR Programme.

In May 2012, in conjunction with the Zahra Breast Cancer Association, Reema led a group of Saudi women to the base camp of Mount Everest in a bid to raise awareness about breast cancer. This campaign was titled "A Woman’s Journey: Destination Mount Everest". The 11 climbers began their trek to camp located 5,364 meters above sea level on 7 May, completing their trek in 12 days.

== Personal life ==
Reema married Faisal bin Turki bin Nasser and has two children (a son, Turki; and a daughter, Sarah). They divorced in 2012.

According to Axios, Reema is a member of Dialog, a secret society founded by Peter Thiel and Auren Hoffman.

== Recognition and awards ==
- In 2015, Reema bint Bandar was selected by the World Economic Forum at Davos as a Young Global Leader.
- In 2014, she was named as Foreign Policy Magazine Global Thinker Mogul.
