= Laura Tyson =

American business academic

2nd Director of the National Economic Council
- In office February 21, 1995 – December 12, 1996
- President: Bill Clinton
- Preceded by: Robert Rubin
- Succeeded by: Gene Sperling

16th Chair of the Council of Economic Advisers
- In office February 5, 1993 – April 22, 1995
- President: Bill Clinton
- Preceded by: Michael Boskin
- Succeeded by: Joseph Stiglitz

Personal details
- Born: Laura D'Andrea; June 28, 1947 (age 79) Bayonne, New Jersey, U.S.
- Party: Democratic
- Education: Smith College (BA); Massachusetts Institute of Technology (MA, PhD)

Laura D'Andrea Tyson (born June 28, 1947) is an American economist and university administrator who is currently a Distinguished Professor of the Graduate School at the Haas School of Business of the University of California, Berkeley and a senior fellow at the Berggruen Institute. She served as the 16th Chair of the White House Council of Economic Advisers from 1993 to 1995 and 2nd Director of the National Economic Council from 1995 to 1996 under President Bill Clinton. Tyson was the first woman to hold each of those posts. She is the first of only two people to have served in both posts, the second being Kevin Hassett.

== Early life and education ==
Tyson was born Laura D'Andrea in New Jersey. Her father was Italian American and her mother was of Swedish and Dutch descent. Tyson graduated summa cum laude with a B.A. in Economics from Smith College in 1969 and earned her Ph.D. in Economics from the Massachusetts Institute of Technology in 1974. Her doctoral advisor was Evsey Domar. She joined the faculty of the economics department at Princeton University in 1974 and remained in the position until 1977 when she became a professor of economics at the University of California, Berkeley. She was appointed a professor of business administration in 1990.

== Career ==
On December 12, 1992, President-elect Bill Clinton announced his intention to nominate Tyson as Chairman of the President's Council of Economic Advisers. She was confirmed by the United States Senate in 1993 and served until her appointment as Director of the National Economic Council from 1995 to 1996. She was the first woman in both roles. During her time with the Clinton administration, Tyson was a spokesperson in favour of GATT, arguing with Sir James Goldsmith on Charlie Rose that American jobs would be increased by the trade agreement.

After leaving politics, Tyson returned to UC Berkeley, becoming Dean of the Haas School of Business from 1998 to 2001. She later served as Dean of London Business School from 2002 to 2006. She was the first woman to lead both institutions.

Tyson has been a member of the Council on Foreign Relations since 1987, a board director of Morgan Stanley since 1997, a board director of AT&T Inc. since 1999, and a board director of Eastman Kodak. She is a member of the Committee on Capital Markets Regulation. In December 2009 it was announced that Tyson would join CB Richard Ellis Board of Directors on March 4, 2010. Tyson also sits on the QFINANCE Strategic Advisory Board. Since 2019, she has served on the board of advisors for Angeleno Group, a private equity and venture capital firm focused on sustainable energy investments.

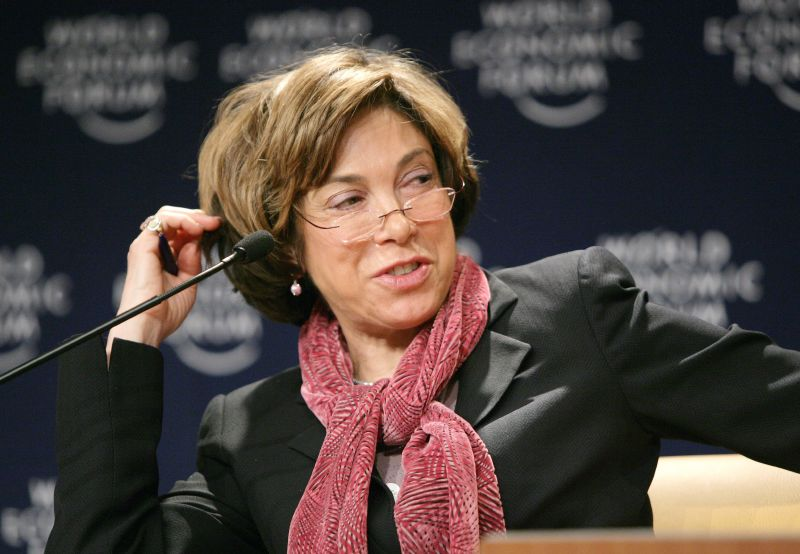
Tyson at the World Economic Forum in Davos, Switzerland, 2007

Tyson has published a number of books and articles on industrial competitiveness, trade, and the economies of Central Europe and their transitions to market systems.

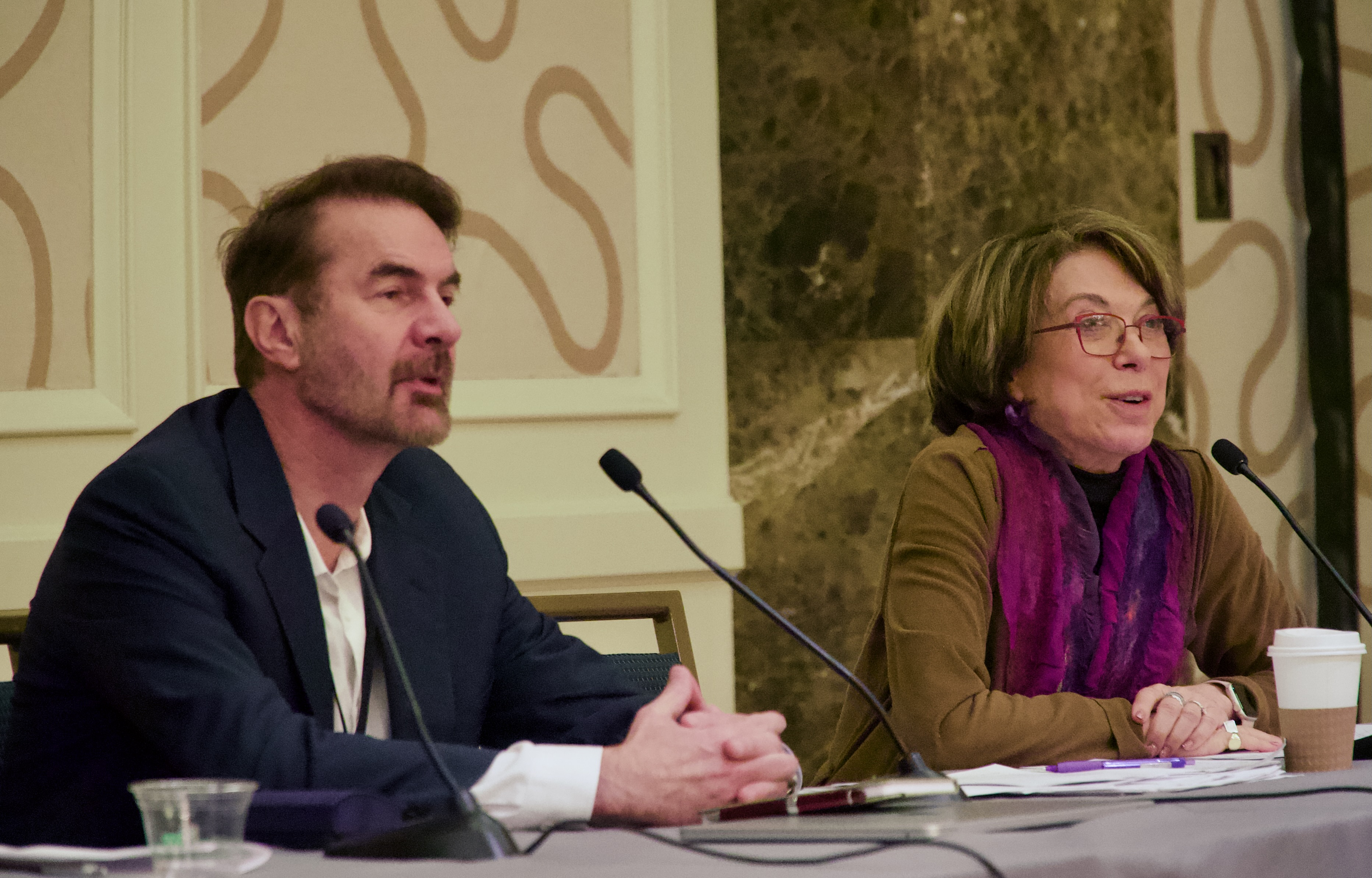
Erik Brynjolfsson and Tyson at AEA 2025 in San Francisco

An "Economic Viewpoint" columnist for BusinessWeek magazine, Tyson writes regularly about domestic and international economic policy matters in The Washington Post, The New York Times and other nationally and internationally syndicated newspapers and magazines.

In addition to her professorship at UC Berkeley, Tyson is also a member of the board of trustees at UC Berkeley's Blum Center for Developing Economies. The center is focused on finding solutions to address the crisis of extreme poverty and disease in the developing world.

Tyson joined Berkeley Research Group, LLC, an expert services advisory firm co-founded by David Teece, as a special advisor in 2010. Tyson had consulted for LECG, another expert advisory firm founded by Teece, from 1997 to 2001.

Since 2012, she has written monthly columns for international media organization Project Syndicate.

In November 2013, Tyson founded the Institute for Business and Social Impact at the University of California, Berkeley, Haas School of Business.

Political offices
Preceded by Michael Boskin	Chair of the Council of Economic Advisers; 1993–1995	Succeeded by Joseph Stiglitz
Preceded by Robert Rubin	Director of the National Economic Council; 1995–1996	Succeeded by Gene Sperling
Academic offices
Preceded by Raymond Miles	Dean of the Haas School of Business; 1998–2001	Succeeded by Tom Campbell
Preceded by John Quelch	Dean of the London Business School; 2002–2006	Succeeded by Robin Buchanan
