= Triangular Pyramid Factory =

- Type: Private
- Industry: Metal fabrication
- Founded: 2002
- Founder: Rashad Abedalqader
- Headquarters: Riyadh, Saudi Arabia
- Key people: Rashad Abedalqader, Basel Mohammad, Hamed Mohammad
- Website: Official website

Triangular Pyramid Factory is a metal fabrication and production company based in Riyadh, Saudi Arabia. The company was established in 2002 through Saudi Arabian General Investment Authority, as part of measures geared towards formalizing the process of economic liberalization. Triangular Pyramid factory is one of the largest manufacturers and suppliers of carbon steel, aluminium and stainless steel in Arabian Peninsula. The company has been involved in the construction of King Khalid International Airport and Marriott Courtyard, Riyadh.

== History ==
Triangular Pyramid Factory was founded in 2002 in Riyadh under Government of Saudi Arabia's investment scheme SAGIA. The company focuses on welding, manufacturing and fabrication of metals such as carbon steel, stainless steel, aluminium, wrought iron and galvanized steel.

== Overview ==
Triangular Pyramid Factory provides construction companies with custom fabricated metal products including metal hangar, metalized umbrellas, metal fencing and iron products. The company is Saudi Arabia's largest metal fabricator and have supplied products to international construction firms TAV Airports Holding, Sondos and Arabian Center. Triangular Pyramid Factory has helped in the renovation of King Khalid International Airport, an international airport in the city of Riyadh, the company has also provided supports and metal products during the construction of prominent architecture such as Marriott Courtyard, Fawaz Al Hokair Tower, Al Hamra Mall, Oyayna of Housing in Riyadh and Aloft Hotels.
