= Amr Al-Dabbagh =

Saudi Arabian businessman (born 1966)

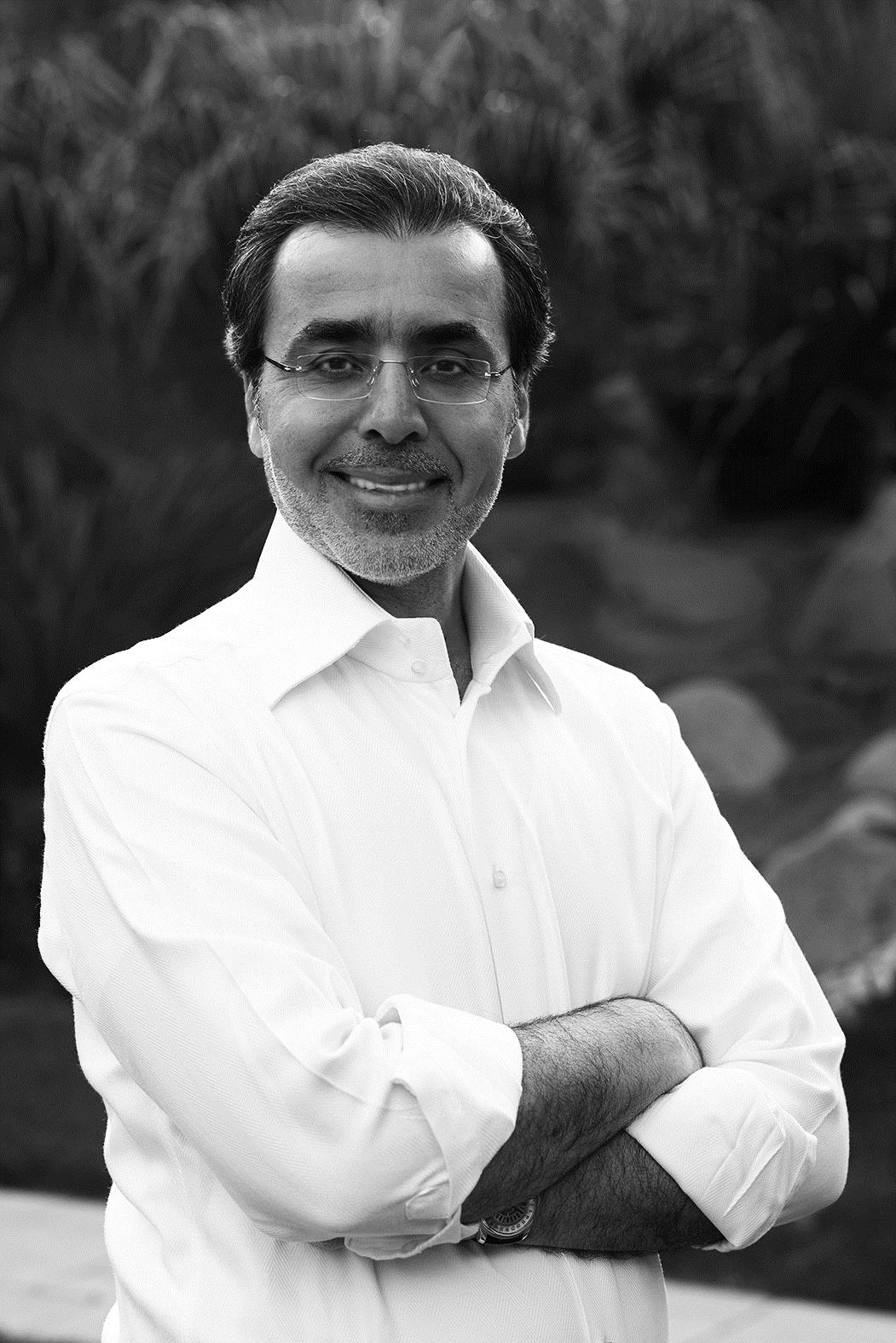
- Born: Amr Abdullah M.A. Al-Dabbagh; 1966 (age 59–60)
- Education: King Abdulaziz University
- Occupations: Businessman and 2nd Governor of SAGIA (2004–2012)
- Years active: 1984–present
- Relatives: Yasmeen Al-Dabbagh (daughter)

Amr Al-Dabbagh (Arabic: عمرو الدباغ; born 1966) is a Saudi businessman. He is chairman and CEO of Al-Dabbagh Group (ADG), a Saudi-based family conglomerate and headed the Saudi Arabian General Investment Authority (SAGIA) from 2004 to 2012. He has also held leadership roles across sectors including real estate, food production and has been involved in initiatives such as Philanthropy University and the Stars Foundation.

== Early life and education ==
He was born to Abdullah Al-Dabbagh, a former Saudi Minister for Agriculture in 1966.

He obtained his Bachelor of Business Administration from King Abdulaziz University.

== Career ==
He is chairman and CEO of Al-Dabbagh Group (ADG). The business is a family conglomerate founded in 1962 by his father, Abdullah Mohammed Ali Al-Dabbagh, the former Minister of Agriculture of Saudi Arabia.

He was governor of the Saudi Arabian General Investment Authority (SAGIA).

He was the founding Chairman of the think tank the Jeddah Economic Forum. He has been a board member of the Jeddah Chamber of Commerce & Industry.

He founded the UK based Stars Foundation that operated from 2001-2020.

In 2015, he created Philanthropy University which offers Massive Open Online Courses (MOOCs) to Global South non-profit leaders. The initiative was created with the collaboration of Institute for Business and Social Impact at the Haas School.

Al-Dabbagh has also held leadership roles in publicly listed companies. He serves as chairman of Tanmiah Food Company, where he was reappointed in 2025. In 2024, he was appointed chairman of Red Sea International.

== Corruption allegations ==
In November 2017, Al-Dabbagh was detained as part of what was called a wide-ranging "anti-corruption" purge that also ensnared Saudi Princes Alwaleed bin Talal and Miteb bin Abdullah.

On November 4, it was claimed that Dabbagh was called from Jeddah to the Ritz Carlton, a luxurious Riyadh hotel that had been converted into a makeshift prison for hundreds of Saudis suspected of corruption by the authorities, and was detained together with other prominent Saudi officials and businessmen.

Along with Dabbagh, Adel Fakeih, the former economy minister of the country, and Hani Khoja, were kept in custody.

Dabbagh continued to deny the charges against him. Until 20 December 2018, there was no specific charges against Al-Dabbagh, or any legal proceedings. He was released without charge on 23 January 2019.
