= King Faisal Air Academy =

Initial officer training establishment of the Royal Saudi Air Force

King Faisal Air Academy (KFAA)
- Active: 11 January 1968 – present
- Country: Saudi Arabia
- Branch: Royal Saudi Air Force
- Type: Training academy
- Role: Initial Officer training, Flight Training
- Ship's name: Riyadh Air Base
- Nickname: KFAA
- Mottos: الله ثم المليك والوطن (God then the King and the Homeland)

Commanders
- Ceremonial Chief: Lt Gen Prince Turki bin Bandar
- Commander: Hazem bin Abdul Rahman bin Ghoshyan

The King Faisal Air Academy (Arabic: كلية الملك فيصل الجوية) is a military officers' academy and flight school in Riyadh, Saudi Arabia founded in 1968.

== History ==
Founded on 11 January 1968, by Prince Sultan bin Abdul Aziz, Minister of Defense and Aviation, King Faisal Air Academy was officially opened on 20 May 1970 under the auspices of King Faisal bin Abdul Aziz.

The college has an internal and external scholarship system to study other aviation sciences such as aviation engineering, as well as accounting and law.

== Present ==
Training lasts for twenty-seven months, with bachelor's degrees in aeronautical sciences awarded to aircrew and engineering degrees awarded to graduates in technical specialties.

Programs include fighter pilot, weapon director, air traffic controller, and information technology training. Because most of the Royal Saudi Air Force's equipment is made by the United Kingdom and the United States, instruction is in English, and much of the faculty is British. Unlike other officer training schools, graduates of KFAA are trained as both pilots and officers simultaneously and are fully qualified for both flight and command duties upon graduation. Some graduates go on to further training with the United States Air Force at Columbus Air Force Base.
