= Institute for Business and Social Impact =

Institute for Business & Social Impact
- Founded: November 2013
- Website: Official website

The Institute for Business and Social Impact was founded by Laura Tyson in November 2013 at the University of California, Berkeley, Haas School of Business.

The institute currently houses The Center for Nonprofit and Public Leadership, The Center for Responsible Business, The Graduate Program in Health Management, and The Haas Global Social Venture Competition at the Haas School of Business.
