= Adel al-Jubeir =

Saudi diplomat and minister of state for foreign affairs (born 1962)

His Excellency Adel al-Jubeir
- عادل الجبير
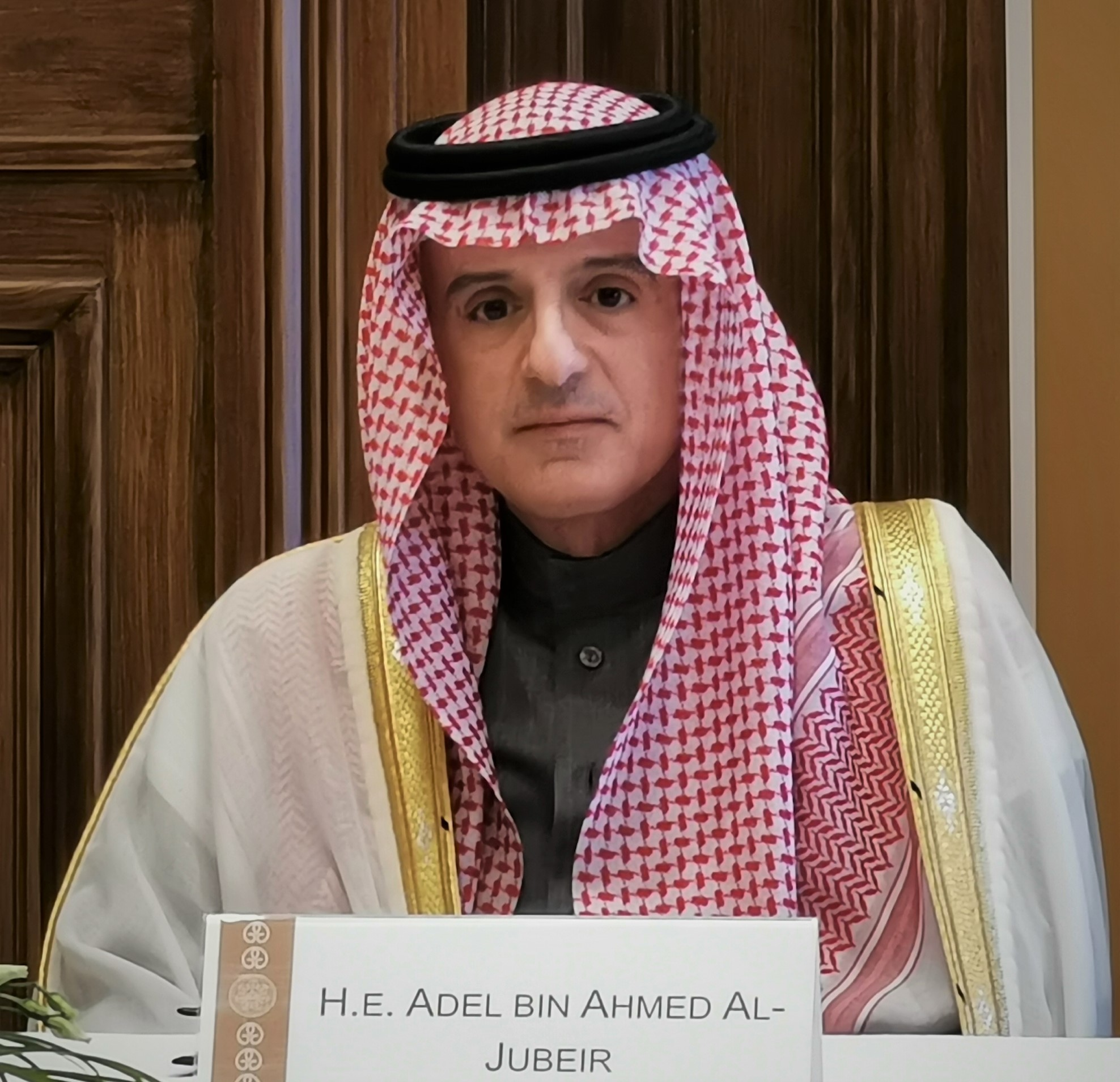
- Al-Jubeir in 2020

Saudi Arabia's Envoy for Climate Affairs
- Incumbent
- Assumed office 30 May 2022
- Monarch: Salman
- Prime Minister: Salman; Mohammed bin Salman
- Preceded by: Position established

Minister of State for Foreign Affairs
- Incumbent
- Assumed office 27 December 2018
- Monarch: Salman
- Prime Minister: Salman (2018–2022); Mohammad bin Salman (2022–present)
- Preceded by: Nizar Madani

Minister of Foreign Affairs
- In office 29 April 2015 – 27 December 2018
- Monarch: Salman
- Prime Minister: Salman
- Preceded by: Saud Al Faisal
- Succeeded by: Ibrahim Abdulaziz Al-Assaf

Saudi Ambassador to the United States
- In office 29 January 2007 – 28 April 2015
- Preceded by: Turki bin Faisal Al Saud
- Succeeded by: Abdullah bin Faisal bin Turki bin Abdullah Al Saud

Personal details
- Born: Adel bin Ahmed Al-Jubeir; 1 February 1962 (age 64) Al Majma'ah, Saudi Arabia
- Education: University of North Texas (BA); Georgetown University (MA)

Adel bin Ahmad al-Jubeir (Arabic: عادل بن أحمد الجبير; born 1 February 1962) is a Saudi diplomat serving as the Minister of State for Foreign Affairs since 2018. He also serves as a Member of the Council of Ministers of Saudi Arabia and has been the Climate Affairs Envoy since 2022. Notably, he is the second non-royal to hold the office of the Minister of State for Foreign Affairs, succeeding Ibrahim bin Abdullah Al Suwaiyel. Previously, al-Jubeir was the Saudi Ambassador to the United States from 2007 to 2015 and a foreign policy advisor to King Abdullah.

== Early life ==
Al-Jubeir was born in Al Majma'ah, Riyadh Province, Saudi Arabia. He attended schools in Saudi Arabia, Germany, Yemen, Lebanon and the U.S. He obtained a B.A. with highest honors in political science and economics from the University of North Texas in 1982, and an M.A. in international relations from Georgetown University in 1984. In 2006, he received an Honorary Doctorate in Humane Letters from the University of North Texas.

== Political career ==
In 1987, Al-Jubeir was appointed into the Saudi Diplomatic Service and posted to the Royal Embassy of Saudi Arabia in Washington, D.C., where he served as Special Assistant to then Ambassador Prince Bandar bin Sultan. In 1991, during the first Gulf War, Al-Jubeir first appeared to the world as a spokesman for the Saudi government. In 1990–91, he was part of the Saudi team that established the Joint Information Bureau at Dhahran, a city in Saudi Arabia's Eastern Province, during Operation Desert Shield/Desert Storm. He was a member of the Gulf Cooperation Council delegation to the Madrid Peace Conference in October 1991, and a member of the Saudi delegation to the Multilateral Arms Control Talks in Washington, D.C., in 1992. In December 1992, he was dispatched with the Armed Forces of Saudi Arabia to Somalia as part of Operation Restore Hope.

Al-Jubeir was a member of the Saudi Arabian delegation to the United Nations General Assembly, and was a visiting diplomatic fellow at the Council on Foreign Relations in New York City, 1994–95. During his tenure at the Saudi embassy, Al-Jubeir developed strong ties on Capitol Hill, in the Administration, the media and with major think tanks in Washington. In 2000, Al-Jubeir became Director of the Saudi Information and Congressional Affairs Office at the Royal Embassy of Saudi Arabia in Washington, D.C. In late 2000, he was named Foreign Affairs Advisor in the Crown Prince's Court. In August 2005, King Abdullah bin Abdulaziz appointed Al-Jubeir to the position of Advisor at the Royal Court.

Following the September 11 attacks, Al-Jubeir returned to the United States to address the many questions and criticisms that faced the Kingdom at that time. Al-Jubeir became the face of Saudi Arabia through hundreds of television appearances as well as other media interviews and visited more than 25 cities across the country where he gave talks to World Affairs Councils, universities, civic organizations, business institutions and other interested groups about current events and the state of Saudi/U.S. relations.

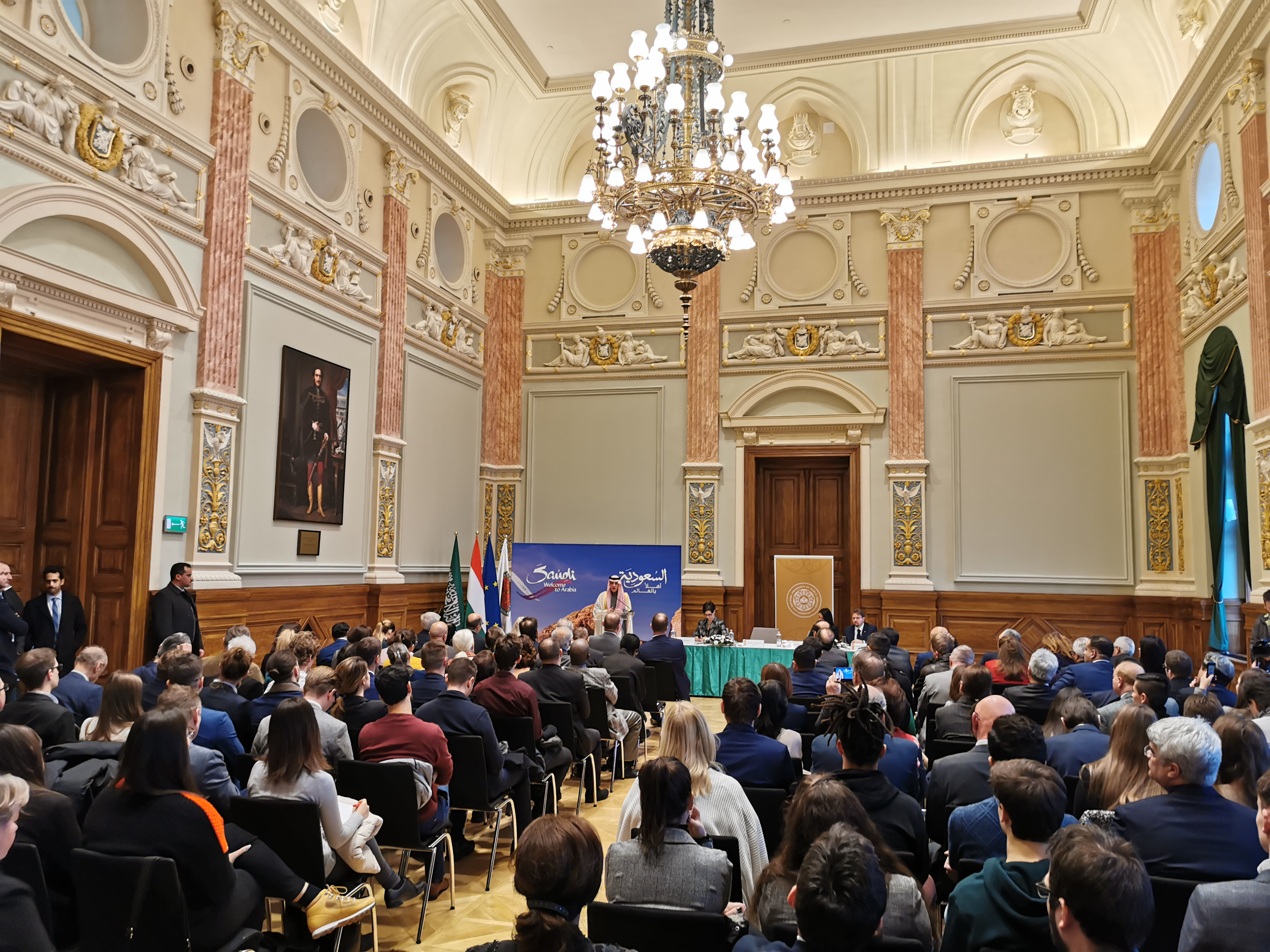
Adel al-Jubeir giving a lecture in Budapest

While on diplomatic mission in Budapest, Adel al-Jubeir gave a lecture on Saudi Foreign Policy and Reforms Of Vision 2030.

== Diplomatic career ==
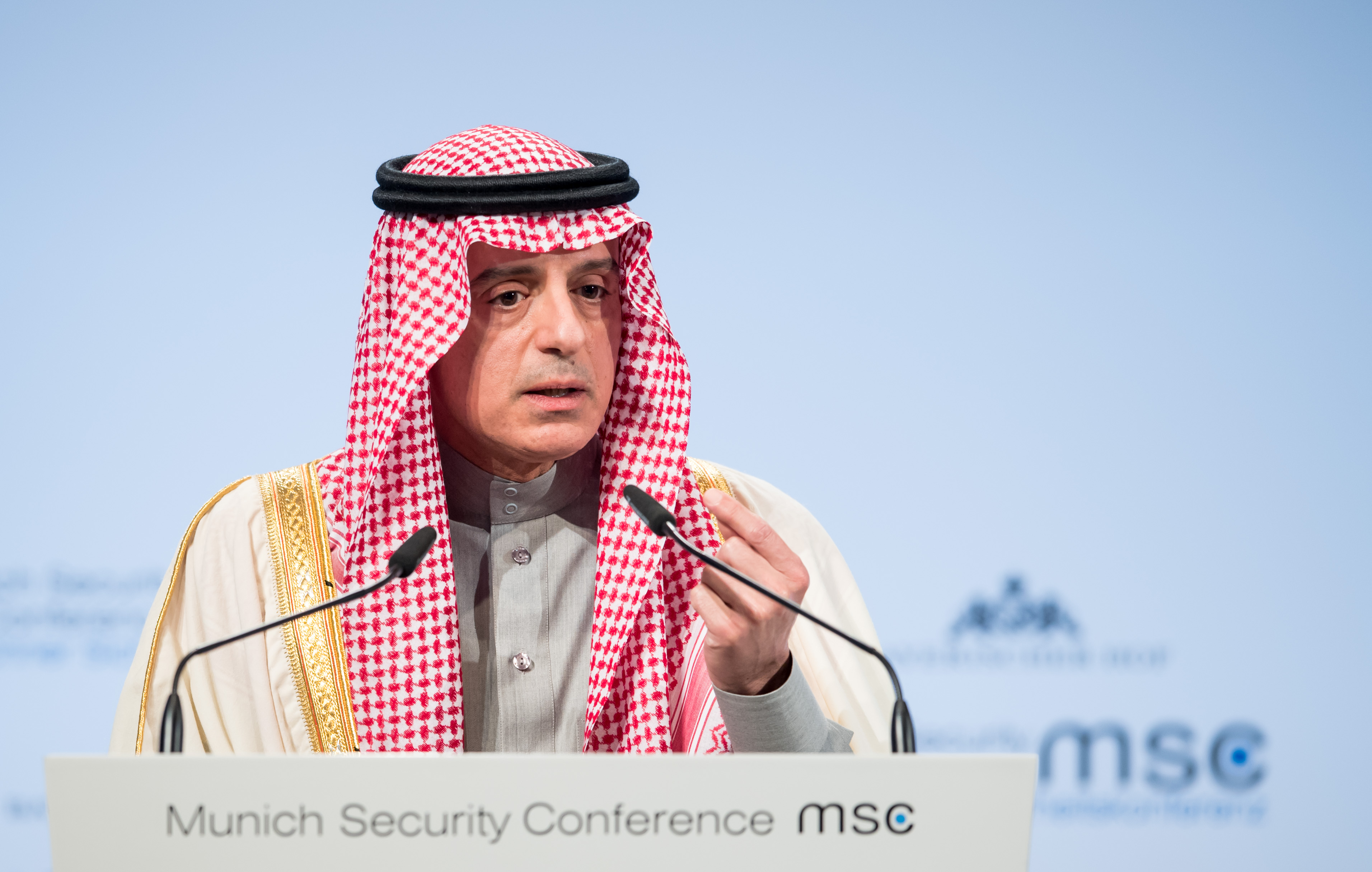
Al-Jubeir during the Munich Security Conference 2018

On 29 January 2007 Al-Jubeir was appointed as Saudi Ambassador to the United States of America with the rank of Minister. As ambassador, Al-Jubeir focused on strengthening the bilateral relationship by building ties across government departments in both countries. Another key area of focus was the welfare of Saudi citizens living in the United States. Other issues of focus included counter-terrorism, regional peace and security, bilateral trade, cultural exchange and interfaith dialogue. Prior to becoming ambassador, he was instrumental in establishing and maintaining the U.S.-Saudi Strategic Dialogue, which was initiated by King Abdullah and President Bush as a means to institutionalize relations between the two nations and deepen coordination on strategic, political and economic issues.

As Ambassador Al-Jubeir travelled frequently to the Kingdom for consultations with the King and other senior Saudi officials. He was regularly seen with King Abdullah in meetings with world leaders and accompanied King Abdullah on many state visits including Oman, China, India, Pakistan, Malaysia in 2006, Germany, Italy, Turkey, and Egypt in 2007, the G20 London Summit and Doha Arab Summit in 2009 and G20 Toronto Summit in 2010.

Ambassador Al-Jubeir was part of King Abdullah's delegation on his visit to the Vatican in November 2007, where King Abduallah met with Pope Benedict XVI, the first meeting between a Saudi monarch and a Pope. In July 2008, King Abdullah convened an interfaith conference in Madrid, Spain, bringing together major figures from Islam, Judaism, Christianity, Hinduism, Buddhism, Shintoism and Confucianism to reinforce the common values shared by their respective faiths.

In November 2007, Al-Jubeir joined Saudi Foreign Minister Prince Saud al-Faisal for the meeting of the Arab League Foreign Ministers in Cairo in preparation for the Annapolis Peace Conference. He was also a member of the Saudi delegation to the Annapolis Peace Conference in November 2007.

During Ambassador Al-Jubeir's tenure, Saudi Arabia and the U.S. signed a series of bilateral agreements in key areas including civil nuclear cooperation, enhanced security arrangements, reciprocal visa policies, health and medical services, science and technology cooperation, among others. The two countries also established two Joint Task Forces—one to combat terrorists, another to combat terror financing. Experts from both governments and militaries worked side-by-side, sharing real-time information about terror networks.

In October 2010, Saudi intelligence provided key information to American officials that foiled an attempted terrorist plot involving parcel bombs heading to the United States that originated in Yemen. The bombs were found and defused before reaching their intended targets. According to news reports, a double-agent in Yemen was the source of the tip-off.

Al-Jubeir enhanced the embassy's focus on its ties with the United States Congress through extensive meetings and briefings with members of Congress and staff as well as facilitating visits to the Kingdom. In the spring of 2007, Speaker of the House Nancy Pelosi visited the Kingdom with a Congressional delegation, the first visit by a sitting Speaker of the House. In addition, the tempo of visits by senior U.S. officials increased substantially during his tenure as ambassador, including two visits by President Bush, multiple visits by Vice President Dick Cheney and visits by President Obama in 2009 and 2014. Other visits included National Security Advisors James L. Jones and Thomas Donilon; Secretaries of State Hillary Clinton and John Kerry; Secretaries of Treasury Henry Paulson and Timothy Geithner; Secretary of Energy Steven Chu; Secretaries of Defense Robert Gates, Leon Panetta and Chuck Hagel; CENTCOM Commanders Generals David Petraeus, James Mattis and Lloyd J. Austin III; FBI Director Robert Mueller; Homeland Security Advisor John O. Brennan and Special Envoys George J. Mitchell, Dennis Ross, Richard Holbrooke and a large number of sub cabinet officials.

Visits to the United States by senior Saudi officials since 2007 have included two Heads of State visits by King Abdullah in November 2008 and July 2010. In addition, there were a number of visits by Foreign Minister Prince Saud Al-Faisal, then Minister of Defense now King Salman bin Abdulaziz, Minister of Interior Prince Muhammad bin Nayef, then Assistant to the Minister of Interior for Security Affairs now Second Deputy Prime Minister, Prince Muqrin bin Abdulaziz, Minister of Petroleum and Mineral Resources Ali Al-Naimi, Finance Minister Ibrahim Abdulaziz Al-Assaf, then Governor of the Saudi Arabian Monetary Agency, Mohammed al-Jasser, then Minister of Commerce Abdullah Alireza, President of the Saudi Commission for Tourism and Antiquities Prince Sultan bin Salman and Minister of Higher Education Dr. Khalid Al-Angary.

In addition to visits by government officials, there have been numerous trade delegations to and from both countries as well as academic exchanges, including visits by the head of the Human Rights Committee and members of the Majlis Al-Shura (Consultative Council).

These visits reflect the breadth and depth of the relationship between the United States and Saudi Arabia.

Ambassador al-Jubeir served as the Escorting Minister for Presidents George W. Bush and Barack Obama on their respective visits to the Kingdom.

On 3 June 2009, U.S. President Barack Obama traveled to Riyadh, Saudi Arabia on a two-day official visit to Saudi Arabia. President Obama was received by King Abdullah, Second Deputy Prime Minister Prince Nayef bin Abdulaziz and Ambassador Al-Jubeir at King Khalid International Airport.

During his visit to Saudi Arabia, President Obama stated that he chose Saudi Arabia as the first stop on his Middle East tour because the Kingdom is a key ally and the cradle of Islam. The President and King Abdullah met and held extensive bilateral talks at the King's ranch in al-Janadriyah on the outskirts of Riyadh. During their discussions, the two leaders focused on regional and international developments and Saudi-U.S. bilateral relations. King Abdullah presented President Obama with the Collar of Abdulaziz Al Saud, the Kingdom's highest award bestowed upon heads of state.

On 29 June 2010, Ambassador Al-Jubeir attended a meeting between King Abdullah and U.S. President Barack Obama in Washington, D.C. The two held on talks on a wide range of issues of mutual interest and common concern.

On 8 January 2011, Ambassador Al-Jubeir attended a meeting in New York between King Abdullah and U.S. Secretary of State Hillary Clinton and former U.S. President Bill Clinton as well as meetings between the King and French President Nicolas Sarkozy and United Nations Secretary-General Ban Ki-moon.

In 2007, he headed the Kingdom's delegation to the Law of the Seas Conference at the United Nations. In 2009, he met with UN Secretary-General Ban Ki-moon to discuss the ongoing situation in Darfur and in July 2011, he led the Saudi delegation to the U.N. High Level Meeting on Youth.

== Developments during tenure as ambassador ==
In 2012, the U.S. Embassy and Consulates in the Kingdom issued more than 90,000 visas to Saudis. The Saudi Embassy in Washington and Consulates in the U.S. issued more than 70,000 visas. These are historically high numbers. As a result of an agreement reached in May 2008, the two countries agreed to issue five-year multiple-entry visas to citizens of both countries. In May 2013, Saudi Arabia and the United States signed a bilateral agreement for air services aimed at implementing an open skies policy between the two countries. As a consequence, American carriers can expand services into Saudi Arabia and Saudi Arabian Airlines can increase the frequency of its flights to the U.S.

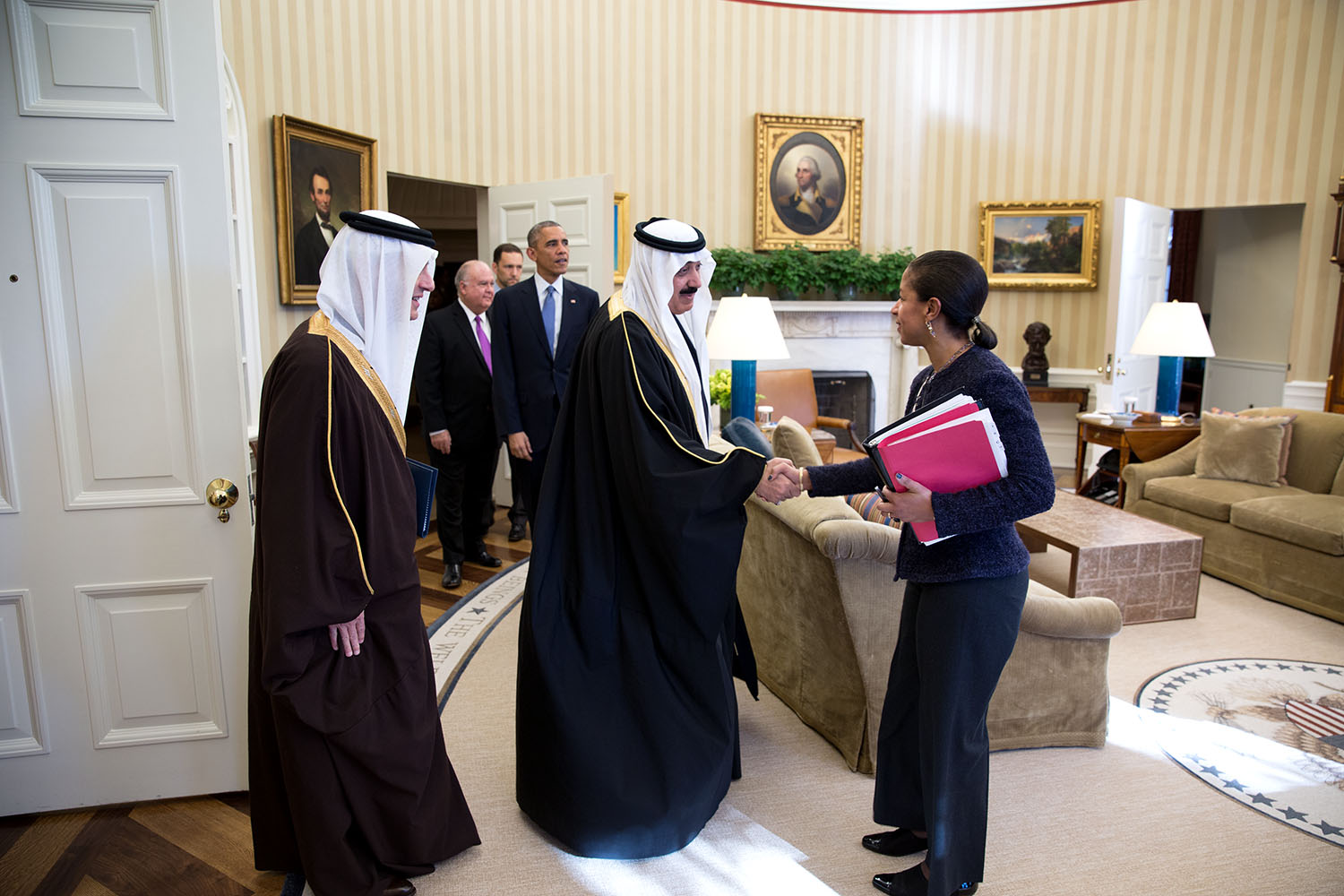
National Security Advisor Susan Rice greets Prince Mutaib and Ambassador Al-Jubeir, November 2014

Former U.S. Ambassador to Saudi Arabia, James B. Smith stated, "Offering new types of visas to foreign scientists and experts, as well as for student exchanges in scientific fields, opens doors for the people of Saudi Arabia to learn from other countries and for the world to learn from and about Saudi Arabia."

Saudi Arabia is the 10th largest trading partner of the United States. Investments between the two countries are also at record numbers. The United States is the number one source of Foreign Direct Investment (FDI) in Saudi Arabia. Strategic partnerships between Saudi Arabia and the U.S. continue to flourish. In 2010, Alcoa and Saudi Ma'aden signed a contract worth approximately $15 billion to build the world's largest aluminum refinery and smelter complex in the Kingdom. In 2011, Saudi Aramco and Dow Chemical Company approved the formation of a joint venture to build and operate a world-scale, fully integrated chemical complex in Jubail Industrial City, valued at $20 billion. In 2013, the Saudi government Public Investment fund signed a management contract with Fluor for the $7 billion Riyadh–Jeddah railway project. Also in 2013, a Bechtel led consortium was selected for a multibillion-dollar rail project of the Riyadh Metro network. Saudi Arabia is also a large investor in the U.S. economy.

Since the beginning of the conflict in Yemen in 2015, the Saudi-led coalition provided billions of dollars in humanitarian aid to the country, while pursuing a military agenda against the Houthi rebellion. As of 2018, the Saudi-led coalition has given over $3 billion in humanitarian assistance.

=== Arms transfers ===
In 2008, the Kingdom secured sophisticated weapon systems, which include the Joint Direct Attack Munitions. In December 2011, the U.S. and Saudi Arabia finalized defense packages that included F-15 fighter aircraft and upgrades for 70 existing aircraft, as well as munitions, spare parts, training, maintenance and logistics to Saudi Arabia. The sale was worth $29.4 billion.

== Foreign minister ==
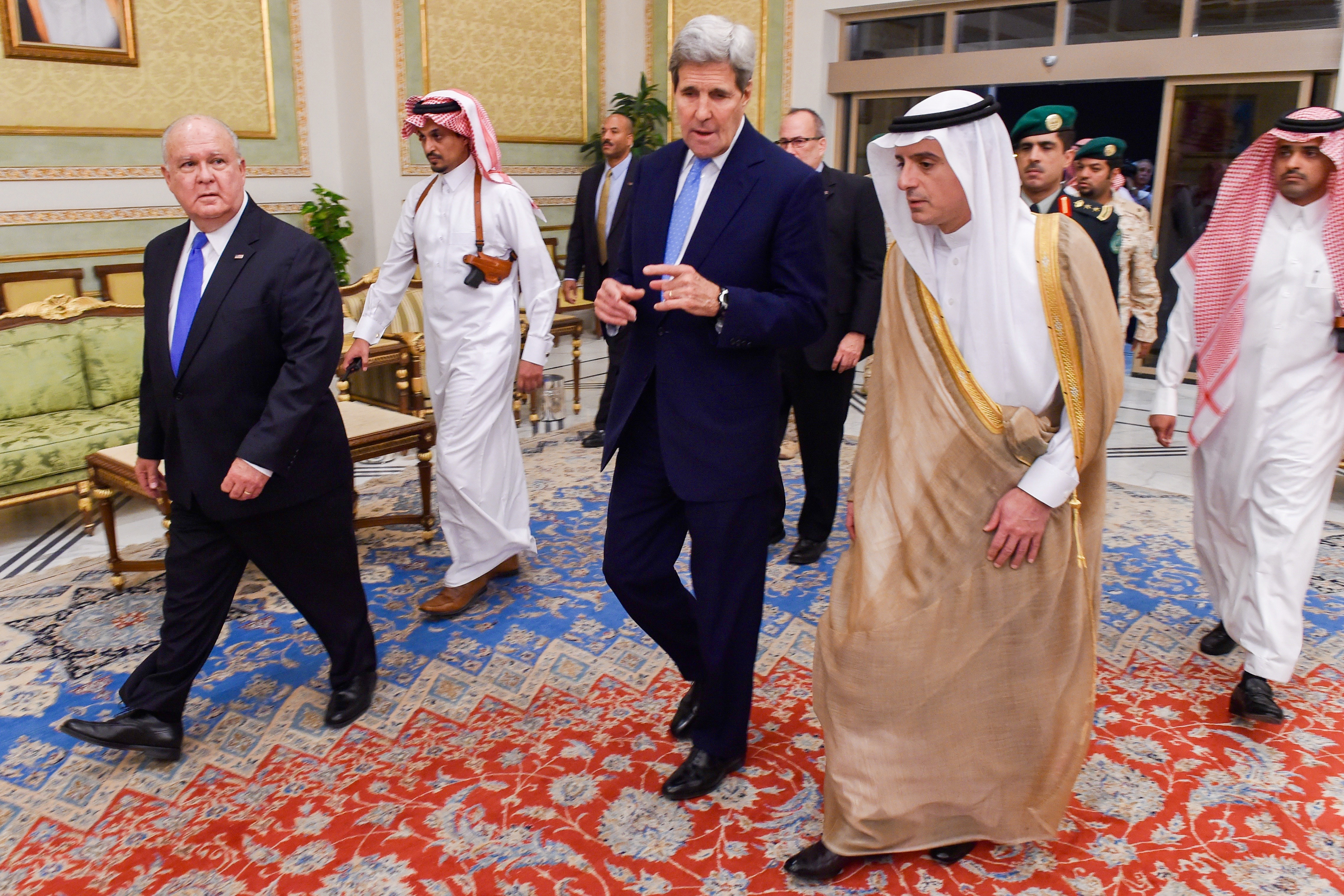
With John Kerry, United States Secretary of State, in Riyadh on October 24, 2015

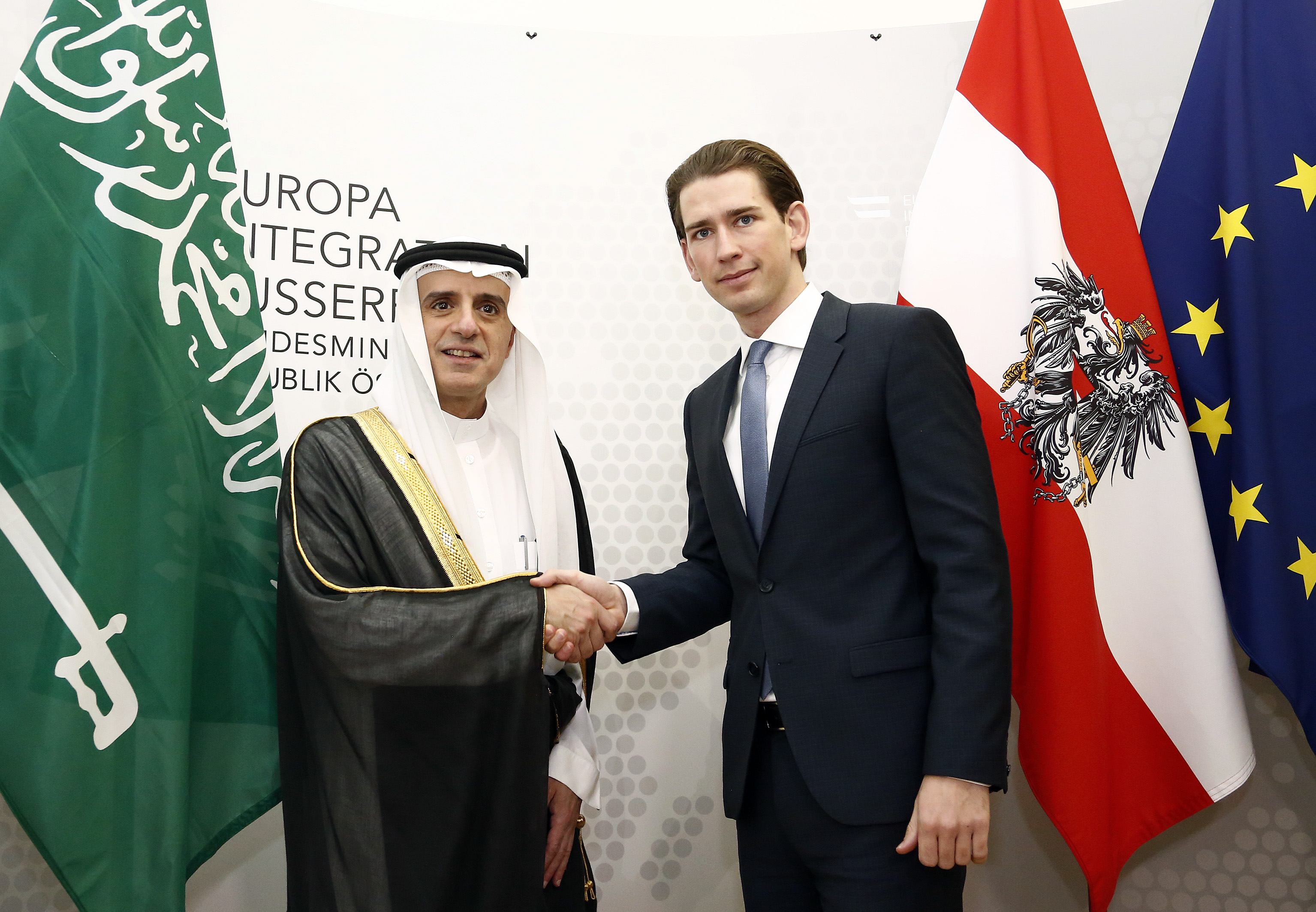
With Sebastian Kurz in 2015

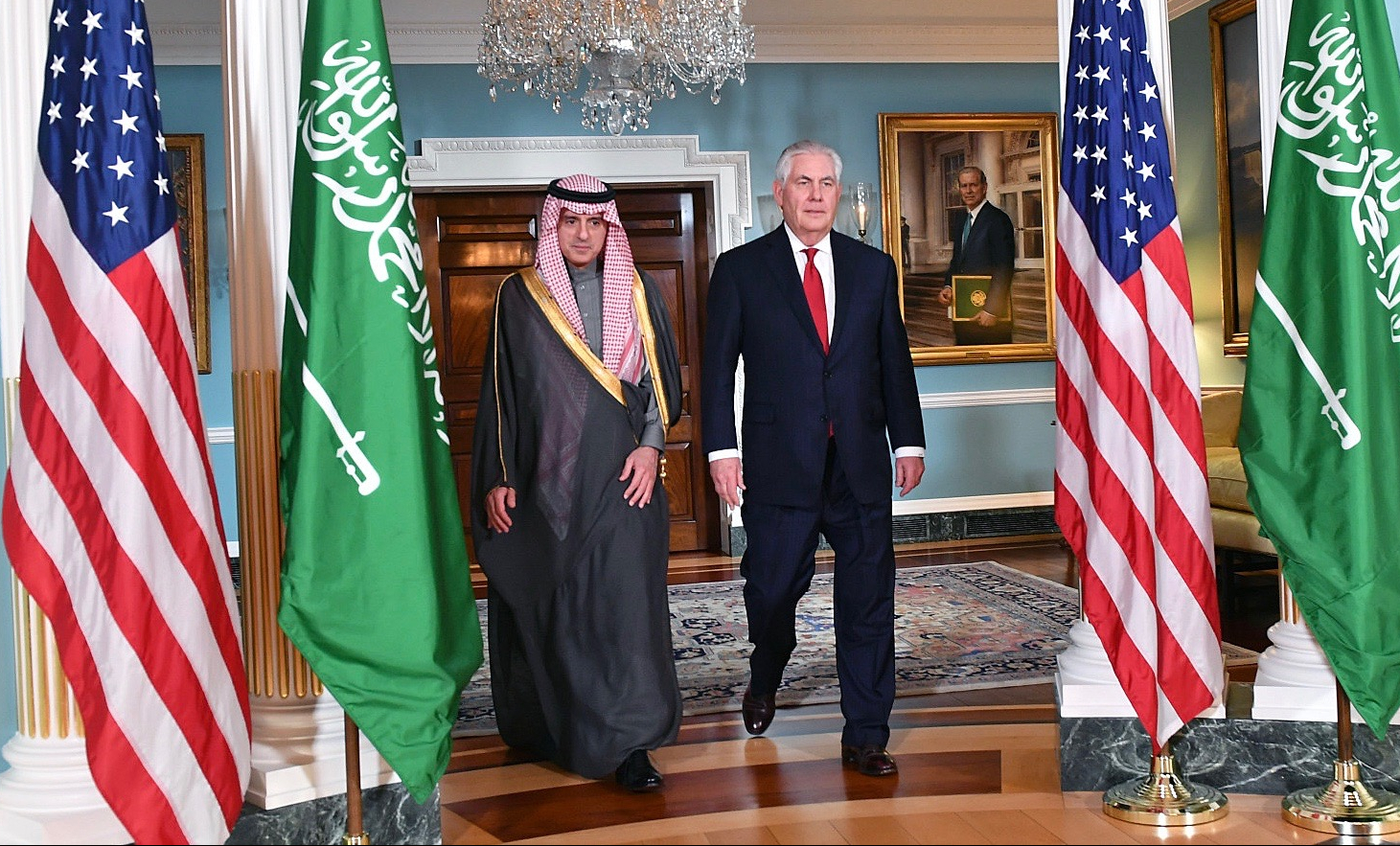
With U.S. Secretary of State Rex Tillerson, in Washington, D.C., on January 12, 2018

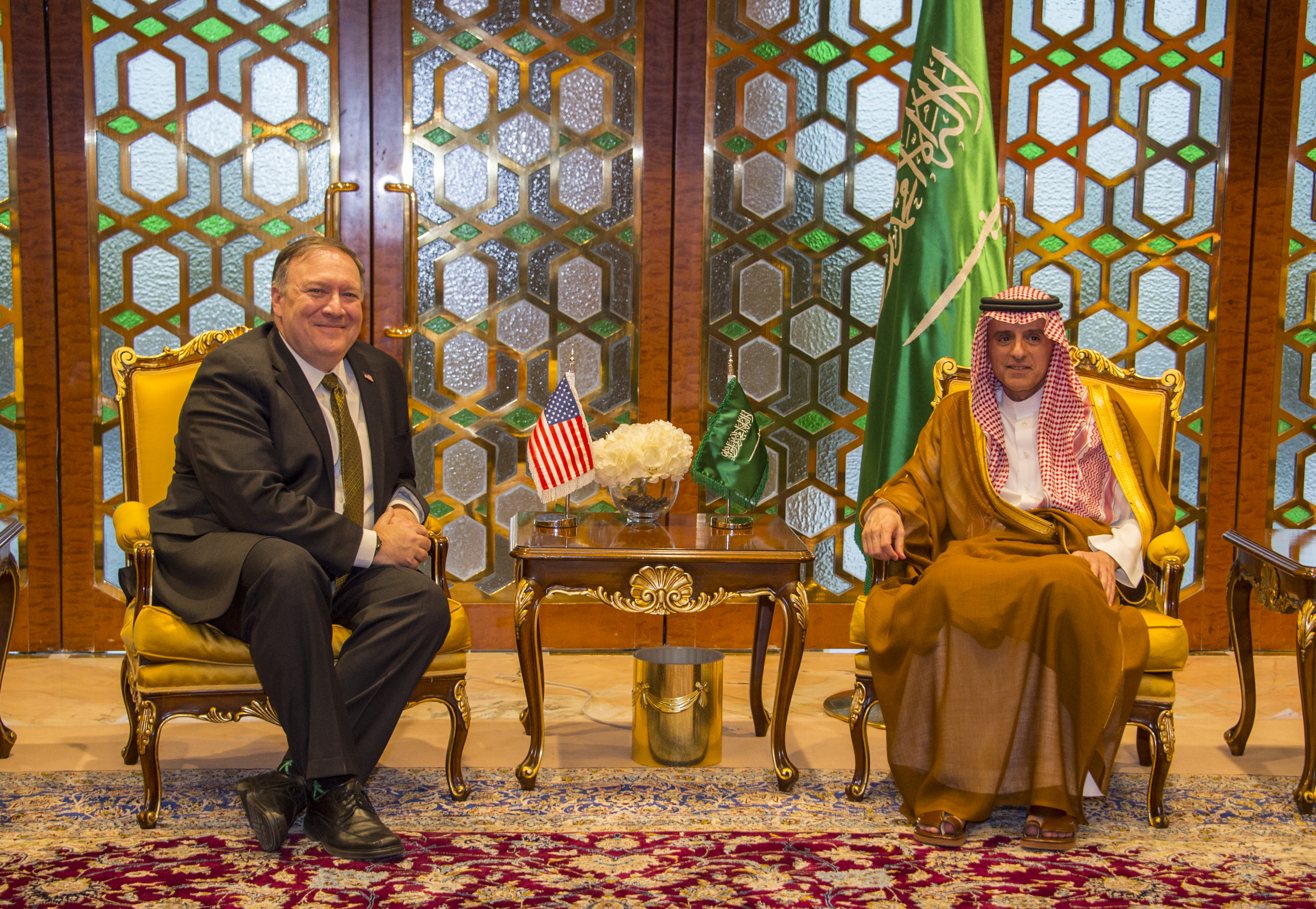
With U.S. Secretary of State Mike Pompeo, in Riyadh on April 28, 2018

In April 2015, he was appointed as foreign minister by King Salman of Saudi Arabia. He is the second person from outside the House of Saud to hold the position.

=== Saudi–Iranian tensions ===
Speaking on the nuclear program of Iran, al Jubeir said the Joint Comprehensive Plan of Action appeared to have the provisions needed to curtail Iran's ability to obtain a nuclear weapon. Adel al-Jubeir told reporters the kingdom was reassured by Washington while consultations continued about the deal, which he said stipulated effective inspections, and the possibility of snap-back sanctions if Iran violated the agreement. "We are currently in talks with the American government regarding these details, but it (the deal) generally seems to have achieved these objectives," said al-Jubeir, in Washington in July 2015.

In November 2017, Al-Jubeir called for sanctions on Iran for its support of terrorism and for violating the ballistic missile resolutions of the United Nations.

On 14 February 2019, at a conference in Warsaw, Al-Jubeir argued that Iran's "evil behavior" in the Middle East makes Israeli-Palestinian peace impossible to achieve. Al-Jubeir said that any attempt to be nice to Iran encourages Iran to behave worse. Al-Jubeir was critical of the nuclear deal with Iran. He worried that in ten years, "Iran ends up with a nuclear weapon — it is theoretically capable of doing one very quickly because [there are] no limits on enrichment — who is going to suffer? We are.”

=== Russian involvement in Syria ===
Following the Russian intervention in Syria in support of Syrian president Bashar al-Assad in 2015, al-Jubeir declared: “There is no future for Assad in Syria”. He spelled out that if the Syrian president did not step down as part of a political transition, his country would embrace a military option, “which also would end with the removal of Bashar al-Assad from power”. In February 2018, Al-Jubeir came out in favor of a draft UN resolution by France, the United States, and the United Kingdom which would condemn Iran for allowing ballistic missiles into the hands of Houthi rebels in Yemen.

=== Removal of Assad ===
"Bashar al-Assad will leave—have no doubt about it," al-Jubeir told CNN in February 2016. "He will either leave by a political process or he will be removed by force." Saudi Arabia has sent troops and fighter jets to a Turkish military base ahead of a possible ground invasion of Syria. Jubeir said Saudi Arabia was prepared to contribute ground troops to the fight in Syria, but only as part of a US-led coalition. He added: "We will push as much as we can to ensure that the political process works. But if that doesn't work, it will be because of the obstinance of the Syrian regime and that of its allies. "And should that prove to be the case, then it becomes clear that there is no option to remove Bashar al-Assad except by force."

On October 30, 2015, Saudi Arabia took part in the Syria Talks in Vienna to find a solution to the Syrian Civil War. Al-Jubeir used this opportunity to rebuke Iranian influence in Syria. He unsuccessfully tried to set conditions for the removal of Assad and the removal of Iranian troops from Syria. The talks eventually resulted in a final nine-point declaration signed off by all participants, which established a framework for continuing diplomatic peace efforts for the Syrian Civil War. In August 2017, Al-Jubeir reaffirmed this position, stating that the Kingdom supported an international agreement for the end of hostilities in the Syrian conflict, and that Assad should have no role in the transition to a peacetime government.

In August 2017, al-Jubeir informed the Syrian opposition that Saudi Arabia was disengaging from them.

=== Saudi Arabia's intervention in Yemen ===
In September 2016, al-Jubeir said that the United Kingdom, Saudi Arabia's close ally, must continue to support Saudi Arabia's military intervention in Yemen, saying: "Saudi Arabia is fighting a legitimate war. We did not start this: the Iranian-backed Houthis started this. We have a situation where many of the claims being made about civilian casualties are not accurate. ... many of the schools and hospitals that have been hit were no longer being used as schools and hospitals but as military centres by the Houthis." Regarding the Yemen crisis, Al-Jubeir called it a tragedy and reminded that the Kingdom was the world's largest donor of humanitarian assistance to Yemen. On January 22, 2018, he announced another influx of aid totaling over $1 billion, and re-established his country's commitment to finding peace in Yemen in cooperation with the United Nations.

=== Diplomatic dispute with Canada ===
In August 2018, Canada called for the immediate release of Saudi blogger Raif Badawi and his sister Samar. In response to Canada's criticism, Saudi Arabia expelled Canada's ambassador, and froze trade with Canada. Al-Jubeir said "Canada made a mistake, and the onus is on them to remedy, we don’t interfere in Canada, and we don’t get involved in their domestic policies. They did with ours, and it’s on them to fix it."

=== Demotion to Minister of State ===
In December 2018, al-Jubeir was demoted from his position as Minister of Foreign Affairs to Minister of State for Foreign Affairs. This was done in the wake of the Assassination of Jamal Khashoggi, in an apparent reshuffle of government officials by King Salman of Saudi Arabia. Al-Jubeir was seen as a fierce defender of Saudi's royal family following the assassination and was the first Saudi official to state publicly that Khashoggi was murdered by "rogue elements" of the Saudi government. Although it is not likely that al-Jubeir had any prior knowledge of the assassination, the crime happened on the grounds of a Saudi consulate and as Minister of Foreign Affairs, he was thereby responsible to a certain degree hence his demotion to the Minister of State.

== Assassination attempt ==
United States officials alleged on October 11, 2011, there was a plot tied to the Iranian government to assassinate Adel al-Jubeir in the United States. The plot was referred to as the "Iran assassination plot" or the "Iran terror plot" in the media, while the Federal Bureau of Investigation named the case "Operation Red Coalition".

== Honors ==
- 2002 – Person of the Week by Time
- 2006 – Alumnus Award from the University of North Texas
- 2006 – Honorary Doctor Degree in Humane Letters from the University of North Texas
- 2007 – Commendatore a Sue Eccellenza from Giorgio Napolitano, the then-President of Italy
- 2011 – Diplomatic Achievement Award from the National Council on U.S.-Arab Relations

== Personal life ==
Adel Al-Jubeir is married to Farah Al-Fayez, and is step-father to her twin daughters by her deceased husband. They also have two sons together.

Political offices
Preceded by Turki bin Faisal Al Saud	Saudi Ambassador to the United States; 2007–2015	Succeeded by Abdullah bin Faisal Al Saud
Political offices
Preceded by Saud bin Faisal bin Abdulaziz Al Saud	Minister of Foreign Affairs; 2015–2018	Succeeded by Ibrahim Abdulaziz Al-Assaf
