= Ibrahim bin Abdullah Al-Suweil =

Saudi Arabian government official and major general

Sheikh Ibrahim bin Abdullah Al-Suweil
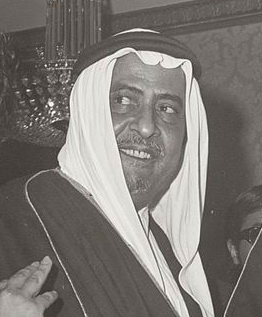
- Al Sowayel in 1974

Ambassador of Saudi Arabia to the United States
- In office 18 September 1964 – 1975
- Monarch: Faisal
- Preceded by: Abdallah Al-Khayyaal
- Succeeded by: Ali Alireza

Minister of Agriculture of Saudi Arabia
- In office 31 October 1962 – 29 August 1964
- Monarch: Saud
- Prime Minister: Faisal bin Abdulaziz Al Saud
- Preceded by: Abdul Rahman bin Sulaiman Al Sheikh
- Succeeded by: Hassan Al Mishari

Minister of Foreign Affairs of Saudi Arabia
- In office 22 December 1960 – 16 March 1962
- Monarch: Saud
- Prime Minister: King Saud
- Preceded by: Faisal bin Abdulaziz Al Saud
- Succeeded by: Faisal bin Abdulaziz Al Saud

Ambassador of Saudi Arabia to Iraq
- In office 1958–1960
- Monarch: Saud

Personal details
- Born: 1916 Unaizah, Emirate of Nejd and Hasa
- Died: 21 May 1977 (aged 60–61) Riyadh, Riyadh Region, Saudi Arabia
- Parent: Sheikh Abdullah bin Abdulaziz Al Sowayel
- Occupation: Politician; diplomat; teacher; political advisor

Military service
- Allegiance: Saudi Arabia
- Branch: Saudi Arabian Army
- Rank: Major general

Sheikh Ibrahim bin Abdullah bin Abdulaziz bin Abdullah Al Suwaiyel (Arabic: الشيخ إبراهيم بن عبد الله بن عبد العزيز بن عبد الله السويّل Ash-Sheikh Ibrāhīm bin ʿAbdullāh bin ʿAbdulʿazīz bin ʿAbdullāh Al Suwaiyel; 1916 – 21 May 1977) was a Saudi Arabian statesman, diplomat, and military officer who served as the Saudi Arabian minister of foreign affairs from 1960 to 1962. Appointed on 22 December 1960 by King Saud, he succeeded the future king Faisal bin Abdulaziz Al Saud and was succeeded by him again on 16 March 1961. He was noted for being the first non-royal to hold the position of foreign minister. He also served as the Saudi Arabian ambassador to both the United States and Iraq, as the minister of agriculture, and later as a member of the Council of Ministers and an advisor to the Royal Court.

== Early life and education ==
Al Sowayel was born in Unaizah, Al Qassim Province. His father was Sheikh Abdullah bin Abdulaziz Al Sowayel, an imam at a Unaizah mosque. He graduated from Cairo University, and he was the first Najdi person to attend a university.

== Career ==
=== Early career ===
Al Sowayel began his career teaching at a mission school in Mecca, before joining the diplomatic corps of the ministry of foreign affairs. He later served as a political advisor to King Saud, and a diplomat at the Saudi embassy in Cairo, Egypt. From 1958 to 1960, before being appointed foreign minister, he was the Ambassador of Saudi Arabia to Iraq.

=== Minister of Foreign Affairs ===
Al Suwaiyel was appointed minister of foreign affairs by King Saud, and took office on 22 December 1960. His predecessor was Faisal bin Abdulaziz Al Saud (later King Faisal), who was a close friend of Al Suwaiyel. With Faisal having been responsible for the Saudi domains' foreign policy since 1930 (two years before the proclamation of the Kingdom of Saudi Arabia), Al Suwaiyel became the country's second foreign minister, and the first minister who was not a member of the Saudi royal family. Al Suwaiyel held the office of foreign minister briefly, for less than two years, before returning it back to Faisal, whom he had asked to succeed him. He left office on 16 March 1962. During his time in office he attended the 1st Summit of the Non-Aligned Movement in Belgrade, FPR Yugoslavia making Saudi Arabia one of the founding members of the Non-Aligned Movement.

=== Later career ===
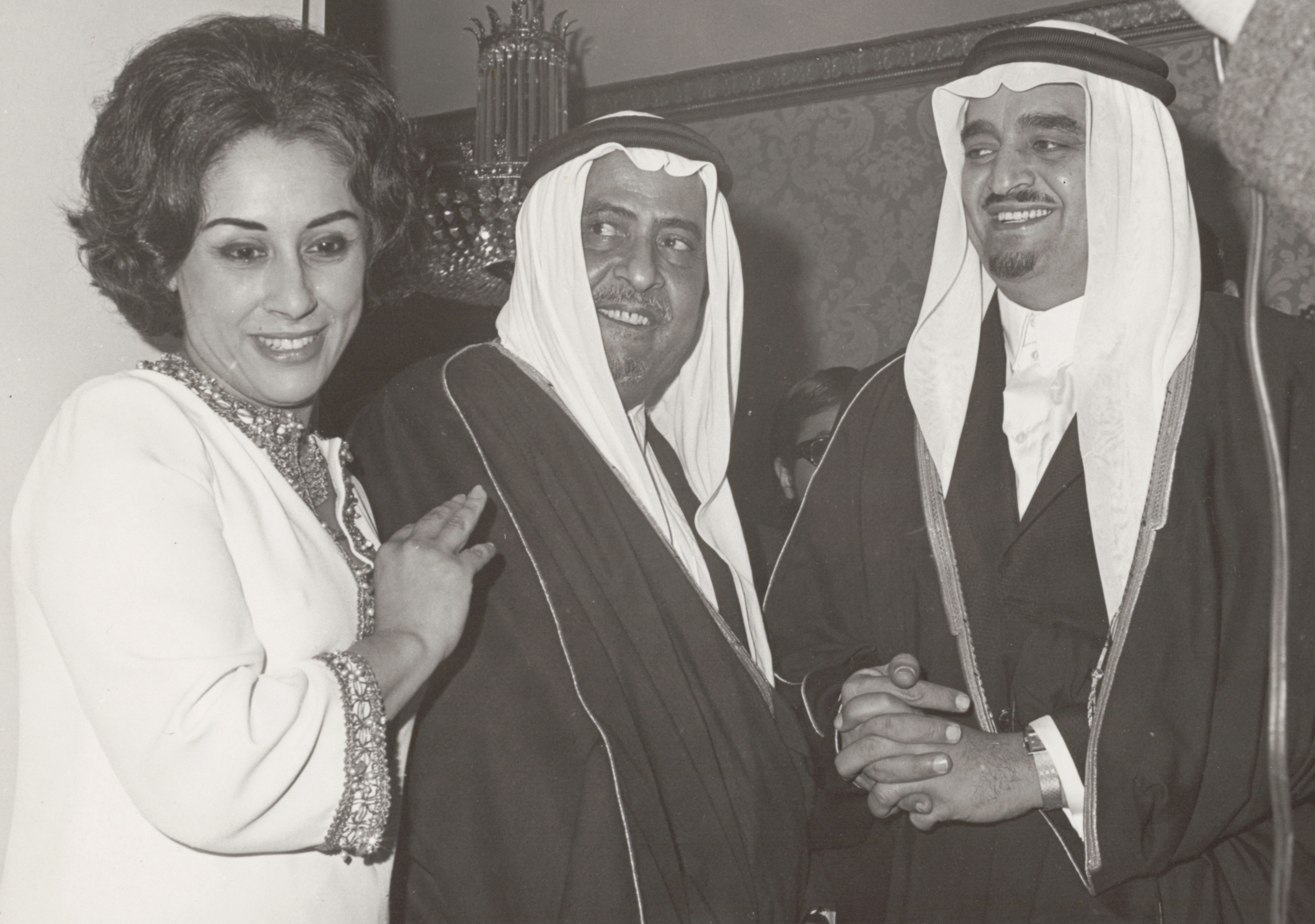
Ibrahim Al Suwaiyel and his wife with Saudi interior minister (and crown prince) Fahd bin Abdulaziz, 1974

On 31 October 1962, Al Suwaiyel took office as the minister of agriculture, serving until 29 August 1964. When Faisal became the king, Al Suwaiyel was appointed ambassador to the United States, serving until King Faisal's assassination in 1975. In June 1974 during an informal conversation between United States Secretary of State Henry Kissinger and senior Saudi officials, including Crown Prince Khalid, Prince Fahd, Prince Sultan and Prince Musaid Kissinger stated that Al Suwaiyel was very devoted to Saudi Arabia.

Following the reign of King Khalid Al Suwaiyel left his ambassadorship and returned to Riyadh to help aide the new monarch. From 1975 until his death in 1977, he served as an advisor to the Saudi Royal Court and as a member of the Council of Ministers.

== Death ==
Al Suwaiyel died of complications from emphysema at dawn on 21 May 1977 in Riyadh.
