= Ahmed bin Fahd Al Saud =

Saudi royal and government official (born 1986)

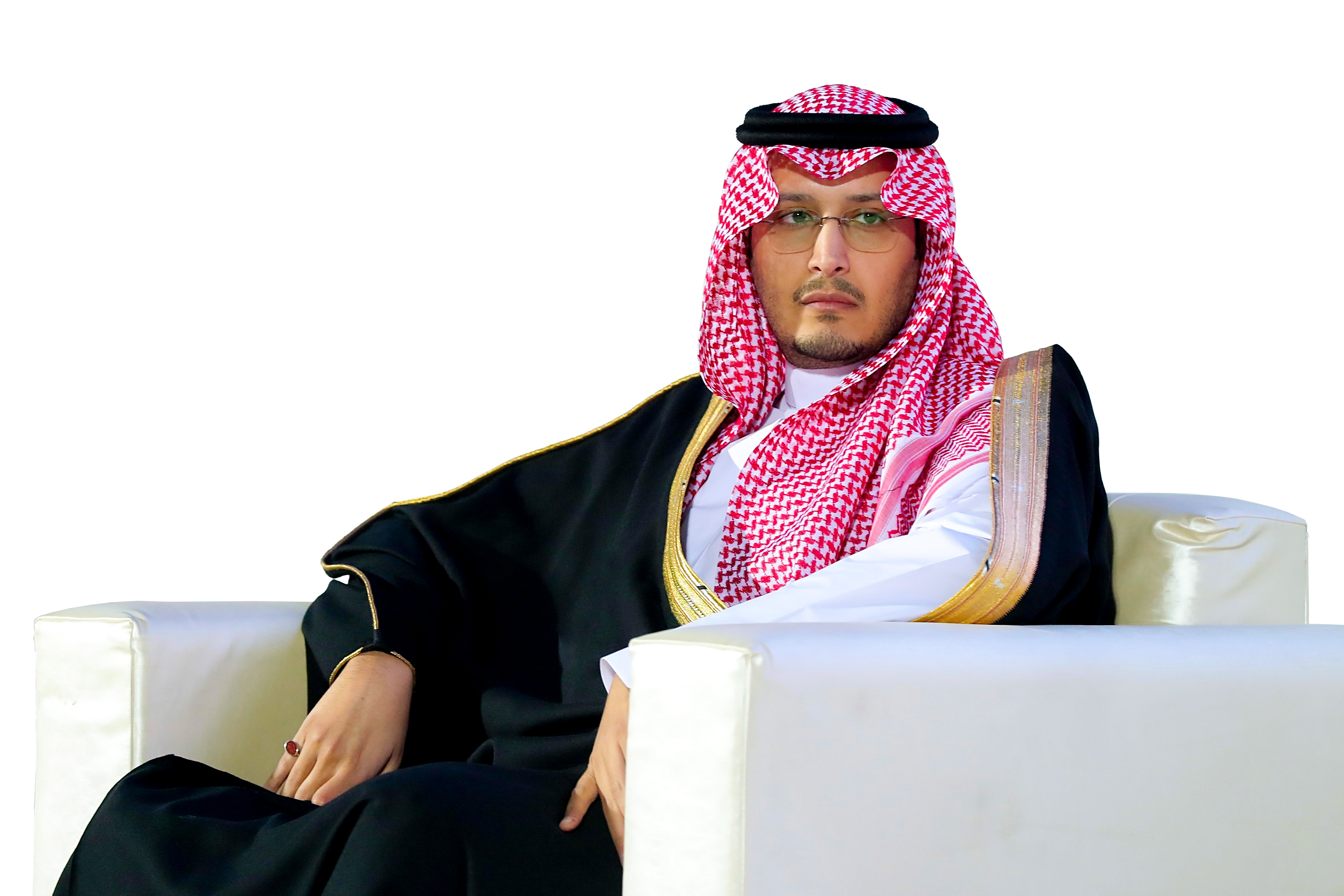

Deputy Governor of the Eastern Province
- In office: April 2017– 12 December 2023
- Successor: Saud bin Bandar Al Saud
- Monarch: King Salman
- Born: 9 September 1986 (age 40); Riyadh, Saudi Arabia
- Spouse: Salma bint Badr bin Abdul Mohsen Al Saud (m. 2014)
- Issue: 1
Names
- Ahmed bin Fahd bin Salman bin Abdulaziz bin Abdul Rahman bin Faisal Al Saud
- House: Al Saud
- Father: Fahd bin Salman Al Saud
- Mother: Nouf bint Khaled bin Abdullah bin Abdul Rahman Al Saud
- Education: King Saud University

Styles of Prince Ahmed
- Reference style: His Royal Highness
- Spoken style: Your Royal Highness

Ahmed bin Fahd Al Saud (Arabic: أحمد بن فهد بن سلمان بن عبد العزيز آل سعود; born 9 September 1986) is a member of Saudi royal family. He was the deputy governor of Eastern province of Saudi Arabia between 2017 and 2023.

== Early life and education ==
Prince Ahmed was born on 9 September 1986. His father is late Fahd bin Salman bin Abdulaziz Al Saud; the eldest son of King Salman. His mother is Nouf bint Khalid ibn Abdullah who died on 20 July 2021. Ahmed bin Fahd has one brother, Sultan, and two sisters, Sara and Reema.

His mother's family controls Mawarid Holding, which owns OSN, one of the largest satellite television providers in the Middle East, and American Express Middle East.

Ahmed bin Fahd received his primary education at the Dhahran schools in the Eastern provinces. He attended Najd schools in Al Riyadh and then, Al Riyadh schools in 2003. He earned a bachelor's degree in law from the King Saud University in 2007. Also, he also undertook specialized courses in the fields of research, assets administration, brokerage and investment banking from the Jadwa Investment Corporation.

== Career ==
In 2014 Ahmed in Fahd worked at the department of political affairs in the Saudi embassy in London.

In April 2017, Prince Ahmed was appointed deputy governor of the Eastern Province, home to the world's largest onshore oil field. Abqaiq, the world's largest oil processing plant, the Ghawar oilfield, and the kingdom's Shiite minority are all located in the Eastern Province. His tenure as deputy governor of the Eastern province ended on 12 December 2023 when Prince Saud bin Bandar Al Saud was appointed to the post.

== Personal life ==
Ahmed bin Fahd is married to Salma bint Badr bin Abdul Mohsen Al Saud. They married on 9 December 2014 and have a daughter, Nouf (born July 2019).

Ahmed bin Fahd has many charitable concerns and humanitarian contributions. He is a member of many charitable associations and organizations, including:

- Honorary member of the disabled kids association in Riyadh.
- A member in the development committee of the charitable organization for orphans care (Insan).
- He joined the board of directors of the charitable organization for orphans care (Insan) on (13 April 2013).
