= Sultana bint Turki Al Sudairi =

Saudi royal, first wife of King Salman (1940–2011)

- Born: c. 1940
- Died: 30 July 2011 (aged 71); Riyadh, Saudi Arabia
- Burial: 2 August 2011; Al Oud cemetery, Riyadh
- Spouse: Salman bin Abdulaziz Al Saud (m. 1954)
- Issue: List: Prince Fahd; Prince Sultan; Prince Ahmed; Prince Abdulaziz; Prince Faisal; Princess Hessa
Names
- Sultana bint Turki bin Ahmed bin Muhammad Al Ahmad Al Sudairi
- House: Al Saud (by marriage)
- Father: Turki bin Ahmed Al Sudairi

Sultana bint Turki Al Sudairi (Arabic: سلطانة بنت تركي السديري; c. 1940 – 30 July 2011) was a Saudi royal. She was the cousin and first wife of Prince Salman bin Abdulaziz. Three years after her death, Sultana's husband became king of Saudi Arabia.

== Biography ==
Sultana was the daughter of Turki Al Sudairi, who served as the governor of Asir Province from the early days of the Kingdom to 8 June 1969 before becoming governor of Jizan Province. He was King Salman's maternal uncle.

Sultana married Salman bin Abdulaziz in 1954 at the age of 14 years old. They had six children: Prince Fahd, Prince Sultan, Prince Ahmed, Prince Abdulaziz, Prince Faisal and Princess Hessa. The family lived in a palace near the royal court.

She was involved in philanthropic activities through the Prince Fahd bin Salman Charitable Society for the Care of Kidney Patients and other charitable organizations in Saudi Arabia and Pakistan. She founded Princess Sultana Foundation in May 1990. Its educational institution was established in 2000, and Princess Sultana University College for Women was established in 2001 which is a higher education institution for women in Islamabad, Pakistan.

Sultana bint Turki had a kidney ailment since early 1980s and frequently went abroad for treatment. She spent long periods of vacation at the Casa Riad palace, located on the Golden Mile in Marbella next to the palace of King Fahd's family. During her vacation in Marbella in 2011, she was treated at a private hospital there, but she was transferred in mid-July from Malaga airport to Riyadh with an air ambulance plane when her condition became much worse. She died at age 71 in Riyadh on 30 July 2011. Funeral prayers for her were performed at Imam Turki bin Abdullah Mosque in Riyadh on 2 August.
