= Ahmed bin Salman Al Saud =

Saudi royal and businessman (1958–2002)

- Born: 17 November 1958; Riyadh, Saudi Arabia
- Died: 22 July 2002 (aged 43); Riyadh, Saudi Arabia
- Burial: 23 July 2002; Al Oud cemetery, Riyadh
- Spouse: Lamia bint Mishaal Al Saud
- Issue: 5
Names
- Ahmed bin Salman bin Abdulaziz Al Saud
- Dynasty: House of Saud
- Father: Salman bin Abdulaziz Al Saud
- Mother: Sultana bint Turki Al Sudairi

Ahmed bin Salman Al Saud (Arabic: أحمد بن سلمان بن عبد العزيز آل سعود; 17 November 1958 – 22 July 2002) was a Saudi royal and media executive who was also a major figure in international thoroughbred horse racing. He was the third son of Salman bin Abdulaziz Al Saud, who later became governor of Riyadh and is the current king of Saudi Arabia. He was one of the grandsons of Saudi's founder King Abdulaziz.

== Early life ==
Prince Ahmed was born in Riyadh on 17 November 1958. He was the third son of Salman bin Abdulaziz and Sultana bint Turki Al Sudairi. Ahmed bin Salman was the full brother of Prince Fahd, Prince Sultan, Prince Abdulaziz, Prince Faisal and Princess Hassa.

== Education ==
Prince Ahmed first studied at Colorado School of Mines. He then graduated from Wentworth Military Academy in Lexington, Missouri.

Later, Ahmed bin Salman attended the University of California, Irvine, studying comparative culture, and graduated from the university in the early 1980s.

== Career ==
Ahmed bin Salman joined the Saudi armed forces before dealing in business. After leaving the Saudi armed forces in 1985, he established ASAS, a company which specialized in maintenance and contracting. He became chairman of the Saudi Research and Marketing Group (SRMG) in 1989, a media company with offices in Riyadh and Jeddah as well as in London and Washington D.C. Prince Ahmed also bought 80 percent of the daily Asharq Al Awsat, which is a publication of the SRMG.

The SRMG was reported to be the largest media company in the Arab world. The business was worth $90 million when Prince Ahmed took over the company and its assets had grown to nearly $533 million at the point he died. After his death, his full brother Prince Faisal became the chairman of SRMG.

== Involvement in horse racing ==
Ahmed bin Salman began horseracing activity with his college friend Richard Mulhall as his horse trainer and eventually his manager of racing operations. First he bought a gray stallion named Jumping Hill. Then, Prince Ahmed began racing under the name Universal Stable until 1994. Later, he created the Thoroughbred Corporation and became the principal partner of this company. In 1999, Ahmed bin Salman won The Derby with Oath. He also won the Preakness and Belmont Stakes with the 2001 horse of the year, Point Given. He also achieved another dream by winning the Kentucky Derby with War Emblem in May 2002, making him the first Arab horse owner to win this race. War Emblem was sold to Prince Ahmed just three weeks before the race after the horse won the Illinois Derby. The price of the horse was $900,000. Prince Faisal, his brother, succeeded him as the head of the Thoroughbred Corporation after his death in 2002.

Ahmed bin Salman also owned Spain, horse racing's all-time female money-winner. He is one of only four men to have raced both a Kentucky Derby winner and an Epsom Derby winner. The others are John W. Galbreath, Michael Tabor, and Paul Mellon.

=== War Emblem's win in the Preakness ===
With his college friend Richard Mulhall as trainer, he got into the racing business initially as Universal Stable. In 1994, the operation resurfaced as The Thoroughbred Corporation, with Mulhall retiring as a trainer and taking on the job of racing manager. Mulhall is the president of the operation. The pair would go on to racing greatness, both with sales purchases and homebreds. The Thoroughbred Corp.'s roster reads like a who's who of racing in the past decade, with such greats as Sharp Cat, Lear Fan, Jewel Princess, Windsharp, Military, Royal Anthem, Anees, Officer, Habibti, Spain, 2001 Horse of the Year Point Given, and this year's dual classic winner War Emblem. Thoroughbred Corp. has approximately 60 horses in training, mostly stabled with Bob Baffert, D. Wayne Lukas, and John Shireffs, along with 45 broodmares, mostly at Mill Ridge Farm in Lexington. His name will always be associated with War Emblem, his one Kentucky Derby winner, which he quipped was "one of the best investments I ever made in my life, besides buying oil in Saudi Arabia," after he won the Preakness. He bought a 90% share in the colt just three weeks before the Derby, and with the win, became the first Arab owner to capture the Roses.

== Other positions ==
Ahmed bin Salman was appointed secretary-general of the Prince Fahd bin Salman Charitable Association for Kidney Patients, and was a member of the charity's board of directors following the death of his elder brother Fahd bin Salman in 2001.

== Personal life ==
Prince Ahmed was survived by his wife, Lamia bint Mishaal, daughter of Mishaal bin Saud Al Saud. They married in 1986 and had four daughters and a son. His family owns three percent of Saudi Research and Marketing Group.

== Death and double funeral ==
Ahmed bin Salman died of heart failure at age 43 in Riyadh on 22 July 2002. He was buried in Al Oud cemetery on 23 July 2002 after funeral prayers at the Imam Turki bin Abdullah mosque in Riyadh. His cousin, Sultan bin Faisal bin Turki bin Abdullah, brother of Abdullah bin Faisal, was coming to Riyadh to participate in the funeral prayers for Prince Ahmed when he was killed in a car crash. The cousins were buried together.

== Legacy ==
Faisal bin Salman announced in 2004 that Prince Ahmad bin Salman Institute for Applied Media Training would be established to train journalists.

== Alleged Knowledge of 9/11 attacks in question ==
In Why America Slept (2003), Gerald Posner claimed Ahmed bin Salman, along with Sultan bin Faisal bin Turki bin Abdullah, and Prince Fahd bin Turki bin Saud al-Kabir, all had ties to al-Qaeda, and had advance knowledge of the September 11, 2001 attacks. All three died within days of each other, soon after the CIA inquired about their possible connection to the attacks. The story was strongly denied by his family, who claimed he admired the United States, spent a great deal of time at his home there in Bradbury, California, and had invested heavily in the American horse racing industry. His friends in American horse racing stated their knowledge of him and his attitudes made it impossible to believe the allegations.

== Ancestry ==
Ancestors of Ahmed bin Salman Al Saud

16. Faisal bin Turki bin Abdullah Al Saud
8. Abdul Rahman bin Faisal
17. Sarah bint Mishari bin Abdulrahman bin Hassan Al Saud
4. King Abdulaziz
18. Ahmed Al Kabir bin Mohammed bin Turki Al Sudairi
9. Sara bint Ahmed Al Sudairi
2. Salman bin Abdulaziz Al Saud
20. Mohammed bin Ahmed Al Kabir Al Sudairi (= 24)
10. Ahmed bin Mohammed Al Sudairi (= 12)
5. Hassa bint Ahmed Al Sudairi
22. Ali bin Mohammed Al Suwaidi (= 26)
11. Sharifa bint Ali bin Mohammed Al Suwaidi (= 13)
1. Ahmed Al Saud
24. Mohammed bin Ahmed Al Kabir Al Sudairi (= 20)
12. Ahmed bin Mohammed Al Sudairi (= 10)
6. Turki bin Ahmed Al Sudairi
26. Ali bin Mohammed Al Suwaidi (= 22)
13. Sharifa bint Ali bin Mohammed Al Suwaidi (= 11)
3. Sultana bint Turki Al Sudairi

== Other sources ==
- Gerald Posner. (2003).Why America Slept. Random House. ISBN 978-0-375-50879-0
- Craig Unger. (2004). House of Bush, House of Saud. Scribner ISBN 978-0-7432-5337-6
