= Fahd bin Salman Al Saud =

Saudi royal, businessman, and horse racer (1955–2001)

- Born: 1955; Riyadh, Saudi Arabia
- Died: 25 July 2001 (aged 45–46); Riyadh, Saudi Arabia
- Burial: 25 July 2001; Al Oud cemetery, Riyadh
- Spouse: Nouf bint Khalid bin Abdullah Al Saud
- Issue: 4, including Prince Ahmed
Names
- Fahd bin Salman bin Abdulaziz bin Abdul Rahman bin Faisal Al Saud
- House: Al Saud
- Father: Salman bin Abdulaziz
- Mother: Sultana bint Turki Al Sudairi

Fahd bin Salman Al Saud (Arabic: فهد بن سلمان آل سعود, romanized: Fahd bin Salman Āl Su‘ūd; 1955 – 25 July 2001) was a Saudi royal, businessman, and thoroughbred racer. He was a son of King Salman and one of the grandsons of Saudi's founder King Abdulaziz.

== Early life and education ==
Prince Fahd was born in Riyadh in 1955. He was the eldest son of Prince Salman bin Abdulaziz (later king of Saudi Arabia). His mother was Sultana bint Turki Al Sudairi, who died in July 2011. She was the daughter of Prince Salman's uncle, Turki bin Ahmed Al Sudairi, who was formerly the governor of Asir Province. Fahd bin Salman was a full brother of Prince Ahmed, Prince Sultan, Prince Abdulaziz, Prince Faisal, and Princess Hassa.

Fahd bin Salman received a bachelor's degree from King Saud University in Riyadh, followed by a second bachelor of arts degree in political science from the University of California, Berkeley.

== Career ==
On his return to Saudi Arabia, Fahd bin Salman joined the ministry of interior as an advisor. Later he served as deputy governor of the Eastern province from February 1986 to February 1993. He claimed that he spent about $4 million from his own pocket, on feasts and largesse for commoners in the Muslim holy month of Ramadan during his deputy governorship.

From 1991 to his death in 2001, Fahd bin Salman was involved in private business ventures. One of his companies was the Eirad Company, a space technology firm based in Riyadh.

== Horse racing and breeding ==
Fahd bin Salman was introduced to horse racing in the early 1980s by his father-in-law, Khalid bin Abdullah, and he bought the famous Whatcombe stable near Lambourn in 1984. He later acquired a stable of Thoroughbred racehorses and established Newgate Stud in Dorset and in Lexington.

His greatest success came with the colt Generous whose victories included the 1991 Epsom Derby, King George VI and Queen Elizabeth Stakes, and the Irish Derby. He won the Irish Oaks twice, in 1990 and 1999, with Knight's Baroness and Ramruma, respectively. Prince Fahd also won the Irish St Leger (1990), Derby Italiano (1994) and the French Derby (Prix du Jockey Club).

His other horses included Ibn Bey, Broken Hearted, Zoman, Insan, Bint Pasha, Magic Ring and Dilum. In his later years, he began to devote himself to breeding horses rather than to racing.

== Other activities ==
The Prince Fahd bin Salman Charity Organization for Renal Failure Patient Care is a charitable organization founded by Prince Fahd, who was its first secretary-general. The association was formerly known as the Wafa Kidney Center in Namas and was renamed after the death of Fahd bin Salman. His father, Salman bin Abdulaziz, serves as its chairman, and as of 2012, his brother, Abdulaziz bin Salman, was the secretary general.

== Personal life ==
Prince Fahd married his cousin Nouf bint Khalid Al Saud (1962–2021), the daughter of his paternal aunt Al Jawhara bint Abdulaziz and Prince Khalid bin Abdullah. In 2017, Nouf was involved in a London court hearing about her property deals in the United Kingdom. She died on 20 July 2021.

Fahd bin Salman's children are Sultan, Sara, Ahmed and Reema. One of his daughters, Princess Sara, married Talal bin Abdulaziz, a grandson of Bandar bin Abdulaziz on 26 May 2011.

== Death ==
It was announced that Fahd bin Salman died due to heart failure in Riyadh on 25 July 2001. He had booked an appointment with a dentist at the King Faisal Specialist Hospital and Research Centre for a toothache. Funeral prayers were held at the Turki bin Abdullah Mosque in Riyadh following regular afternoon prayer on 25 July 2001. He was buried in Al Oud cemetery in Riyadh.

== Ancestry ==
Ancestors of Fahd bin Salman Al Saud

16. Faisal bin Turki bin Abdullah Al Saud
8. Abdul Rahman bin Faisal
17. Sara bint Mishari bin Abdulrahman bin Hassan Al Saud
4. King Abdulaziz
18. Ahmed Al Kabir bin Mohammed bin Turki Al Sudairi
9. Sara bint Ahmed Al Sudairi
2. Salman bin Abdulaziz Al Saud
20. Mohammed bin Ahmed Al Kabir Al Sudairi (= 24)
10. Ahmed bin Mohammed Al Sudairi (= 12)
5. Hassa bint Ahmed Al Sudairi
22. Ali bin Mohammed Al Suwaidi (= 26)
11. Sharifa bint Ali bin Mohammed Al Suwaidi (= 13)
1. Fahd Al Saud
24. Mohammed bin Ahmed Al Kabir Al Sudairi (= 20)
12. Ahmed bin Mohammed Al Sudairi (= 10)
6. Turki bin Ahmed Al Sudairi
26. Ali bin Mohammed Al Suwaidi (= 22)
13. Sharifa bint Ali bin Mohammed Al Suwaidi (= 11)
3. Sultana bint Turki Al Sudairi
