= Sultan bin Salman Al Saud =

Saudi Arabian royal, astronaut, and government official (born 1956)

His Royal Highness Prince Sultan bin Salman Al Saud
- سلطان بن سلمان آل سعود
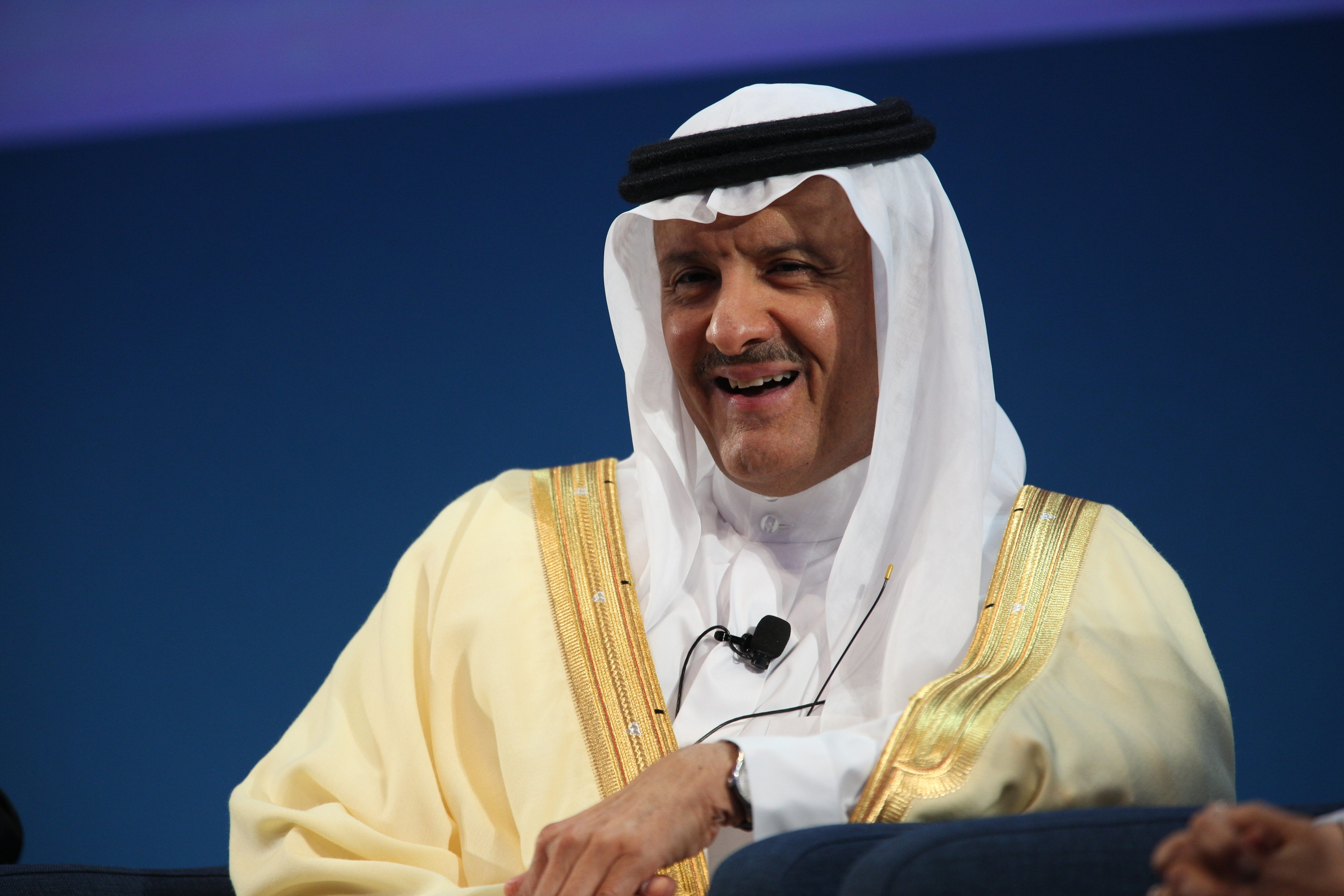
- Sultan in 2016
- Born: 27 June 1956 (age 70); Riyadh, Saudi Arabia
- Education: University of Denver; Syracuse University
- Occupation: Chairman of the Board of Directors of the Saudi Space Commission
- House: Al Saud
- Parents: Salman bin Abdulaziz Al-Saud (father); Sultana bint Turki Al Sudairi (mother)
- Occupation: Fighter pilot
- Space career

Payload Specialist
- Rank: Colonel, Royal Saudi Air Force
- Time in space: 7d 01h 38m
- Missions: STS-51-G

Prince Sultan bin Salman Al Saud (Arabic: سلطان بن سلمان آل سعود; Sulṭān bin Salmān Āl Suʿūd; born 27 June 1956) is a Saudi prince and former Royal Saudi Air Force pilot who flew aboard the American STS-51-G Space Shuttle mission as a payload specialist. He is the first member of a royal family to fly in space, the first Arab and the first Muslim to fly in space, as well as (at 28 years old) the youngest person ever to fly on a space shuttle. On 27 December 2018, he was appointed as chairman of the Board of Directors of the Saudi Space Commission with the rank of minister. He is the eldest surviving son of King Salman and one of the grandsons of Saudi's founder King Abdulaziz.

== Early life and education ==
Sultan was born in Riyadh on 27 June 1956, as the second son of Prince Salman, then governor of Riyadh province and now King of Saudi Arabia. His mother was Sultana bint Turki Al Sudairi. She was a daughter of King Salman's uncle, Turki bin Ahmed Al Sudairi, who was one of the former governors of al-Jouf, Jizan and Asir Province and was a participant in the unification campaign under his cousin, the founder of the Kingdom Abdulaziz ibn Saud. Prince Sultan is a full brother of Fahd, Ahmed, Abdulaziz, Faisal and Hassa.

Sultan completed his elementary and secondary education in Riyadh, He received a bachelor's degree in mass communications from the University of Denver and a master's degree in social and political science with distinction from Syracuse University's Maxwell School of Citizenship and Public Affairs in 1999.

== Early experience ==
Sultan bin Salman started his career in 1982 as a researcher in the department of international communications at the Ministry of Information in Saudi Arabia. His tenure lasted until 1984. He served as deputy director of the Saudi media committee for the Saudi athletes participating in the 1984 Summer Olympics in Los Angeles. Later that year, the department of TV advertising was created at the Ministry of Information, and he was appointed its acting director.

From 17 June through 24 June 1985, he flew as a payload specialist on STS-51-G Discovery. As one of a seven-member international crew, which also included American and French astronauts, he represented the Arab Satellite Communications Organization (ARABSAT) in deploying its satellite, ARABSAT-1B. He also had a conversation after landing with Abdulaziz ibn Abdullah Al Baz, Saudi Islam scholar and later Grand Mufti, telling him that he had observed the rotation of the Earth. Ibn Baz had previous held to a pre-Copernican view that "the Earth is fixed and stable," but he trusted Sultan as a Muslim witness.

Later, he assisted in establishing the Association of Space Explorers, an international organization comprising all astronauts and cosmonauts who have been in space. Currently, Sultan is a member of ASE's International Executive Committee.

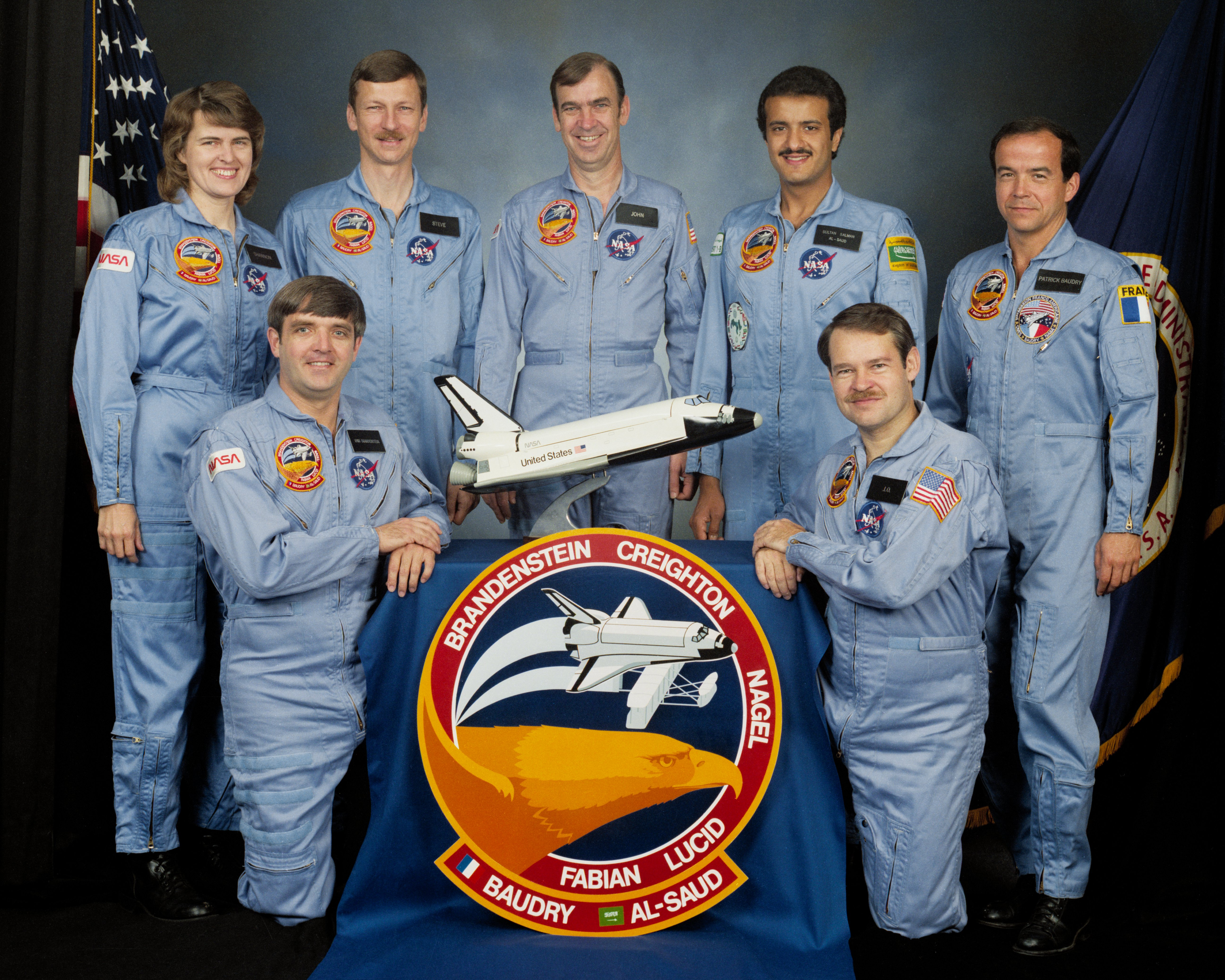
Portrait of STS 51-G crew

In 1985, Sultan recorded a commercial message that was broadcast on MTV during the Live Aid concert event. His message mentioned his recent trip on the Space Shuttle and was one of 33 such by notable individuals. Sultan bin Salman served in the Royal Saudi Air Force beginning in 1985 and held the rank of lieutenant colonel. He retired from the air force in 1996 with the rank of colonel.

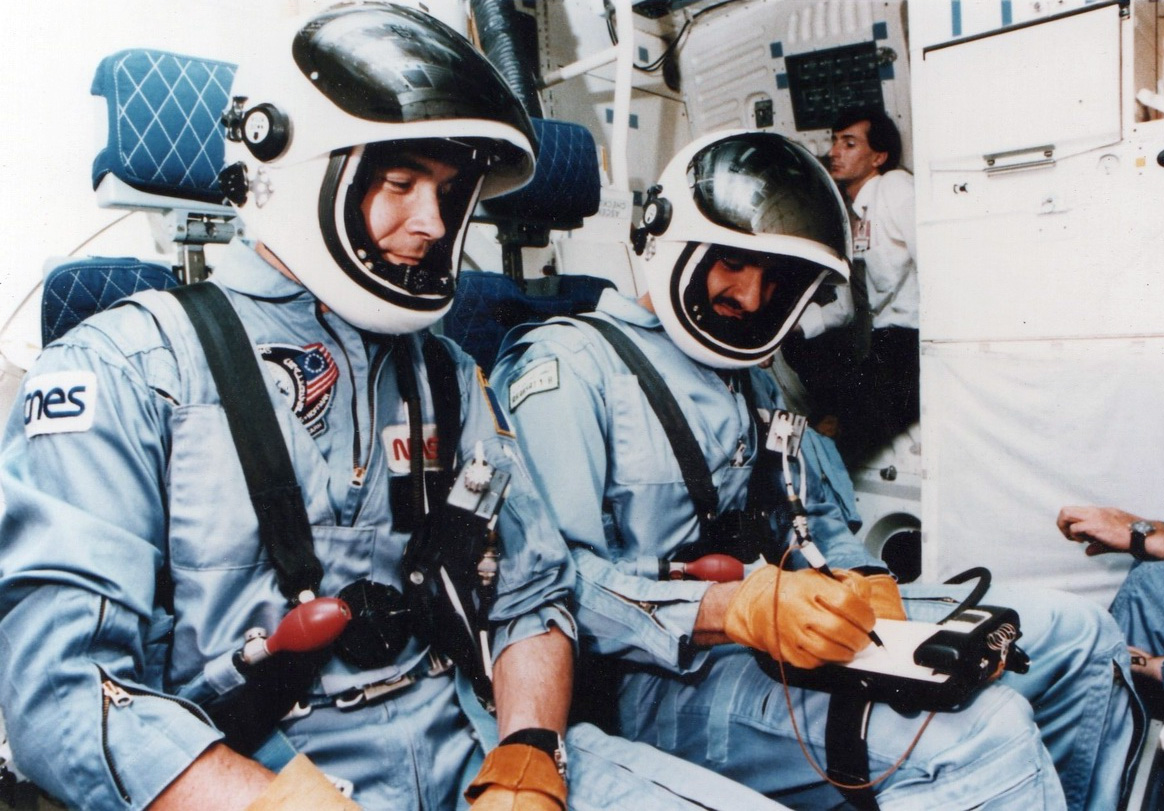
Patrick Baudry and Prince Sultan in 1985

At the time of his space flight, Sultan had over 1,000 cumulative hours of flight time; as of February 2020, he has over 8,000 flight hours as a military and civilian pilot.

== Positions ==
In December 2018, he was the chairman of the board of the Saudi Space Commission. From 2009 until joining the space commission, Sultan bin Salman served as the president and chairman of the Saudi Commission for Tourism and National Heritage (SCTH). He served as the commission's secretary general since its inception in 2000. As secretary-general, he contributed significantly to the improvement of Saudi Arabia's tourism and national heritage strategy, and organizational building and innovation in the Saudi government.

On 3 May 2021, Sultan bin Salman was appointed as special advisor to the King with a rank of minister, and chairman of the board of trustees of King Salman Foundation, a newly established non-profit organization.

== Books ==
Sultan bin Salman Al Saud has written several books:

- Early Documents in (Saudi) Architectural Legacy (وثائق مبكرة في مسيرة التراث العمراني) (2010)
- The Architectural Heritage (سيرة في التراث العمراني) (2010)
- One planet, the story of the first Arab mission to space (2011), together with Ahmed Nabil Abo Khatwa and Tarek Ali Fadaak
- The Possible Imagination (الخيال الممكن)

He also edited the book by Facey, William, Back to Earth: Adobe Building in Saudi Arabia, Riyadh: Al Turath Foundation (2015).

== Personal life ==
Sultan bin Salman is married to Princess Haifa, daughter of Prince Saud bin Faisal, the former minister of foreign affairs of Saudi Arabia and the son of King Faisal. They have three children. His son, Salman (born 1990), attended St. Andrew's University in Scotland and Oxford University and married a daughter of Prince Khalid bin Saud Aql Saud, a great-grandson of Mohammed bin Abdul Rahman, the brother of King Abdulaziz, in Riyadh on 5 December 2012. His daughter (born 1994) also attended St. Andrews University.

Sultan enjoys flying, gliding, skiing, and exploring nature in his spare time. He owns a farm in Diriyah which is a model of modern facilities in a historical setting. His farm reflects his attempt to retrace the origins of the Al Saud family, and to document the Al Saud's claims over the Najd.

== Ancestry ==
Ancestors of Sultan bin Salman Al Saud

8. Abdul Rahman bin Faisal
4. Abdulaziz Ibn Saud
9. Sara bint Ahmed Al Sudairi
2. Salman bin Abdulaziz Al Saud
10. Ahmed bin Mohammed Al Sudairi (= 12)
5. Hussa bint Ahmed Al Sudairi
11. Sharifa bint Ali bin Mohammed Al Suwaidi (= 13)
1. Sultan Al Saud
12. Ahmed bin Mohammed Al Sudairi (= 10)
6. Turki bin Ahmed Al Sudairi
13. Sharifa bint Ali bin Mohammed Al Suwaidi (= 11)
3. Sultana bint Turki Al Sudairi
