= Faisal bin Salman Al Saud =

Saudi royal, businessman and governor (born 1970)

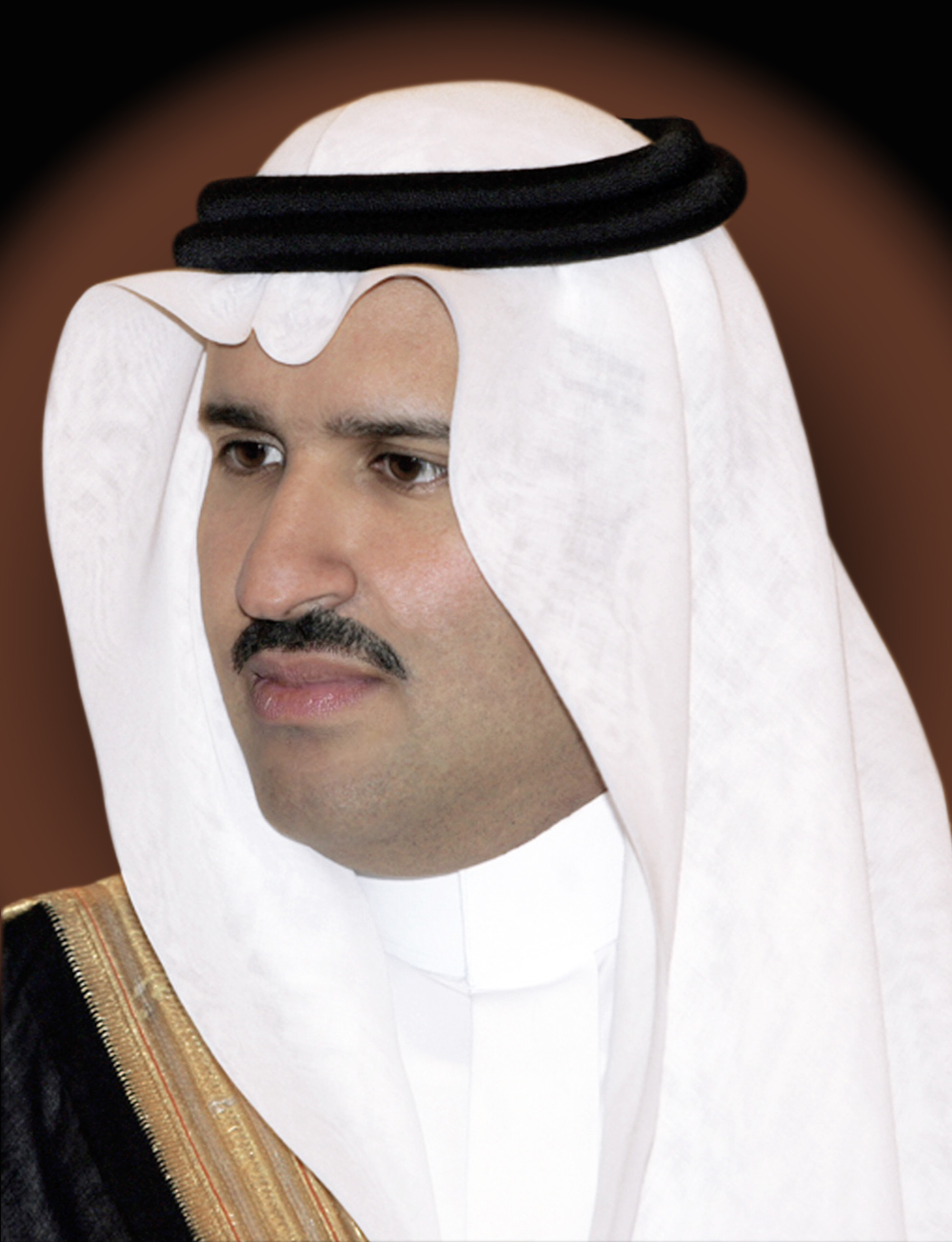
- Faisal in 2007

Governor of Madinah Province
- Reign: 14 January 2013 – 12 December 2023
- Predecessor: Abdulaziz bin Majid
- Successor: Salman bin Sultan Al Saud
- Appointed by: King Abdullah
- Born: 25 December 1970 (age 55); Riyadh, Saudi Arabia
Names
- Faisal bin Salman bin Abdulaziz bin Abdul Rahman Al Saud
- House: Al Saud
- Father: King Salman
- Mother: Sultana bint Turki Al Sudairi
- Education: King Saud University; Oxford University

Faisal bin Salman Al Saud (Arabic: فيصل بن سلمان آل سعود Fayṣal bin Salmān Āl Suʿūd; born 25 December 1970) is a member of the House of Saud, a grandson of King Abdulaziz and son of King Salman, and was governor of Madinah province in Saudi Arabia from 14 January 2013 to 12 December 2023. Following his tenure as governor, he was appointed as a special advisor to the Custodian of the Two Holy Mosques, King Salman, holding ministerial rank. He was also appointed chairman of the Board of Directors of the King Abdulaziz Foundation for Research and Archives (KAFRA), based on a recommendation by Crown Prince and Prime Minister Mohammed bin Salman, who is his younger half-brother. Additionally, Prince Faisal has been appointed as chairman of the Board of Trustees of the King Fahad National Library by the Crown Prince.

== Early life and education ==
Prince Faisal was born in Riyadh on 25 December 1970. He is the fifth son of Salman bin Abdulaziz, the King of Saudi Arabia. His mother is Sultana bint Turki Al Sudairi, who died in July 2011. She was a daughter of King Salman's uncle, Turki bin Ahmed Al Sudairi, who was formerly the governor of Asir Province. Faisal is a full brother of Prince Fahd, Prince Ahmed, Prince Sultan, Prince Abdulaziz and Princess Hassa.

His wife is Lulwa bint Ahmad bin Musaed bin Ahmad Al Sudairi (m. 2004), and he has three sons: Fahd, Ahmad, and Salman.

Faisal bin Salman holds a bachelor's degree in political science from King Saud University. He received a PhD from Oxford University in 1999. His PhD thesis was titled "Iran, Saudi Arabia and the Gulf: Power Politics in Transition 1968-1971", and was published by I.B.Tauris in 2003.

== Career ==
Prince Faisal was a professor of political science at King Saud University. He studied especially political relations in the Persian Gulf region among the others during his academic career. During this period he was a research fellow at Georgetown University.

After the death of his brother Prince Ahmed in 2002, Prince Faisal took over as chairman of the Saudi Research and Marketing Group (SRMG), reportedly the largest media company in the Middle East, North and Central Africa. He was reported to own around seven percent of the company, while the family of his late brother Ahmed owns three percent. It is reported that the newspapers owned by the SRMG, including Arab News, Asharq Al-Awsat and Al Eqtisadiah take a pro-government position and supported King Abdullah's cautious reforms. Faisal bin Salman began to publish a new magazine through the SRMG that is an Arabic translation of the magazine Robb Report. He also established a school for training journalists and other media people. He has been the chairman of Jadwa Investment, a Riyadh-based leading Saudi investment bank, since 2006.

On 14 January 2013, Faisal bin Salman was appointed governor of Madinah province at the rank of minister, replacing Abdulaziz bin Majid in the post. After his appointment as governor, Faisal bin Salman was succeeded by his half-brother, Turki bin Salman, as chairman of the SRMG. Prince Faisal's tenure as governor of Madinah province ended on 12 December 2023 when Salman bin Sultan Al Saud was named as the new governor with the rank of minister. Prince Faisal became an advisor to the king on the same date.

== Other positions ==
Prince Faisal joined the council of the International Institute for Strategic Studies (IISS) in 2009. He is also chairman of the board of social responsibility in Riyadh. In addition, he chairs the executive committee of “Ensan Society” that deals with various support programs for orphans.

Prince Faisal has been the chairman of King Abdulaziz Foundation for Research and Archives and the chairman of the board of trustees of the King Fahad National Library since 12 December 2023.

=== Views ===
Faisal bin Salman stated in 2007 that social change in Saudi Arabia had to be slow.

=== Awards ===
Faisal bin Salman was named "The Man of the Year 2004 in business" by Arabian Business in 2004. He was also named the Media Personality of the Year by the Arab Media Forum in 2009. He was awarded Hilal-e-Pakistan on 12 December 2023.

=== Horse racing ===
His brothers Prince Fahd and Prince Ahmed, both deceased, were involved in thoroughbred horse racing. After the death of Prince Ahmed in 2002, Prince Faisal succeeded him as the head of The Thoroughbred Corporation. In addition, he owns Belgrave Bloodstock in England.

In 2002, Faisal bin Salman had 12 horses in training, with Paul Cole, Sir Mark Prescott and John Gosden in England; Aidan O'Brien in Ireland; Jean-Claude Rouget in France; and Julio Canini and Graham Motion in the United States. It is reported that his best horse is Last Second, dam of Aussie Rules. She won both the Sun Chariot Stakes and Nassau Stakes in 1996. Prince Faisal also won the 1995 Cherry Hinton Stakes with another horse, Applaud. Last Second later became his most successful broodmare. He has his own stud, Denford Stud near Hungerford, Berkshire. His racing manager is James Wigan. In 2011, Central Park was Faisal's best juvenile.

Prince Faisal bred Aussie Rules in Kentucky and is racing him in cooperation with Susan Magnier and Michael Tabor. He had four mares boarded at Indian Creek Farm near Paris (Kentucky). The dam of Aussie Rules, Last Second, has had only one foal sell at public auction, Bold Glance, who went for $2,202,250 in October 2005. Belgrave also has kept several fillies out of Last Second, including stakes winner Approach. Other mares are kept at Chris Budgett's Kirtlington Stud in the United Kingdom.

== Works ==
- Iran, Saudi Arabia and the Gulf: Power Politics in Transition, 2003.

== Ancestry ==
Ancestors of Faisal bin Salman Al Saud

8. Abdul Rahman bin Faisal
4. Ibn Saud
9. Sara bint Ahmed Al Sudairi
2. Salman Al Saud
10. Ahmed bin Mohammed Al Sudairi (= 12)
5. Hassa bint Ahmed Al Sudairi
11. Sharifa bint Ali bin Mohammed Al Suwaidi (= 13)
1. Faisal Al Saud
12. Ahmed bin Mohammed Al Sudairi (= 10)
6. Turki bin Ahmed Al Sudairi
13. Sharifa bint Ali bin Mohammed Al Suwaidi (= 11)
3. Sultana bint Turki Al Sudairi

Political offices
Preceded by Abdulaziz bin Majid Al Saud	Governor of Madinah Province; 2013–2023	Succeeded by Salman bin Sultan Al Saud
