= Al Oud cemetery =

Public cemetery in Riyadh, Saudi Arabia

Al Oud Cemetery
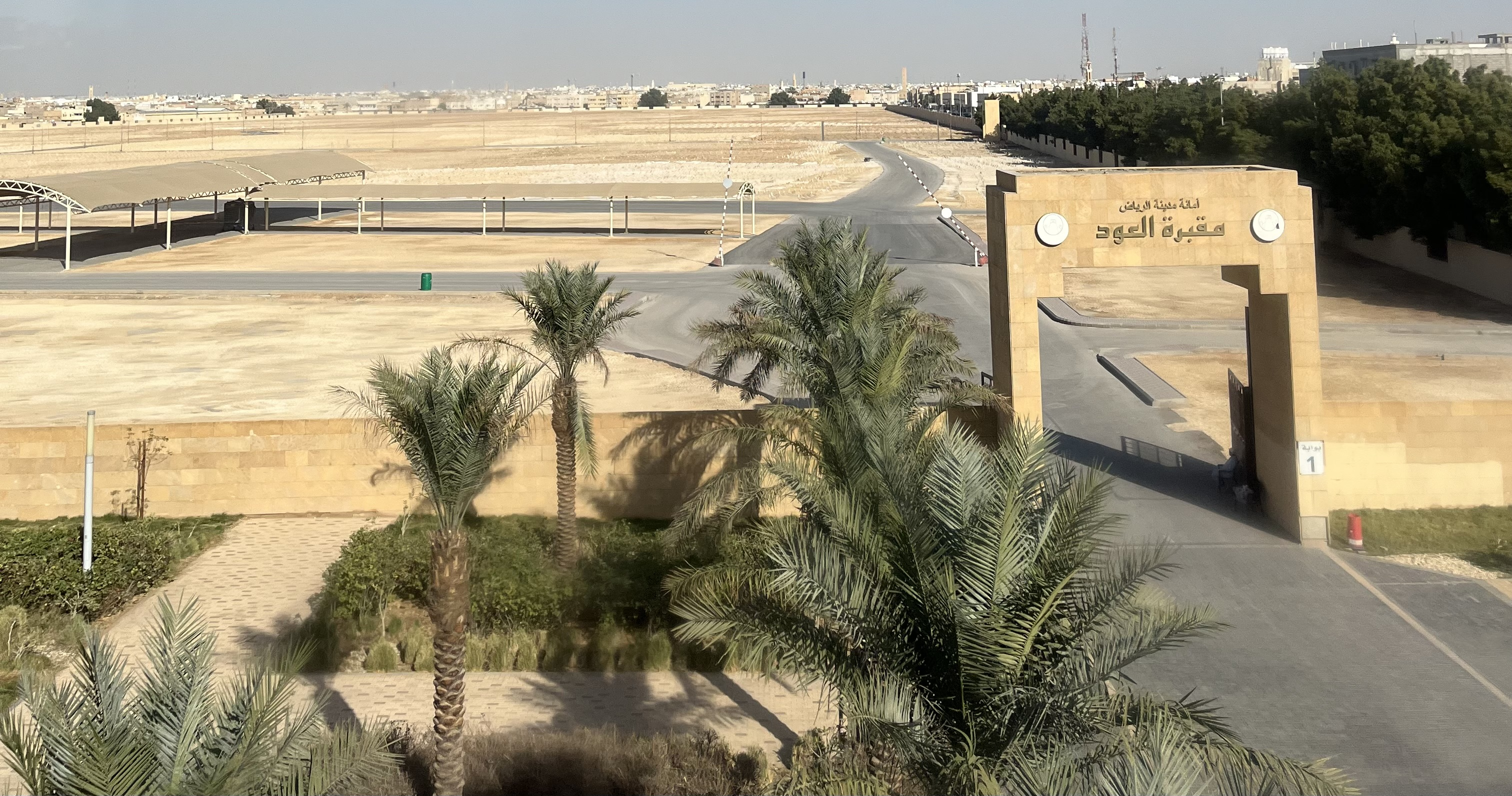
- Al Oud cemetery, 2026
- Interactive map of Al Oud Cemetery

Details
- Location: Al Oud, Riyadh
- Country: Saudi Arabia
- Coordinates: 24°37′23″N 46°43′40″E
- Type: Muslim
- Owned by: Kingdom of Saudi Arabia

Al Oud Cemetery (Arabic: مقبرة العود) is a public cemetery in the al-Owd neighbourhood of Riyadh, Saudi Arabia, known for being the resting place of several members of the Saudi royal family. The word "al-ʿŪud", in Peninsular Arabic means "elder (older person)", likely referring to King Abdulaziz, who was buried in the cemetery.

== Location ==
Al Oud graveyard is situated at Al Ghafran district and around 1 km away from Bat'ha street, the center of Riyadh. More specifically, the cemetery is on the right hand side of Batha'a street going south, between Al Diriyah and Manhub. It is some 2 1/2 km from the Imam Turki bin Abdullah mosque. In March 2012, the environmental health directorate of the Riyadh municipality started a project to mark each grave electronically. People usually go there to pay respects to the dead.

== Burials ==
The cemetery is well-known, since it is the resting place for many members of the Saudi royal family, including King Abdulaziz, King Fahd, King Khalid, King Faisal, King Saud, and King Abdullah and many of their wives and children.

Other senior royal figures, such as Prince Sultan, Prince Fahd, Prince Ahmed, Sultana bint Turki bin Ahmad Al Sudairi, wife of King Salman, Hussa bint Turki al Awwal, and Sultan bin Faisal bin Turki bin Abdullah were also buried there. The others include Prince Nasser, Prince Faisal, Prince Abdul Majeed, Prince Talal, Prince Badr, Prince Muhammed, Prince Turki, Sultana bint Abdulaziz Al Saud, and Saud bin Abdullah Al Saud.

Well-known writer and public-figure Ghazi Abdul Rahman Al Gosaibi was buried there, too. The graveyard is being used for both commoners and royalty.
