= Hassa bint Salman Al Saud =

Saudi royal

- Born: Riyadh, Saudi Arabia
- Spouse: Mamdouh bin Abdul Rahman Al Saud (divorced); Fahd bin Saad Al Saud
- Issue: 4
Names
- Hassa bint Salman bin Abdulaziz Al Saud
- House: Al Saud
- Father: King Salman
- Mother: Sultana bint Turki Al Sudairi

Hassa bint Salman Al Saud (Arabic: حصة بنت سلمان بن عبد العزيز آل سعود; born 1974) is a Saudi royal and academic. She is the only daughter of King Salman and one of the grandchildren of Saudi Arabia's founder King Abdulaziz.

== Early life and education ==
Princess Hassa is the only daughter of King Salman. Her mother is Sultana bint Turki Al Sudairi who was King Salman's first wife and first cousin. Her full brothers are Prince Fahd, Prince Sultan, Prince Ahmed, Prince Abdulaziz and Prince Faisal. She is the half-sister of Crown Prince Mohammed bin Salman.

She was named Hassa after her paternal grandmother, Hassa bint Ahmed Al Sudairi.

Although she attended King Abdulaziz University (KAU) in Jeddah for a year during her undergraduate studies, she received her bachelor's degree in English language and literature from King Saud University in Riyadh.

CBS reported that as of 2019, she was believed to be in her 40s.

== Activities ==
Hassa bint Salman works as a lecturer in the faculty of law and political studies at King Saud University. She has been publicly supportive of her father since he came to the throne in 2015. In 2016, the Princess delivered a keynote address at Al Yamamah University lauding the achievements of Saudi women. She participated in the activities of the Saudi human rights commission. In June 2020, Hassa bint Salman was made the honorary chair of the Saudi Social Responsibility Association.

=== French court case ===
In 2016 the magazine Le Point reported that Hassa bint Salman ordered her bodyguard Rani Saïdi to beat a plumber for taking a picture of her. The plumber was called to her apartment in Paris because of a broken bathroom fixture. In the course of taking photographs of the scene he accidentally took a picture in which the Princess could be seen reflected in a mirror. The Princess took offense to this and ordered her bodyguard to beat the man and then forced him at gunpoint to apologize and kiss her feet. He had formerly worked on a bathroom in an apartment on Avenue Foch owned by King Salman. The plumber testified that the Princess said "Kill him, the dog, he doesn’t deserve to live.” In 2018 a French judge ordered the arrest of the Princess.

In September 2019 she was convicted in absentia of armed violence for the incident. She received a 10-month suspended prison sentence and a fine of 10,000 euros. Saïdi was convicted of violence, sequestration, and theft.

== Personal life ==
She was previously married to Mamdouh bin Abdul Rahman Al Saud, which ended in divorce. On 28 May 2021, she married Fahd bin Saad Al Saud at the Royal Sea Palace in Jeddah.

== Ancestry ==
Ancestors of Hassa bint Salman Al Saud

16. Faisal bin Turki bin Abdullah Al Saud
8. Abdul Rahman bin Faisal
17. Sarah bint Mishari bin Abdulrahman bin Hassan Al Saud
4. King Abdulaziz
18. Ahmed Al Kabir bin Mohammed bin Turki Al Sudairi
9. Sara bint Ahmed Al Kabir bin Mohammed Al Sudairi
2. Salman Al Saud
20. Mohammed bin Ahmed Al Kabir Al Sudairi (= 24)
10. Ahmed bin Mohammed Al Sudairi (= 12)
5. Hassa bint Ahmed Al Sudairi
22. Ali bin Mohammed Al Suwaidi (= 26)
11. Sharifa bint Ali bin Mohammed Al Suwaidi (= 13)
1. Hassa Al Saud
24. Mohammed bin Ahmed Al Kabir Al Sudairi (= 20)
12. Ahmed bin Mohammed Al Sudairi (= 10)
6. Turki bin Ahmed Al Sudairi
26. Ali bin Mohammed Al Suwaidi (= 22)
13. Sharifa bint Ali bin Mohammed Al Suwaidi (= 11)
3. Sultana bint Turki Al Sudairi
