= Saud bin Salman Al Saud =

Saudi prince and entrepreneur (born 1986)

- Born: Saud bin Salman Al Saud; 21 December 1986 (age 39); Paris, France
- Spouse: Chorouk bint Mohammad Almejfel
- Issue: 3
- House: Al Saud
- Father: King Salman
- Mother: Sarah bint Faisal Al Subai'ai
- Occupation: Businessman

Saud bin Salman Al Saud (Arabic: سعود بن سلمان بن عبد العزيز آل سعود; born 28 December 1986) is a Saudi prince, entrepreneur and business magnate. He was the chairman and chief executive officer (CEO) of Enicayle and a president of Société civile 72 avenue Foch who is widely recognized as a pioneer of the phone wholesale and microcomputer industry in Africa after the real estate became his main activity with EL Bouqdaoui Yacine, a French entrepreneur. He is the son of King Salman bin Abdulaziz Al Saud and one of the grandsons of Saudi Arabia's founder King Abdulaziz.

== Personal life and career ==
Saud bin Salman was born on 21 December 1986, and graduated from King Saud University majoring in political science. His mother (second wife of King Salman, currently divorced) is Sarah bint Faisal Al Subai'ai, and his wife is Chorouk bint Mohammad Al Mejfel. Saud does not have any full siblings. His half-siblings include Crown Prince and Prime Minister Mohammed, Defense Minister Khalid, and Energy Minister Abdulaziz.

He is involved in charitable activities and serves as the honorary president of both “Saudi Management Association” and “Cooperative Societies Council”.

== Horse Racing ==
Prince Saud bin Salman takes part in horse racing in Saudi and has previously won the Saudi Cup. He owns many horses including Emblem Road (Saudi CuMaking Miracles. The Saudi government is hoping to bring equestrian sports closer to all segments of society by organising events and attracting international names.

Najjam and Making Miracles, both owned by Prince Saud bin Salman, won the Saudi Crown Prince’s Cup over two races, bringing in overall prize money of SR2 million ($533,000).

== Ancestry ==
Ancestors of Saud bin Salman Al Saud

16. Faisal bin Turki bin Abdullah Al Saud
8. Abdul Rahman bin Faisal
17. Sarah bint Mishari bin Abdulrahman bin Hassan Al Saud
4. King Abdulaziz
18. Ahmed Al Kabir bin Mohammed bin Turki Al Sudairi
9. Sara bint Ahmed Al Kabir bin Mohammed Al Sudairi
2. Salman Al Saud
20. Mohammed bin Ahmed Al Kabir Al Sudairi
10. Ahmed bin Mohammed Al Sudairi
5. Hassa bint Ahmed Al Sudairi
22. Ali bin Mohammed Al Suwaidi
11. Sharifa bint Ali bin Mohammed Al Suwaidi
1. Saud Al Saud
12. Daidan Al Subai'ai
6. Faisal bin Daidan Al Subai'ai
3. Sarah bint Faisal Al Subai'ai
