= Cooperative Societies Council =

Saudi Arabian governmant organization

- مجلس الجمعيات التعاونية

Agency overview
- Formed: March 17, 2008; 18 years ago
- Jurisdiction: Government of Saudi Arabia
- Headquarters: Riyadh, Saudi Arabia
- Agency executive: Prince Saud bin Salman bin Abdulaziz al Saud, Honorary President

The Cooperative Societies Council, or, also known as the Saudi Cooperative Societies Council, is a government organization in Saudi Arabia which aims at support of cooperative societies in the Kingdom through activating the role of the Board of Cooperative Societies, the deployment of collaborative work culture, building human, financial and technical capabilities, and establish effective partnerships to establish collaborative work culture for the benefit of the community and the Saudi economy. The organization is largely influenced by Prince Saud Bin Salman bin Abdulaziz al Saud
