= Jadwa Investment =

Private equity firm in Saudi Arabia

- Native name: جدوى للاستثمار
- Type: Closed joint stock company
- Industry: Sharia Compliant Investment Bank
- Founded: 2006; 20 years ago
- Headquarters: Riyadh
- Key people: Faisal bin Salman (Former chair); Ahmed bin Aqeel Al Khateeb (Former CEO); Tariq Al Sudairy(MD & CEO)
- Services: Asset Management; Real Estate Funds; Discretionary Portfolio Management; Private Equity; Investment Banking; Research; Brokerage; Online Trading
- Website: www.jadwa.com

Jadwa Investment is the premier investment management and advisory firm in Saudi Arabia and the wider region. Headquartered in Riyadh with three regional offices, the firm has over SAR 70 billion in client assets under management and advisement. Its clients include government entities, local and international institutional investors, leading family offices, and high net-worth individuals.

As of 2025, Jadwa Investment is among the largest private equity investors in Saudi Arabia and a significant manager of listed real estate investment trusts (REITs). The firm has been ranked by several financial publications as a leading public equity manager in the region based on assets under management (AUM).

Under the CMA decision published on 21 August 2006, Jadwa was awarded a license to offer all types of investment services including: dealing, managing, custody, arranging and advising.

All investment services offered by Jadwa Investment are supervised by a Shariah Supervisory Board and are fully Shariah-compliant. Operating divisions include Asset Management, Investment Banking, Research, Proprietary Investments and Equity Brokerage.

Its full investment banking operations began in March 2007 with a paid-up capital of 500 million Saudi riyals by a group of prominent businessmen in the Kingdom who helped lay a solid foundation for the company's long-term growth. The first fiscal year was completed on December 31 2007.

In April 2014, the Board of the Saudi Capital Market Authority approved an increase in the capital of Jadwa Investment Company to 852,735 million Saudi riyals.

In December 2023, it was announced that Jadwa Investment had acquired Dubai-based food and beverage operator Black Spoon Group, which is the parent company of restaurant Allo Beirut.

== Ownership ==
The founding partners include Faisal bin Salman, chairman of the board, Mohammed and Abdullah Ibrahim Al Subeaei Company, the Al Zamil Group, Abdulrahman Saleh Al Rajhi, Mohammed Ibrahim Al Issa, Abdulrahman Al Ruwaita, and Abdullatif Kanoo. Tariq Al Sudairy is the CEO of the company.
