= Abdulaziz bin Salman Al Saud =

Saudi royal and politician (born 1960)

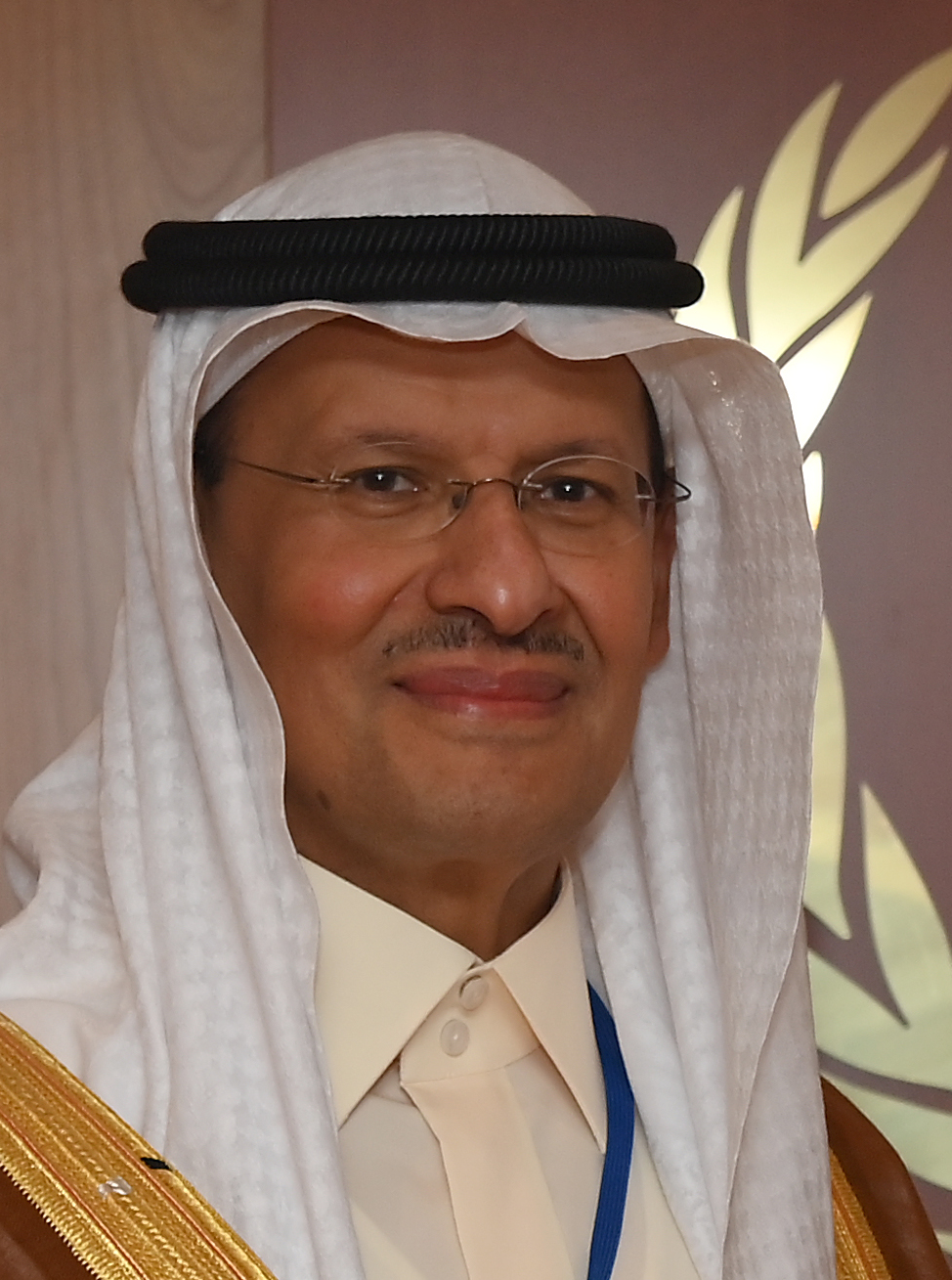
- Abdulaziz in 2021

Minister of Energy
- In office: 8 September 2019 – present
- Predecessor: Khalid al-Falih
- Monarch: Salman

State Minister for Energy Affairs
- In office: 22 April 2017 – 8 September 2019
- Monarch: King Salman

Assistant Minister of Petroleum and Mineral Resources
- In office: 2005 – 22 April 2017
- Monarch: Abdullah; Salman

Deputy Minister of Petroleum and Mineral Resources
- In office: July 1995 – 2005
- Monarch: King Fahd; King Abdullah
- Born: 1960 (age 65–66)
- Spouse: Sara bint Khalid bin Musaid bin Abdulaziz Al Saud
- Issue: 3
Names
- Abdulaziz bin Salman bin Abdulaziz bin Abdul Rahman Al Saud
- House: Al Saud
- Father: Salman bin Abdulaziz
- Mother: Sultana bint Turki Al Sudairi
- Education: King Fahd University of Petroleum and Minerals

Abdulaziz bin Salman Al Saud (Arabic: عبد العزيز بن سلمان آل سعود ʿAbd al ʿAzīz bin Salman Al Suʿūd; born 1960) is a Saudi royal, one of the sons of King Salman and one of the grandsons of Saudi's founder King Abdulaziz, and a politician who has served as the Saudi Arabian minister of energy since September 2019. Since July 2026 he is also Minister of Industry and Mineral Resources in addition to that. He is the first royal to serve as energy minister. He was the assistant oil minister of Saudi Arabia between 2005 and 2017. In 2017, he was made state minister for energy affairs.

== Early life and education ==
Prince Abdulaziz was born in 1960 as the fourth son of King Salman bin Abdulaziz. His mother is Sultana bint Turki Al Sudairi, who died at age 71 in July 2011. She was the daughter of Salman's uncle, Turki bin Ahmed Al Sudairi, who was formerly the governor of Asir Province. Abdulaziz bin Salman is the full brother of Fahd bin Salman, Ahmed bin Salman, Sultan bin Salman, Faisal bin Salman and Hassa bint Salman.

Abdulaziz bin Salman received a science degree in industrial administration from King Fahd University of Petroleum and Minerals. He also holds an MBA in industrial administration from the same university in 1985.

== Career ==
Abdulaziz bin Salman began his career as a lecturer at King Fahd University of Petroleum and Minerals, followed by a period as an acting director of the research institute there, dealing with energy studies. Later, he served as the manager of the economic and industrial research division at the same institute.

In 1987, he became an advisor at the oil ministry. During his tenure, he is said to have had tense relations with the oil minister, Hisham Nazer. Prince Abdulaziz was promoted to deputy oil minister in June 1995. He was also appointed undersecretary for petroleum affairs, a body founded in June 1996. In addition, he was the head of the energy rationalization committee.

His term as deputy oil minister lasted until 2005 when he was appointed assistant oil minister. His term as assistant oil minister ended on 22 April 2017 when he was made state minister for energy affairs. During this role, he achieved a major breakthrough in talks with OPEC member Kuwait to resume production in the neutral zone between the two countries, after a four-year halt.

On 8 September 2019, he was named as the Minister of Energy.

He signed the 2026 nuclear cooperation agreement and bilateral safeguards deal with the United States.

== Influence ==
As assistant oil minister, Prince Abdulaziz was regarded as a significant figure in Saudi politics since he dealt directly with the Kingdom's major source of income, petroleum. He is said to be popular and has supporters who have benefited from their support of him and his father, King Salman. Prince Abdulaziz was considered to be one of the future key players in Saudi Arabia when the grandsons of King Abdulaziz begin to rule the country. He was also considered to be a potential successor to the former oil minister, Ali Naimi.

== Other roles ==
Prince Abdulaziz is a member of the board of governors of the following organizations: Oxford Institute for Energy Studies, Oxford Energy Policy Club and the Institute of Petroleum. He is honorary president of the Saudi Economic Association. He is also the supervisor-general of the Prince Fahd bin Salman Charity Association for Renal Failure Patients Care.

== Personal life ==
Abdulaziz bin Salman is married to Sara bint Khalid bin Musaid bin Abdulaziz (born 1966). They have three children: Prince Salman, Prince Khalid and Princess Sultana.

== Ancestry ==
Ancestors of Abdulaziz bin Salman Al Saud

16. Faisal bin Turki bin Abdullah Al Saud
8. Abdul Rahman bin Faisal
17. Sara bint Mishari bin Abdulrahman bin Hassan Al Saud
4. King Abdulaziz
18. Ahmed Al Kabir bin Mohammed bin Turki Al Sudairi
9. Sara bint Ahmed Al Sudairi
2. Salman Al Saud
20. Mohammed bin Ahmed Al Kabir Al Sudairi (= 24)
10. Ahmed bin Mohammed Al Sudairi (= 12)
5. Hussa bint Ahmed Al Sudairi
22. Ali bin Mohammed Al Suwaidi (= 26)
11. Sharifa bint Ali bin Mohammed Al Suwaidi (= 13)
1. Abdulaziz Al Saud
24. Mohammed bin Ahmed Al Kabir Al Sudairi (= 20)
12. Ahmed bin Mohammed Al Sudairi (= 10)
6. Turki bin Ahmed Al Sudairi
26. Ali bin Mohammed Al Suwaidi (= 22)
13. Sharifa bint Ali bin Mohammed Al Suwaidi (= 11)
3. Sultana bint Turki Al Sudairi
