= King Fahad National Library =

National library in Riyadh, Saudi Arabia

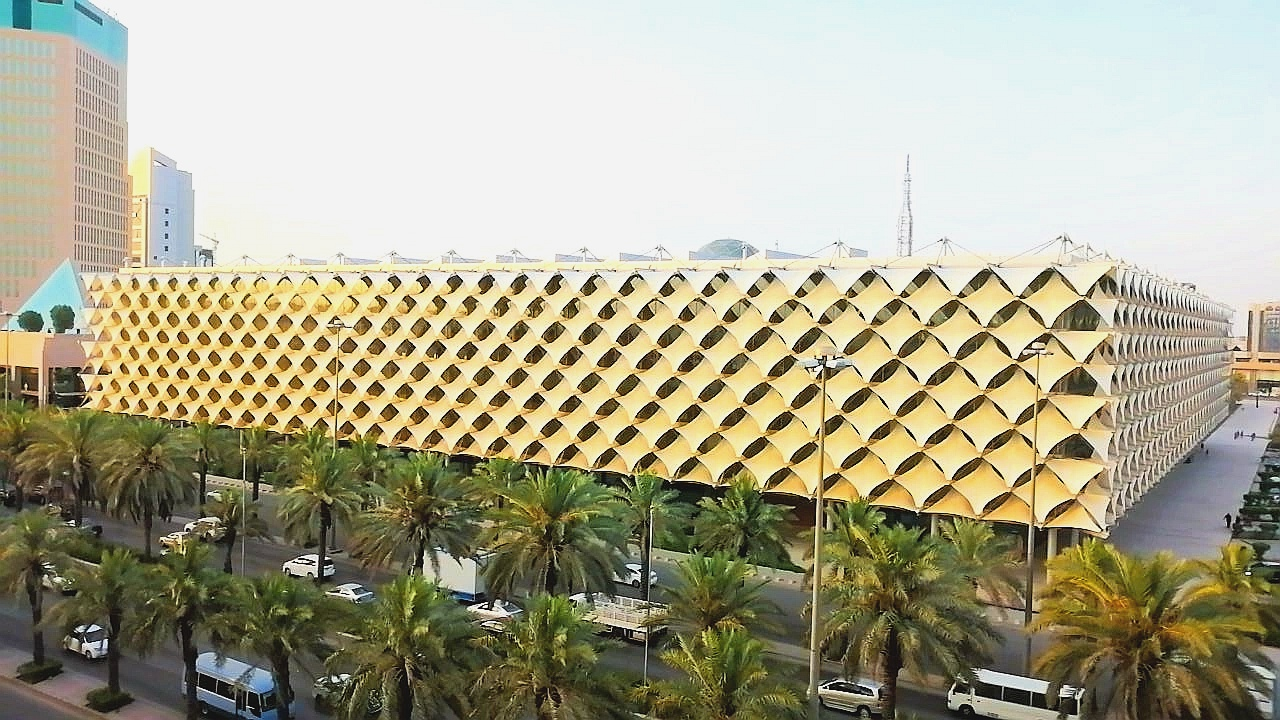
- King Fahad Library in 2022
- 24°41′9″N 46°41′13″E
- Location: Olaya, Riyadh, Saudi Arabia
- Type: National library
- Established: 1990; 36 years ago

Collection
- Size: Around 2,400,000 items

Other information
- Director: Faisal bin Salman Al Saud
- Website: kfnl.gov.sa

The King Fahad National Library (KFNL, Arabic: مكتبة الملك فهد الوطنية) is the legal deposit and copyright library for Saudi Arabia. The project was announced in 1983 in response to an initiative made by the people of Riyadh when King Fahd ascended the throne, and the implementation started in 1986. The library opened in Riyadh in 1990. and is based in Riyadh.

Among KFNL's special collections are the libraries of Ihsan Abbas, Sheikh Muhammad Ibn Abd al Aziz al Mani, Sheikh Abd Allah Ibn Muhammad Ibn Khamis, Sheikh Uthman Ibn Hamad al Haqil, Sheikh Muhammad Husayn Zaydan, Fawzan Ibn Abd al Aziz al Fawzan, Yusuf Ibrahim al Sallum, Muhammad Musa al Salim, Sheikh Muhammad Mansur al Shaqha, Sheikh Abd Allah Abd al Aziz al Anqari, Sheikh Abd Allah Ibn Umar al Sheikh, Sheikh Abd Allah Ibn Muhammad al Nasban, and Sheikh Husayn Ibn Abd Allah al Jarisi.
