= Salman of Saudi Arabia =

King of Saudi Arabia since 2015

Salman
- Custodian of the Two Holy Mosques
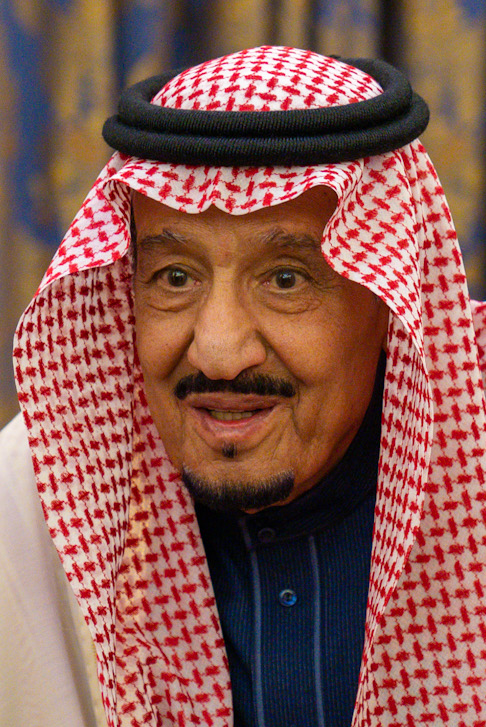
- Salman in 2020

King of Saudi Arabia
- Reign: 23 January 2015 – present
- Bay'ah: 23 January 2015
- Predecessor: Abdullah
- Crown Princes: See list: Muqrin bin Abdulaziz; Muhammad bin Nayef; Mohammed bin Salman

Prime Minister of Saudi Arabia
- In office 23 January 2015 – 27 September 2022
- Preceded by: King Abdullah
- Succeeded by: Mohammed bin Salman

Crown Prince of Saudi Arabia Deputy Prime Minister
- In office 18 June 2012 – 23 January 2015
- Monarch: Abdullah
- Preceded by: Nayef bin Abdulaziz
- Succeeded by: Muqrin bin Abdulaziz

Minister of Defense
- In office 5 November 2011 – 23 January 2015
- Preceded by: Sultan bin Abdulaziz
- Succeeded by: Mohammed bin Salman

Governor of Riyadh Province
- In office 5 February 1963 – 5 November 2011
- Appointed by: King Saud
- Preceded by: Badr bin Saud
- Succeeded by: Sattam bin Abdulaziz
- In office 18 April 1955 – 22 September 1960
- Appointed by: King Saud
- Preceded by: Nayef bin Abdulaziz
- Succeeded by: Fawwaz bin Abdulaziz

Deputy Governor of Riyadh Province
- In office 16 March 1954 – 18 April 1955
- Appointed by: King Saud
- Preceded by: Nayef bin Abdulaziz
- Succeeded by: Turki II bin Abdulaziz
- Born: 31 December 1935 (age 90); Riyadh, Saudi Arabia
- Spouses: Sultana bint Turki Al Sudairi (m. 1954; died 2011) Sarah bint Faisal Al Subai'ai (divorced) Fahda bint Falah Al Hithlain (m. 1984)
- Issue Detail: List: Prince Fahd; Prince Sultan; Prince Ahmed; Prince Abdulaziz; Prince Faisal; Princess Hassa; Crown Prince Mohammed; Prince Saud; Prince Turki; Prince Khalid; Prince Nayef; Prince Bandar; Prince Rakan
Names
- Salman bin Abdulaziz bin Abdul Rahman
- House: Al Saud
- Father: Abdulaziz of Saudi Arabia
- Mother: Hussa bint Ahmed Al Sudairi
- Religion: Sunni Islam

Salman bin Abdulaziz Al Saud (Arabic: سلمان بن عبد العزيز آل سعود, romanized: Salmān ibn ʻAbd al-ʻAzīz Āl Saʻūd; born 31 December 1935) is King of Saudi Arabia, having reigned since 2015. He is a son of King Abdulaziz, the founder of Saudi Arabia, and a member of the House of Saud. Salman is the third-oldest living head of state and the oldest living monarch. He is the first Saudi head of state born after the unification of Saudi Arabia.

Salman is a son of King Abdulaziz and Hassa bint Ahmed Al Sudairi, making him one of the Sudairi Seven. He was the deputy governor of Riyadh and later the governor of Riyadh for 48 years from 1963 to 2011. He was then appointed Minister of Defense and was named crown prince in 2012. Salman became king in 2015 upon the death of his half-brother, King Abdullah.

He has a reported personal wealth of at least US$18 billion, which makes him the third wealthiest royal in the world.

Salman's major initiatives as king include the Saudi intervention in the Yemeni Civil War, Saudi Vision 2030, and a 2017 decree allowing Saudi women to drive. His seventh son, Crown Prince Mohammed bin Salman, is considered the de facto ruler of Saudi Arabia due to the King's poor health and Mohammed's own political maneuvering. Mohammed replaced his father as prime minister in 2022, making Salman the first king since Saud in 1964 not to serve as head of government.

== Early life ==
Salman was born on 31 December 1935, and is reported to be the 25th son of King Abdulaziz, the first monarch and founder of Saudi Arabia. Salman and his six full brothers make up the Sudairi Seven. He was raised in the Murabba Palace.

Salman received his early education at the Princes' School in the capital city of Riyadh, a school established by King Abdulaziz specifically to provide education for his children. He studied Islam and Arabic language, focusing on sharia in the Wahhabi interpretation under the Hanbali school of jurisprudence. Salman, like many of his siblings learned the Quran by recitation and under a cleric in the Wahhabi tradition.

== Riyadh ==
Salman was appointed Deputy Governor of Riyadh Province on 17 March 1954, aged 18, and held the post until 19 April 1955. He was appointed the governor of the same province on 5 February 1963, and remained in that office until 5 November 2011, a period of almost half a century.

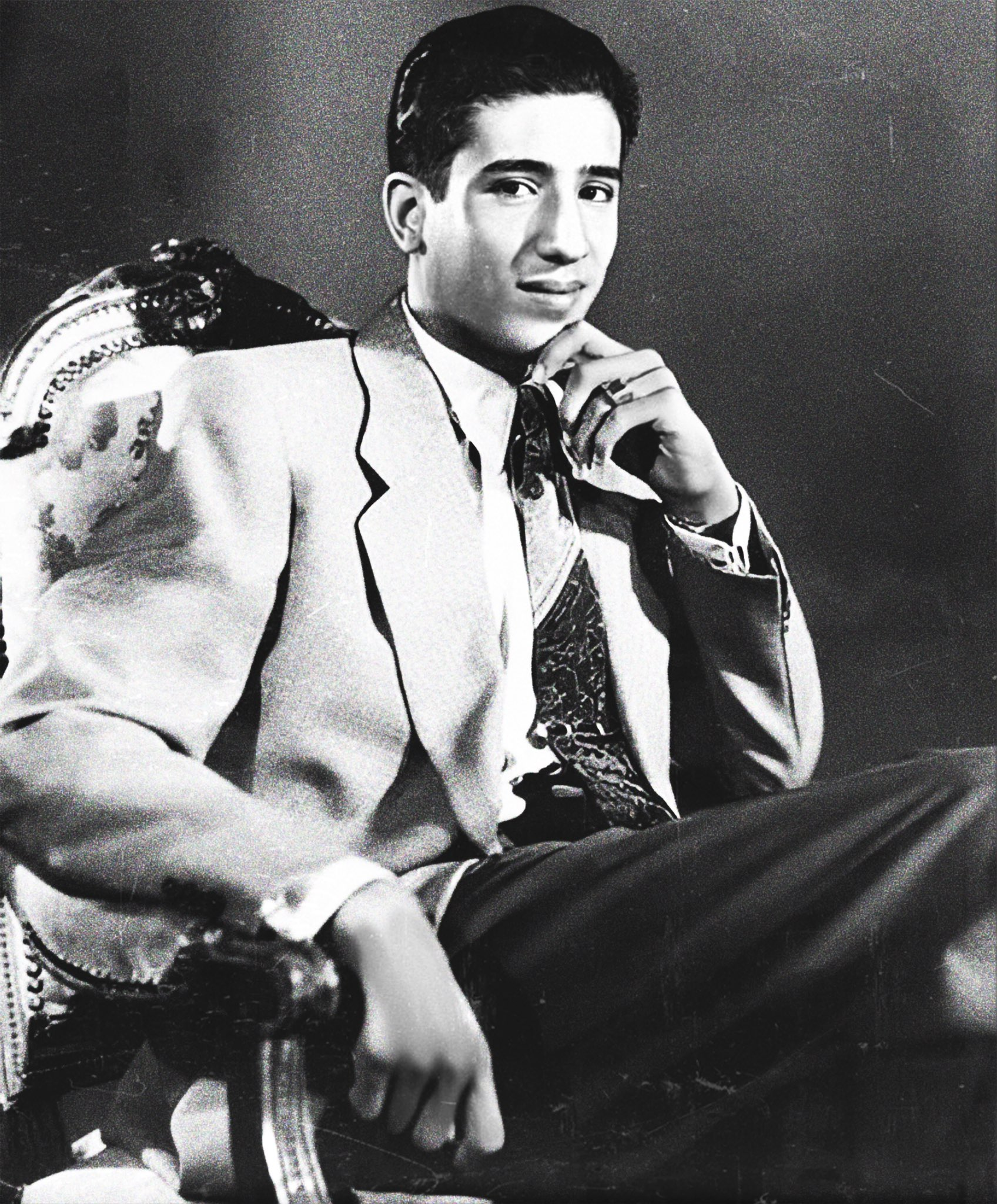
Salman in his youth

As governor, Salman contributed to the development of Riyadh from a mid-sized town into a major urban metropolis. He served as an important liaison to attract tourism, capital projects, and foreign investment to his country. He favored political and economic relationships with the West. During his governorship, Salman recruited advisors from King Saud University.

During Salman's five decades as Riyadh governor, he became adept at managing the delicate balance of clerical, tribal, and princely interests that determine Saudi policy. He was also the chairman of the King Abdulaziz Foundation for Research and Archives (KAFRA), King Abdulaziz Museum, the Prince Salman Center for Disability Research and the Prince Fahd bin Salman Charitable Society for the Care of Kidney Patients.

Salman also undertook several foreign tours while he was governor. In 1974, he visited Kuwait, Bahrain and Qatar to strengthen Saudi Arabia's relationship with those nations. During his visit to Montreal, Canada in 1991, he inaugurated a gallery. In 1996, he was received in the Élysée Palace in Paris by the then-French president Jacques Chirac. The same year he toured Bosnia and Herzegovina to give donations to the Muslim citizens of the country. Being a part of an Asian tour in 1998, Salman visited Pakistan, Japan, Brunei and China.

According to The Washington Post, the late Saudi journalist Jamal Khashoggi "criticized Prince Salman, then governor of Riyadh and head of the Saudi committee for support to the Afghan mujahideen, for unwisely funding Salafist extremist groups that were undermining the war [in Afghanistan against the Soviets]."

Under Salman, Riyadh became one of the richest cities in the Middle East and an important place for trade and commerce. There were also infrastructural advances including schools, universities, and sports stadiums. About the province, he said:

Every village or town in the Riyadh Region is dear to me, and holds a special place in my heart ... I witnessed every step taken by the city of Riyadh, and for this reason, it is difficult for me to think about being far away from Riyadh.

== Second in line ==
On 5 November 2011, Salman was appointed Minister of Defense, replacing his full brother, the Crown Prince Sultan. Sattam bin Abdulaziz was named governor of Riyadh Province. Salman was also named a member of the National Security Council (NSC) on the same day.

It is speculated that he was placed in the immediate line of succession due to his personal qualities. First, he has a conciliatory and diplomatic nature. He headed the family council, called The Descendants' Council (Majlis al Uthra in Arabic), that was established by King Fahd in 2000 to solve family matters, reach consensus and try to avoid any publicly embarrassing behaviour by some family members. Second, Salman belongs to the "middle generation" in the royal family; therefore, he could develop close ties with both generations socially and culturally. Last, due to his long-term governorship, he had developed a network of relationships within Arab and international circles.

Salman continued the policy of military intervention in Bahrain. In April 2012, Salman visited both the United States and the United Kingdom where he met with US President Barack Obama and British Prime Minister David Cameron. 2013 saw Saudi military spending climb to $67billion, overtaking that of the UK, France and Japan to place fourth globally. As defense minister, Salman was head of the military as Saudi Arabia joined the United States and other Arab countries in carrying out airstrikes against the Islamic State in Iraq and Syria in 2014.

== Crown Prince ==
On 18 June 2012, Salman was appointed as Crown Prince of Saudi Arabia shortly after the death of his brother, Crown Prince Nayef bin Abdulaziz. Prince Salman was also made First Deputy Prime minister. His nomination as crown prince and deputy prime minister was seen by some as a signal that King Abdullah's cautious reforms were likely to continue. On the other hand, Saudi reformists stated that while Prince Salman, in contrast to other Saudi royals, took a more diplomatic approach towards them, he could not be considered a political reformer. They also argued that, like King Abdullah, Salman focused mainly on economic improvement rather than political change.

On 27 August 2012, the Royal Court announced that Salman was in charge of state affairs whilst King Abdullah was out of the country. Prince Salman launched a Twitter account on 23 February 2013. In September 2012, Salman was named as the deputy chairman of the military service council. He is a strong advocate for philanthropy in poor Muslim nations such as Somalia, Sudan, and Afghanistan.

== Reign ==
On 23 January 2015, Salman, aged 79, inherited the throne after his half-brother Abdullah died of pneumonia at the age of 90. The new king issued a statement which read "His Highness Salman bin Abdulaziz Al Saud and all members of the family and the nation mourn Custodian of the Two Holy Mosques King Abdullah bin Abdulaziz, who passed away at exactly 1 am this morning." He appointed his younger half-brother, Muqrin bin Abdulaziz, as Crown Prince.

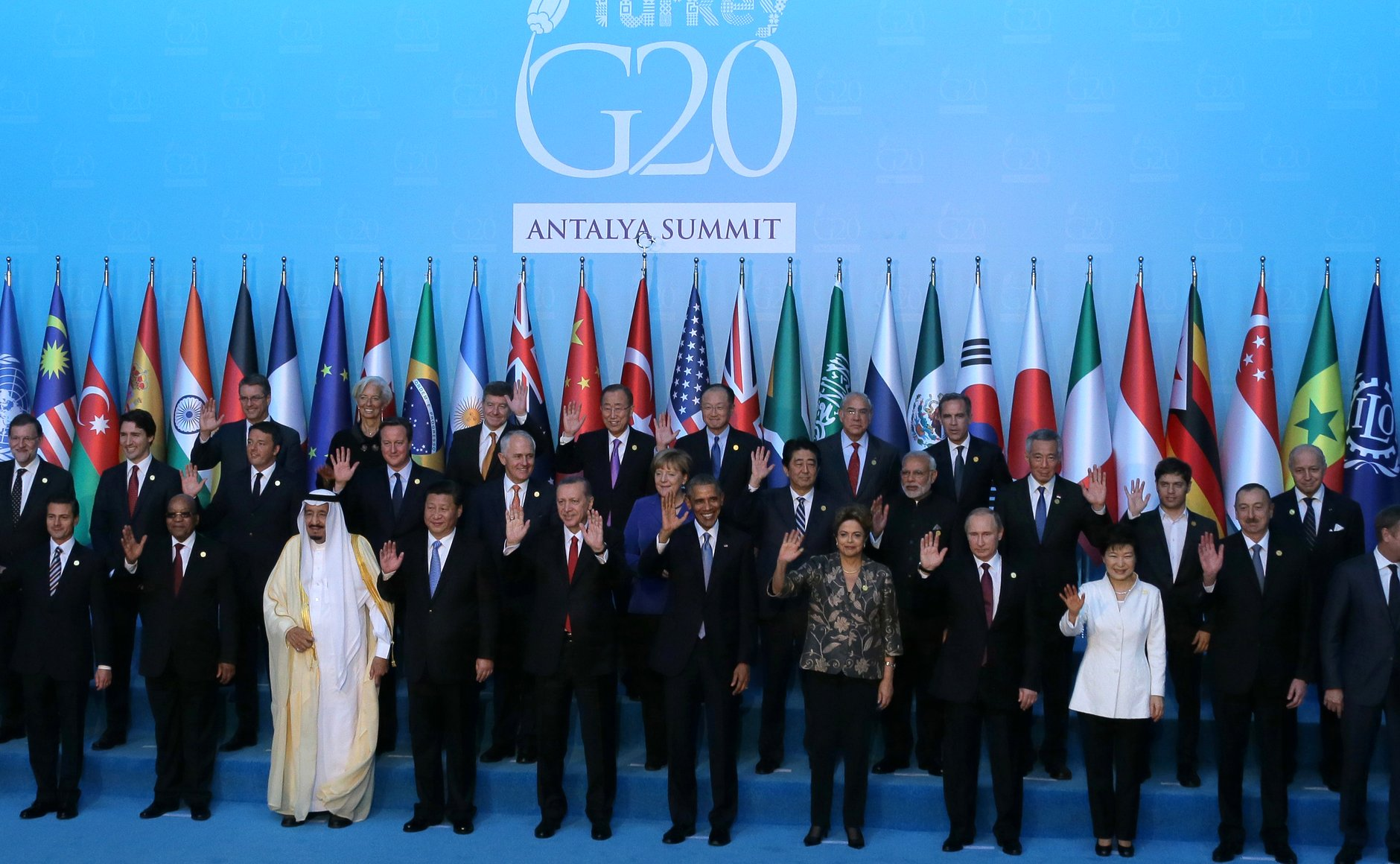
Salman at the 2015 G20 Summit in Turkey, 15 November 2015

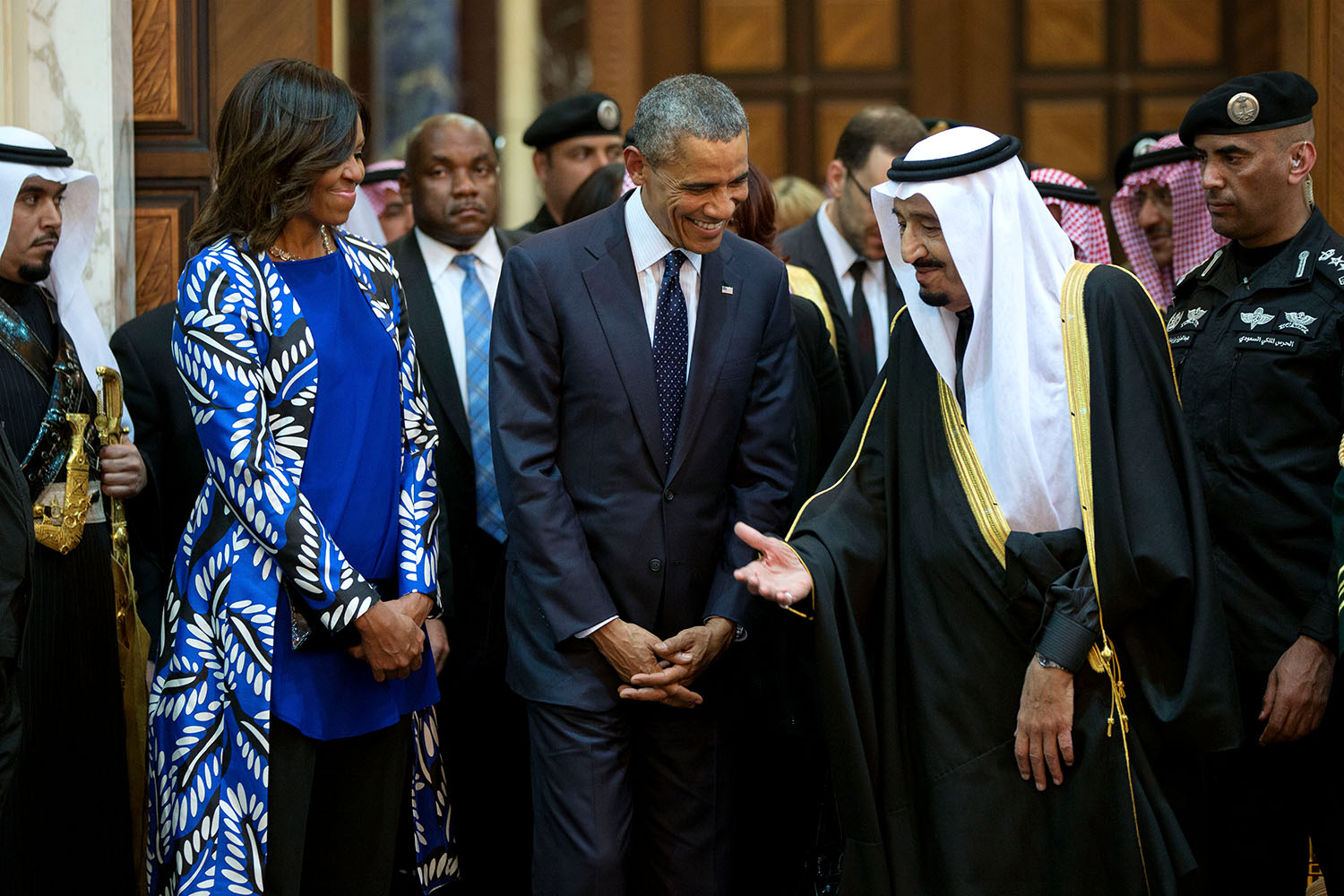
Barack Obama with King Salman in 2015

After coming to power, Salman reshuffled the cabinet on 30 January 2015. Khalid bin Ali bin Abdullah al-Humaidan was made the intelligence chief. Prince Bandar bin Sultan was removed from his post in the security council and the adviser to the monarch was also removed as were the former monarch's sons Turki as governor of Riyadh and Mishaal as governor of Mecca. Ali al-Naimi remained the minister of petroleum and mineral resources, as did Saud al-Faisal of the Ministry of Foreign Affairs and Ibrahim Al-Assaf as finance minister. Salman also "gave a bonus of two months' salary to all Saudi state employees and military personnel", including pensioners and students, while also asking citizens to "not forget me in your prayers".

In February 2015, Prince Salman received Charles, Prince of Wales, during his six-day tour in the Middle East. They "exchanged cordial talks and reviewed bilateral relations" between the countries.

In April 2021, Prince Mishaal bin Majid Al Saud, who has been the governor of Jeddah since 1997, was appointed as adviser to King Salman with the rank of minister.

=== Early reforms ===
One of the first things the King and his son, Mohammed bin Salman, did was to streamline the government bureaucracy. On the death of King Abdullah, there were as many as eleven government secretariats, and all of these were abolished and reconstituted as only two, the Council of Political and Security Affairs (CPSA), headed by Deputy Crown prince Mohammed bin Nayef, and the Council for Economic and Development Affairs (CEDA), headed by the Secretary-General of the Royal Court, Prince Mohammed bin Salman, who was given free rein to completely reorganize the government and cement the power of the Sudairi faction, to which both princes belong.

=== Yemen military intervention ===
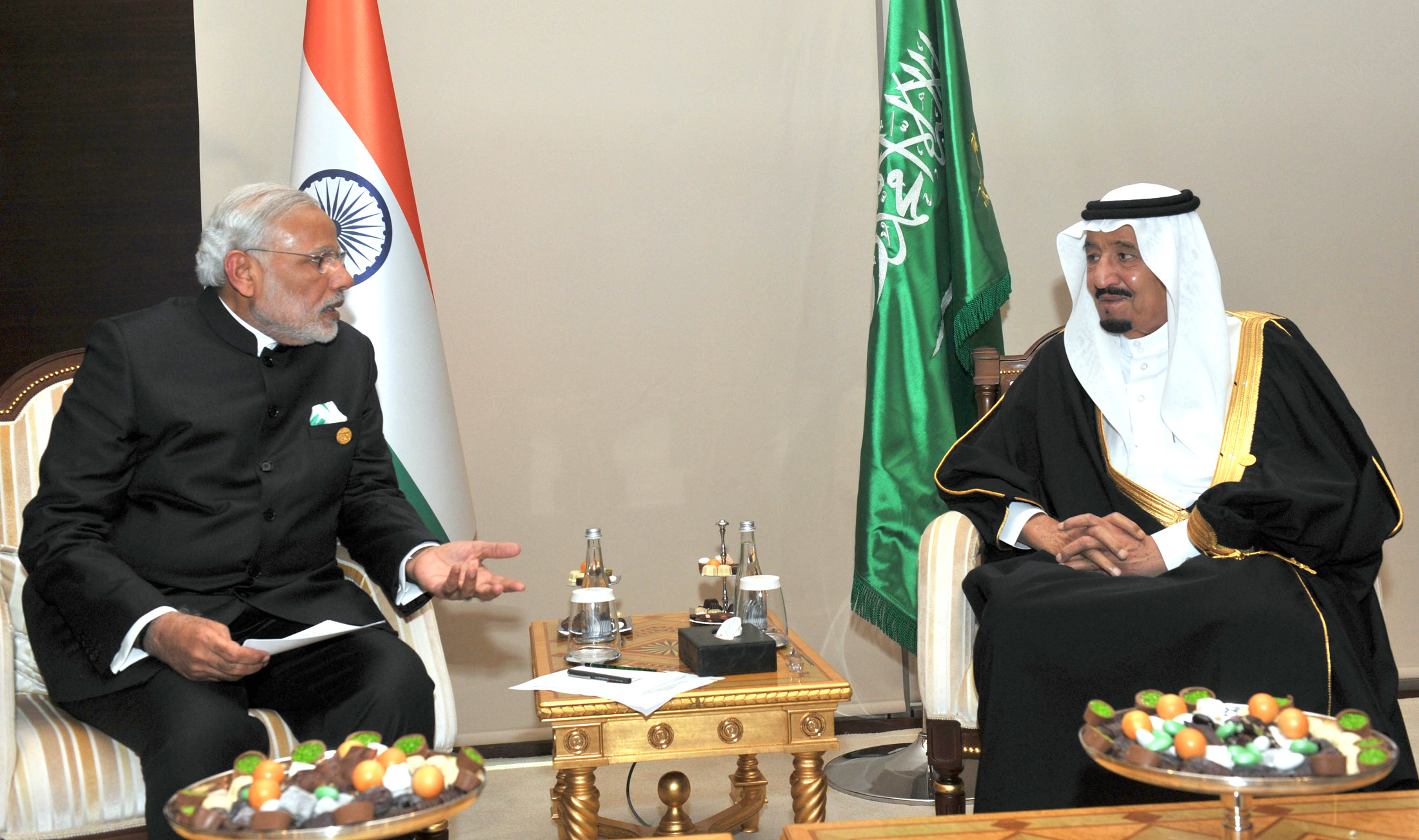
King Salman and Narendra Modi of India, 16 November 2015

In March 2015, the king ordered the bombing of Yemen and military intervention against the Shia Houthis and forces loyal to former President Ali Abdullah Saleh, who was deposed in the 2011 uprising. He first put together a coalition of ten Sunni Muslim countries. Code-named Operation Decisive Storm, this was the first time the Saudi Air Force had launched airstrikes against another country since the 1990–91 Gulf War.

According to Farea Al-Muslim, direct war crimes have been committed during the conflict; for example, an IDP camp was hit by a Saudi airstrike. Human Rights Watch (HRW) wrote that the Saudi-led air campaign had conducted airstrikes in apparent violation of the laws of war. Human rights groups have also criticized Saudi Arabia for the alleged use of cluster bombs against Yemeni civilians. In 2022, Saudi airstrikes at a prison in Northern Yemen killed at least 70 people and knocked out the country's internet access. The UN estimated that by the end of the year 2021, the death toll of the war on Yemen had reached 377,000 people and could reach 1.3 million people by 2030.

=== Crown Prince changes ===
In April 2015, three months after becoming king, Salman appointed a full nephew, Muhammad bin Nayef, as the new Crown Prince to replace his youngest brother Prince Muqrin. Furthermore, he made his son, Mohammed bin Salman, the Deputy Crown Prince. Almost all powers under the king were concentrated in the hands of the crown prince and deputy crown prince, both of whom held the portfolio determining all security and economic development issues in Saudi Arabia.

King Salman then removed Muhammad bin Nayef from the line of succession to the Saudi throne on 21 June 2017 and designated his son Mohammed bin Salman as the new crown prince. At the same time, King Salman removed Muhammad bin Nayef from his other positions in the Saudi government. Mohammad bin Salman has been described as the power behind the throne.

=== KSRelief ===
In May 2015, the King Salman Center for Relief and Humanitarian Aid (KSRelief) was established to deliver aid internationally to victims of civil war and natural disaster, working with the UN and other agencies. As of June 2018, KSRelief has implemented more than 400 individual projects in 40 countries at a cost of $1.8 billion. Moreover, in 2018, KSRelief assisted 180,555 Syrian patients living in Zataari Syrian refugees camp in Jordan. In 2019, KSRelief signed a memorandum of cooperation with UNICEF that aims at enhancing cooperation in the humanitarian field, exchanging knowledge, sharing experiences, promoting voluntary work and boosting capacity building programs. Until 2019, the center provided 1,839 Yemeni civilians wounded during the war with prosthetic limbs for a total amount of $2.3 million.

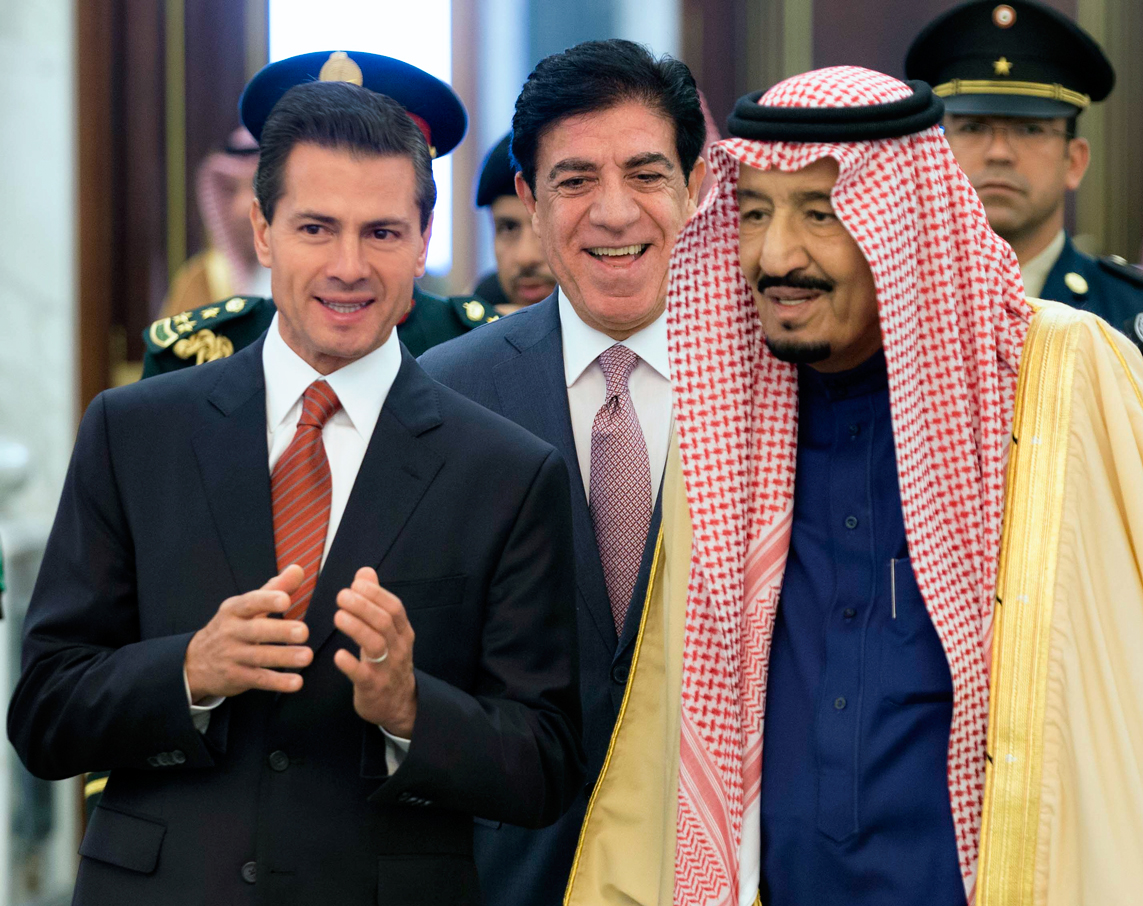
Enrique Peña Nieto and King Salman in 2016

In its ongoing efforts to support the people of Yemen, KSRelief organized a vocational training program to train women in Yemen to enable them to earn money for themselves and their families. In a similar context, under the umbrella of the UN, KSRelief has led an international team to implement a rehabilitation project for the children affected by war in Yemen. Moreover, as part of the 40th session of the UN Human Rights Council, KSRelief organized an event entitled: Children and the Humanitarian Crisis in Yemen where it presented a number of facts and figures related to the amount of assistance provided by the center to the people of Yemen. This includes the implementation of 328 projects for an amount of $2 billion. Furthermore, in 2018 alone, KSRelief provided medical services to 2,501,897 Yemenis.

In 2019, KSRelief signed a number of agreements with different civil society organizations to implement relief projects for the benefit of Palestinian and Syrian refugees as well as the host Lebanese community. KSRelief signed an agreement with the UNHCR to support the families affected by war for an amount of $5 million. Another agreement with IOM was signed to help Syrian refugees under the poverty line for an amount of $3.8 million.

In 2020, KSRelief confirmed that it will be rebuilding the camp of Syrian refugees that had been destroyed during the fighting of local youth and camp residents. They also covered the needs of the refugees.

In 2021, KSRelief and UNESCO planned to launch the Kodrat project which aims to support Lebanon teachers through the creation of an online self-learning platform. At an estimated cost of $887,000, the one-year project will directly train about 1,000 teachers and 50 trainers from 100 Lebanese public schools affected by the Beirut explosion.

In 2022, KSRelief continued its relief efforts to ensure food security for refugees in Lebanon, Sudan, Bangladesh, and Yemen.

In 2023, KSRelief provided treatment services to people of Yemen. In 2024, KSRelief continued its food security project in Sudan to aid more than 4,000 individuals. It also carried out humanitarian projects in Lebanon and Indonesia.

=== Human rights ===
In February 2012, Ali Mohammed Baqir al-Nimr was arrested for participating in, and encouraging, pro-democracy protests, when he was 16 or 17 years old. In May 2014, Ali Al-Nimr was sentenced to be executed, despite the minimum age for execution being 18 when a crime is committed. Ali Al-Nimr has reported being tortured in detention. He was later released in 2021.

In February 2015, a man from Hafar al-Batin was sentenced to death for rejecting the religion of Islam. In June 2015, Saudi Arabia's Supreme Court upheld the sentence of 1,000 lashes and 10 years in prison for Raif Badawi, a Saudi Arabian blogger who was imprisoned in 2012 after being charged for 'insulting Islam'.

In April 2020, the Saudi Supreme Court stated under a royal decree made by King Salman that minors who commit crimes will no longer face execution, but would be sentenced to imprisonment in a juvenile detention facility for a maximum of 10 years.

=== Iran and Syria ===
In 2015, US Defense Secretary Ashton Carter met with King Salman and his Arabian military counterpart, Deputy Crown Prince Mohammed bin Salman, at Jeddah to answer regional security concerns in the Kingdom and the Gulf states over lifting Iranian economic and conventional military sanctions as the Joint Comprehensive Plan of Action outlines. The King has misgivings over the deal since it would increase the regional power of Iran especially in the proxy conflicts in Syria, Yemen, and elsewhere. In January 2016, Saudi Arabia executed the prominent Saudi Shia cleric Sheikh Nimr. Iran warned that the House of Saud would pay a high price for the execution of Sheikh Nimr by God's will.

Saudi Arabia has emerged as the main group to finance and arm the rebels fighting against the Syrian government. Saudi Arabia openly backed the Army of Conquest, an umbrella rebel group that reportedly included an al-Qaeda linked al-Nusra Front and another Salafi coalition known as Ahrar al-Sham.

In May 2019, leaders of Gulf and Arab states held two emergency summits in Mecca to present a united front to Iran. Salman accused Iran of threatening global oil supplies and shipping at a meeting of Arab leaders that called on the international community to confront Tehran following attacks on shipping and rising tensions in the oil-rich region. Salman said "what the Iranian regime is doing, from intervening in regional countries' affairs and developing its nuclear program, threatening global maritime traffic and global oil supplies, is a blatant violation of the treaties and principles of the United Nations." He urged the international community should "use all means to deter this regime."

=== Normalization of ties with Israel ===
In the late 2010s and early 2020s under King Salman, Saudi Arabia engaged in attempts to normalize relations with Israel. Saudi Arabia engaged in such efforts in order to forge a defensive alliance against Iranian threats against Saudi Arabia, either directly or indirectly through Iranian proxies such as the Houthis in Yemen.

=== Panama Papers revelations ===
King Salman has been implicated in the Panama Papers leaks, with two companies originating in the British Virgin Islands taking mortgages in excess of US$34 million to purchase property in central London. His role has not been specified. The then-Crown Prince Muhammad bin Nayef has also been named in association with the Papers.

=== Later reforms ===
Further government reforms took place in June 2018, when Salman replaced the labor and Islamic affairs ministers. The appointment of businessman Ahmed al-Rajhi as labor minister signalled a growing role for private sector expertise in the Saudi government. The new minister for Islamic affairs, Abdullatif al-Alsheikh, had previously been credited with reining in the power of the religious police. At the same time Salman ordered the establishment of the Ministry of Culture, with responsibility for delivering Saudi Vision 2030's cultural goals; and the Council of Royal Reserves, tasked with environmental protection.

In September 2022, the King resigned from the post of prime minister, handing this role to his son Mohammed.

== Influence ==
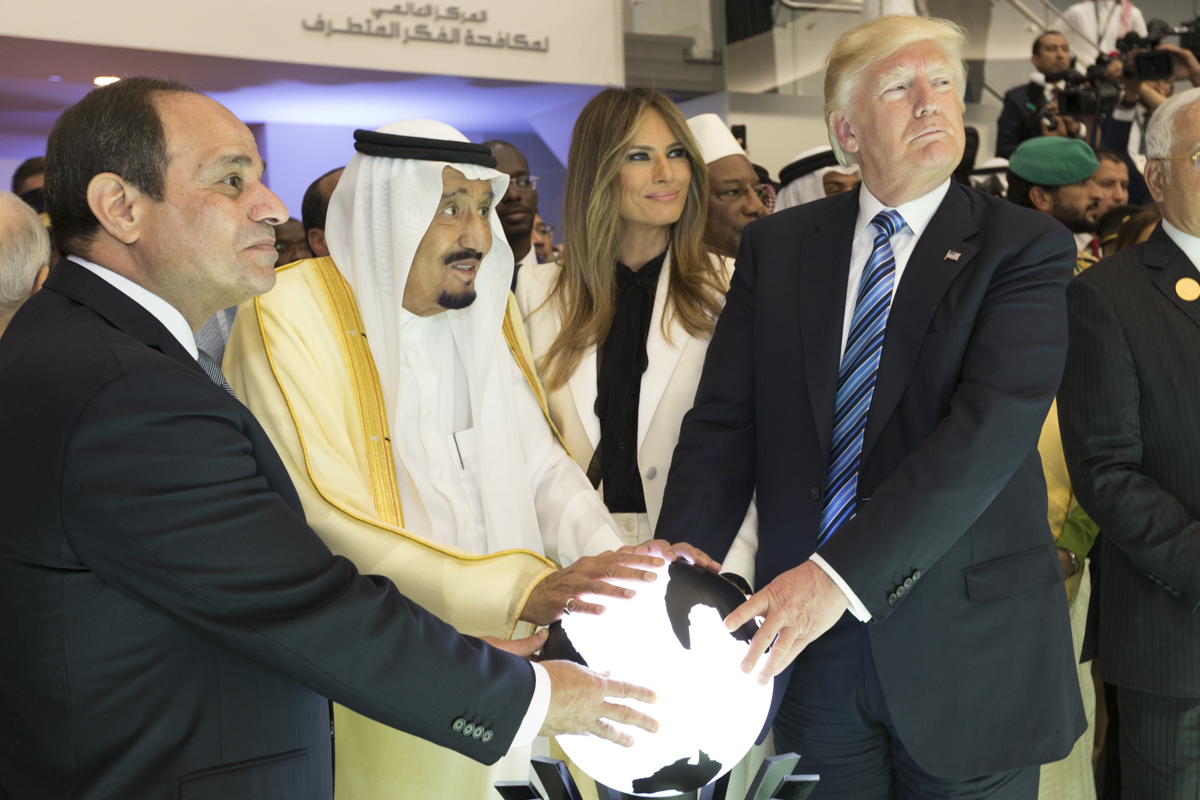
Salman, US President Donald Trump, and Egyptian President Abdel Fattah el-Sisi touching a glowing globe at the 2017 Riyadh summit

Salman was often a mediator in settling royal conflicts among the extended Al Saud family – estimated at 4,000 princes. He was a prominent figure of the royal council, which allowed him to select which princes would be delegated which responsibilities of the Kingdom.

Salman and his family own a media group, including pan-Arab daily Asharq Al-Awsat and Al Eqtisadiah. Though he owns only ten percent of the Saudi Research and Marketing Group (SRMG), he is often referred by auditors as its owner. He reportedly controlled the organization through his son Prince Faisal, who is a former chairman of the concern. The SRMG publishes such daily papers as Arab News, Asharq Al-Awsat and Al Eqtisadiah through its subsidiary Saudi Research and Publishing Company (SRPC).

In a similar vein, Salman is reported to have some strong alliances with significant journalists. He is said to be close to Al Arabiya TV director and Asharq Al-Awsat journalist Abdelrahman Al Rashid and to Othman Al Omeir, who launched and is the owner of the liberal e-newspaper Elaph. King Salman is thought to have connections with the Elaph website.

In November 2026, Salman and Crown Prince Mohammed bin Salman shared the top ranking on The 500 Most Influential Muslims list compiled by the Royal Islamic Strategic Studies Centre, alongside Pakistan's Prime Minister Shehbaz Sharif and Chief of Defence Forces Asim Munir, and Turkish President Recep Tayyip Erdogan.

== Views ==
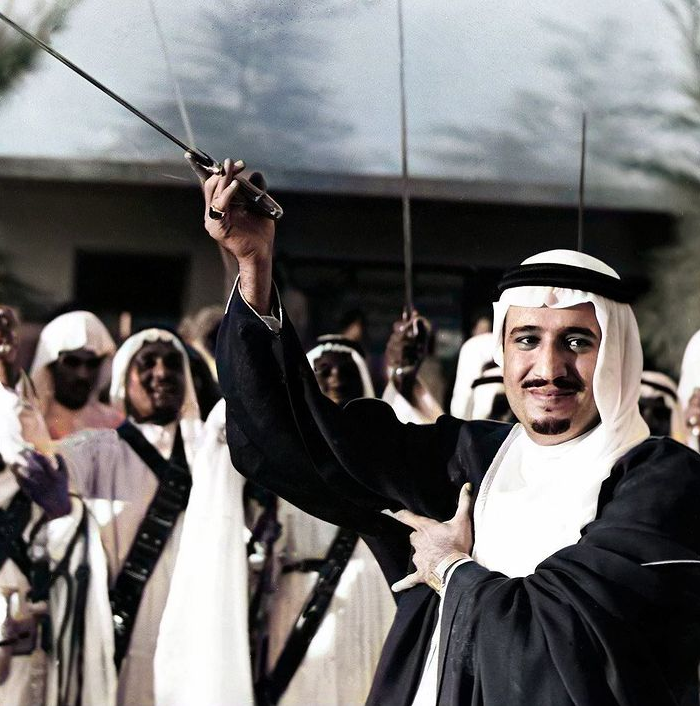
Prince Salman takes part in the Saudi Arabian traditional dance in the 1960s.

Salman holds traditional views with regard to political reforms and social change. In November 2002, in reference to charitable organizations accused of terrorism (e.g. al-Haramain Foundation, Saudi High Commission for Relief of Bosnia and Herzegovina), he stated that he had personally taken part in the activities of such organizations, but added "I know the assistance goes to doing good. But if there are those who change some work of charity into evil activities, then it is not the Kingdom's responsibility, nor its people, which helps its Arab and Muslim brothers around the world."

== Personal life ==
=== Marriages and issue ===
Salman bin Abdulaziz has reportedly been married at least three times. Reliable sources differ on the number of his children: while The Telegraph has reported that he has at least 13 children, CNN states that the exact number is not publicly available.

Salman's first wife was his first cousin Sultana bint Turki Al Sudairi, daughter of his maternal uncle Turki bin Ahmad Al Sudairi, a former governor of Asir Province. They were married in 1954, when Salman was 18 years old and Sultana was 13 or 14. She gave birth to six children, including his only known daughter. Two adult sons died during the couple's lifetimes. Sultana died on 30 July 2011. Their children were:

- Prince Fahd (1955–2001). Salman was only 19 years old when he became a father with the birth of Fahd in 1955. Fahd married a cousin and was the father of four children. A businessman and horse-breeder, he died of heart failure aged 47 in July 2001. After his death, his mother extended generous patronage in his memory to an existing, struggling charity, which then renamed itself The Prince Fahd bin Salman Charitable Society for the Care of Kidney Patients. Fahd's brother Abdulaziz has taken over patronage of that charity after the death of their mother.
- Prince Sultan (born 1956). He became the first person of royal blood, the first Arab, and first Muslim to fly to outer space when he flew aboard the Space Shuttle Discovery (STS-51-G) in June 1985. Sultan bin Salman is currently the chairman of the Saudi Space Commission. Prince Sultan bin Salman was formerly the chairman of the Saudi Commission for Tourism and Antiquities (SCTA), which later was changed to be the Ministry of Tourism.
- Prince Ahmed (1958–2002), died of a heart attack in July 2002 aged 43.
- Prince Abdulaziz (b. 1960). He served as the deputy minister of oil since 1995 until 2019 when he became the minister of Energy.
- Prince Faisal (b. 1970). He was the governor of Madinah province from 2013 to 2023.
- Princess Hassa (b. 1974), Salman's only known daughter. On 28 May 2021, she was married to a cousin, Fahd bin Saad Al Saud, at the Royal Sea Place in Jeddah.

Salman's second wife was Sarah bint Faisal Al Subai'ai, whom he divorced. The relatively brief marriage produced one son:

- Prince Saud (b. 1986).

Salman's third wife is Fahda bint Falah Al Hithlain, granddaughter of Rakan bin Hithlain and great-granddaughter of Dhaydan bin Hithlain, leaders of the Al Ajman tribe. U.S. intelligence officials believe that King Salman has been kept apart from Princess Fahda for several years, on the orders of their son Prince Mohammed bin Salman. She has six sons with Salman:

- Prince Mohammed (b. 1985), Crown Prince and Prime Minister of Saudi Arabia. He was Salman's private adviser at the Ministry of Defense and at the Crown Prince Court. Upon Salman's accession to the throne in January 2015, he was appointed minister of defense and head of the royal court. Later he was named crown prince.
- Prince Turki (b. 1987). He became the chairman of the Saudi Research and Marketing Group in February 2013, replacing his elder half-brother Faisal.
- Prince Khalid (b. 1988), Minister of Defense of Saudi Arabia since 2022
- Prince Nayef
- Prince Bandar
- Prince Rakan

=== Personality ===
Salman was the closest brother to Crown Prince Sultan, having remained at his side during his constant illness and recovery in New York City and Morocco, from 2008 to 2011. Prince Sultan described him as "the prince of loyalty" in a letter sent to him. Salman was also King Fahd's most trusted adviser during his reign.

His legal counsel was William Jeffress Jr., of U.S.-based firm Baker Botts LLP, in a lawsuit filed by families of victims of the September 11 attacks from 2002 to 2010.

Salman received the Lifetime Achievement Award of the Al-Turath Charity Foundation in the field of urban heritage in 2013. In 2017, Salman pledged US$15,000,000 for Rohingya Muslim refugees in Bangladesh.

=== Health ===
In August 2010, Salman underwent spinal surgery in the United States and remained out of the kingdom for recovery. He has had one stroke and, despite receiving physiotherapy, his left arm does not work as well as his right. It has been reported that Salman has mild vascular dementia, in addition to reports of Alzheimer's dementia.

In July 2020, King Salman underwent successful gallbladder surgery.

In May 2024, it was reported that King Salman had a lung infection and would be taking antibiotics.

== Honours ==
Country	Collar	Order	Year	Ref.
Bahrain		Collar of the Order of Sheikh Isa bin Salman Al Khalifa	2017	
Brunei		Royal Family Order of the Crown of Brunei (D.K.M.B.)	2017	
Djibouti		Grand Cordon of the Order of National Star of Djibouti	2015	
Egypt		Collar of the Order of the Nile	2016	
Guinea		Grand Cordon of the National Order of Merit	2015	
Indonesia		First Class of the Star of the Republic of Indonesia	2017	
Japan		Grand Cordon of the Order of the Chrysanthemum	2017	
Jordan		Collar of the Order of Al-Hussein bin Ali	2017	
Kazakhstan		Grand Collar of the Order of the Golden Eagle	2022	
Kuwait		Collar of the Order of Mubarak the Great	2016	
Kuwait		Collar of the Order of Kuwait	2016	
Malaysia		Honorary Commander of the Order of the Defender of the Realm (P.M.N.)	1982	
Malaysia		Recipient of the Most Exalted Order of the Crown of the Realm (D.M.N.)	2017	
Mexico		Collar of the Order of the Aztec Eagle	2016	
Morocco	Ribbon Wissam al Mohamadi Morocco	Collar of the Order of Muhammad	2016	
Morocco		Grand Cordon of the Order of Ouissam Alaouite	1987	
Niger		Grand Cross of the National Order of Niger	2015	
Pakistan		First Class of the Nishan-e-Pakistan	2015	
Oman		Grand Cordon with Collar of the Order of Al Said	2021	
Palestine		Grand Collar of the State of Palestine	2015	
Senegal		Grand Cordon of the National Order of Merit	1999	
Sierra Leone		Collar of the Order of the Republic	2017	
Spain		Grand Cross of the Order of Civil Merit	1974	
Tunisia		Grand Cordon of the Order of the Republic	2019	
Turkey		Collar of the Order of the State of Republic of Turkey	2016	
Yemen		Grand Cordon of the Order of the Republic	2001	
UAE		Collar of the Order of Zayed	2016	
Ukraine		Collar of the Order of Prince Yaroslav the Wise	2017	

== Ancestry ==
Ancestors of Salman of Saudi Arabia

8. Faisal bin Turki bin Abdullah Al Saud
4. Abdul Rahman bin Faisal
9. Sara bint Mishari bin Abdulrahman bin Hassan Al Saud
2. Abdulaziz ibn Saud
10. Ahmed Al Kabir bin Mohammed bin Turki Al Sudairi
5. Sara bint Ahmed Al Sudairi
1. Salman bin Abdulaziz Al Saud
12. Muhammed bin Ahmed Al Kabir Al Sudairi
6. Ahmed bin Muhammed Al Sudairi
3. Hassa bint Ahmed Al Sudairi
14. Ali bin Mohammed Al Suwaidi
7. Sharifa bint Ali bin Mohammed Al Suwaidi

== See also ==
- List of rulers of Saudi Arabia
- List of things named after Saudi Kings § Salman
- Succession to the Saudi Arabian throne
- List of heads of former ruling families

Salman House of Saud Born: 31 December 1935
Regnal titles
Preceded by Abdullah	King of Saudi Arabia; 2015–present	Incumbent; Heir apparent: Mohammed bin Salman
Saudi Arabian royalty
Preceded by Nayef bin Abdulaziz	Crown Prince of Saudi Arabia; 2012–2015	Succeeded by Muqrin bin Abdulaziz
Political offices
Preceded by Abdullah	Prime Minister of Saudi Arabia; 2015–2022	Succeeded by Mohammed bin Salman
Preceded by Badr bin Saud	Governor of Riyadh Region; 1963–2011	Succeeded by Sattam bin Abdulaziz
Preceded by Sultan bin Abdulaziz	Minister of Defense; 2011–2015	Succeeded by Mohammed bin Salman
