= Descendants of Ibn Saud =

Abdulaziz bin Abdul Rahman Al Saud (1875–1953), the founder and first king of Saudi Arabia, also called Ibn Saud, was young when he first married. However, his wife died shortly after their marriage. Ibn Saud remarried at eighteen and his firstborn child was Prince Turki I. He had 45 sons of whom 36 survived to adulthood and had children of their own. He also had many daughters. He is thought to have had 22 wives.

== Wives and their children ==
This is a list of the first generation of offspring of Ibn Saud, of which there are 72, sorted by his numerous wives. Many of the sons of Ibn Saud served in prominent leadership positions in Saudi Arabia including all of the nation's monarchs since his death. Those who served as King are in bold.

=== Wadha bint Muhammad Al Orair ===
Wadha bint Muhammad Al Orair (died 4 May 1969) was the daughter of Muhammed and Abta Sardah. She belonged to the Bani Khalid tribe, which ruled Eastern Arabia for a long time and was the most powerful tribe in this region during the late 18th century.

Some reports state she is from the Qahtan tribe. Wahda married Abdulaziz in Kuwait in 1896, and they had at least five children: Prince Turki, King Saud, Prince Khalid, Prince Abdullah and Princess Mounira.

Her children were:

Name	Lifespan	Notes
Turki (I)	c. 1900–1919	Nominal heir in Riyadh and Najd. Died young due to the Spanish influenza epidemic.
**Saud**	12 January 1902 – 23 February 1969	Crown Prince from 1932; **King (1953–1964),** Deposed and exiled.
Khalid (I)		
Mounira		She married her first cousin Fahd, the son of her paternal uncle Sa'ad bin Abdul Rahman Al Saud and her stepmother's daughter. She also married Khalid bin Muhammad bin Abd al Rahman Al Abd al Rahman, the son of her uncle and her stepmother's sister Sara bint Abdullah Al Sheikh. He died in 1972.
Noura		
Abdullah		

Of them, Prince Khalid and Prince Abdullah died young.

Wadha's sister, Hussa, first married the Kuwaiti ruler Mubarak Al Sabah and then, following her divorce from Mubarak, she also married Abdulaziz. In her lifetime Wadha witnessed the death of her five children. She died in Riyadh on 4 May 1969, shortly after the death of King Saud in Athens.

=== Tarfa bint Abdullah Al Sheikh ===
Tarfa was a member of the Al Sheikh clan, born in 1884. Her father was Abdullah bin Abdullatif. She married Ibn Saud in 1902 and had at least five children with him.

Name	Lifespan	Notes
Khalid (II)	(born 1903, died in 1904)	
**Faisal**	(April 1906 – 25 March 1975)	Prime Minister and Regent prior to deposing his brother; **King (1964–1975);** murdered.
Saad (I)	(1902–1919)	Robert Lacey in his book The Kingdom states that Princess Hussa mothered Saad. (p. 174 and p. 526) Also reported by other sources.
Noura	(1904–1938)	She married her half first cousin Khalid, the son of her paternal half uncle Muhammad bin Abdul Rahman Al Saud

=== Lulua bint Salih Al Dakhil ===
Ibn Saud and Lulua had one child.

Name	Lifespan	Notes
Fahd (I)	(1906–1919)	

=== Al Jawhara bint Musaed Al Jiluwi ===
Al-Jawhara was reputedly Ibn Saud's favorite wife, whose early death in 1919 (due to the Spanish influenza epidemic) was deeply mourned by him. In 1951, more than 30 years after her death, Ibn Saud is reported to have said that he had had many wives, but his only love had been Al Jawhara. Ibn Saud and Al Jawhara bint Musaed Al Jiluwi had three children.

Name	Lifespan	Notes
Muhammad	(1910–1988)	nicknamed Abu Al-Sharayn ("Father of the two evils"); held many ministries under his father and older brother Saud. Led revolt against Saud and was briefly de jure Crown Prince before ceding the job to his full brother Khalid.
**Khalid (III)**	(13 February 1913 – 13 June 1982)	Crown Prince 1965—75; **King 1975–1982**
Al Anoud		

=== Lajah bint Khalid bin Hithlain ===
Ibn Saud and Lajah had one child.

Name	Lifespan	Notes
Sara	(1916 – June 2003)	

=== Bazza (I) ===
Bazza (I) was a Moroccan woman. Ibn Saud and Bazza had at least one child.

Name	Lifespan	Notes
Nasser	(1911–1984)	He was excluded from all positions due to a scandal during his governorship.

=== Jawhara bint Saad bin Abdul Muhsin Al Sudairi ===
Jawhara bint Saad Al Sudairi was the sister of Haya bint Saad Al Sudairi, who was another wife of Ibn Saud. While Jawhara and Haya are sisters hailing from the al-Sudairi family, they are not sisters of Hussa al-Sudairi, who is the mother of the "Sudairi Seven" (see below). Jawhara bore Ibn Saud the following children:

Name	Lifespan	Notes
Sa'ad (II)	(1915–1994)	Bypassed for the throne, given the chairmanship of the royal family council of Al Saud (precursor of Allegiance Council) as consolation prize.
Musa'id	(1923–2013)	Disgraced when his son murdered King Faisal. Bypassed from succession.
Abdul Mohsin/Muhsin	(1925–1985)	Took part in the Free Princes Movement, hence disqualified from succession
Al Bandari	(1928–2008)	

=== Hussa Al Sudairi ===
Ibn Saud and Hussa had eleven surviving children, being seven sons and four daughters; two other children may have died in infancy. Their seven sons are known as the "Sudairi Seven," a powerful group of full brothers. Two of their sons became kings of Saudi Arabia. Their children were:

1. Sa'ad (I); Robert Lacey in his book The Kingdom states that Princess Hussa actually mothered Sa'ad which is also said by other sources. He was born in 1913 and died in 1919 during the Spanish flu pandemic.
2. **Fahd (II)** (1921 – 1 August 2005); **King (1982–2005)**
3. Sultan (1928–2011); Crown Prince (2005–2011)
4. Luluwah (ca. 1928–2008); eldest daughter
5. Abdul Rahman (1931–2017); Deputy Minister of Defense and Aviation (1978–2011), removed from Succession.
6. Nayef (1933–2012); Crown Prince (27 October 2011 – 16 June 2012)
7. Turki (II) (1934–2016); Deputy Defense Minister (1969–78), removed from Succession.
8. **Salman** (born 31 December 1935); **King (2015–present),** Prime Minister (23 January 2015 - 27 September 2022)
9. Ahmed (born 1942); Deputy Minister of the Interior (1975–2012) and briefly as Minister of the Interior in 2012, removed from Succession.
10. Latifa (daughter; died 2024)
11. Al Jawhara II (daughter; died 2023)
12. Jawahir (daughter; died 2015)
13. Moudhi (died young)
14. Felwa (died young)

=== Shahida ===
Shahida (died 1938) was an Armenian woman who was reportedly the favorite wife of Ibn Saud. Ibn Saud and Shahida had four children.

1. Mansour (1921 – 2 May 1951); The king's favorite son. Minister of Defense, died from kidney failure in Paris.
2. Misha'al (1926 – 3 May 2017); Minister of Defense.
3. Qumash (1927 – September 2011)
4. Mutaib (1931–2019); Minister of Municipal and Rural Affairs (1980 to 2009).
5. Salman (Died as an infant).

=== Fahda bint Asi bin Shuraim Al Shammari ===
She was the widow of Saud bin Abdulaziz Al Rashid, tenth Emir of the Rashidi Emirate which was overthrown by Ibn Saud. By her former husband, Fahda was the mother of at least two sons. She bore three children to Ibn Saud, and died when the eldest among them, the future king Abdullah, was only six years old. Her children with Ibn Saud were:

1. **Abdullah** (1 August 1924 – 23 January 2015); **King (2005–2015)**
2. Nouf (died August 2015)
3. Seeta (c. 1930 – 13 April 2011); initiated the Princesses' Council

=== Bazza (II) ===
Bazza died in 1940 and was Moroccan.

1. Bandar (1923–2019)
2. Fawwaz (1934–2008) - took part in the Free Princes Movement, hence disqualified from succession
3. Mishari

=== Haya bint Saad Al Sudairi ===
Haya bint Saad (1913 – 18 April 2003) was the sister of Jawhara bint Saad Al-Sudairi, another wife of Ibn Saud. However, she and Jawhara were not sisters of Hussa Al-Sudairi, yet another wife of Al-Saud and mother of the "Sudairi Seven." Haya bore Ibn Saud the following children:

1. Badr (I) (1931–1932)
2. Badr (II) (1933 – 1 April 2013) - took part in the Free Princes Movement, hence disqualified from succession
3. Huzza (1951 – July 2000)
4. Abdul Ilah (born 1939)
5. Abdul Majeed (1943–2007)
6. Noura (1930 – 23 March 2026)
7. Mishail

=== Bushra ===
Name	Lifespan	Notes
Mishari	(1932 – 23 May 2000)	

=== Munaiyir ===
Munaiyir (c. 1909 – December 1991) was an Armenian woman

1. Talal (I) (1924–1927)
2. Talal (II) (15 August 1931 – 22 December 2018)
3. Nawwaf (16 August 1932 – 29 September 2015) - took part in the Free Princes Movement, hence disqualified from succession
4. Madawi (1939 – November 2017)

=== Mudhi ===
Mudhi was an Armenian woman.

1. Sultana (c. 1928 – 7 July 2008)
2. Haya (c. 1929 – 2 November 2009)
3. Majid (II) (9 October 1938 – 12 April 2003)
4. Sattam (21 January 1941 – 12 February 2013)

=== Nouf bint Nawwaf Al Shalan ===
Nouf and Ibn Saud married in November 1935. She was the granddaughter of the tribal chief Nuri Al Shalaan. Her sister married Crown Prince Saud in April 1936.

1. Thamir (1937 – 27 June 1958)
2. Mamdouh (1940 – 30 November 2023)
3. Mashhur (born 1942)

=== Saida al Yamaniyah ===
Saida was a Yemeni woman, hence her title al Yamaniyah.

1. Hathloul (1942 – 29 September 2012)

=== Baraka Al Yamaniyah ===
1. Muqrin (born 15 September 1945); Crown Prince (23 January 2015— 29 April 2015)

=== Futayma ===
1. Hamoud (1947 – February 1994)

=== Mudhi bint Abdullah Almandeel Al Khalidi ===
Mudhi was from Bani Khalid

1. Shaikha (born 1922)

=== Aliyah Fakeer ===
1. Majid (I) (1939–1940)
2. Abdul Saleem (1941–1942)
3. Jiluwi (I) (1942–1944)
4. Jiluwi (II) (1952–1952); the youngest son of Ibn Saud but died as an infant.

== Grandchildren ==
Ibn Saud has approximately a thousand grandchildren. The following is a select list of notable grandsons in the male line.

=== Patrilineal grandsons ===
- Abdullah bin Khalid – Chairman of the King Khalid Foundation.
- Badr bin Mohammed – Member of Allegiance council.
- Khalid Al Faisal (born 1940) – poet, governor of the Makkah Province (2007–2013) and (2015—present) and managing director of the King Faisal Foundation. Minister of education between December 2013 and January 2015.
- Mishaal bin Saud (born 1940) – Governor of Najran Province (1997–2008) and chairman of the Tourism Enterprises company
- Muhammad bin Saad (born 1944) – Former deputy governor of Al Qassim province and former deputy governor of Riyadh Province.
- Mohammad bin Nasser (born 1944) – Governor of Jizan Region (2001—present).
- Faisal bin Bandar (born 1945) – Former governor of Al-Qassim Province (1992–2015); governor of Riyadh Province (2015—present).
- Turki Al Faisal (born 1945) – Head of Saudi Arabia's General Intelligence Directorate from 1977 to 2001. Former ambassador to the US until December 2006. Member of the board of trustees for the King Faisal Foundation.
- Mansour bin Saud Al Saud (born 1947) – Commander of the National Guard (1961–1963). Chief of the royal court (1963–1964). Businessman
- Saud bin Abdul Mohsin (born 1947) – Governor of Ha'il Province (1999–2017), Saudi Ambassador to Portugal (2021—present)
- Fahd bin Badr – Former Governor of Al Jawf Region (2002–2018). Advisor to King Salman since 2018.
- Khalid bin Sultan (born 1949) – Deputy minister of defense from November 2011 to 20 April 2013. Chair of board of trustees of Sultan bin Abdulaziz Al Saud Foundation.
- Bandar bin Sultan (born 1949) – Former long-serving ambassador to the US; secretary-general of the National Security Council from October 2005 to January 2015 and director-general of the Saudi Intelligence Agency from 19 July 2012 to 2014.
- Muhammad bin Fahd (born January 1950) – Former governor of the Eastern Province (1987 – 13 January 2013).
- Khaled bin Abdullah bin Abdulaziz Al Saud (born 1950) – Member of the Allegiance Council.
- Saud bin Fahd (born 8 October 1950) – Former vice director of the Saudi Intelligence Agency.
- Fahd bin Sultan (born 1950) – Governor of Tabuk Province (1987—present).
- Sultan bin Fahd (born 1951) – Former president of youth welfare.
- Khalid bin Bandar (born 1951) – Former governor of Riyadh Province (2013–2014).
- Faisal bin Sultan (born 1951) – secretary general of Sultan bin Abdulaziz al Saud foundation.
- Mansour bin Bandar – Air Base commander.
- Turki bin Bandar — commander of the Royal Saudi Air Force since 2018.
- Mansour bin Mutaib (born 1952) – Former minister of municipal and rural affairs (2009–2015). Minister of State since 2015.
- Mutaib bin Abdullah (born 1952) – Commander of the national guard (2010–2012) and minister of national guard May 2013-November 2017.
- Faisal bin Thamir (born 1953) – Member of Allegiance Council, whose father died before 1960.
- Salman bin Saud Al Saud (born 1953) businessman and writer
- Mohammed bin Nawwaf (born 1953) – Saudi ambassador to Italy and Malta (1995–2004) and ambassador to the United Kingdom and Ireland (2005–2018).
- Faisal bin Khalid (born 1954) – Governor of Asir Province (2007–2018), chairman of the King Khalid Foundation, and a member of the Allegiance Council.
- Mishari bin Saud (born 1954) – Governor of Al Bahah Province (2010–2017).
- Al-Waleed bin Talal (born 1955) – Investor
- Saud bin Nayef (born 1956) – Governor of Eastern Province (2013—present); former head of the Court of Crown Prince (2011 – 13 January 2013), former Saudi ambassador to Spain and deputy governor of the Eastern Province.
- Saif al-Islam bin Saud Al Saud (born 1956) professor at King Saud University.
- Sultan bin Salman (born 1956) – Former astronaut (1985), secretary general of the supreme commission for tourism since 2000, and chairman of the Board of Directors of the Saudi Space Commission with the rank of minister since 2018.
- Mishaal bin Majid (born 1957) – Jeddah governor since 1997.
- Khalid bin Turki (born 1957). — eldest son of Prince Turki II
- Khalid bin Fahd (born 1958). — fifth son of King Fahd, philanthropist
- Muhammad bin Nayef (born 1959) – Minister of Interior from 5 November 2012 to June 2017 and Crown Prince from 29 April 2015 to June 2017.
- Fahd bin Turki (born 1959) Commander of Army Ground Forces from April 2017, then of Joint Forces from February 2018 to August 2020
- Abdulaziz bin Majid (born 1960) – Governor of Madinah Province (2005–2013)
- Abdulaziz bin Salman (born 1960) – Petroleum minister (since 2019).
- Hussam bin Saud bin Abdulaziz Al Saud (born 1960) – Chairman of Zain Telecommunication company, Governor of Al Bahah Province (2017—present)
- Abdulaziz bin Bandar (born 1961) – Former Deputy Chief of Intelligence Presidency.
- Khaled bin Talal (born 1962) – Businessman.
- Mansour bin Nasser (born 1962) – advisor to King Abdullah, ambassador to Switzerland (2019–2020)
- Abdulaziz bin Abdullah (born 1962) – Former Deputy Foreign Minister (2011–2015).
- Abdulaziz bin Ahmed (born 1963) – Businessman
- Mohammed bin Bandar (born 1965) — businessman
- Nayef bin Ahmed (born 1965) – former Head of land forces intelligence and security commission
- Bandar bin Musaid – Member of Allegiance Council.
- Abdullah bin Musa'ad bin Abdulaziz Al Saud (born 1965) – former president of Al-Hilal FC
- Abdul Aziz bin Abdul Elah (born 1965) – stakeholder.
- Faisal bin Turki (born 1965) – adviser at the ministry of petroleum and natural resources.
- Abdulrahman bin Musa'ad (born 1967) – former president of Al-Hilal FC
- Turki bin Talal bin Abdul Aziz Al Saud (born 1968) – aviator, governor of the Asir Province (2018—present)
- Sultan bin Turki II bin Abdulaziz Al Saud (born 1968) — oppositionist
- Abdulaziz bin Sa'ad (born 1968) – Governor of Hail Province (2017—present).
- Faisal bin Salman (born 1970) – Governor of Madinah Province (2013–2023) and adviser to King Salman
- Fahd bin Muqrin – Saudi civic leader, and businessman.
- Faisal bin Sattam (born 1970) – Ambassador to Italy since 2017.
- Mishaal bin Abdullah Al Saud (born 1970) – Governor of Najran Province (2009–2013); governor of Makkah province (December 2013-January 2015).
- Turki bin Abdullah Al Saud (born 1971) – Former deputy governor and governor of the Riyadh Province (2014–2015)
- Mohammed bin Abdul Rahman – deputy governor of the Riyadh Province
- Nayef bin Mamdouh bin Abdulaziz Al Saud (born 1971) – Inventor
- Faisal bin Abdullah – former Head of Saudi Arabia Red Crescent society.
- Abdulaziz bin Sattam – Advisor at the Royal Court. He speaks English.
- Abdul Aziz bin Fahd (born 1973) – Former Minister of State.
- Turki bin Muqrin (born 1973) – Businessman.
- Salman bin Sultan (born 1976) – Former deputy defense minister and governor of Madinah province since December 2023.
- Abdulaziz bin Nawwaf (born 1979) – Member of Allegiance Council.
- Badr bin Sultan (born 1980) — Governor of Al Jawf (February–December 2018); Deputy Governor of Mecca (December 2018—December 2023)
- Abdulaziz bin Talal bin Abdulaziz Al Saud (born 1982) — Businessman
- Ahmed bin Sultan (born 1983) — philanthropist, businessman, and composer
- Faisal bin Nawaf (born 1984) — the Governor of Al Jawf (December 2018—present)
- Mohammed bin Salman (born 1985) – Minister of Defense (January 2015-September 2022), Crown Prince since June 2017 and Prime Minister since September 2022.
- Majed bin Abdullah (born 1985) – Convicted of cocaine use.
- Saud bin Salman bin Abdulaziz (born 1986) — Businessman
- Abdullah bin Bandar bin Abdulaziz Al Saud (born 1986) – Minister of the National Guard
- Turki bin Salman (born 1987) – Former chairman of the Saudi Research and Marketing Group.
- Abdullah bin Saad (born 1987) – Poet
- Khalid bin Salman (born 1988) – Ambassador to the United States (2017–2019), Deputy Minister of Defense (2019–2022) and Minister of Defense since September 2022
- Nawwaf bin Nayef (born 1988) – Businessman
- Sultan bin Ahmad Al Saud – ambassador to Bahrain
- Muhammad bin Mishari – Member of Allegiance Council.
- Faisal bin Abdul Majeed – Member of Allegiance Council.
- Abdul-Majid bin Abdul Elah (born 1993) is the president of the Saudi student Union at Northeastern University in Boston
- Sultan bin Abdullah (born 1995) — Businessman
- Bandar bin Salman Al Saud (born 1995) — photographer
- Rakan bin Salman bin Abdulaziz Al Saud (born 1997) – youngest son of King Salman.
- Bandar bin Abdullah bin Abdulaziz Al Saud (born 1999) – youngest son of King Abdullah.

==== Deceased ====
- Faisal bin Turki I bin Abdulaziz Al Saud (1920–1968) – Minister of the interior
- Abdullah bin Faisal Al Saud (1923–2007) – Minister of the Interior and Minister of Health
- Fahd bin Saud (1923–2006) – Minister of Defense.
- Saad bin Saud Al Saud (1924–1977) — Deputy emir of the Northern province (1954–1961) and Asir (1969–1977) and commander of the National Guard (1959–1963)
- Abdullah bin Saud Al Saud (1924–1997) — former Governor of Mecca (1961–1963), Ambassador to Spain (1975–1997)
- Khalid bin Saud (1925–2020) — commander of the National Guard (1957–1959)
- Bandar bin Saud bin Abdulaziz Al Saud (1926–2016) – advisor
- Musaid bin Saud Al Saud (1927–2012) mayor of Tabuk (1937–1941) and (1958–1964), Ambassador to Kuwait (1941–1949), Deputy Minister of defense and aviation (1949–1958), head of the Department for the care of orphans (1964–1998).
- Fahd bin Mohammed (1930–2015) - eldest son of Prince Mohammed, father of Mishaal bint Fahd bin Mohammed Al Saud who was executed for adultery.
- Badr bin Saud bin Abdulaziz Al Saud (1934–2004) – Governor of Riyadh
- Bandar bin Mohammed (1934–2014) — second son of Prince Mohammed
- Mohammed bin Saud (1934–2012) – Governor of Al Bahah Province and Minister of Defense.
- Bandar bin Khalid (1935–2018) – eldest son of King Khalid
- Mohammed bin Faisal (1937–2017) – Deputy minister for agriculture. Founder and chairman of DMI Trust and the Faisal Islamic Bank Group; member of the board of trustees for the King Faisal Foundation.
- Sultan bin Saud (1939–1975) – former president of Al-Nassr
- Saud Al Faisal (1940–2015) – Foreign Minister.
- Abdul Elah bin Saud (1941–2023) Ambassador to Sweden (1964–1968)
- Khalid bin Musaid (1942–1965) – Killed while protesting the introduction of television
- Abdul Rahman bin Faisal (1942–2014) – Military officer and businessman
- Bandar bin Faisal Al Saud (1943–2015) pilot and adviser
- Saad bin Faisal bin Abdulaziz Al Saud (1943-10 Apr 2017) – Deputy of the company Petromin on planning issues
- Faisal bin Musaid (1944–1975) – Assassin of King Faisal
- Faisal bin Fahd (1945–1999) – President of Youth Welfare
- Abdul Rahman bin Saud Al Saud (1946–2004) – President of Al-Nassr
- Mohammed bin Mishaal Al Saud (1947–2005) son of Prince Mishaal
- Abdul Rahman bin Nasser (1947–2022) Governor of Al-Kharj (2001–2021)
- Turki bin Nasser (1948–2021) Former head of the presidency of meteorology and environment (PME). Former state minister for environmental issues in Saudi Arabia.
- Badr bin Abdul-Muhsin (1949–2024) poet.
- Faisal bin Talal Al Saud (1949–1991) – eldest son of Prince Talal
- Muhammad bin Fahd (1950–2025) Former governor of the Eastern Province (1987 – 13 January 2013).
- Talal bin Mansour Al Saud (1950–2023) Member of Allegiance Council.
- Talal bin Saud Al Saud (1952–2020) – sports functionary and the Manager
- Abdul Malik bin Saud Al Saud (1953–2005) philanthropist
- Mashhoor bin Saud bin Abdulaziz Al Saud (1954–2004) – Convicted of cocaine possession
- Fahd bin Salman bin Abdulaziz Al Saud (1955–2001) – Horse owner, businessman
- Yazid bin Saud Al Saud (1955–2023) Director-General of the relations and guidance administration of the Ministry of the interior.
- Ahmed bin Salman bin Abdulaziz Al Saud (1958–2002) – Media executive
- Turki bin Sultan (1959–2012) – Deputy Minister of Culture and Information
- Mansour bin Muqrin (1974–2017) – Advisor at the Crown Prince Court 2015–2017.

=== Granddaughters ===
- Abeer bint Abdullah Al Saud – chairperson of the Asayel Cooperative Society
- Adila bint Abdullah Al Saud – Advocate of women's rights
- Basmah bint Saud (born 1964) – businesswoman
- Dalal bint Saud Al Saud (1957–2021) – honorary board member of the Legacy of Hope Foundation
- Fahda bint Saud (born 1953) – President of the Al Faisaliyah women's welfare society
- Haifa bint Faisal (born 1950) – married Bandar bin Sultan
- Hassa bint Salman Al Saud (born 1974)
- Latifa bint Fahd Al Saud (1959–2013)
- Lolowah bint Faisal Al Saud (born 1948) – Activist, previously married to Saud bin Abdul Muhsin Al Saud
- Maha bint Mishari Al Saud – Alfaisal University faculty and physician
- Moudi bint Khalid Al Saud – Former member of the Consultative Assembly of Saudi Arabia, married to Abdul Rahman bin Faisal bin Abdulaziz Al Saud, son of King Faisal
- Noura bint Sultan Al Saud (born 1948) – widow of Turki bin Nasser Al Saud
- Sahab bint Abdullah (born 1993) – ex-wife of Khalid bin Hamad Al Khalifa
- Sara bint Faisal Al Saud (born 1935) – Former member of the Consultative Assembly of Saudi Arabia; married to Muhammed bin Saud Al Saud
- Sara bint Talal bin Abdulaziz Al Saud (born 1973)
- Sara bint Mashour Al Saud – wife of Crown Prince Mohammed bin Salman

== Great-grandchildren ==
=== Patrilineal great-grandsons of Ibn Saud ===
- Khalid bin Abdullah Al Saud (1941–1985) – businessman
- Turki bin Faisal bin Turki I (1943–2009) - Former member of Allegiance Council.
- Mohammed bin Abdullah Al Saud (1943–2011) - Chairman of Al Faisaliah Group and Al Ahly football club.
- Abdullah bin Faisal bin Turki (1945–2019) – Member of Allegiance Council, succeeding late brother Turki bin Faisal
- Saud bin Abdullah Al Saud (1946–2020) – military official, businessman
- Faisal bin Muhammad bin Saud (born 1951) – Deputy governor of Al Bahah Region (1988–2011)
- Mishaal bin Muhammad bin Saud (born 1956) Businessman and philanthropist
- Faisal bin Mishaal bin Saud bin Abdulaziz Al Saud (born 1959) – Governor of Qassim Region
- Amr bin Mohammed Al Faisal Al Saud (born 1960) – Businessman
- Bandar bin Khalid Al Saud (born 1965) – Chairman of Al Watan
- Sultan bin Khalid bin Faisal – Naval officer
- Turki Bin Mohammed Bin Nasser Bin Abdulaziz Al Saud (born 1969) – Director of International Affairs Ministry of Industry and Electricity
- Saud bin Khalid Al Saud – Deputy Governor of Saudi Arabian General Investment Authority
- Faisal bin Turki bin Nasser (born 1973) – President of Al Nassr
- Faisal bin Khalid bin Sultan bin Abdulaziz Al Saud (born 1973) – Governor of the Northern Borders Region
- Sattam bin Khalid bin Nasser Al Saud
- Faisal bin Bandar bin Sultan Al Saud – President of the Saudi Arabian Federation for Electronic and Intellectual Sports
- Faisal bin Turki Al Faisal Al Saud (born 1975) – Director of Project Aware
- Saud bin Abdulaziz bin Nasser Al Saud (born 1977) – Convicted murderer
- Khalid bin Bandar bin Sultan Al Saud (born 1977) – Businessman, ambassador to Germany and the United Kingdom
- Nawaf bin Faisal bin Fahd (born 1978) – Former president of youth welfare and former International Olympic Committee member
- Khaled bin Alwaleed bin Talal (born 1978) – investor
- Turki bin Mohamed bin Fahd Al Saud (born 1979) – Chairman of TAALEM Educational Services Company
- Abdulaziz bin Saud bin Nayef (born 1983) – Interior Minister since June 2017.
- Mohammed bin Saud bin Nayef – Horse racer
- Abdulaziz bin Turki Al Saud (born 1983) – Athlete
- Abdullah bin Mutaib Al Saud (born 1984) – Olympic athlete
- Faisal bin Abdulrahman bin Saud – Former president of Al Nassr
- Mamdoh Bin Abdulrahman Bin Saud – Former president of Al Nassr
- Ahmed bin Fahd bin Salman bin Abdulaziz Al Saud (born 1986) – Foreign affairs worker, Deputy Governor of the Eastern Province.
- Abdulaziz Bin Turki Bin Talal Al-Saud (born 1986) – Investor
- Abdullah bin Khalid bin Sultan Al Saud (born 1988) - Ambassador to the United Nations and International Organizations in Vienna, Austria, Slovenia, and Slovakia
- Abdulaziz bin Fahd Al Saud (born 1990) – Former deputy governor of Al-Jouf region
- Muhammad bin Faisal bin Bandar – Air Force officer
- Sultan bin Fahad bin Nasser, husband of Deena Aljuhani Abdulaziz.
- Abdulaziz bin Fahd bin Turki, Deputy Governor of Jawf

=== Great-granddaughters ===
- Mishaal bint Fahd bin Mohammed Al Saud (1958–1977) – executed for alleged adultery
- Reema bint Bandar Al Saud (born 1975) – Saudi ambassador to the US
- Noura bint Faisal Al Saud (born 1988) – founder of the Saudi Fashion Week
- Lama bint Turki Al Saud – amateur jumper
- Lamia bint Majid Al Saud – philanthropist
- Noura bint Mohammed Al Saud – Jewelry designer
- Reem Al Faisal – Photographer
- Sara bint Mashour Al Saud – wife of Crown Prince Mohammed
- Sara bint Mansour Al Saud - Clinical Psychologist and Fashion Designer
- Sora bint Saud Al Saud – Entrepreneur

== Great-great-grandchildren ==
- Mohammed bin Khalid Al Saud (born 1967) – president and director of Al Faisaliah Group

== Non-patrilineal descendants of Ibn Saud ==
- Abdullah bin Mohammad, son of Muhammad bin Abdul-Rahman (Ibn Saud's half-brother) and Hussa bint Ahmed Al Sudairi (Ibn Saud's wife). This makes him the double step-son and half-nephew of Ibn Saud. He also married Noura bint Saud, the granddaughter of Ibn Saud through his son King Saud, making him a grandson-in-law of Ibn Saud. Father of the below
- Fahd bin Abdullah bin Mohammed Al Saud (born 1941) – Former Deputy Minister of Defense. Son of Noura bint Saud, daughter of King Saud.
- Fahd bin Abdullah Al Saud (born 1948) – Director of Air Operations
- Faisal bin Abdullah bin Mohammed Al Saud (born 1950) – Former Minister of Education. Son of Nouf bint Abdelaziz and Abdullah bin Mohammed Al Saud. Married to Adila bint Abdulla Al Saud, daughter of King Abdullah.
- Abdullah bin Faisal bin Turki bin Abdullah Al Saud (born 1951) – Former Ambassador to the United States. Son of Luluwah bint Abdulaziz Al Saud and Faisal bin Turki bin Abdullah bin Saud Al Saud.
- Nayef bin Sultan Al Shaalan (born 1956) – Diplomat, convicted of drug trafficking. Maternal grandson of Ibn Saud. Son-in-law of Abdul-Rahman bin Abdulaziz Al Saud
- Sultan bin Faisal bin Turki (1961–2002) – Son of Luluwah bint Abdulaziz Al Saud and Faisal bin Turki bin Abdullah bin Saud Al Saud. Killed in a car accident on way to cousin Ahmed bin Salman's funeral.
- Saud bin Khalid bin Abdullah – Deputy chairman of the board of Directors of Al-Mawarid Holding Company and Vice-chairman of the board of directors of the Orbit Satellite Television and Radio Network. Son of Al Jawhara bint Abdulaziz Al Saud and Khalid ibn Abdullah, son of Abdullah bin Abdul-Rahman, half-brother of Ibn Saud.
- Turki bin Abdullah – Former member of the National Guard and advisor to King Abdullah. Son of Seeta bint Abdulaziz Al Saud and Abdullah bin Mohammed bin Saud Al Kabir Al Saud.
- Fahd bin Abdullah – Former assistant minister of defense. Son of Seeta bint Abdulaziz Al Saud and Abdullah bin Mohammed bin Saud Al Kabir Al Saud.
