= Turki bin Abdulaziz Al Saud =

Turki bin Abdul-Aziz Al Saud may refer to:

- Turki I bin Abdulaziz Al Saud (1900–1919), eldest son of King Abdulaziz of Saudi Arabia
- Turki II bin Abdulaziz Al Saud (1934–2016), member of the House of Saud
