= Okaz =

Arabic Saudi Arabian daily newspaper

- Type: Daily newspaper
- Founder: Ahmad Abd al-Ghafur Attar
- Publisher: Okaz Organization for Press and Publication
- Editor-in-chief: Jameel Altheyabi
- Founded: 1960; 66 years ago
- Political alignment: Liberal
- Language: Arabic
- Headquarters: Jeddah
- Circulation: 250,000 (as of 2010)
- Sister newspapers: Saudi Gazette
- OCLC number: 2265453
- Website: Okaz

Okaz (Arabic: عكاظ) is an Arabic Saudi Arabian daily newspaper located in Jeddah. The paper was launched in 1960 and its sister publication is Saudi Gazette. The paper is printed in Riyadh and Jeddah and operates offices across Saudi Arabia. The daily publication serves the provinces of the Hejaz and Asir. As of 2012, Abdullah Saleh Kamel served as the chairman of the board of directors of the Okaz Organization for Press and Publication. Okaz has been referred to as "...an Arabic version" of the New York Post.

== History ==
Okaz was established in Jeddah in 1960 by Ahmed Abdul Ghafoor Attar and is one of the oldest newspapers in Saudi Arabia. John R. Bradley, in his book Saudi Arabia Exposed: Inside a Kingdom in Crisis, described it as a "downmarket newspaper ... the closest Saudi Arabia has to a yellow press."

Despite Bradley's description, Okaz was originally a cultural weekly based in the Hijaz. In October 1964, it was relaunched as a daily paper.

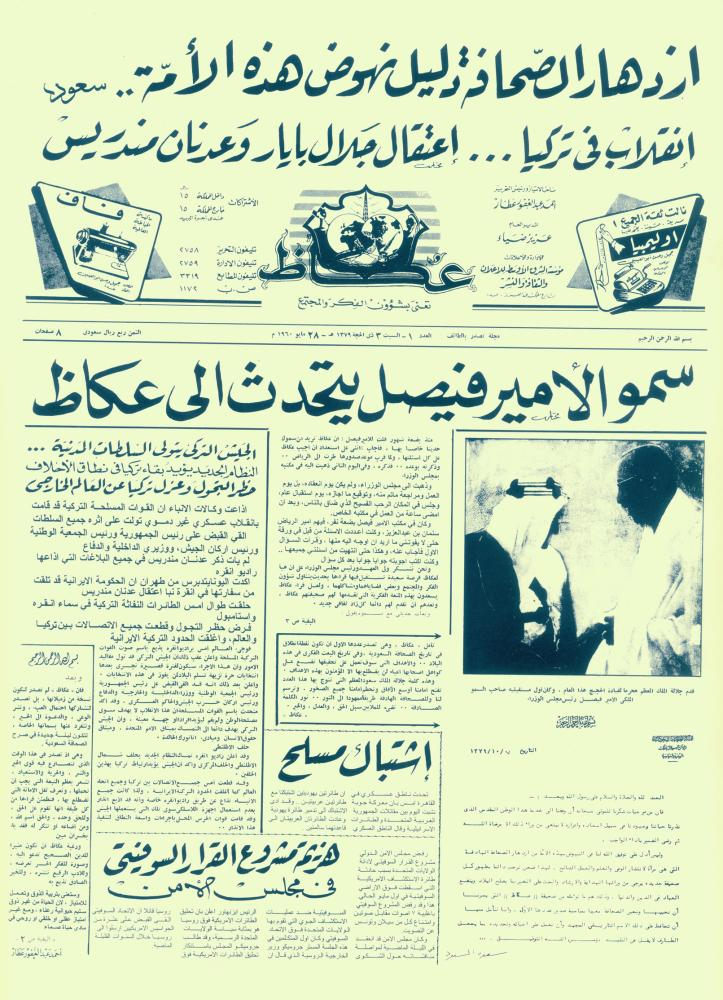
Front page of Okaz first issue, 28 May 1960.

Its name was used as Okadh in some scientific publications while referring to it. In fact, the paper is named after the popular Okaz market, which was one of the largest open markets during the pre-Islamic era in the Hijaz region in which eminent poets of the period came together to congregate poems and hold recitation competitions in Taif.

== Popularity ==
Okaz was a popular newspaper in Hijaz at the beginning of the 1990s. In the mid-1980s, the paper was often perceived as a newspaper in decline because of failure to invest. However, it invested in printing facilities and its circulation expanded. In 2009, Okaz is regarded as the most popular paper in the Hijaz and third most popular in Riyadh. Furthermore, Okaz is said to be one of only two major Saudi print media that do not have the member of the Al Saud family among its share-holders. Based on the results of a media survey conducted by research company Ipsos Stat, Okaz ranked first in readership ratings. Dubai Press Club stated that the paper is mostly preferred by Saudi nationals and younger people.

== Circulation ==
In 2002, Okaz was the largest newspaper in the country. In 2003, it had an estimated circulation of 147,000 copies. Its estimated circulation is reported to be 150,000 in 2009. Dubai Press Club in 2010 reported that Okaz is the most popular Arabic daily paper in the Kingdom with a circulation of 250,000 that was confirmed by the media research.

Global Investment House stated the market share of Okaz as around 6% in 2009. The circulation of the paper was 250,000 copies in 2010.

The online version of the paper was the 23rd most visited website for 2010 in the MENA region. It was reported by Forbes Middle East in 2011 to be one of top ten online newspapers (specifically the ninth) in the MENA region. In 2012, Okaz's online edition was ranked by Forbes Middle East as the sixth in the MENA region with 42.56 million hits, including 12.60 million unique hits.

== Political approach ==
Okaz, a paper of Hejaz, is considered to be one of the two leading liberal daily papers in Saudi Arabia. The other one is Al Watan. However, the paper was reported to be close to late Crown Prince Nayef.

== Prominent columnists ==
The newspaper has several well-respected columnists such as Juhair bint Abdallah Al Musa'id and Abdallah Al Jufri. The pioneering deputy chair of the National Society for Human Rights, Al Jawhara bint Mohammed Al Anqari also writes for Okaz. Hussein Shobokshi is among the former columnists of the paper who left it after publishing an article on accountable government.

== Content ==
The paper contains a section on environmental issues.

Hussein Shobokshi, a former columnist for Okaz, wrote about his vision of a country where the government is fully accountable to the public, citizens can freely vote, and women can drive cars in his July 2003 column. His article led to a huge public reaction, including complaints from what he called "tribal and religious groups." Then, he was quickly put in the blacklist for the next year and his new talk show on the Saudi-owned satellite broadcaster Al Arabiya was cancelled. His editor told Shobokshi that he was banned without explaining why or by whom.

Princess Fahda bint Saud, one of King Saud's daughters, published an article on Okaz on 15 November 2003. The article was titled "The Bombings: Who is Behind the Scenes? Who is Behind Terrorism?" and concerned with Zionist threats posed to Saudi Arabia.

In an editorial entitled 'The limits of our responsibility' published in Okaz on 28 November 2003, it was admitted that Saudi money had gone to finance the terrorist acts of 9/11, but added: "It was to be expected that funds have gone out of our pockets and our wealth to those who carried out the act (of 9/11) even though it was done indirectly and without our knowledge."

Two female reporters wrote about a taboo in the context of Saudi Arabia, lesbians, in 2007. They reported the confessions of two women having lesbian relationship.

Muhammad Al Tunisi, who had been serving as editor-in-chief of the paper since October 2008, allowed the publication of a report by Sami Al Harbi about high consumption of the Khat drug plant in Jazan in late November 2011. The report based on a field study claimed that 70% of residents used the Khat plant, affecting the cells of the human body and leading to sexual deviation. This report led to Jazan's residents', particularly young men's, boycott against the newspaper and call for the paper to be banned. Then, Al Tunisi was dismissed by the paper administration, although he apologized and the paper declared that the report had been a scientific study. Then, Al Tunisi was replaced by Hashim Abdo Hashim as editor-in-chief in December 2011.

According to the Okaz, the murdered Saudi journalist Jamal Khashoggi was a terrorist sympathizer whose sectarian goals were designed to destabilize the Saudi kingdom.

== See also ==
- List of newspapers in Saudi Arabia
