= Badr bin Saud Al Saud =

Saudi royal and government official (1934–2004)

Governor of Riyadh
- In office: January–February 1963
- Predecessor: Fawwaz bin Abdulaziz Al Saud
- Successor: Salman bin Abdulaziz Al Saud
- Monarch: King Saud

Commander of National Guard
- In office: 1956–1961
- Predecessor: Musaid bin Saud
- Successor: Mansour bin Saud
- Monarch: King Saud
- Born: 1934
- Died: 21 July 2004 (aged 69–70)
- Burial: Al Oud cemetery, Riyadh
- Spouse: List: Sameera Al Muhanna Buniah Al Meshaal Al Rasheed Noura bint Mohammed bin Abdulaziz Al Shuhail Nora bint Fahd Al Qahtani
- Issue: 8
Names
- Badr bin Saud bin Abdulaziz bin Abdul Rahman
- House: Al Saud
- Father: King Saud
- Mother: Haleema

Badr bin Saud Al Saud (Arabic: بدر بن سعود آل سعود Badr bin Su'ūd Āl Su'ūd; 1934 – 21 July 2004) was a son of King Saud and one of the grandsons of Saudi Arabia's founder King Abdulaziz. He was the governor of the Riyadh province for a short time and also served as the commander of the National Guard.

== Early life and education ==
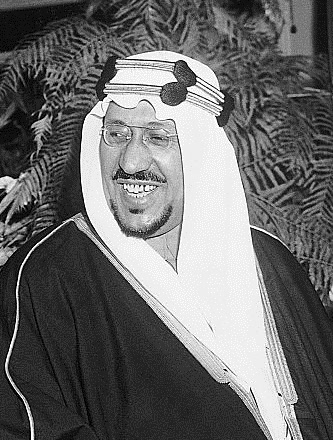
King Saud, father of Prince Badr

Badr bin Saud was born in 1934. He was educated at the palace. He finished his secondary education at the Institute of Al Anjal.

== Career ==
Prince Badr was made the commander of the National Guard in 1956, succeeding his brother Musaid. In 1961, Badr was replaced by his half-brother Mansour bin Saud in the post.

At the end of 1962, King Saud and his half-brother Crown Prince Faisal were in a feud for political power. In January 1963, King Saud fired most of the provincial governors, who may have been loyal to Crown Prince Faisal. Prince Badr replaced Prince Fawwaz bin Abdulaziz as the governor of the Riyadh region on 20 January 1963. However, he was fired by Crown Prince Faisal within a mere two weeks on 4 February. He then went into private business, never serving in government again.

=== Exile and later years ===
In 1964, King Saud was forced into exile in Geneva, Switzerland, and then on to other European cities. In 1966, Saud was invited by Gamal Abdel Nasser to live in Egypt. Another report claims that King Saud went to Egypt under refuge granted by Nasser and stayed there from 1965 to 1967. King Saud was also allowed to broadcast propaganda on Radio Cairo. Prince Badr and some of his brothers, including Princes Khalid, Sultan and Mansour, did not declare their allegiance to Faisal, the successor of King Saud. Instead, they joined their father and supported his attempt to regain the throne.

Prince Badr later returned to Saudi Arabia and in 1980 established a company in Riyadh with a Swiss firm which dealt with the soap business.

== Personal life ==
Prince Badr married four times. His spouses were Sameera Al Muhanna, Buniah Al Meshaal Al Rasheed, Noura bint Mohammed bin Abdulaziz Al Shuhail and Nora bint Fahd Al Qahtani.

He had eight sons, including Mishaal who was the acting undersecretary of the National Guard for the Eastern province in 2011.

== Death ==
Prince Badr died in 2004 at the age of 70 and was buried in Al Oud cemetery.
