= Saad bin Saud Al Saud =

Saudi royal and military officer (1924–1977)

Commander of the National Guard
- In office: 1959 – August 1963
- Predecessor: Khalid bin Saud
- Successor: Abdullah bin Abdulaziz
- Monarch: Saud
- Born: 1924
- Died: 1968 (aged 43–44)
Names
- Saad bin Saud bin Abdulaziz bin Abdul Rahman
- House: Al Saud
- Father: King Saud
- Mother: Baraka Al Raziqi Al Alma'i

Saad bin Saud Al Saud (1924–1968) was a Saudi royal and military officer who served as the commander of the Saudi Arabian National Guard (SANG) between 1959 and 1963. He was a son of the second king of Saudi Arabia, King Saud (r. 1953-1964), and the grandson of the country's founder and first ruler, King Abdulaziz (r. 1932–1953).

== Biography ==
Prince Saad bin Saud was born in 1924 as the son of Prince Saud bin Abdulaziz and Baraka Al Raziqi Al Alma'i. His father, Prince Saud, was the son of Saudi King Abdulaziz. His mother, Baraka, was from Asir in southwest Saudi Arabia. Prince Saad had a full brother, Prince Muhammed.

Prince Saad had business activities and was a promoter of the Saudi Arabian Rafinery Company based in Jeddah. In 1959, he became the commander of SANG, replacing his half-brother Prince Khalid in the post. Prince Saad's tenure ended in August 1963 when Crown Prince Faisal named Prince Abdullah bin Abdulaziz (later King Abdullah) as commander of SANG.

Saad bin Saud died in 1968.
