= Turki bin Mohammed Al Saud (born 1969) =

- Born: 1 March 1969 (age 56); Riyadh
- Father: Prince Mohammed bin Nasser bin Abdulaziz Al Saud.

Turki bin Mohammed bin Nasser bin Abdulaziz Al Saud ( Arabic:الأمير تركي بن محمد بن ناصر عبد العزيز آل سعود), (born 1969) is a member of House of Saud. Prince Turki is the eldest son of Mohammed bin Nasser bin Abdulaziz Al Saud, governor of Jizan province.

== Early life and education ==
Prince Turki was born and raised in Riyadh. His mother is Princess Al Bandari bint Khalid bin Turki Al Saud. He received his early education in Riyadh Schools.

Prince Turki holds a bachelor's degree in press & media from King Saud University, KSA, and earned his master's degree in business administration from Santa Clara University, California.

== Professional career ==
Prince Turki started his career as a director of international affairs in the Ministry of Industry and Electricity which was reconstituted in 2000 into the Ministry of Commerce and Industry (MCI). Since 2002, has served as MCI's Head of International Affairs.

== Personal life ==
Prince Turki married Princess Kholoud bint Khalid Al Saud, with whom he has four children: two sons and two daughters.
