= Bandar bin Saud Al Saud =

Saudi royal and government official (1926–2016)

- Born: 2 January 1926; Riyadh
- Died: 17 March 2016 (aged 90); Madrid, Spain
- Burial: 18 March 2016; Al Oud cemetery, Riyadh
- Issue: Prince Faisal; Princess Noura; Princess Jawzaa
- Bandar bin Saud bin Abdulaziz
- House: Al Saud
- Father: King Saud
- Mother: Nayla

Bandar bin Saud Al Saud (Arabic: بندر بن سعود بن عبد العزيز آل سعود Bandar ibn Su'ūd ibn 'Abd al 'Azīz Āl Su'ūd; 2 January 1926 – 17 March 2016) was the eighth son of King Saud and one of the grandsons of Saudi Arabia's founder King Abdulaziz. He was born on the same day as when King Abdulaziz entered and joined the city and province of Qunfudah to his realm.

== Early life and education ==
Born in Riyadh on 2 January 1926, Bandar was the son of King Saud and Nayla. He studied at the school for princes and at other schools in Riyadh, and finished his complementary studies in 1944 before he graduated from high school in 1948. He then went to university in Turkey, graduating in 1952.

== Career ==
Prince Bandar returned in early 1952 to Saudi Arabia when his father was crown prince. He was assigned to the interior ministry. A few years later, in 1956, then Crown Prince Faisal bin Abdulaziz Al Saud appointed him as an adviser to the royal court, a position he held until his retirement in 1981.

== Personal life ==
Prince Bandar had three children: Prince Faisal, Princess Noura, and Princess Jawzaa.

== Death ==
Prince Bandar bin Saud died in Madrid on 17 March 2016 at age 90.
