= Mishari bin Saud Al Saud =

Saudi royal, former military officer and government official (born 1954)

Governor of Al Bahah Province
- Tenure: 28 August 2010 – April 2017
- Predecessor: Muhammed bin Saud
- Successor: Hussam bin Saud
- Monarch: Abdullah; Salman
- Born: December 1954 (age 71); Riyadh
- Issue: Princess Hala
Names
- Mishari bin Saud bin Abdulaziz
- House: Al Saud
- Father: King Saud
- Mother: Naima bint Ubaid
- Occupation: Military officer; businessman; government official
- Alma mater: King Saud University

Mishari bin Saud Al Saud (Arabic: مشاري بن سعود آل سعود; born December 1954) is a Saudi Arabian retired military officer, businessman, and retired politician. A member of the House of Saud, he is one of the children of King Saud and one of the grandsons of King Abdulaziz. Prince Mishari served as the governor of Al Bahah Province from 2010 to 2017.

== Early life and education ==
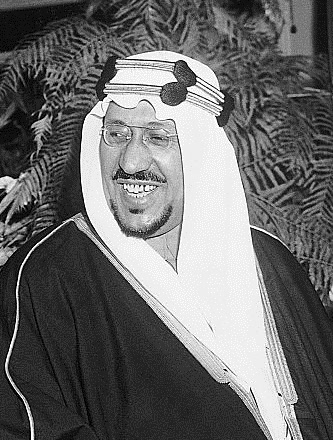
King Saud, the father of Mishari bin Saud

Mishari bin Saud was born in Riyadh in December 1954. He is one of the children of King Saud, and his mother is Naima bint Ubaid.

After completing his primary and secondary education in Saudi Arabia in 1971, he went to the US for university education. However, he only completed an eight-month English course there. He returned to Saudi Arabia to receive university education. He has a Bachelor of Arts degree in history and later, he received a master's degree in history from King Saud University. The title of his MA thesis was “Relations between Saudi Arabia and Al-Mutawakkaliya Kingdom of Yemen under the reign of King Abdulaziz.”

== Career ==
Prince Mishari was a brigade commander in the Saudi Arabian National Guard (SANG). In June 1983, he was appointed deputy commander of the SANG in the Eastern Province. He headed the SANG in the province and was the second rank royal there after the governor of the province, Prince Mohammed bin Fahd. As of 2004, he served as the assistant undersecretary of the SANG for the Eastern sector. His tenure lasted until his appointment as the governor of Al Bahah Province in 2010.

On 28 August 2010, he was appointed governor of Al Bahah Province, replacing his elder half-brother Muhammed bin Saud who resigned from this post due to health problems. His tenure ended in April 2017 when his half-brother Hussam bin Saud was made the governor of the province.

It was speculated that Prince Mishari had support of King Abdullah and was very close to Crown Prince Sultan during his term at SANG.

Prince Mishari has a stake in Imdadat Trading and Transport firm in Riyadh that he and his son, Turki, established in 1982.

== Personal life ==
His daughter, Princess Hala, is a businesswoman who created a global brand, Munch Bakery. In 2012, she married Abdulmalek bin Abdulmuhsen Al Shiekh, a member of the Al ash-Sheikh family, in Riyadh.
