= Turki I bin Abdulaziz Al Saud =

Eldest son and heir of King Abdulaziz (1901–1919)

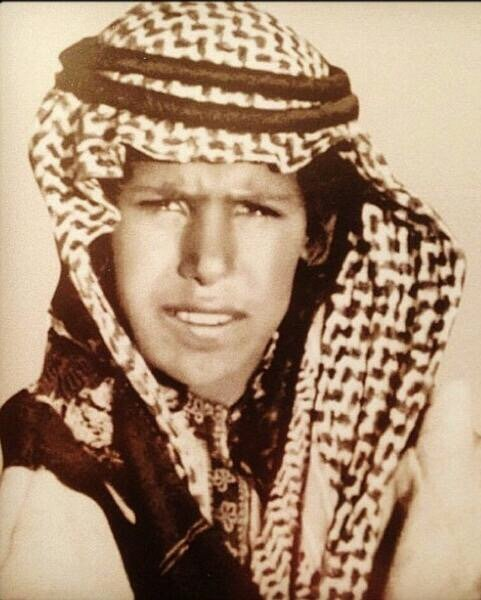
- Prince Turki in 1911

Crown Prince of Nejd
- In office: 13 January 1902–1919
- Predecessor: Post established
- Successor: Saud bin Abdulaziz
- Monarch: Abdulaziz bin Abdul Rahman
- Born: c. 1896–1901; Kuwait City, Sheikhdom of Kuwait
- Died: 1919; Riyadh, Emirate of Nejd and Hasa
- Spouse: Nuwair bint Obaid Al Rasheed; Muneera bint Obaid Al Rasheed; Fatimah bint Abdul Rahman Al Dakhil; Tarfa Al Muhanna
- Issue: Prince Faisal; Princess Hessa
Names
- Turki I bin Abdulaziz bin Abdul Rahman
- House: Al Saud
- Father: Abdulaziz, Emir of Nejd (later King of Saudi Arabia)
- Mother: Wadha bint Muhammad Al Orair

Turki I bin Abdulaziz Al Saud (Arabic: تركي الأول بن عبد العزيز آل سعود Turkī al ʾAwwal bin ʿAbdulʿazīz Āl Suʿūd; c. 1900–1919) was the eldest son of the Emir of Nejd (later King Abdulaziz of Saudi Arabia) and his second wife, Wadha bint Muhammad Al Orair. He was his father's heir apparent from 1902 to 1919. Turki accompanied his father during the conquest of the Arabian Peninsula at a young age and witnessed battles in Kuwait and Al Hasa. He died from the Spanish flu pandemic, which also killed many others in the region. His younger brother Saud replaced him as heir apparent.

== Early life ==
Turki was the eldest son of Abdulaziz bin Abdul Rahman. His mother was Wadha bint Muhammad Al Orair, Abdulaziz's second wife. She was the daughter of the chief of the Bani Khalid tribe, who ruled Al Hasa. Abdulaziz and Wadha married in 1895. Turki was born in Kuwait City when his family was in exile there.

Turki was the full-brother of the future King Saud. His full sisters included Munira and Noura.

== Activities and succession ==
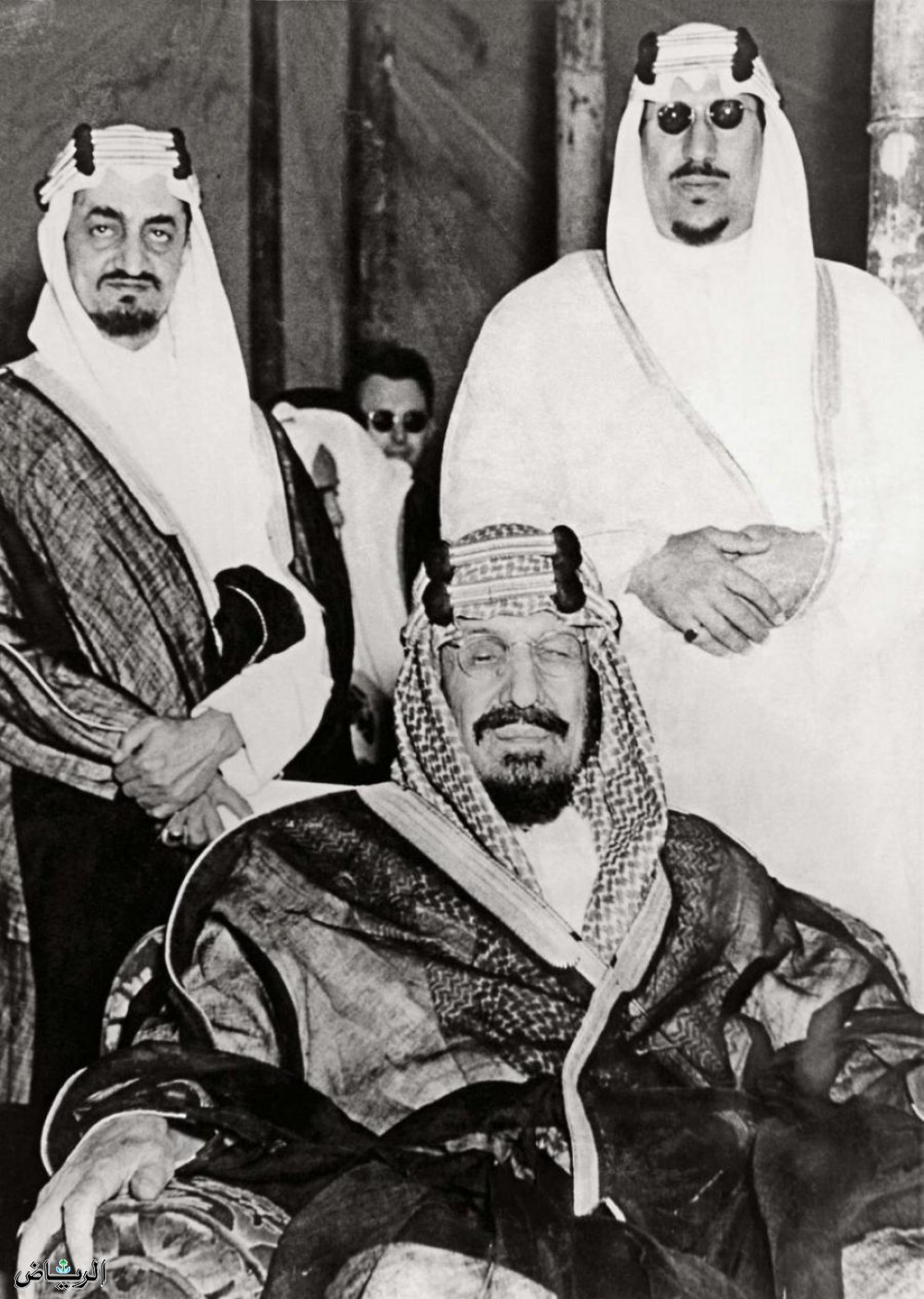
Prince Turki's father, King Abdulaziz (seated), and younger brothers King Faisal (left) and King Saud. Following Turki's death, Saud became the heir to their father.

Turki was crown prince beginning by his father's conquest of Riyadh on 15 January 1902 up to his death in 1919. He was the deputy of his father as commander-in-chief of the army until his death. He commanded an army of 4000 warriors based in Qassim region. He fought against Al Rashid forces and attempted to eliminate the leakage of supplies from the tribes to them. In 1918, on the orders of his father, Turki initiated an attack against Al Rashid forces, known as the battle of Yatab, in which the Al Saud forces gained a victory. When the British government invited Abdulaziz to visit London, he assigned Turki as his envoy. However, Turki died in 1919, and Abdulaziz named another of his sons, Faisal, as envoy.

== Personal life ==
Turki's first wife Noweir bint Obaid Al Rasheed gave birth to his son Faisal bin Turki in 1918, a few years before Turki's death. After the death of Turki, Princess Noweir married Turki's brother Saud, and they had a daughter, Al Anoud bint Saud. Turki also had a daughter with his other wife Tarfa Al Muhanna, Hessa bint Turki, who was the wife of Abdulaziz bin Faisal bin Abdulaziz. Princess Hessa and Prince Abdulaziz had two sons, Faisal and Turki. Princess Hessa died in Riyadh at the age of 91 on 19 August 2007 and was buried in Al Oud cemetery.

Two grandsons of Turki, the children of his son Faisal, served on the Allegiance Council: Turki bin Faisal, (until his death on 28 February 2009) and Abdullah bin Faisal (until his death in February 2019).

== Death ==
Prince Turki died in Riyadh in late 1919 during the flu pandemic that killed many others in the region. American doctors went to Riyadh to treat him upon the request of his father, but their attempts did not save Turki. Abdulaziz was said to be deeply saddened by his death.
