= Fahda bint Saud Al Saud =

Saudi royal and artist (born 1953)

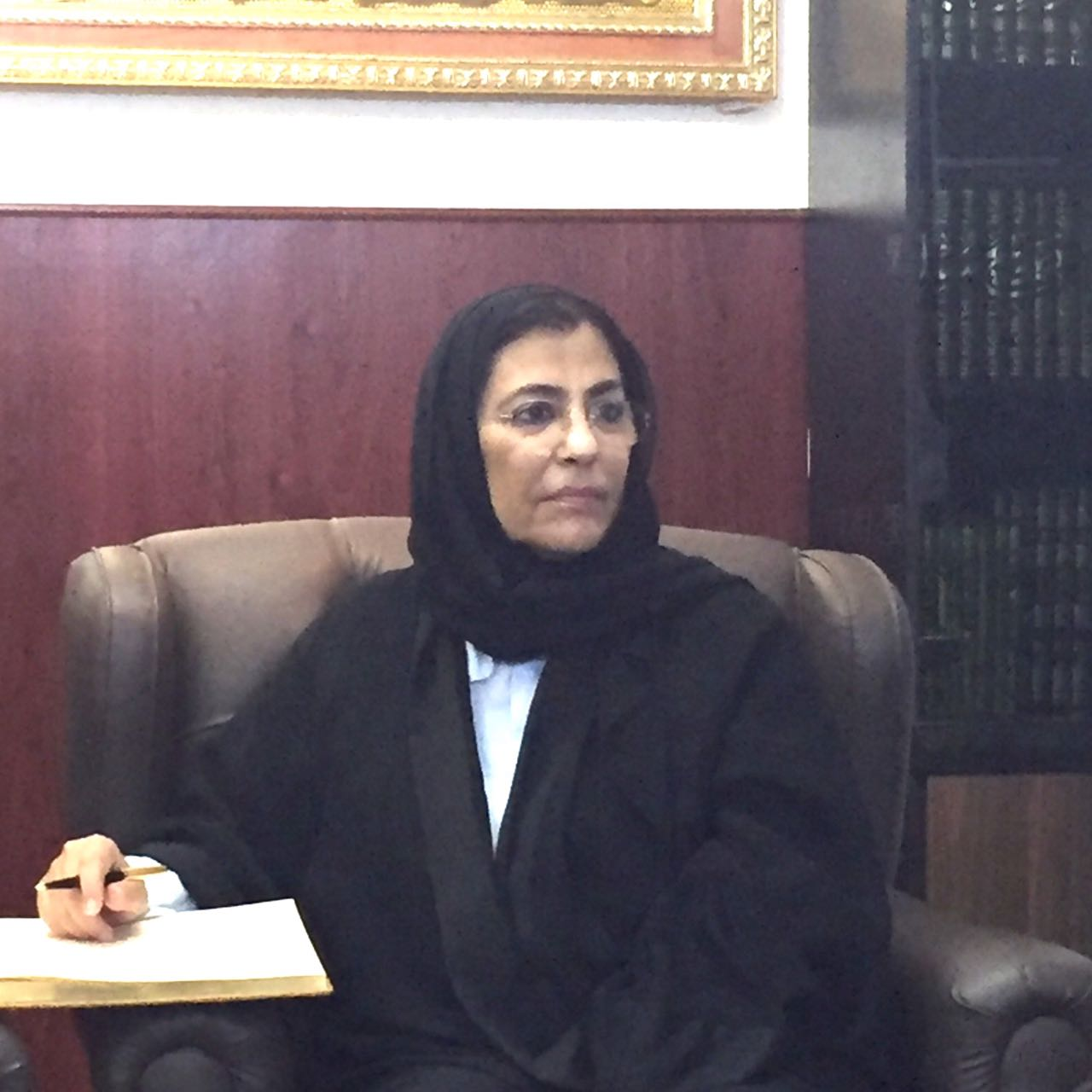
- Princess Fahda during a visit to an orphanage
- Born: 1953 (age 72–73); Riyadh, Saudi Arabia
- Spouse: Baron Abdullah Kurt Bergstrøm
- Issue: Abdulaziz Abdullah Bergstøm
Names
- Fahda bint Saud bin Abdulaziz
- House: Al Saud
- Father: Saud of Saudi Arabia
- Mother: Jamila bint Assad bin Ibrahim Al Mirhi
- Education: Lebanese American University; American University of Beirut

Fahda bint Saud Al Saud (Arabic: فهدة بنت سعود آل سعود Fahada bint Su'ūd Āl Su'ūd; born 1953) is a Saudi royal and artist. She is one of the grandchildren of Saudi Arabia's founder King Abdulaziz and one of the children of King Saud.

== Early life and education ==
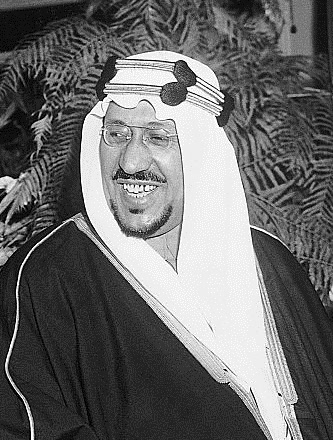
King Saud, father of Princess Fahda

Fahda was born in 1953 to King Saud and one of his wives Jamila bint Assad bin Ibrahim Al Mirhi from Latakia, Syria. Fahda received primary educational at the Karimat High School in Riyadh until 1964. Then in 1969, she graduated from the Beirut Evangelical School for girls (BESG) in Beirut. She received her bachelor's degree in political science from Beirut College for Women (now the Lebanese American University) in 1974. She then obtained a master's degree in political sciences from the American University of Beirut in 1976. She then studied at the School of Oriental and African Studies for one year. There she participated in a non-degree research courses in the department of political science. Later, she moved to Paris to study art and was trained by late Iraqi artist Issam Al Said on Islamic geometric patterns.

== Activities ==
Princess Fahda is the founder as well as the head of publishing and archiving at the King Saud Library which collects, archives, and publishes the history and legacy of King Saud.

Princess Fahda also sits as the president of Al Faisaliyya Women's Welfare Society in Jeddah which she has chaired for over two decades, as well as head of Sleysla, a Cooperative Society, specialized in modernizing Saudi handy crafts and fashion in Jeddah using locally sourced raw materials with locally inspired traditional designs and employing local women to produce them.

Princess Fahda participated in some exhibitions that have feminist focus through her watercolours. One of such exhibitions was organized by the Royal Society of Fine Arts in Jordan and the Pan-Mediterranean Women Artists Network of Greece to eliminate the negative stereotypes concerning women across the Islamic world. The first exhibition was in Australia under the organization of the Interfaith Centre of Melbourne from 25 January to 23 March 2008. Princess Fahda's watercolour work in this exhibition entitled Three Women is a visual representation of the Japanese Golden Rule "See no evil, hear no evil, speak no evil" so dominant in the Islamic world. She herself also organized exhibitions mainly concerning with her father's memory. Additionally, Princess Fahda supported the exhibitions of other artists in Saudi Arabia, for instance that of Farha Sayeed, an Indian artist who focuses on decoration of eggs.

Princess Fahda painted the pictures of the book dedicated to her father published by King Saud foundation that was seen as part of the rehabilitation of King Saud. She is president of the Al Faisaliyah women's welfare society, that is a Jeddah-based organization mainly targeting women.

== Views ==
Princess Fahda wrote several articles on different topics in leading Saudi newspapers such as Okaz and Arab News, relating to social issues and Saudi history.

In February 2007, Fahda's article entitled "Saudi women's concerns" was published in Al Hayat. There Princess Fahda clearly expressed that debate continuing about the rights of women in Saudi society has been "pivotal to the nation's renaissance." However, she is described as a traditionalist, but not a reactionary. She supports reform towards women, but largely depending on the country's own values, including religious values.

An interview with Fahda was among those included in Mona Almunajjed's book entitled Saudi Women Speak: 24 Remarkable Women Tell Their Success Stories, published in 2011 by the Arab Institute for Research and Publishing in Amman and Beirut.

== Personal life ==
Fahda bint Saud has one child, a son named Abdulaziz. She divorced from his father, Baron Abdullah Kurt Bergstrøm, a Danish national who changed his first name to Abdullah when converting to Islam. Abdullah Bergstrøm died in 2000.
