= Fahd bin Saud Al Saud =

Saudi royal, government official, diplomat, and businessman (1923–2006)

Minister of Defense
- Reign: 1956 – 1960
- Predecessor: Mishaal bin Abdulaziz
- Successor: Muhammed bin Saud
- Monarch: Saud
- Prime Minister: Faisal bin Abdulaziz
- Born: 1923; Riyadh
- Died: 30 October 2006 (aged 82–83)
- Burial: Al Adl cemetery, Mecca
- Spouse: Al Anoud bint Faisal Al Saud
- Issue: Princess Amal
Names
- Fahd bin Saud bin Abdulaziz
- House: Al Saud
- Father: Saud of Saudi Arabia
- Mother: Munira bint Saad Al Saud

Fahd bin Saud Al Saud (Arabic: فهد بن سعود آل سعود Fahd bin Su'ūd Āl Su'ūd; 1923 – 30 October 2006) was a Saudi Arabian businessman, a government official, and the eldest son of King Saud and one of the grandsons of Saudi Arabia's founder King Abdulaziz. He served as the Saudi Arabian minister of defense from 1956 to 1960 during the reign of his father.

== Early life ==
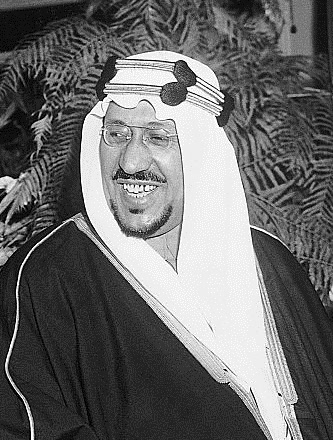
King Saud, father of Prince Fahd

Prince Fahd was born in 1923 as the first son of the future King Saud. His mother was Munirah bint Saad bin Saud Al Saud, granddaughter of Saud bin Faisal bin Turki, who was the brother of Abdul Rahman bin Faisal, grandfather of King Saud. Thus, Prince Fahd's parents were second cousins.

== Career ==
During the reign of his father, Prince Fahd was first made the head of the royal court which he held between 1953 and 1956. Next, he was appointed the minister of defense and inspector general in 1956, replacing Mishaal bin Abdulaziz Al Saud in the post. He left the office, but reassumed the post on 26 September 1958 and remained in office until 1960. He was the Saudi ambassador to Greece from 1964 to 1968.

After retiring from government, Prince Fahd was involved in business.

== Personal life ==
Prince Fahd had two wives. One of his spouses was Princess Al Anoud, a daughter of King Faisal. King Abdulaziz arranged their marriage to reduce the tension between their fathers. They married in May 1943, but separated after years of marriage. His second wife was of Syrian origin. He had one daughter: Amal bint Fahd.

== Death and burial ==
On 30 October 2006, Prince Fahd died at his house and was buried at Al Adl cemetery in Mecca.
