= Hussam bin Saud Al Saud =

Saudi royal, businessman, and politician (born 1960)

Governor of Al Bahah Province
- Tenure: 22 April 2017 – present
- Appointed by: King Salman
- Predecessor: Mishari bin Saud
- Born: 23 May 1960 (age 66); Jeddah, Saudi Arabia
- Spouse: Sarah bint Musaed bin Abdulaziz
- Issue: 5 (incl. Saud)
Names
- Hussam bin Saud bin Abdulaziz
- House: Al Saud
- Father: King Saud
- Mother: Noura bint Abdullah Al Damer

Hussam bin Saud Al Saud (Arabic: حسام بن سعود آل سعود Ḥussam ibn Su'ūd Āl Su'ūd; born 23 May 1960) is a Saudi Arabian politician and businessman who is the governor of Al Bahah Province since 2017. He is the son of King Saud who ruled from 1953 to 1964 and one of the grandsons of Saudi's founder King Abdulaziz.

== Early life and education ==
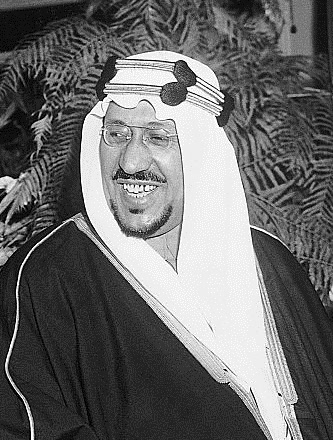
King Saud, father of Prince Hussam

Prince Hussam was born on 23 May 1960. He is the fifty-second son of King Saud, and his mother is Noura bint Abdullah Al Damer.

Prince Hussam has a degree in economics from King Saud University and master's degree in economics from London School of Economics. He also holds a PhD in economic theories of unemployment and its impact on government policies from Birkbeck College of University of London which he received in 1989.

== Career ==
Prince Hussam is a businessman and has many business activities like Arabian Plastic Compound and NAHL Water Factory in Egypt and Lebanon. He is also the chairman of Saudi-Kuwait Holding, set up to provide investment in both countries. He is the former chairman of Zain Saudi Arabia.

In April 2017, he was named governor of Al Baha province.

== Personal life ==
Prince Hussam is married to Princess Sara bint Musaed bin Abdulaziz, and they have five children. In 2010, one of his sons, Prince Saud bin Hussam, married a daughter of Prince Khalid bin Musaed bin Abdul Rahman in Riyadh.

He has been involved in a long running legal dispute with Mobile Telecommunications Company KSCP. In 2012 Mobile Communications benefitted from an Arbitration award against the Prince for a sum in excess of $500 million, which is said to exceed $1 billion in 2025 when interest and costs are added. The Prince has not paid the award. In 2018 a Court in London sentenced him, in his absence, to 12 months imprisonment for contempt of Court although a more recent attempt by his creditor to bankrupt him in the UK has failed.
