= Mashour bin Saud Al Saud =

Saudi royal (1954–2004)

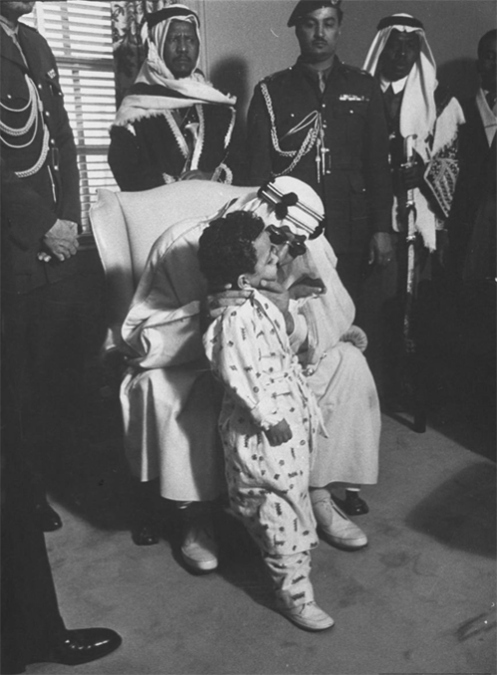
- Mashour with his father King Saud
- Born: 1954; Riyadh
- Died: 21 November 2004 (aged 49–50)
- Spouse: Fatima Kurdi
- Issue: List: Bandar Bayan Dalal Al Bandari
Names
- Mashour bin Saud bin Abdulaziz
- House: Al Saud
- Father: King Saud
- Mother: Terkiyah Mohammed Al Abdulaziz

Mashour bin Saud Al Saud (Arabic: مشهور بن سعود آل سعود; 1954 – 21 November 2004) was a member of House of Saud, one of the children of King Saud who ruled Saudi Arabia between 1953 and 1964, and one of the grandsons of Saudi Arabia's founder King Abdulaziz.

== Early life ==
Prince Mashour was born in Riyadh in 1954. He was a son of King Saud and Terkiyah Mohammed Al Abdulaziz.

He began his education at King Abdulaziz school in Riyadh. He left the Kingdom with his cousin, Prince Khalid bin Faisal Al Saud, for the United States and studied at the Institute of George Washington.

== Visit to the United States, 1957 ==
In 1957, King Saud made an official visit to Washington, D.C. carrying his three-year-old son, Prince Mashour, who was suffering an illness. U.S President Dwight D. Eisenhower tasked his personal physician to look after him at Walter Reed Hospital.

== Activities ==
In 1985, Prince Mashour was charged with conspiring to smuggle cocaine into Britain and spent two weeks in jail before he was granted 150,000 pound sterling bail at the high court in London. Bail was refused after the prosecution told the court that Mashour had no diplomatic immunity and was ordered to report twice a week to police until his trial. In April 1986, Prince Mashour was found guilty after admitting possession of cocaine and told the court he spent about 500,000 dollars a year on cocaine and on a high standard of living.

== Personal life and death ==
Prince Mashour was married to Princess Fatima Kurdi and they had three children: a son, Prince Bandar, and two daughters Princesses Bayan and Al Bandari.

Prince Mashour died on 21 November 2004.
