= Basmah bint Saud Al Saud =

Saudi royal, businesswoman, and activist (born 1964)

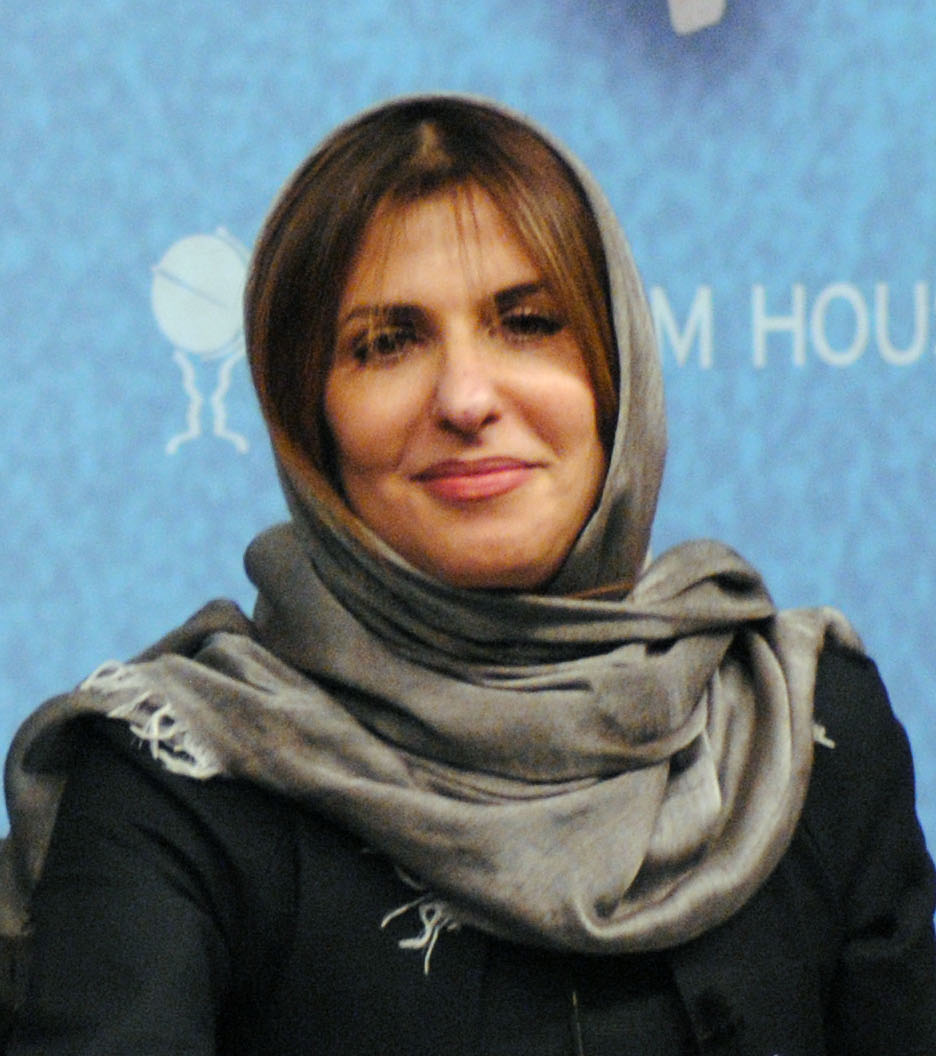
- Basmah bint Saud at Chatham House in 2013
- Born: 1 March 1964 (age 62); Riyadh, Saudi Arabia
- Spouse: Shuja bin Nami bin Shahin Al Sharif (m. 1988; div. 2007)
- Issue: Saud; Sara; Samahir; Suhoud; Ahmad
Names
- Basmah bint Saud bin Abdulaziz
- House: Al Saud
- Father: King Saud
- Mother: Jamila Merhi

Basmah bint Saud bin Al Saud (Arabic: بسمة بنت سعود آل سعود Bismah bint Su'ūd Āl Su'ūd; born 1 March 1964) is a Saudi Arabian royal, businesswoman and human rights activist. She is one of the grandchildren of Saudi's founder King Abdulaziz and a daughter of King Saud.

Princess Basmah is the youngest daughter of King Saud. Her mother, Jamila bint Asad Ibrahim Marei, immigrated to Saudi Arabia from the Syrian port city of Latakia. King Saud married her and had seven children with her. Part of Basmah's childhood was spent in Beirut, Lebanon. As a result of the Lebanese Civil War, she and her mother moved between England and the United States.

In March 2019, Basmah bint Saud was arrested by eight armed men when she and her daughter Suhoud Al Sharif tried to leave Saudi Arabia for medical attention in Switzerland. Basmah then went missing from public view. It was reported that she was held in the al-Ha'ir Prison. On 6 January 2022, Basmah and Suhoud were released.

== Early life ==
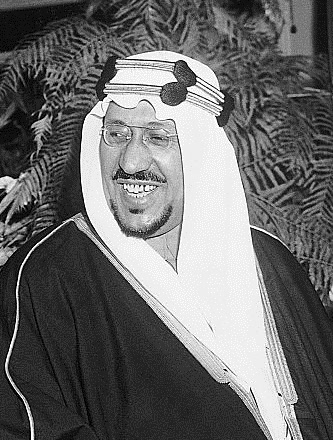
King Saud, Basmah's father

Born on 1 March 1964 in Riyadh, Saudi Arabia, Basmah is the 119th and youngest of King Saud's children. Her mother was a Syrian-born woman, Jamila Merhi, who was chosen for her future husband when she visited Mecca on the hajj.

Basmah was born during the final months of her father's reign, the same month he was overthrown as a real ruler in a palace coup. She saw him only twice when she was five, the year of his death. Her mother took her to the Middle East's then-most cosmopolitan city, the Lebanese capital of Beirut. When Lebanon's civil war broke out in 1975, the family fled for Britain.

== Education ==
In Beirut, Basmah bint Saud attended a French school. In Britain, she attended a Hertfordshire girls' school and a College in London, before spending two years studying in Switzerland. Basmah studied medicine, psychology and English literature at Beirut Arab University. In 1979, she graduated from high school at the Leaders College in the US.

Basmah travelled between several European capital cities and the US, where she studied at various universities, before moving with her mother to Syria in 1983. These universities included Richmond in the UK and the American University in Lausanne, Switzerland, where she studied the social sciences. In 1984, she received BSc (Hons) Degree in Sociology from the National American University, then in 1986, went on to achieve MSc Degree in Social Economics and Political Science.

== Personal life ==
In 1988, Princess Basmah was married to Shuja bin Nami bin Shahin Al Sharif, a member of the Al Sharif family. They divorced in 2007. She is mother of five children, three daughters and two sons.

=== Detention ===
Princess Basmah was arrested in March 2019 over the accusation of trying to travel outside the kingdom illegally, which is a criminal offense in Saudi Arabia. Her daughter Souhoud bint Shuja Al-Sharif, who is being held with her in Al-Ha'ir Prison, was accused of assaulting an agent and an unspecified cyber-crime. During their arrest in 2019, no formal charges were brought forward against either of them. Since the princess’ arrest, she hasn’t been allowed to have a regular contact with her family nor has she been provided with any legal advice.

Basmah has been suffering from osteoporosis, colonic and heart issues, but she hasn’t received regular or proper medical care since her detention. Her family believes her arrest was linked to her claim of being a part of a multi-billion-euro inheritance left by her father, King Saud. She was released on 6 January 2022.

== Business ==
After Basmah bint Saud divorced her Saudi husband, she founded a chain of restaurants in Saudi Arabia and she is planning to expand these into Britain. In 2008, she also founded a media firm, Media Ecco, in addition to catering firms, which she is also planning to expand.

=== Views ===
Basmah bint Saud is a mild advocate of reform. She has been an active participant of different social institutions and human rights organizations. She began to express her views on Arab and international media, writing articles on the hard life conditions of Saudis, particularly of women. However, her criticisms do not directly address the royal family but the Saudi governors and other middle-level administrators. Writing for Al Madina newspaper in April 2010, Basmah bint Saud told that she could not find any Qur'anic or Islamic historical basis for a state institution to promote virtue and prevent vice, and she further argued that the arrests and beatings by religious policemen lead to an incorrect impression about Islam. She specifically supports reform in Saudi Islamic laws regarding bans on mixed gatherings of men and women, and to make optional for Muslim women to cover modestly or not.

Her journalism and blogging has drawn criticism, and she told The Independent that Saudi officials had begun censoring her articles. On the other hand, she insisted that her move from Jeddah to Acton was not due to pressure from the Saudi state. Basmah bint Saud has questioned the misuse of the Islamic fiqh in Saudi society, arguing that the religious establishment needs to be reformed in order that it plays a constructive role in modernising society and improving the situation of women in the kingdom.

In April 2012, Basmah told BBC that there are many changes she would like to see in Saudi Arabia but that is not the time for women to be allowed to drive, a right Saudi women were given as part of the reforms by King Salman and Crown Prince Mohammed bin Salman. Basmah called for changes concerning constitution, divorce laws, overhaul of the educational system, complete reform of social services and changes in the role of the mahram (the male guardian, usually a relative, that all Saudi women are required to have). Upon the paralysing of a Saudi national as a punishment by the Kingdom, Princess Basmah criticised it, stating that it cannot be acceptable on humanitarian grounds.

== The Fourth Way Law ==
Through the research centre, GURA, based in London, the Fourth Way Law was registered and documented by the European Union in 2014. Princess Basmah received a prize in recognition for internationally monitoring human rights, geopolitical changes, international developments, establishing training centres in various fields related to the culture of the Fourth Way Law on a global scale, such as security, economic and administrative. It has been noted that many countries, such as America and Britain, have been taking recommendations from the Fourth Way Law when making decisions on intellectual, environmental and economic security which other specialist international research centers had not discussed.

One of these recommendations was the decision of the American President Obama in 2014 to implement a law to monitor social network sites and develop specialised laws for it. Many sections from the Fourth Way Law specialising in human rights have also been adopted in Britain after she gave a famous lecture at the University of Cambridge in 2012. In July 2015, the British government took up all the recommendations offered by Princess Basmah in the Fourth Way Law during her residence in Britain (2011–2014).
