= Muhammed bin Saud Al Saud =

Saudi royal and politician (1934–2012)

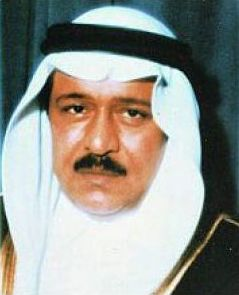

Governor of Al Bahah Province
- Reign: 1987 – 2010
- Successor: Mishari bin Saud
- Monarch: Fahd; Abdullah

Minister of Defense
- Reign: December 1960 – 31 October 1962
- Predecessor: Fahd bin Saud
- Successor: Sultan bin Abdulaziz
- Monarch: Saud
- Born: 21 March 1934; Riyadh
- Died: 8 July 2012 (aged 78); Riyadh
- Burial: 10 July 2012; Al Oud cemetery, Riyadh
- Spouse: Sara bint Faisal Al Saud
- Issue: List: Faisal Khalid Mishaal Noura
Names
- Muhammed bin Saud bin Abdulaziz
- House: Al Saud
- Father: Saud of Saudi Arabia
- Mother: Baraka Al Raziqi Al Alma'i

Muhammed bin Saud Al Saud (Arabic: محمد بن سعود آل سعود, romanized: Muḥammed bin Suʿūd Āl Suʿūd; 21 March 1934 – 8 July 2012) was a Saudi royal and politician. He was a son of King Saud and one of the grandsons of Saudi Arabia's founder King Abdulaziz. He served as the Saudi Arabian minister of defense from 1960 to 1962, during his father's reign. Later, Prince Muhammed was the governor of Al Bahah Province from 1987 to 2010.

== Early life ==
Prince Muhammed was born in Riyadh on 21 March 1934. He was the son of King Saud and Baraka Al Raziqi Al Alma'i, a woman from Asir in southwest Saudi Arabia. Prince Muhammed had a full brother, Saad bin Saud.

== Career ==
During the reign of his father, King Saud, Prince Muhammed held many governmental positions. He began his service as the chief of the Royal Court. Then he was appointed to the Saudi Royal Guard Regiment in 1953. Later, he was appointed as the minister of national defense and aviation and inspector general in December 1960, succeeding his brother Fahd bin Saud in the post. Prince Muhammed was named the minister of finance on 11 September 1961 when King Saud fired Talal bin Abdulaziz from the post. However, he held the post for only six days. His term as finance minister was extended on 15 March 1962. His tenure ended on 31 October 1962.

Prince Muhammed served as the deputy governor of the Al Bahah province until 1987. Next, he served as the governor of this province from September 1987 to 2010. He resigned from the post due to health-problems. His half-brother Mishari bin Saud replaced him in the post.

=== Political rehabilitation ===
Prince Muhammed was among King Saud's most important supporters during the latter's reign. Following a power struggle between King Saud and Crown Prince Faisal, the latter became the king on 25 November 1964, and Prince Muhammed pledged his allegiance to King Faisal. He was the first of King Saud's sons to do so, reportedly because he was married to King Faisal's daughter, Princess Sara. Following his rehabilitation, Prince Muhammed held several important positions until 2010.

== Other positions ==
Prince Muhammed was a member of the Allegiance Council from 2007 to his death on 8 July 2012. He was also a member of King Saud Foundation based in Jeddah. Prince Muhammed had various business activities, too.

== Personal life and education ==
One of Prince Muhammed's spouses was Princess Sara bint Faisal, the daughter of King Faisal. They had no children. Prince Muhammed had four children with his other wives: Prince Faisal (born 11 September 1951), Prince Khalid, Prince Mishaal (born 24 August 1956) and Princess Noura.

Prince Faisal bin Muhammed received a PhD degree.

He was appointed the deputy governor of Al Bahah province on 31 October 1988.

== Death and funeral ==
On 8 July 2012, the Saudi Royal Court announced that Prince Muhammed had died in Riyadh. He was 78. Prince Salman bin Abdulaziz (later King of Saudi Arabia) performed funeral prayer for him after Maghrib (sunset) prayer on 10 July 2012 at Imam Turki bin Abdullah Mosque in Riyadh. Sheikh Abdullah bin Abdulaziz Al Sheikh led the funeral prayer as Imam.
