= Mansour bin Saud Al Saud =

Saudi royal, businessman, and military officer (born 1946)

Commander of National Guard
- In office: 1961–1963
- Predecessor: Badr bin Saud
- Successor: Sultan bin Saud
- Monarch: King Saud
- Born: 1946 (age 79–80); Riyadh
- Issue: 7
Names
- Mansour bin Saud bin Abdulaziz
- House: Al Saud
- Father: King Saud
- Mother: Terkiyah Mohammed Al Abdulaziz

Mansour bin Saud Al Saud (Arabic: منصور بن سعود آل سعود; born 1946) is a Saudi Arabian businessman and former military officer. He is a member of the House of Saud, grandson of King Abdulaziz, and son of King Saud.

== Early life and education ==
Prince Mansour was born in 1946 in Riyadh. He is the fifteenth child of King Saud, and his mother is Terkiyah Mohammed Al Abdulaziz. Prince Mansour is a high school graduate. His full siblings include Princess Dalal, Prince Abdullah, Prince Turki and Prince Al Waleed.

== Career ==
During the reign of King Saud, Prince Mansour was the commander of the Saudi National Guard between 1961 and 1963. He replaced his brother Prince Badr in the post. Another of his brothers, Prince Sultan, succeeded Prince Mansour as the commander of the National Guard.

Prince Mansour's next post was as chief of the royal court from 1963 to 1964. He supported King Saud in his struggle against Mansour's uncle, Crown Prince Faisal. After his father abdicated and Faisal became king, Prince Mansour did not pledge allegiance to the new king, unlike some of his brothers. He accompanied his father in exile and also, in his visits to Cairo and Yemen during this period.

In the mid-1970s Prince Mansour founded construction and cement companies in Riyadh.

== Personal life ==
Prince Mansour is married and has seven children, four daughters and three sons. One of his daughters, Dima bint Mansour, opened a fashion concept store, Personage, in Saudi Arabia in 2018.

Prince Mansour lives in Paris, France. He is an honorary member of Al Nassr FC.
