= Allegiance Council =

Institution of succession to the Saudi throne

The Allegiance Council (Arabic: هيئة البيعة Hay’at al-Bay‘ah), also known as the Allegiance Commission or Allegiance Institution or Succession Commission, is the body responsible for determining future succession to the throne of Saudi Arabia. It was formed on 7 December 2007 by King Abdullah. At the time of its formation, the Council's intended function was to appoint a Crown Prince once a new King succeeds to the throne.

== History ==
Previously, under Chapter 2 of the Basic Law promulgated by King Fahd, the appointment of the next in line was the sole prerogative of the King:

The King chooses the Heir Apparent and relieves him of his duties by Royal order.

— Chapter 2, Article 5(c) of the Basic Law of Saudi Arabia.

The appointment of a successor by the King was usually done with some form of informal consensus among members of the royal family. However, after Prince Abdullah succeeded Fahd as King, the behind-the-scenes battles over the future of the monarchy intensified, particularly between Prince Abdullah and the Sudairi princes, including Prince Sultan and late Prince Nayef. Due to increasing uncertainty of succession beyond Prince Sultan, King Abdullah issued the Allegiance Institution Law in 2006, which formally established the Allegiance Council. The Council gave additional voice to members of the Al Saud family when a new King selects his Crown Prince. However, the implementation of the system was planned to start following the ascension of Crown Prince Sultan to the throne.

According to an October 2009 diplomatic cable from the U.S. Embassy in Riyadh, the Al Saud family described the Council as a "codification of the unwritten rules that have governed the selection of Saudi rulers since the passing of King Abdulaziz in 1953."

The role of the Council was intended to take effect once the late Prince Sultan succeeded to the throne. However, in 2009, when he was gravely ill with cancer, the late Prince Nayef was appointed Second Deputy Prime Minister (a position for the crown prince in waiting), presumably to keep the position of Crown Prince within the Sudairi faction. This led to uncertainty over the role of the Council. The appointment of Prince Nayef was openly questioned by Prince Talal.

The Council supposedly undertook its duties for the first time when Prince Sultan died in October 2011. One week after his death, King Abdullah announced that the Council had selected Prince Nayef as the new Crown Prince. However, the Council just swore allegiance to Nayef as Crown Prince. Whether it actually voted on the selection remained unclear.

Similar apparent dysfunctionality of the council was also observed in regard to the appointment of Prince Salman as Crown Prince in June 2012. Prince Talal stated that the princes on the Council were not consulted on the succession of Prince Salman and that the Council became ineffective.

When King Abdullah died in 2015, Salman became king and Prince Muqrin, the youngest surviving half brother, became Crown prince automatically, having been appointed deputy crown prince a year earlier.

== Role ==
Under the Allegiance Institution Law, the King nominates up to three candidates for the position of Crown Prince. The Allegiance Council then selects one of them as Crown Prince. If the Council rejects all of the King's nominees, it may nominate its own candidate. The Crown Prince will be then decided by a vote among the Council:

In the event that the King rejects the committee’s nominee, the Allegiance Institution will hold a vote to choose between the King’s candidate and its own in accordance with Sections A and B of this Article. The nominee who secures the majority of votes will be named Crown Prince.

— Article 7 of The Allegiance Institution Law.

The Council also preempts the possibility of the King becoming incapacitated. In the event the King permanently loses his ability to exercise his powers, the Council will declare the Crown Prince as King. If both the King and the Crown Prince become permanently incapacitated, the Council will form a five-member Transitory Ruling Council to temporarily assume administration of the Kingdom. The Council will also select a new King within seven days. Despite all these detailed legal description, the Council has never been activated and was not active in the appointments of the crown princes; in 2011, namely Prince Nayef and in 2012, namely Prince Salman.

The foundation of the Council was seen as way to diminish the influence of the Sudairi brothers, who could be easily outvoted in the Council. Despite this, the Sudairis are said to have influence over more than half the council members.

=== Influence of the Council ===
With the promotion of Crown Prince Sultan's three successors deemed automatic, and the King's writ on the subject of the appointment of the second deputy PM (the honorific "deputy crown prince" being much more recent than the position itself), the Council has proved to be little more than a "rubber stamp".

After almost a year with the post of second deputy Prime Minister vacant, Prince Muqrin was formally designated by royal decree in 2013. This meant that he was informally next in line, bypassing several senior princes. In order to make his place in the line of succession permanent and preclude any challenges by any of the dispossessed royals, King Abdullah polled each member of the Allegiance Council individually before announcing Maqrin's new title. The poll, which is considered an official vote, was 75% Yes and 25% No.

The royal decree stated that the election “may not be modified or changed in any way or form by any person whoever it may be”, precluding a King Salman from capriciously choosing someone else, which is exactly what would happen three months into the new reign.

Upon the death of King Abdullah, Prince Muqrin became Crown Prince automatically, and Salman decreed that his full nephew Muhammed bin Nayef become the first of his generation to be in the line of succession, the Council ratified this a few days later unanimously.

At the end of April 2015, barely three months into his reign, King Salman dismissed Prince Muqrin from his post as Crown Prince after the approval of the Allegiance Council which voted to declare Prince Mohammed bin Salman as the new Deputy Crown Prince.

== Membership ==
The members of the council include surviving sons of Ibn Saud, grandsons whose fathers are deceased, incapacitated or unwilling to assume the throne and the sons of the King and Crown Prince. As of 2025 the council had 34 members: 3 surviving sons of Ibn Saud, 28 of his grandsons and 3 of his great grandsons. Each grandson represents his deceased or incapacitated father.

Two of King Ibn Saud's sons, Prince Fawwaz and Prince Hamoud died without sons. Grandson of Turki I, Turki bin Faisal, died on 28 February 2009 and was replaced by his brother, Abdullah bin Faisal bin Turki until his death in 2019. He was then replaced by his brother Fahd bin Faisal bin Turki. Bandar bin Musaid also replaced his brother, Abdullah bin Musaid.

Prince Talal resigned from the Council three weeks after the appointment of Prince Nayef as Crown Prince in November 2011. His resignation meant one of his sons might take a position on the Council, in the future.

In December 2011, Saud bin Nayef was appointed as a member of the Council since his father, late Prince Nayef could not have a seat in the Council due to being then crown prince.

In March 2020, Abdulaziz bin Ahmed replaced his brother Nayef bin Ahmed, who had replaced their father Ahmed bin Abdulaziz in that position previously. Both of them were detained along with former Crown Prince Muhammad bin Nayef and his brother Nawwaf bin Nayef for treason charges.

The Council was chaired by Prince Mishaal, who had been excluded from the line of succession, until his death in 2017. Members of the Council swear an oath of allegiance to the King.

Sons of King Abdul-Aziz

- Prince Abdul Elah
- Prince Mashhur
- Prince Muqrin

Grandsons of King Abdul-Aziz

- Prince Khalid bin Faisal (son of King Faisal)
- Prince Badr bin Muhammad (son of Prince Muhammad)
- Prince Muhammad bin Nasser (son of Prince Nasser)
- Prince Faisal bin Khalid (son of King Khalid)
- Prince Muhammad bin Saad (son of Prince Saad)
- Prince Talal bin Mansour (son of Prince Mansour)
- Prince Faisal bin Bandar (son of Prince Bandar)
- Prince Bandar bin Musa'id (son of Prince Musa'id)
- Prince Khalid bin Abdullah (son of King Abdullah)
- Prince Saud bin Abdul Muhsin (son of Prince Abdul Muhsin)
- Prince Abdulaziz bin Mishaal (son of Prince Mishaal)
- Prince Khalid bin Sultan (son of Prince Sultan)
- Prince Turki bin Abdulrahman (son of Prince Abdul Rahman)
- Prince Mansour bin Mutaib (son of Prince Mutaib)
- Prince Khaled bin Talal (son of Prince Talal)
- Prince Muhammad bin Mishari (son of Prince Mishari)
- Prince Fahd bin Badr (son of Prince Badr)
- Prince Fahad bin Turki (son of Prince Turki)
- Prince Abdulaziz bin Nawaaf (son of Prince Nawwaf)
- Prince Saud bin Nayef (son of Prince Nayef)
- Crown Prince Mohammed bin Salman (son of King Salman)
- Prince Mishaal bin Majid (son of Prince Majid)
- Prince Faisal bin Thamir (son of Prince Thamir)
- Prince Nayef bin Mamdouh (son of Prince Mamdouh)
- Prince Abdulaziz bin Sattam (son of Prince Sattam)
- Prince Abdulaziz bin Ahmed (son of Prince Ahmed who is still alive)
- Prince Faisal bin Abdul Majeed (son of Prince Abdul Majeed)
- Prince Abdulaziz bin Hathloul (son of Prince Hathloul)

Great Grandsons of King Abdul-Aziz

- Prince Fahd bin Faisal bin Turki (grandson of Turki I of Nejd and Hejaz)
- Prince Faisal (grandson of King Saud)
- Prince Turki (grandson of King Fahd)

In June 2017, 31 out of 34 members approved the selection of Mohammad bin Salman as Crown Prince. Three members who voted against his selection were Ahmed bin Abdulaziz, Muhammad bin Saad and Abdulaziz bin Abdullah. The latter represented his older brother, Khalid bin Abdullah, at the meeting of the council.

== See also ==
- Succession to the Saudi Arabian throne
- Accession Council
- Royal Council of the Throne
