= Musa'id bin Abdulaziz Al Saud =

Saudi royal (1923–2013)

- Born: 26 June 1923
- Died: 19 August 2013 (aged 90)
- Spouse: Watfa bint Muhammad bin Talal Al Rashid; Fatima bint Hashim bin Turki
- Issue: List: Prince Khaled; Prince Faisal; Prince Bandar; Princess Al Jawhara; Prince Abdullah; Prince Abdul Rahman
Names
- Musa'id bin Abdulaziz bin Abdul Rahman bin Faisal Al Saud
- House: Al Saud
- Father: Abdulaziz of Saudi Arabia
- Mother: Jawhara bint Saad bin Abdul Muhsin Al Sudairi

Musa'id bin Abdulaziz Al Saud (Arabic: مساعد بن عبد العزيز آل سعود; 26 June 1923 – 19 August 2013) was the eleventh son of King Abdulaziz, the founder of Saudi Arabia. He was a businessman and the father of Faisal bin Musaid, the assassin of his half-brother King Faisal.

== Early life ==
Musa'id was born in 1923. His father was King Abdulaziz and his mother was Jawhara bint Saad bin Abdul Muhsin Al Sudairi. Before marrying King Abdulaziz, Jawhara had been married to his full brother Sa'ad bin Abdul Rahman until the latter's death in the Battle of Kanzan in 1915. After Jawhara's death, her sister Haya also married Abdulaziz. She was the mother of Prince Badr, Prince Abdul Majid and Prince Abdul Illah.

Musa'id had two full brothers, Prince Saad and Prince Abdul Muhsin, and one full sister, Princess Al Bandari.

== Personal life ==
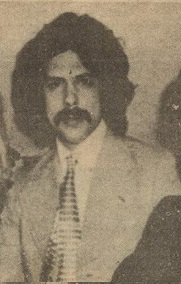
Prince Musa'id's son Faisal murdered King Faisal, a half-brother of Musa'id.

Following the discovery of oil in Saudi Arabia, Musa'id and his brothers began to live in several European cities, including Paris and London. During this period, Musa'id was caught in an inappropriate manner in Paris and was immediately sent back to Saudi Arabia. His father, King Abdulaziz, confined Musa'id to the palace which aggravated their relations, decreasing the latter's potential prospects to rule the country.

Musa'id married Watfa, a daughter of Muhammad bin Talal, the 12th (and last) Rashidi emir. Their son Faisal bin Musaid was born in Riyadh on 4 April 1944. He subsequently divorced Watfa. His sons and daughters by Watfa were much closer to their maternal Rashidi relatives than their paternal relatives, Al Sauds.

In 1965, Musa'id son Khaled, who was a fervent Wahhabite, was killed during a Riyadh protest against the introduction of television in Saudi Arabia. The details of his death are disputed. Some reports allege that he died resisting arrest outside his own home. No investigation over his death was ever initiated.

Musa'id had another son, Bandar, and a daughter, Al Jawhara. Prince Bandar became a member of the Allegiance Council in May 2014. He also had another son Abdul Rahman bin Musaid from a subsequent marriage. Abdullah bin Musa'id, another son, is a businessman and the owner of Sheffield United.

== Assassination of King Faisal ==
On 25 March 1975 Musa'id's son Faisal went to the Royal Palace in Riyadh, where King Faisal was holding a majlis. He joined a Kuwaiti delegation and lined up to meet the king. The king recognized his nephew and bent his head forward, so that the younger Faisal could kiss the king's head in a sign of respect. The prince took out a revolver from his robe and shot the King twice in the head. His third shot missed and he threw the gun away. King Faisal fell to the floor. Bodyguards with swords and submachine guns arrested the prince. The king was quickly rushed to a hospital but doctors failed to save him.

Initial reports described Prince Faisal as "mentally deranged." He was moved to a Riyadh prison. He was deemed sane to be tried. He was found guilty of murder. Hours after the verdict, he was publicly decapitated in Riyadh. The assassin's brother Bandar was also imprisoned, but was released a year later.

== Later life ==
Prince Musa'id did not hold any significant administrative positions and hence he was sidelined for the throne. The involvement of his son Faisal in the assassination of King Faisal could also have weakened his position. In addition he seemingly never sought one. He gradually lost his eyesight after the death of his first son, Khalid. He lived an austere private life where he was known to be pious.

== Death ==
The Royal Diwan announced that Prince Musa'id had died on 19 August 2013. He was the second eldest living son of King Abdulaziz at the time of his death next only to Prince Bandar bin Abdulaziz Al Saud. It was announced that funeral prayers for the late prince would be held at Imam Turki bin Abdullah Mosque in Riyadh the next day and a three-day mourning period was also declared.
