= Saad bin Abdulaziz Al Saud =

Saudi royal (1915–1993)

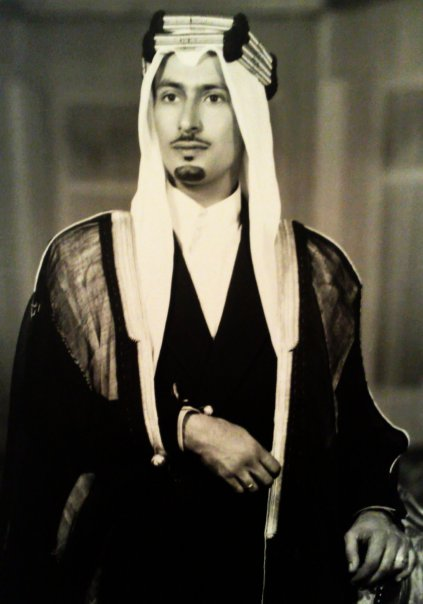

Governor of Asir Province
- In office 1941–1960
- Monarchs: King Abdulaziz; King Saud

Personal details
- Born: 1915 Riyadh, Emirate of Nejd and Hasa
- Died: 23 July 1993 (aged 77–78) Riyadh, Saudi Arabia
- Children: Prince Fahd; Prince Mohammed; Princess Jawhara; Prince Saud; Princess Noura; Prince Khalid; Princess Fahda; Prince Faisal; Prince Abdulaziz; Prince Abdullah; Prince Sultan; Princess Latifa
- Parents: King Abdulaziz (father); Jawhara bint Saad bin Abdul Muhsin Al Sudairi (mother)

Saad bin Abdulaziz Al Saud (Arabic: سعد بن عبد العزيز آل سعود; 1915 – 23 July 1993) was a former governor of 'Asir and a member of House of Saud. He was also a former chairman of royal family council of Al Saud. The council was created to look after the members of the Saudi royal family and was not related to any political issues.

== Early life and education ==
Prince Saad was born in Qasr Al Hukm, Riyadh, in 1915 as the seventh son of King Abdulaziz. However, there is another report, citing his birth year as 1920. His mother was Jawhara bint Saad Al Sudairi. She was widow of Saad bin Abdul Rahman, full brother of King Abdulaziz. Prince Saad had two full brothers – Prince Abdul Muhsin and Prince Musa'id. Al Bandari bint Abdulaziz was his full sister.

Jawhara bint Saad was the sister of Haya bint Saad who was another spouse of King Abdulaziz and the mother of Prince Badr, Prince Abdul Majid and Prince Abdul Illah.

== Military career ==
Sa'ad's first experience of war came in the Battle of Sabilla against Ikhwan in 1929, when he was severely wounded, having been shot twice in the knee. The injury forced his uncle Prince Muhammed bin Abdul Rahman, who was in the battle as well to carry him outside where he transferred to Taif and stayed one month for treatment. After Sa'ad was fully treated, His father Abdulaziz sent him again to Prince Mohammed to train more on wars until 1931 when his father decided to appoint him as deputy commander of the battle of Jizan, which ended in victory and unification of the Kingdom in 1932.

== Emirate and province of Khamis Mushait ==
After the Battle of Jizan and the unification of the Kingdom, he was appointed by his father the governor of the province of Khamis Mushait, and was at the time at the age of eighteen. In 1935, Sa'ad worked to protect Khamis Mushayt from attacks of Mutawakkilite Kingdom of Yemen, where at the time Saudi–Yemeni War is held. Sa'ad Sent 400 men to the south-west of Khamis Mushayt, and because of the ongoing attacks by Yemeni, King Abdul Aziz supplied more arms and ammunition, and when Yemeni realized that aid to Khamis Mushayt battle turned into a big loss they decided to surrender.

== Emirate of Asir ==
In 1941, Prince Saad was appointed governor of the Asir. The province under Sa'ad made integrated urban renaissance, where wells were drilled and excavated, building markets and trading. The region has also seen at the end of his reign the construction of many dams to preserve the water of rains. As a ruler of Asir, Saad developed the air defense with the help of the Defence Minister Prince Mansour bin Abdulaziz, who sent civilian and military aircraft in the 1940s and 1950s. He remained in this position until 1960 when he was appointed a deputy interior minister for security affairs. His term lasted until 1987.

Prince Saad was not given any other significant political position due to his weak and negligible character like his half-brother Prince Bandar. However, Prince Saad remained head of the royal family council until his death in 1993.

== Succession ==
As a son of King Abdulaziz, Prince Saad was a potential successor to the Saudi Arabian throne. However, he and his half-brother Nasser were sidelined in favour of their younger half-brother Fahd, who was appointed crown prince in 1975. Both Prince Saad and Prince Nasser were regarded as weak contenders due to being less experienced in government affairs than Prince Fahd.

== Personal life ==
Prince Saad married many times, and some of his wives are as follows:

- Princess Wadha Al Hamoud Al Faisal Al Hamoud Al Obaid Al Rasheed Al Shammar. Prince Faisal and Abdulaziz's mother
- Princess Moudi bint Ali Al Hamoud Al Sabhan Al Shammar, mother of Prince Fahd, Princess Al Jawhara, and Princess Noura
- Princess Munira bint Fahd bin Khothiefah bin Fahad Al Qahtani. Prince Saud's mother
- Princess Wadha bint Melhi Alqdaan Al Arjani Al Ajmi who died in August 2012 at age of 85. Prince Khalid's mother
- Princess Jazwa bint Saud bin Kharssan Al Shamer Al Ajmi, Prince Mohammed's mother
- Princess Noura Abdul Lateef Nader Shah, mother of Prince Abdullah, Prince Sultan and Princess Latifa

In May 1992 Prince Saad and his wife, Princess Noura, caused a controversy when their employee accused them of abusing in their residence in Houston, Texas.

His son, Mohammed bin Saad, is a former advisor of Prince Nayef and deputy governor of Riyadh Province. His other son, Abdulaziz, is former deputy governor of the Hail Region. He was named the governor of the Hail Region in 2017 replacing Saud bin Abdul Muhsin Al Saud in the post.

Daughter of Prince Saad, Princess Al Jawhara, is married to Prince Sultan bin Mohammed bin Saud Al Kabeer.

== Death ==
Prince Saad died in Jeddah on 23 July 1993. He was buried in Al Oud cemetery in Riyadh.
