= Nayef =

Nayef (Arabic: نايف) is a masculine given name and surname of Arabic origin. Notable people with the name include:

== Given name ==
- Nayef bin Abdulaziz (1934–2012), Saudi royal and politician
- Nayef Aguerd (born 1996), Moroccan football player
- Nayef al-Bakri (born 1975), Yemeni politician
- Nayef Al-Daihani (born 1956), Kuwaiti sport shooter
- Nayef Al-Fayez, Jordanian politician
- Nayef Mohamed Hameed (1929–??), Iraqi athlete
- Nayef Hawatmeh (born 1938), Jordanian politician and founder of the Democratic Front for the Liberation of Palestine
- Nayef bin Sultan Al Kabeer (born 1975), Saudi businessman
- Nayef Saoud Faris Al Kadi (born 1944), Jordanian politician and ambassador
- Nayef Mubarak Al Khater (born 1978), Qatari football player
- Nayef Rajoub (born 1958), Palestinian politician
- Nayef Rashed (born 1949), British actor
- Nayef bin Ahmed Al Saud (born 1965), Saudi royal and security officer
- Nayef bin Mamdouh Al Saud (born 1971), Saudi royal
- Nayef bin Fawwaz Al Sha'lan (born 1956), Saudi diplomat and businessman
- Nayef Steitieh (born 1965), Jordanian politician
- Nayef bin Bandar Al Sudairi (born 1963) Saudi Arabian diplomat
- Nayef Shindakh Thamer (died 2003), Iraqi politician

== Surname ==
- Prince Asem bin Al Nayef (born 1948), Jordanian prince
- Badr Salem Nayef (born 1972), Qatari weightlifter
- Talal Nayef (born 1985), Kuwaiti footballer

== See also ==
- Naif (name)
