= Ahmed bin Abdulaziz Al Saud =

Saudi royal and politician (born 1942)

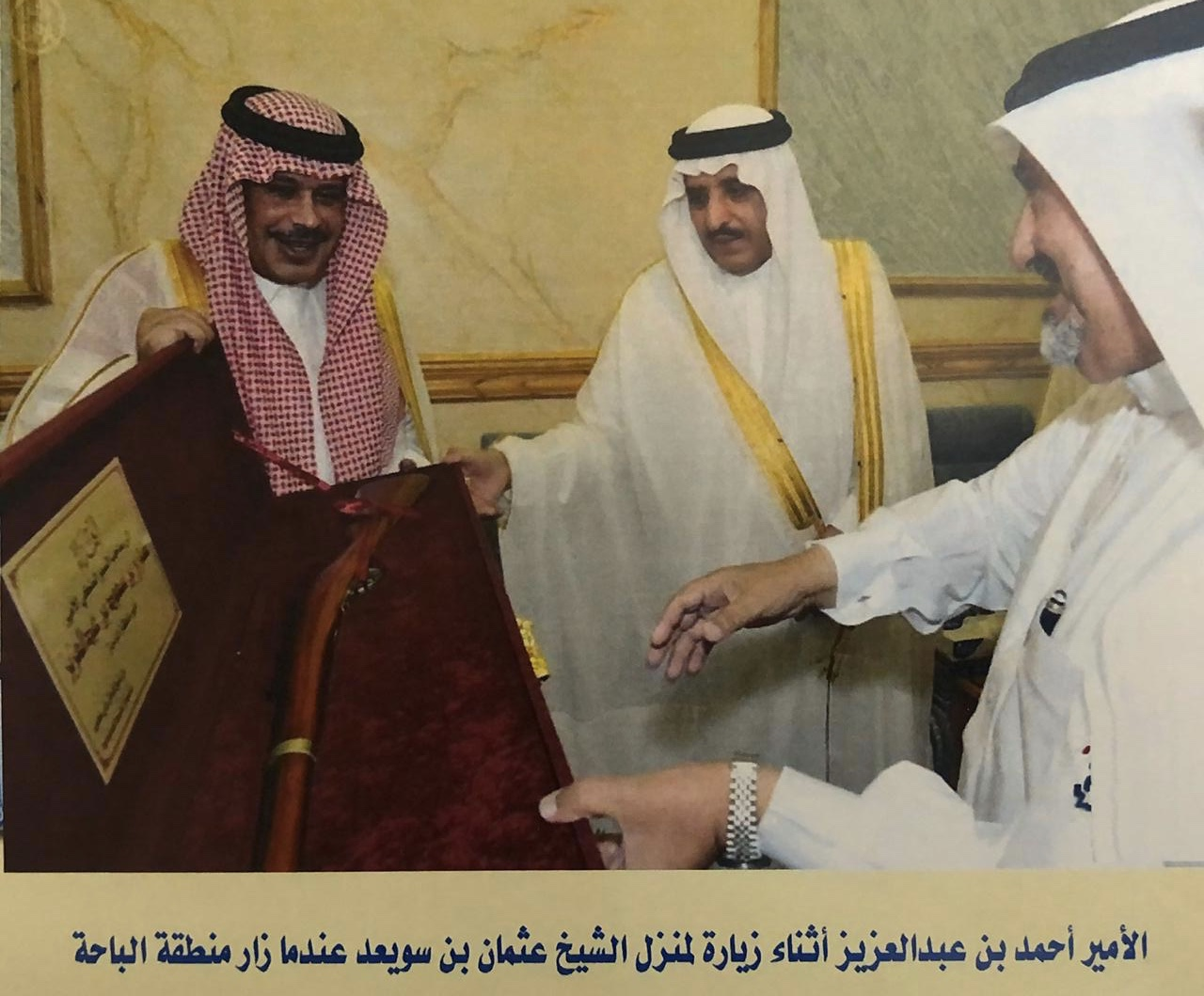
- Prince Ahmed (center)

Minister of Interior
- Tenure: 18 June 2012 – 5 November 2012
- Prime Minister: King Abdullah
- Predecessor: Nayef bin Abdulaziz
- Successor: Mohammed bin Nayef

Deputy Minister of Interior
- Tenure: 16 December 1975 – 18 June 2012
- Prime Minister: King Khalid; King Fahd; King Abdullah
- Successor: Abdul Rahman Al Rabiaan

Deputy Governor of Mecca Province
- Tenure: 1971–1975
- Appointed by: King Faisal
- Born: 5 September 1942 (age 84); Riyadh, Saudi Arabia
- Issue: 12, including Abdulaziz and Nayef
Names
- Ahmed bin Abdulaziz bin Abdul Rahman bin Faisal Al Saud
- House: Al Saud
- Alma mater: University of Redlands
- Father: King Abdulaziz
- Mother: Hassa bint Ahmed Al Sudairi

Prince Ahmed bin Abdulaziz Al Saud (Arabic: احمد بن عبد العزيز آل سعود Aḥmed bin ʿAbdulʿazīz Āl Suʿūd; born 5 September 1942) is a member of House of Saud who served as deputy minister of interior from 1975 to 2012 and briefly as minister of interior in 2012. He was detained in March 2020 on the orders of his brother and nephew, King Salman and Crown Prince Mohammed bin Salman, respectively, and charged with treason.

== Early life and education ==
Prince Ahmed was born in Riyadh on 5 September 1942. He is the son of King Abdulaziz (Ibn Saud) and Hassa bint Ahmed Al Sudairi, and is the youngest of the Sudairi brothers. Prince Ahmed is supposedly the 31st son of King Abdulaziz.

Ahmed bin Abdulaziz completed secondary education in 1961. He studied English and some science subjects at the University of Southern California. He enrolled at the University of Redlands in 1962 and graduated in 1968 with a bachelor's degree in government and political science.

== Early career ==
After his graduation, Prince Ahmed dealt with business and was the chairman of the National Gypsum Company from 1969 to 1970. In 1971, he was appointed the undersecretary of Makkah Province. He also served as the deputy governor of Makkah Province during the reign of King Faisal.

== Deputy interior minister (1975–2012) ==
Later, King Khalid appointed him as the deputy minister of interior on 16 December 1975.

As deputy interior minister (also translated as vice minister), he served under Interior Minister Prince Nayef bin Abdulaziz Al Saud; at the time, Prince Muhammad bin Nayef was assistant interior minister. The interior ministry played a key role in Saudi Arabia's state security apparatus (with a total 2003 internal security budget of US$7 billion), with a counterterrorism mandate, especially after the Riyadh compound bombings of May 2003. A 2004 report by the Center for Strategic and International Studies noted that although corruption within the kingdom was common, "Prince Nayif and Prince Ahmad are reported to pay massive bonuses to successful security officers, but also have a reputation for honesty and using the massive security budget only for the mission and not to enrich themselves."

His main function as deputy interior minister was to deal with the different provinces of the Kingdom. Ahmed bin Abdulaziz was also operational head of special security force, which reports directly to the interior minister. This force was established in 1979 after the Saudi Arabian National Guard's poor response to the seizure of the Grand Mosque in Mecca.

In the early 1980s, in the wake of the riots in the Eastern Province in 1979, Prince Ahmed was tasked with introducing reforms to improve the province, where the kingdom's Shi'ite minority lives. Prince Ahmad acknowledged that the Saudi government had neglected the region and had discriminated against Shi'ites; he also promised massive investments in the development of Al Hasa's economic infrastructure, educational system, and other services. The other task of Prince Ahmed as deputy interior minister was to coordinate the contacts with ulema (the religious leaders). He also served as the vice president of the supreme commission for industrial security and chairman of preparatory committee for national security. In addition, he was the deputy chairman of civil defense council.

In 2006, Prince Ahmed called for construction of a fence along the Iraq–Saudi Arabia border, which he said was not a "segregation wall" but a border security measure.

Saudi journalist Jamal Khashoggi stated that Prince Ahmed was mostly involved in administrative matters instead of security during his tenure as deputy interior minister. Ahmed bin Abdulaziz visited Pakistan in November 2005 for three days and examined the extent of destruction caused by the Kashmir earthquake from an airplane. He promised to provide Pakistan whatever needed for the rebuilding process after the earthquake. He encouraged all Muslim nations to provide aid to Pakistan. He also condemned terrorism and stated it was incompatible with Islam.

Prince Ahmed said in a press conference in 2011 that for women, driving is against the law. After his appointment as interior minister, it was argued that, like Salman, he was also a supporter of King Abdullah's cautious reform initiatives.

== Interior minister (June–November 2012) ==
On 18 June 2012, one day after the burial of Interior Minister Prince Nayef bin Abdulaziz, King Abdullah promoted Prince Ahmed to interior minister. Abdul Rahman Al Rabiaan succeeded him as deputy interior minister. At the same time, Abdullah elevated Defense Minister Prince Salman to the position of crown prince, keeping the defense portfolio.

It was reported that Prince Ahmed would not change Saudi Arabia's major security policies, which focused on threats from al-Qaeda in Yemen and an unrest among the Shi'ite Muslim minority in Saudi Arabia. Prince Ahmed was the chairman of the supreme hajj committee during his term as interior minister.

=== Speculation about succession ===
Nawaf E. Obaid argued in 2002 that three members of the House of Saud were especially popular, although many of them were believed to be corrupt. Prince Ahmed was one of these popular members; the others were Prince Abdullah (then crown prince) and Prince Salman (then Riyadh governor). Prince Ahmed was also seen as one of the potential candidates to the Saudi throne at the beginning of the 2000s. His appointment as interior minister in 2012 was also regarded at the time as a signal for the succession to the Saudi Arabian throne, with Ahmed deemed the most likely candidate to rule Saudi Arabia after King Abdullah and Crown Prince Salman.

=== Ouster and exclusion from the succession ===
On 5 November 2012, Prince Ahmed was removed as interior minister, after a tenure of just a few months. Mohammed bin Nayef, who had been deputy interior minister, was named his successor. The ouster left Ahmed sidelined from power and without any major job. The official reason for Prince Ahmed's removal was given as his request. However, Ahmed's objection to dividing the security forces into independent units was one of the actual reasons for his dismissal.

On 1 February 2013 Prince Muqrin was appointed second deputy prime minister and on 27 March 2014 to the new position of deputy crown prince.

== Purge ==
=== Activities from 2015 to 2019 ===
After being removed from power in 2012, Ahmed spent six years in retirement, frequently traveling to London. In 2015, Crown Prince Salman became king, after the death of King Abdullah. At age 79, Salman's declining health fueled a bitter succession battle within the House of Saud. A reformist faction within the Saudi royal family favored Prince Ahmed for the position of crown prince, arguing that by birthright, Ahmed held a more legitimate claim to the throne than either Crown Prince Muhammad bin Nayef (MBN) or his rival, the young Deputy Crown Prince Mohammed bin Salman (MBS), one of Salman's sons. Some conservatives within the Saudi royal family favored Prince Muqrin bin Abdulaziz as a candidate for the throne. Ultimately, MBS gained the upper hand, acquiring key portfolios, access to the king's advisors, and the lead role in commanding the Saudi military campaign in Yemen.

MBS was appointed crown prince in June 2017, replacing MBN. Ahmed bin Abdulaziz was one of three members of the Allegiance Council who did not support MBS's appointment as crown prince. The others were Muhammad bin Saad Al Saud and Abdulaziz bin Abdullah bin Abdulaziz Al Saud. The latter represented his older brother, Khalid bin Abdullah, at the meeting of the council.

After becoming crown prince, MBS rapidly consolidated power, and removed potential rivals within the royal house. In 2018 Ahmed bin Abdulaziz left Saudi Arabia for London. On 4 September 2018, after being confronted by protesters outside his residence in London, shouting slogans against the House of Saud's role in the humanitarian crisis in Yemen, Ahmed responded, "What does this have to do with the Al Saud? Those responsible are the king and his crown prince." While in Europe, he was openly critical of MBS, and reportedly met with members of dissenting factions within the Saudi royal house, which includes thousands of members.

On October 30, 2018, after MBS came under increasing pressure following the assassination of Jamal Khashoggi, Ahmed returned to Saudi Arabia after U.S. and European authorities obtained assurances of Ahmed's security from Saudi authorities. Ahmed's return was viewed as a significant signal of maneuvering within the royal house, given his rank and seniority as Salman's last living full brother.

=== Arrest and detention ===
On 7 March 2020 Prince Ahmed was arrested along with his son, Nayef bin Ahmed, and his nephews, MBN and Nawwaf bin Nayef. The Saudi government claimed that the princes were plotting to overthrow Salman and MBS. The detention of the senior princes was seen as a culmination of a purge that left MBS in unquestioned control of the kingdom. Prince Ahmed apparently remains in detention, although in May 2022 Ahmed's eldest son, Prince Abdulaziz bin Ahmed (who has no formal government post), appeared with MBS as part of a Saudi delegation that traveled to Abu Dhabi in the United Arab Emirates, in what was seen as a message intended to signal family unity.

== Family and personal life ==
Ahmed bin Abdulaziz has two wives with whom he has five daughters and seven sons. One of his wives is Fahda bint Turki Al Sudairi. His eldest son, Abdulaziz, is former secretary general of Arab Ophthalmology and was born in Redlands, California, when Prince Ahmed was attending the University of Redlands. Another son, Nayef, holds a PhD from Cambridge University and was a colonel in the Saudi Armed Forces with responsibilities for strategic planning. He served as the head of land forces intelligence and security authority until his arrest on 7 March 2020. Another son, Prince Sultan, was appointed Saudi ambassador to Bahrain in September 2019.

One of Prince Ahmed's daughters, Falwa bint Ahmed, is married to Salman bin Sultan, former assistant general secretary of the National Security Council. Another, Noura, was the former wife of Faisal bin Abdullah Al Saud. Noura bint Ahmed, who was born in Redlands, California, in November 1968 is the third child of Prince Ahmed. Her mother is Fahda bint Turki Al Sudairi; she is the full sister of Abdulaziz bin Ahmed.

On 29 November 2010, he attended the Crown Prince Cup, an annual horse race on behalf of Crown Prince Sultan who was in Morocco.

Political offices
Preceded by Nayef bin Abdulaziz Al Saud	Minister of Interior; June – November 2012	Succeeded by Mohammed bin Nayef
