= Muqrin bin Abdulaziz =

Saudi royal, military official and former Crown Prince (born 1945)

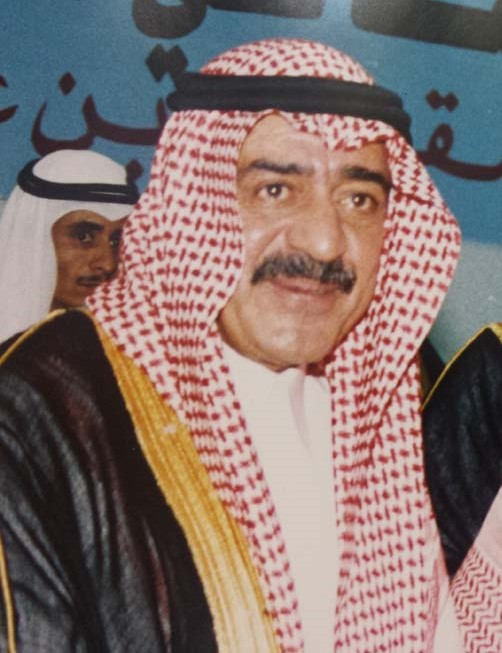
- Prince Muqrin

Crown Prince of Saudi Arabia; First Deputy Prime Minister
- Tenure: 23 January 2015 – 29 April 2015
- King and Prime Minister: Salman
- Predecessor: Salman bin Abdulaziz
- Successor: Muhammad bin Nayef

Deputy Crown Prince of Saudi Arabia; Second Deputy Prime Minister
- Tenure: 27 March 2014 – 23 January 2015
- King and Prime Minister: Abdullah
- Predecessor: Nayef bin Abdulaziz (as second deputy prime minister)
- Successor: Muhammad bin Nayef

Director General of Al Mukhabarat Al A'amah
- Tenure: October 2005 – 19 July 2012
- Monarch: Abdullah
- Predecessor: Nawwaf bin Abdulaziz
- Successor: Bandar bin Sultan

Governor of Madinah Province
- Tenure: 1999–2005
- Appointed by: King Fahd
- Predecessor: Abdul Majeed bin Abdulaziz
- Successor: Abdulaziz bin Majid

Governor of Hail Province
- Tenure: 1980–1999
- Appointed by: King Khalid
- Predecessor: Nasser Al Sheikh
- Successor: Saud bin Abdul Muhsin
- Born: 15 September 1945 (age 81); Riyadh, Saudi Arabia
- Spouse: Abta bint Hamoud Al Rashid
- Issue Detail: 14
Names
- Muqrin bin Abdulaziz bin Abdul Rahman bin Faisal Al Saud
- House: Al Saud
- Father: King Abdulaziz
- Mother: Baraka Al Yamaniyah
- Occupation: Politician • businessman • air force pilot
- Military service
- Branch: Royal Saudi Air Force
- Service years: 1965–1980

Muqrin bin Abdulaziz Al Saud (Arabic: مقرن بن عبدالعزيز آل سعود, romanized: Muqrin ibn 'Abd al 'Azīz Āl Su'ūd; born 15 September 1945) is a Saudi Arabian politician, businessman, and former military aviator who was briefly Crown Prince of Saudi Arabia from January to April 2015, during the first three months of his half-brother King Salman's reign. He is the 35th son of King Abdulaziz, born to Abdulaziz's Yemeni concubine Baraka. Since the death of Abdulaziz's 36th son Hamoud in 1994, Muqrin has been the youngest surviving son of the king.

Prince Muqrin served as the director general of Al Mukhabarat Al A'amah from 2005 to 2012. In July 2012, he was appointed King Abdullah's advisor and special envoy with the rank of minister. On 27 March 2014, he was named deputy crown prince making him second in the line of succession behind his half-brother Salman. On 23 January 2015, upon King Abdullah's death and the accession of Salman, Muqrin became crown prince and first deputy prime minister. Only three months later, on 29 April 2015, King Salman dismissed Muqrin, replacing him with his nephew Muhammad bin Nayef.

== Early life and education ==
Muqrin bin Abdulaziz was born in Riyadh on 15 September 1945. He is the 35th son of King Abdulaziz. His mother, Baraka Al Yamaniyah, was a Yemeni of African descent and was a concubine of King Abdulaziz. She died in Riyadh on 22 August 2018.

Muqrin studied at the Riyadh Model Institute. He then went to Britain's RAF College Cranwell and graduated with a degree in aeronautics at the rank of flight lieutenant in 1968. He also received a diploma from the General Staff course in the United States in 1974.

== Career ==
Muqrin bin Abdulaziz was an air force pilot. In 1965, he joined the Royal Saudi Air Force (RSAF). He was named commander of the RSAF's 2nd air squadron in 1970. He had served in several positions in the RSAF from 1973 to 1977 before being appointed the adjutant to the director of air operations. He then was elevated to president of operations and planning for the RSAF. He left the RSAF in 1980.

=== Governorship ===
On 18 March 1980, King Khalid appointed Prince Muqrin as governor of Hail replacing Nasser Al Sheikh in the post, and his tenure lasted until 1999. During his tenure Prince Muqrin reformed the local government of Hail with the assistance from the Institute of Public Administration and improved the living conditions of the tribes in the region. He also contributed to the agricultural activities of the region.

On 24 November 1999, Prince Muqrin was appointed governor of Madinah Province as a successor to Abdul Majeed bin Abdulaziz. King Fahd ordered him to modernize the city in response to a wave of anti-government and anti-royalty demonstrations during Hajj. Prince Muqrin developed the education and health care services offered in remote regions. As governor, Prince Muqrin was considered a traditionalist. He remained in office until October 2005. Abdulaziz bin Majid succeeded him as governor of Madinah Province.

=== Director General of Al Mukhabarat Al A'amah ===
On 22 October 2005, King Abdullah appointed Prince Muqrin as director general of Saudi Arabia's intelligence agency Al Mukhabarat Al A'amah. His appointment occurred nine months after the resignation of the former director general Prince Nawwaf.

Prince Muqrin organized a conference on combating internet militancy, particularly used by al Qaeda in 2007. He further declared that Al Mukhabarat al A'amah would set a website to inform citizens about threats to security and that the organization would be restructured to combat with AQAP. He successfully expelled Islamist militants from Saudi Arabia. On 19 July 2012, Prince Muqrin was relieved from his post and replaced by Bandar bin Sultan. It was argued by media that Prince Muqrin had been criticized during his term due to his approach towards some sensitive issues. On the other hand, Prince Muqrin was named advisor at the rank of minister and a special envoy to King Abdullah the same day. His responsibility was stated to be the affairs in southeast Asia.

==== Activities ====
Prince Muqrin played an active role in Pakistani politics during his term at the Al Mukhabarat Al A'amah. After Pervez Musharraf's 1999 military coup on Nawaz Sharif, the Saudi government arranged a ten-year agreement with Pervez Musharraf to accept Nawaz Sharif as an exile. Because of Benazir Bhutto's early return from exile and the upcoming 2008 elections, Sharif attempted to return to Pakistan in 2007 against the advice of Prince Muqrin. However, Sharif was quickly deported from Pakistan and was greeted by Muqrin bin Abdulaziz at the Jeddah airport. Prince Muqrin was also involved in political reconciliation efforts in Pakistan.

On the other hand, Muqrin bin Abdulaziz and then foreign minister Prince Saud Al Faisal were reported to be in favor of pushing the sanctions against Iran instead of military action as King Abdullah insisted. However, Prince Muqrin also argued that Iran's interference in internal Gulf affairs, especially Iran's move in regard to nuclear arms, had very negative effects on the region and therefore, might cause an arms race among the Gulf states.

=== Business activities ===
Muqrin bin Abdulaziz also has business activities. He was one of the founders of the Dar Al Maal Al Islami Trust which was initiated by Mohammed bin Faisal Al Saud, King Faisal's son, in 1981. During his tenure as the governor of Hail province, he founded Hail Agricultural Development Company in 1982. In the late 1980s, the company was the largest wheat producer in the country.

== Succession ==
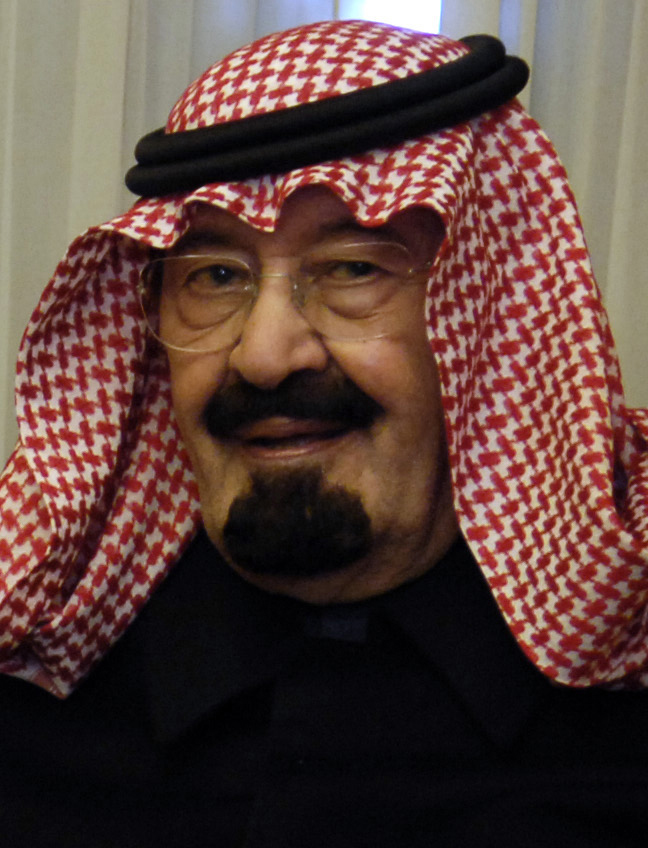
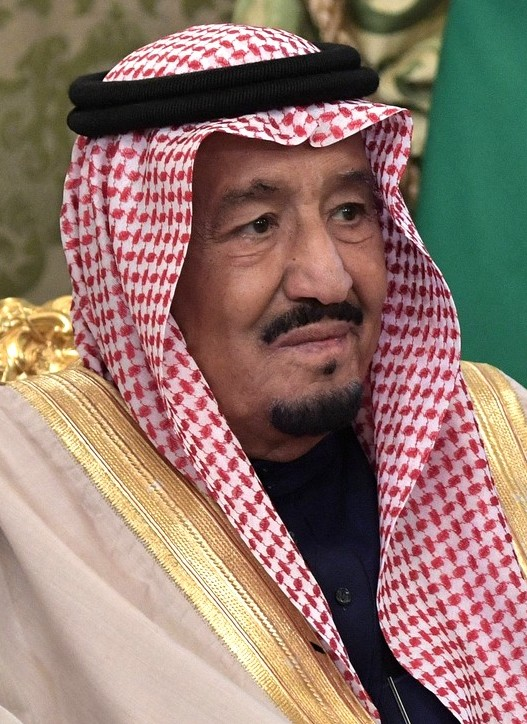
Prince Muqrin's older half-brother King Abdullah (left) named him as deputy crown prince, while another of his half-brothers, King Salman (right), named him as crown prince.

=== Eligibility ===
Given his governmental experience, Prince Muqrin was considered a candidate for accession to the throne (after Sultan bin Abdulaziz, the crown prince since 2005, fell ill in 2011). However, his maternal line was seen as a factor curtailing Muqrin's chance of becoming king; his mother was a Yemeni maidservant, and he did not belong to the dominant Sudairi faction of the royal house. He was considered a longtime ally and confidant of King Abdullah, and a liberal within the family. However, the Institute for Gulf Affairs reported in 2012 that, in an exchange of letters with his half-brother, Crown Prince Nayef bin Abdulaziz, Prince Muqrin argued for a harsher response to Shia unrest in the Eastern Province, an approach apparently vetoed by the crown prince.

=== Second Deputy Prime Minister ===
Prince Muqrin was appointed as second deputy prime minister by King Abdullah on 1 February 2013, although he was not seen as a potential contender for the post by analysts. This post, which had been vacant since October 2011, is regarded as second in line to the Saudi throne. In practical terms, in this role Prince Muqrin was expected to handle daily running of the country whenever King Abdullah and Crown Prince Salman were out of the country or could not deal with daily administrative affairs due to health concerns. In addition to the post of second deputy prime minister, Prince Muqrin kept his other two previous posts, namely adviser to and special envoy of King Abdullah.

=== Deputy Crown Prince ===
After almost a year with the post of second deputy prime minister vacant, Prince Muqrin was formally designated by royal decree in 2013. This meant that he was informally next in line, bypassing several senior princes. In order to make his place in the line of succession permanent and preclude any challenges by any of the dispossessed royals, King Abdullah polled each member of the Allegiance Council individually before announcing Muqrin's new title. Three-quarters of the Council members supported Prince Muqrin's new post.

Prince Muqrin's nomination, according to Reuters, gave more assurance to the kingdom's long-term succession process, proving prophetic with the efficient change of power upon the death of King Abdullah and the accession of King Salman on 23 January 2015.

=== Crown Prince ===
Prince Muqrin became Crown Prince of Saudi Arabia and first deputy prime minister on 23 January 2015 when King Abdullah died. On 29 April 2015, after a tenure of barely three months, King Salman relieved Muqrin (his half-brother) of his position as crown prince, and replaced him with his nephew, Mohammed bin Nayef (MBN), who had previously been deputy crown prince. This marked a generational shift: the first time that a grandson (rather than a son) of dynastic founder Ibn Saud had been selected as heir apparent. Salman simultenously elevated Prince Mohammed bin Salman (MBS), then in his 30s, to the post of deputy crown prince. Saudi state media said that Muqrin was removed at his own request. While Muqrin had been viewed as a transitional figure, observers viewed his rapid removal as a surprise.

After his firing as crown prince, Muqrin was reportedly granted lavish gifts, including US$800 million, and in 2016, the Solandge, a 280-foot yacht. Muqrin's treatment upon his ouster as crown prince was far different than that later accorded to MBN, who—after being ousted in a palace coup in 2017 led by MBS—was placed under house arrest, and had much of his wealth seized.

== Personal life ==
Prince Muqrin is married to Abta bint Hamoud Al Rashid. She was president of the Women's Council when Prince Muqrin was Madinah governor.

He has 14 children. His daughters are Mudahawi, Sara, Mishail, Abta, Nuf, Lamiya, Jawahir, and Sara. His sons are Fahd, Abdulaziz, Faysal, Turki, Mansour and Bandar. Prince Turki founded a real-estate company in Turkey. He is a pilot and CEO of Rabigh Wings Aviation Academy in Jeddah. Prince Turki is also a board member of the Saudi Aviation Club.

Muqrin bin Abdulaziz is said to enjoy astronomy, literature and Arabic poetry and has a large library containing thousands of books.

Prince Muqrin purchased four real estate properties about 7,700 square meters in Dlebta, Lebanon, following the approval of the cabinet in 2012 and the publishing of the listed sale in the official gazette. Dlebta's residents objected to the deal and filed a complaint with the relevant authorities.

== Honors ==
Prince Muqrin is the recipient of several decorations, including King Abdulaziz Sash and the Order of Merit from the Egyptian Military Air Force.

Saudi Arabian royalty
Preceded by Salman bin Abdulaziz	Crown Prince of Saudi Arabia; 23 January 2015 – 29 April 2015	Succeeded by Muhammad bin Nayef
Political offices
Preceded by Nasser bin Abdullah Al Ash Shaikh	Governor of Hail Province; 1980–1999	Succeeded by Saud bin Abdul Muhsin
Preceded by Abdul Majeed bin Abdulaziz	Governor of Madinah Province; 1999–2005	Succeeded by Abdulaziz bin Majid
Preceded by Nawwaf bin Abdulaziz	President of Al Mukhabarat Al A'amah; 2005–2012	Succeeded by Bandar bin Sultan
Preceded by Office established	Saudi Arabian Special Envoy; 2012–2015	Succeeded by Saud bin Faisal
Preceded by Nayef bin Abdulaziz	Second Deputy Prime Minister; 2013–2015	Succeeded by Muhammad bin Nayef
Preceded by Salman bin Abdulaziz	First Deputy Prime Minister; January-April 2015	Succeeded by Muhammad bin Nayef
