= Lolowah bint Faisal Al Saud =

Saudi Arabian royal (born 1948)

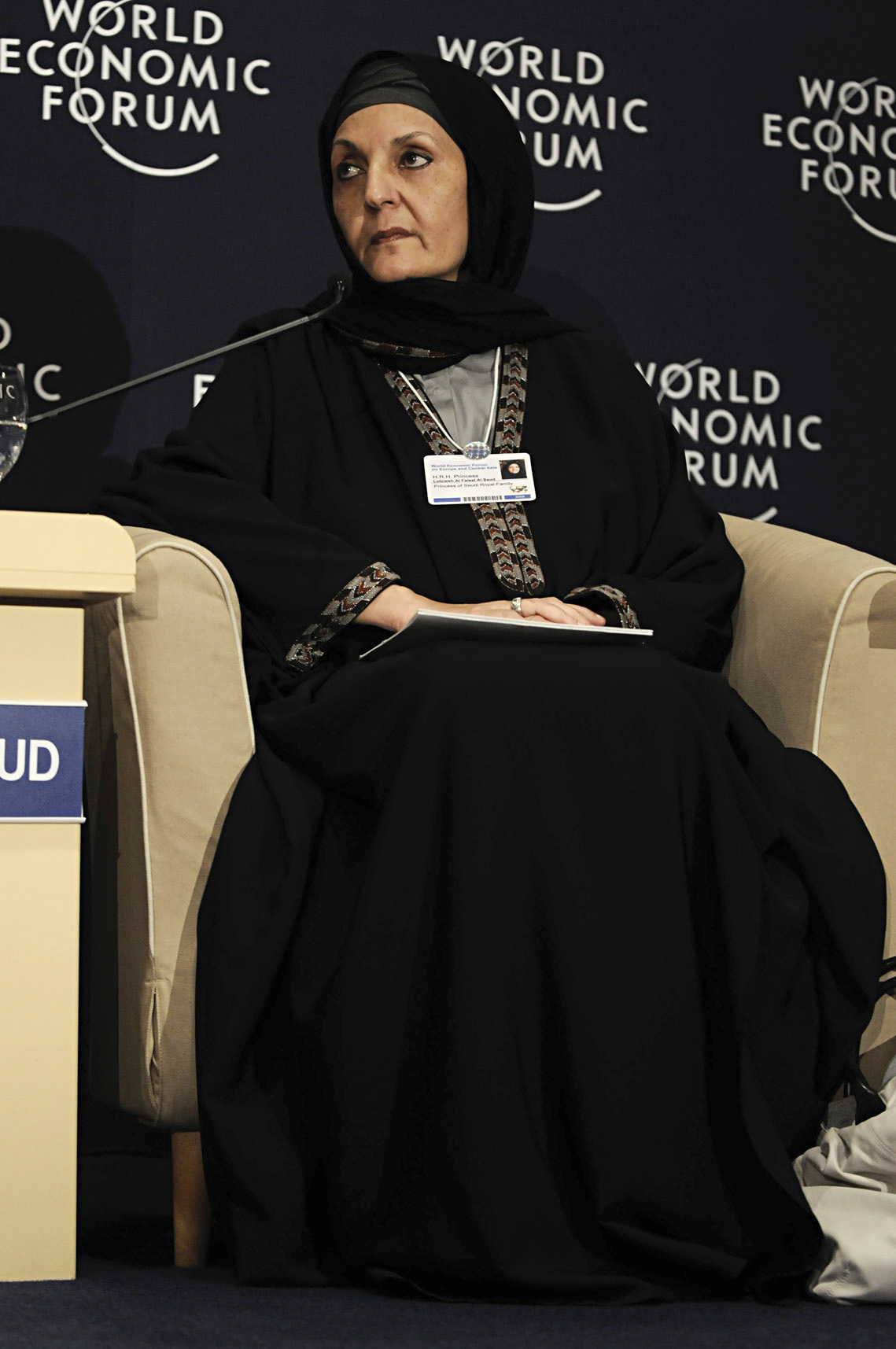
- Princess Lolowah at the 2008 World Economic Forum regional meeting in Turkey
- Born: 1948 (age 77–78); Ta'if, Saudi Arabia
- Spouse: Saud bin Abdul Muhsin Al Saud (divorced)
Names
- Lolowah bint Faisal bin Abdulaziz Al Saud
- House: Al Saud
- Father: King Faisal
- Mother: Iffat Al Thunayan

Lolowah bint Faisal Al Saud (also spelled Loulwa; Arabic: لولوة بنت الفيصل آل سعود, romanized: Lūluwah Al Fayṣal Āl Suʿūd; born 1948) is a daughter of King Faisal of Saudi Arabia and Iffat Al Thunayan. She is considered one of the most publicly visible female members of the Saudi royal family. She is a prominent activist for women's education and other social issues in Saudi Arabia.

== Biography ==
Lolowah bint Faisal was one of nine children of King Faisal and Iffat Al Thunayan. Her mother, Iffat, was born to a Turkish family. She was brought up in a palace in Ta’if. Like Faisal's other children, she was educated abroad, and attended high school in Lausanne, Switzerland. She married one of her cousins, Saud bin Abdul Muhsin, with whom she had three children, but divorced after ten years.

Princess Lolowah's cousin, Faisal bin Musaid, assassinated her father in March 1975, when Lolowah was 27.

=== Women's issues ===
Princess Lolowah has dedicated her life to improving the welfare of women in Saudi Arabia, especially in the field of education. She has been a member of the Al Nahdah Philanthropic Society for Women in Riyadh since 1970. From 1990 to 1999, she assisted her mother, Queen Iffat in supervising the Dar Al Hanan School in Jeddah, the first private female high school in Saudi Arabia. Along with her mother and siblings, she helped found Effat College (now Effat University) in 1999.

Lolowah was involved in all the phases of the college's founding, from raising funds, developing the curriculum, overseeing construction to the hiring of faculty and staff. She serves as the university's vice chair of the Board of Founders and Board of Trustees, and general supervisor. She allowed herself to be photographed by Western media for the first time in 2005.

During a public session at the 2007 World Economic Forum, Lolowah spoke out against the ban on driving for women in Saudi Arabia. In addition to advocating more rights for Saudi women, she also works against misconceptions about women in Saudi Arabia that exist in the West. She insists Muslim women are accorded equal rights but not necessarily the same rights as men.

=== Representing Saudi Arabia ===
Princess Lolowah has also represented Saudi Arabia at various international forums. She served as a member of the Committee of International Trade of the Saudi Chambers of Commerce and Industries. In 2006, she led a delegation of Saudi businesswomen to Hong Kong. She has participated in Saudi trade missions abroad, accompanying senior Saudi royal family members on diplomatic travels.

Lolowah has given many speeches worldwide on the advancement of Muslim women. She is a member of the summit agenda of the World Economic Forum and participated in the forum's sessions. During the 2008 World Economic Forum Annual Meeting in Davos, she presented the working session "What Kind of Education for What Kind of World?", delivering a speech focusing on the philosophy of education. She was the keynote speaker at the London Middle East Institute Conference at the School of Oriental and African Studies, London in 2003. At home, she is a board member of the King Faisal Foundation.

Like her father King Faisal, Princess Lolowah speaks fluent English and French in addition to her native Arabic.

== Honours ==
In 2009, Princess Lolowah received an honorary degree from Mount Holyoke College, Massachusetts. She also spoke at the commencement ceremony. Mount Holyoke College played a consultative role in the founding of Effat University. She later received honorary doctorates from Tokai University, Japan, in 2011, for her role in promoting women in science and technology and from the University of Salford, UK, in 2013, for her dedication to women's welfare and contributions to education in Saudi Arabia.
