= Etihad Atheeb Telecom =

South Arabian fixed-line operator

Etihad Atheeb Telecommunications Co. (Arabic: شركة اتحاد عذيب للاتصالات), trading as GO (Arabic: جو), is the second fixed-line operator to acquire a license from the Communications and Information Technology Commission (CITC) to provide fixed services including voice and broadband services based in Saudi Arabia.

== Background ==
Etihad Atheeb Telecom was established in 2008 as a Saudi joint stock company, the company's major shareholders are Atheeb Trading Company (16.1%), Batelco (15.0%), Al-Nahla Trading Company (13.7%), and Traco Trading Ltd Co. (5.8%).

Other founding shareholders include Saudi Internet Ltd Co., Atheeb Ltd. Co. for Computer and Communication, and Atheeb Maintenance and Service.

=== Board of directors ===
Board Member	Position
Abdulaziz bin Ahmed Al Saud	Chairman
Shaikh Mohamed Bin Isa AlKhalifa	Board member
Mohamed Wajjih Bin Hasan Shurbatli	Board member
Peter Kaliaropoulos	Board member
Javed Akhter	Board member
Saad bin Omer Albaiz	Board member and secretary
Sultan bin Khalid AlTurki	Board member
Abdulaziz Bin Abdullatif Aljazzer	Board member
Husam Hashem Sadagah	Board member
Raed Kayyal	Board member and former acting chief executive officer
Abdulrahman Bin Abdulaziz Mutrib	Board member

=== Management team ===
On June 13, 2010, Etihad Atheeb Telecom board of directors announced the appointment of Raed Kayyal as acting chief executive officer on to replace former chief executive officer Ahmed Abbas Sindi.

Management team as of June 13, 2010
Name	Position
Zaid Al Shabanat	Chief executive officer
Suliman Al Zahrabi	Deputy CEO and chief commercial officer
Abdulrahman Mutrib	Acting vice president, Human Resources & Administration
Ameen Myrchant	Chief financial officer

== Founding and IPO ==
Etihad Atheeb Telecom was one of ten applicants to bid for a public fixed services license on March 10, 2007, The Communications and Information Technology Commission (CITC) approved the list of eligible applicants for fixed services licenses on April 15, 2007, which included Etihad Atheeb Telecom and two other operators. Following the license announcement, Etihad Atheeb Telecom acquired a 3.5 GHz frequency spectrum covering thirteen regional divisions across Saudi Arabia valued at over 500 million riyals (US$138 million).

On February 25, 2008, the Council of Ministers approved the establishment of Etihad Atheeb Telecom as a Saudi joint stock company with an authorized capital of 1 billion riyals (US$266 million). As a condition of the approval, Etihad Atheeb Telecom would offer at least 25% of its shares in an initial public offering (IPO).

In January 2009, Etihad Atheeb Telecom announced an IPO of 30% of the company's shares with a total value of 300 million riyals, at a price of 10 riyals per share. Etihad Atheeb Telecom IPO marked the first IPO in Saudi Arabia since all new offerings had been halted in August 2008 in the midst of unfavorable market conditions as a result of the global economic crisis.

The announcement was made by Prince Abdul Aziz bin Ahmed bin Abdul Aziz where he stated:

With the launch of the new IPO, A new chapter begins in the history of telecommunications in the Kingdom of Saudi Arabia, the introduction of new fixed lines would pave the way for the kingdom’s economy to shift to a new knowledge based economy. Etihad Atheeb Telecom is a Saudi joint stock company operation in the Saudi market with a strong financial solvency and targeting local beneficiaries, our policy is in line with recommendations of the First Arab Economic summit, which call for the liberalization of the telecom sector, and the private sector’s engagement in the development process.

The IPO closed successfully on February 2, 2009, with coverage in excess to (350%), the company's IPO had been significantly oversubscribed, and analysts interpreted the oversubscription as a positive indicator of confidence in the IPO market of Saudi Arabia.

== Commercial launch ==
On March 18, 2008, Etihad Atheeb Telecom announced a $165 million WiMAX 802.16e infrastructure contract with Motorola, The contract included construction of the first phase of infrastructure with a comprehensive service package including end-to-end delivery of network planning, installation, optimization and support services, Etihad Atheeb Telecom also contracted with each of ZTE and Wipro.

Prince Abdul Aziz bin Ahmed bin Abdul Aziz, was elected chairman of the board of directors and the company launched its commercial trademark “GO” (Arabic: جو) on February 18, 2009, in a large ceremony held in Riyadh.

Later in March 2009, Etihad Atheeb Telecom commenced the trial phase of its WiMAX network.

Early registration campaign

Etihad Atheeb Telecom received the official approval from the Communications and Information Technology Commission (CITC) for its license on April 5, 2009. Following the license, GO announced its “early registration campaign” in Riyadh and Jeddah, the early registration campaign continued for two months prior to the official launch.

Commercial service launch and expansion

On June 6, 2009, Etihad Atheeb Telecom held a press conference to where the company announced the commercial launch of its WiMAX Broadband internet services, covering Riyadh.

Etihad Atheeb Telecom also announced a US$48 million contract with China ZTE Corporation. Under the agreement ZTE will help GO construct a high-speed WiMAX network covering five major cities in Saudi Arabia, including the eastern region.

By August 2009, GO had expanded its WiMAX network coverage to cover fully Jeddah and Medina, Followed by Mecca in September. By the end of 2009 Etihad Atheeb Telecom had fully covered the western region of the kingdom of Saudi Arabia with its WiMAX network.

In January 2010, GO announced the official launch of its services in Dammam and Khobar, followed by an expansion to include Hofuf and Qatif, thus fully covering the eastern region by the end of January.

In total, GO covers eleven cities with its WiMAX network.

== Voice service ==
On November 15, 2009, the company announced the launch of its nomadic voice services, formally marking the end of Saudi Telecom's landline monopoly in the kingdom of Saudi Arabia.

GO is the first operator to offer nomadic voice services over WiMAX in the region.

== Products and services ==
GO provides broadband Internet services over WiMAX, advanced fixed line VoIP services and fax services.
