= Turki bin Muqrin Al Saud =

Saudi royal (born 1973)

- Born: 1973 (age 52–53)
Names
- Turki bin Muqrin bin Abdulaziz Al Saud
- House: Saud
- Father: Muqrin bin Abdulaziz
- Mother: Abta bint Hamoud Al Rashid

Turki bin Muqrin Al Saud (Arabic: تركي بن مقرن بن عبدالعزيز آل سعود; born 1973) is a pilot, businessman, the CEO of Rabigh Wings Aviation Academy (RWAA), and a member of the House of Saud, one of the grandsons of Saudi Arabia's founder King Abdulaziz. He also is the president of the Saudi Air Sports Federation.

== Early life ==
Prince Turki was born in 1973 to former Crown Prince Muqrin bin Abdulaziz. He is a nephew of King Salman of Saudi Arabia and one of the grandsons of Saudi's founder King Abdulaziz. He is a brother of Mansour bin Muqrin and Fahd bin Muqrin.

== Career ==
Prince Turki is a licensed helicopter and fixed wing pilot, and a board member of the Saudi Aviation Club. Prince Turki is a founding shareholder of the Arabian Shield Cooperative Insurance Company, holding 2% of the company. Prince Turki founded and owns a real-estate company in Turkey. Before Rabigh Wings Aviation Academy (RWAA), Prince Turki established aviation schools in the United Kingdom and Lebanon. He is also one of the main shareholders of RWAA.

On 27 May 2012, the Royal Jordanian Air Academy (RJAA) signed a Memorandum of Understanding with Rabigh Wings Aviation Academy "to develop cooperation between the two academies and share experiences in the fields of aviation and aircraft maintenance." The MoU was signed by Prince Turki and Director General of RJAA Captain Mohammed Khawaldeh.

Prince Turki began flying helicopters in the UK in 1991, later earning a fixed-wing license in Saudi Arabia. He told the Saudi Gazette that his experience with other aspiring pilots in the Kingdom led him to establish a flying school.

Prince Turki is chairman of the Saudi Development and Training Company.
