= Muhammad bin Saad Al Saud =

Saudi royal and former military and government official (born 1944)

Deputy Governor of Riyadh Province
- In office: November 2011 – 14 February 2013
- Predecessor: Sattam bin Abdulaziz
- Successor: Turki bin Abdullah
- Monarch: King Abdullah
- Born: 1944 (age 81–82); Riyadh
- Spouse: Seeta bint Saud bin Abdulaziz Al Saud
Names
- Muhammad bin Saad bin Abdulaziz Al Saud
- House: Al Saud
- Father: Saad bin Abdulaziz
- Education: Royal Air Force College Cranwell

Muhammad bin Saad Al Saud (Arabic: محمد بن سعد آل سعود; born 1944) is a former deputy governor of Riyadh Province, member of the House of Saud, and one of the grandsons of Saudi Arabia's King Abdulaziz. He has been in detention since March 2020.

== Early life and education ==
Muhammad bin Saad was born in Riyadh in 1944 to Prince Saad, the seventh son of King Abdulaziz. Prince Saad was not given a significant political position due to his weak and negligible character like his half-brother Prince Bandar.

After completing his secondary education in Riyadh, Prince Muhammad went to the United Kingdom to join the Royal Air Force College Cranwell in 1962 and received training as a pilot, graduating with a bachelor's degree in military science and aviation. He also attended an advanced flight course, a combat aviation course and then, a fighter interceptor course in the United Kingdom.

== Career and other positions ==
Muhammad bin Saad has both military experience and governmental experience. He began his career as a military officer and served in different branches of the Saudi air force. He was first appointed to the sixth squadron at Khamis Musheet base for lightning aircraft. He, then, served at the Dhahran air base, and his military career lasted until 1975.

From 1984 to 1992, Muhammad bin Saad served as the deputy governor of Al Qassim Province. Then, he was appointed advisor to Prince Nayef bin Abdulaziz, interior minister, in 1992. When Prince Nayef was appointed second deputy prime minister in 2009, Prince Muhammad was appointed his advisor. His tenure lasted until 2011, when he was made deputy governor of the Riyadh Province at the rank of minister. He was relieved of his duty on his request on 14 February 2013 and replaced by Turki bin Abdullah as deputy governor.

=== Other positions ===
Prince Muhammad was one of the founders of the Dar Al Maal Al Islami Trust which was initiated by Mohammed bin Faisal Al Saud, King Faisal's son, in 1981. He is a member of the Allegiance Council which was established in 2007.

== Personal life ==
His spouse is Seeta bint Saud, a daughter of King Saud.

=== Views and arrest ===
Muhammad bin Saad is one of three members of the Allegiance Council who did not support the appointment of Mohammad bin Salman as crown prince on 21 June 2017. The others were Ahmed bin Abdulaziz Al Saud and Abdulaziz bin Abdullah Al Saud. The latter represented his older brother, Khalid bin Abdullah, at the meeting of the council. Muhammad bin Saad was arrested in March 2020 together with other members of the royal family and senior figures.
