= Fahd bin Muqrin Al Saud =

Saudi businessman

Names
- Fahd bin Muqrin bin Abdulaziz Al Saud
- House: Saud
- Father: Muqrin bin Abdulaziz
- Mother: Noura bint Ahmed Almuqrin

Fahd bin Muqrin Al Saud (Arabic: فهد بن مقرن) is a Saudi businessperson and member of the House of Saud, a grandson of King Abdulaziz.

== Biography ==
He is the president of "Sons of the Homeland," a Saudi national initiative "led by 50 intellectuals, scientists and business leaders in the Kingdom" to "prepare youth to serve the nation and contribute toward the homeland's security". He is also the president of the Saudi National Environmental Education Initiative.

Fahd is the son of former Crown Prince Muqrin bin Abdul-Aziz and Noura bint Ahmed Almuqrin, and a brother of Prince Turki bin Muqrin bin Abdulaziz and Prince Mansour bin Muqrin.

His son, Faisal bin Fahd, has been deputy governor of Hail since 2018.
