= Mansour bin Muqrin Al Saud =

Saudi royal, businessman and government official (1974–2017)

Advisor at Crown Prince Court
- In office: 22 April 2015 – 5 November 2017
- Monarch: King Salman

Deputy Governor of Asir
- In office: 2013 – 5 November 2017
- Monarch: King Abdullah; King Salman
- Born: 1974
- Died: 5 November 2017 (aged 42–43)
Names
- Mansour bin Muqrin bin Abdulaziz bin Abdul Rahman bin Faisal bin Turki bin Abdullah bin Muhammad bin Saud
- House: Al Saud
- Father: Muqrin bin Abdulaziz
- Mother: Abtah bint Hamoud Al Rashid

Mansour bin Muqrin Al Saud (1974 – 5 November 2017; Arabic: منصور بن مقرن بن عبد العزيز آل سعود) was a Saudi businessman, member of the House of Saud, and advisor at the Court of the Crown Prince of Saudi Arabia. In April 2015, he was appointed advisor to the Custodian of the Two Holy Mosques with the rank of minister. He was the son of Prince Muqrin, former Crown Prince of Saudi Arabia. He was one of the grandsons of Saudi Arabia's founder King Abdulaziz. He was killed in mysterious circumstances when his helicopter crashed near the country's border with Yemen on 5 November 2017, hours after a major purge of the kingdom's political and business leadership.

== Family ==
Mansour was the second youngest son of Prince Muqrin and Abta bint Hamoud Al Rashid, and a full brother of Turki bin Muqrin, Faisal bin Muqrin and Bandar bin Muqrin, half brother of Fahd bin Muqrin. In 2009, Mansour married a daughter of his first cousin Prince Saud bin Fahd Al Saud.

== Career ==
In 2013, Mansour bin Muqrin was named deputy governor of 'Asir Region which he held until his death in 2017. In January 2015, King Salman accepted Crown Prince Muqrin's recommendation that Mansour be made advisor at the Court of the Crown Prince.

He was a partner in Ethan Allen's Saudi franchise. Mansour was vice chairman of Al Bayan Foundation, which builds colleges of higher education in Saudi Arabia.

== Death ==
Mansour bin Muqrin died in a helicopter crash near Abha, near the border with Yemen, along with seven other officials while returning from an inspection tour, according to the Interior Ministry. It did not give a cause for the crash. His brother Faisal in a statement to Saudi newspaper Okaz denied reports that Mansour's death was suspicious. In October 2018, Middle East Eye claimed that Mansour was killed by the Tiger Squad, and that he had fled the 2017 Saudi Arabian purge which began on 4 November 2017.
