= Faisal bin Musaid Al Saud =

Saudi prince and assassin of King Faisal (1944–1975)

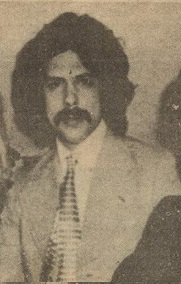
- Pictured in January 1975, two months before the assassination of King Faisal
- Born: 4 April 1944; Saudi Arabia
- Died: 18 June 1975 (aged 31); Deera Square, Riyadh, Saudi Arabia
Names
- Faisal bin Musaid bin Abdulaziz
- House: Al Saud
- Father: Musa'id bin Abdulaziz Al Saud
- Mother: Watfa bint Muhammad bin Talal Al Rashid
- Criminal information
- Known for: Assassination of King Faisal
- Conviction: Murder
- Penalty: Execution

Faisal bin Musaid Al Saud (Note: Arabic: فيصل بن مساعد آل سعود, romanized: Fayṣal bin Musāʿid ʾĀl Suʿūd) (4 April 1944 – 18 June 1975) was the assassin and nephew of King Faisal of Saudi Arabia and a grandson of Saudi Arabia's founder King Abdulaziz. He shot and killed King Faisal in March 1975 and was executed by beheading in June that year.

== Early life ==
Faisal bin Musa'id was born in 1944. His father was Prince Musa'id bin Abdulaziz, son of the founder of Saudi Arabia and half-brother to all the six Saudi kings, including King Faisal, who have succeeded the founder. Faisal bin Musa'id's mother was Watfa, a daughter of Muhammad bin Talāl, the 12th and last Rashidi emir. Musa'id and Watfa were divorced when Faisal was still young. Therefore, he and his siblings were much closer to their maternal Rashidi relatives than to their paternal Al Saud relatives.

In 1965, Faisal's older brother Khaled was shot and killed by a Saudi police officer while he led an assault on a new television station in Riyadh that had been recently founded by King Faisal. Some people opposed the establishment of a national television service, as they considered it immoral to produce images of humans. While that is the official version, the details of his death are disputed and some reports allege that he actually died resisting arrest outside his own home. Regardless, no investigation into his death was ever initiated. Faisal had two other full siblings, Prince Bandar and Princess Al Jawhara. Saudi businessman Abdul Rahman bin Musa'id Al Saud is his half-brother.

== Education ==
Faisal arrived in the United States in 1966 and attended San Francisco State College for two semesters studying English. Allis Bens, director of the American Language Institute at San Francisco State, said, "He was friendly and polite and very well brought up, it seemed to me." While Faisal was at San Francisco State, his brother Khaled was killed. After leaving San Francisco State College, Faisal went to the University of California, Berkeley and then to the University of Colorado Boulder. He was described by his peers as "[a] quiet, likable, notably unstudious young man". University of Colorado Professor Edward Rozek, who had taught him in three comparative government courses, described him as "academically a D and a C student".

In 1969, while in Boulder, he was arrested for conspiring to sell LSD. He pleaded guilty and was placed on probation for one year. In May 1970, the district attorney dropped the charges.

In 1971, he received a bachelor's degree in political science from the University of Colorado and then returned to the San Francisco Bay area. At the University of California, Berkeley, he enrolled in graduate courses in political science, but did not receive a master's degree.

== After the United States ==
After leaving the United States, he went to Beirut. For unknown reasons, he also went to East Germany. When he came back to Saudi Arabia, Saudi authorities seized his passport because of his troubles abroad. He began teaching at Riyadh University and kept in touch with his girlfriend, Christine Surma, who was 26 at the time of the assassination.

== Assassination and trial ==
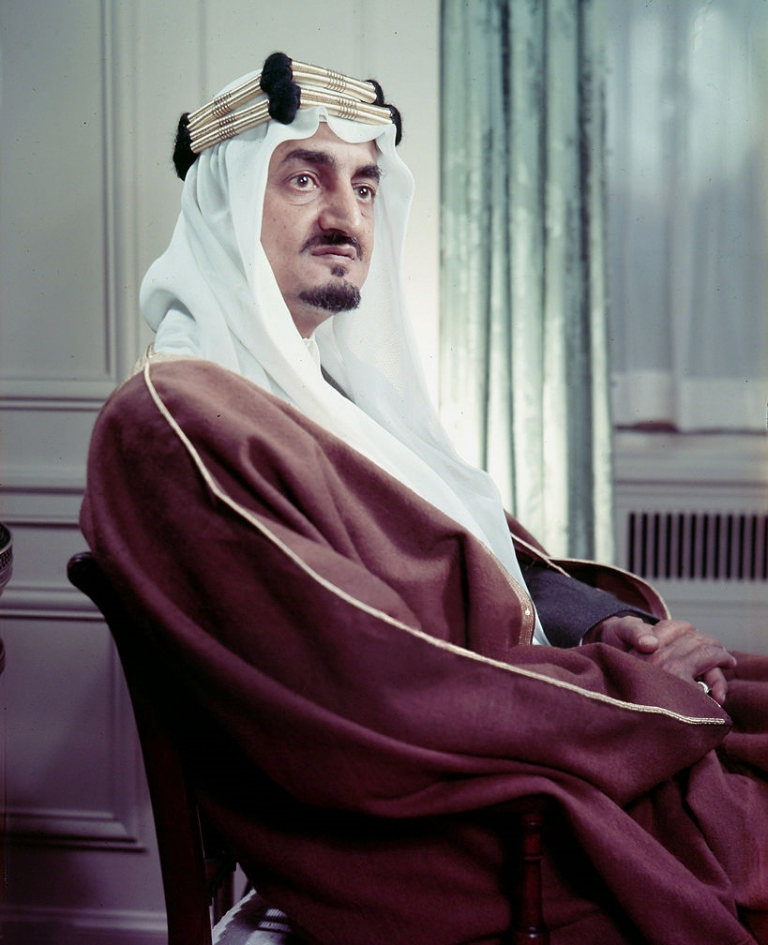
King Faisal bin Abdulaziz

=== Royal Palace shooting ===
On 25 March 1975, Prince Faisal went to the Royal Palace in Riyadh, where King Faisal was holding a meeting, known as a majlis. He joined a Kuwaiti delegation and lined up to meet the king. The king recognized his nephew and bent his head forward, so that the younger Faisal could kiss the king's head in a sign of respect. The prince took out a revolver from his robe and shot the King twice in the head. His third shot missed and he threw the gun away. King Faisal fell to the floor. Bodyguards with swords and submachine guns arrested the prince. The king was rushed to a hospital but doctors were unable to save him. Saudi television crews captured the entire assassination on camera.

=== Imprisonment and execution ===
Initial reports described Faisal bin Musaid as "mentally deranged". He was moved to a Riyadh prison. However, he was later deemed sane to be tried.

A sharia court found Faisal guilty of the king's murder on 18 June, and his public execution occurred hours later. Cars with loudspeakers drove around Riyadh publicly announcing the verdict and his imminent execution, and crowds gathered in the square. Faisal was led by a soldier to the execution point and was reported to have walked unsteadily. Wearing white robes and blindfolded, Faisal was beheaded with a single sweep of a gold-handled sword.

=== Motives ===
Aside from the death of his brother, his other possible motivations remain unknown, but other motives have been proposed. Saudi officials began to state that the prince's actions were deliberate and planned. Rumours suggested that the prince had told his mother about his assassination plans, who in turn told King Faisal who responded that "if it is Allah's will, then it would happen".

Arab media implied that the prince had been an agent of the U.S. Central Intelligence Agency and Israel's Mossad. Following such claims, a theory started in Iranian media mentioned that he might have been manipulated by his Western girlfriend (Christine Surma) who, it was alleged, might have been Jewish and secretly an asset for the Israeli intelligence services. The rumour was briefly taken seriously by Saudi Arabian officials who informally contacted Surma to question her regarding the assassination, at which point she revealed she was not Jewish and was as puzzled as everyone else regarding the actions of Faisal.

Beirut newspapers offered three different explanations for the attack. An-Nahar reported that the attack may have been possible vengeance for the dethroning of King Saud, because Faisal was scheduled to marry Saud's daughter, Princess Sita, in the same week. An-Nahar also reported that King Faisal had ignored his repeated complaints that his $3,500 monthly allowance ($16,700/month in 2020 dollars, $200,500/year) was insufficient and this may have prompted the assassination. Al Bayrak reported that according to reliable Saudi sources, King Faisal prohibited him from leaving the country because of his excessive consumption of alcohol and other drugs and the attack may have been a retaliation against the travel ban.
