= Naif (name) =

Naif is a masculine given name of Arabic origin. It is a variant transliteration of the name Nayef. Notable people with the name include:

== Given name ==
- Naif Almas (born 2000), Saudi footballer
- Naif Almasrahi (born 1990), Saudi para athlete
- Naif Saleh Alrajhi, Saudi entrepreneur, investor, philanthropist, and businessman
- Naif Al-Balawi (born 1986), Saudi footballer
- Naif Gahani (born 1968), Saudi poet and writer
- Naif Al-Hadhrami (born 2001), Qatari footballer
- Naif Hazazi (footballer, born 1988), Saudi footballer
- Naif Hazazi (footballer, born 1992), Saudi footballer
- Naif Mohammed Jasim, Iraqi politician
- Naif Kariri (born 1998), Saudi footballer
- Naif Masoud (born 2001), Saudi footballer
- Naif Al-Mousa (born 1986), Saudi footballer
- Naif Mubarak (born 1990), Qatari footballer
- Naif Al-Qadi (born 1979), Saudi Arabian footballer
- Naif Abu-Sharah (1966–2004), Palestinian militant

== Surname ==
- Abdul Razzaq an-Naif (1933–1978), Iraqi politician
- Alejandro Naif (born 1973), Palestinian footballer
- Hareth Al Naif (born 1993), Syrian footballer

== Fictional characters ==
- Naif al-Sheikh, a spy and superhero in the DC Universe
