= Faisal bin Turki I Al Saud =

Saudi royal and politician (1918–1968)

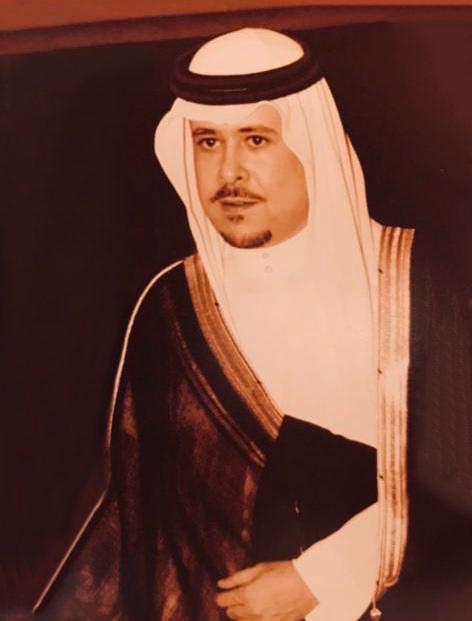

Minister of Interior
- In office: 1961–1962
- Monarch: Saud
- Prime Minister: King Saud
- Predecessor: Abdul Muhsin bin Abdulaziz
- Successor: Fahd bin Abdulaziz
- Born: 1918; Riyadh, Saudi Arabia
- Died: 29 November 1968 (aged 49–50); Riyadh, Saudi Arabia
- Spouse: List: Munira bint Abdulaziz Al Oqla; Buniah bint Musl'am Al Subaie; Tefla bint Abdullah Al Khrassan Al Ajmi; Jawza bint Mohammed Al Waj'an Al Shammari; Hassa bint Saud Al Saud; Amoosha bint Obaid Al Rasheed
- Issue: List: Princess Al Jawhara; Princess Sara; Prince Turki; Prince Abdullah; Prince Fahd; Prince Khalid; Princess Seetah; Prince Abdulaziz; Princess Mashael; Prince Mohammed
Names
- Faisal bin Turki I bin Abdulaziz
- House: Al Saud
- Father: Turki I bin Abdulaziz Al Saud
- Mother: Nora bint Obaid Al Rasheed

Faisal bin Turki I Al Saud (Arabic: فيصل بن تركي الأول آل سعود, romanized: Fayṣal bin Turkī al-ʾAwwal ʾĀl Suʿūd; 1918 – 29 November 1968) was a Saudi royal and politician. He was the only son of Prince Turki I and the eldest grandson of Saudi's founder King Abdulaziz. He served as minister of interior during the reign of King Saud, his uncle, step-father and father-in-law, and was the country's first minister of labour and social affairs. Although he was very close to King Saud, Prince Faisal was one of the Saudi royals who signed the document that asked Saud to abdicate in 1964.

== Early life and family ==
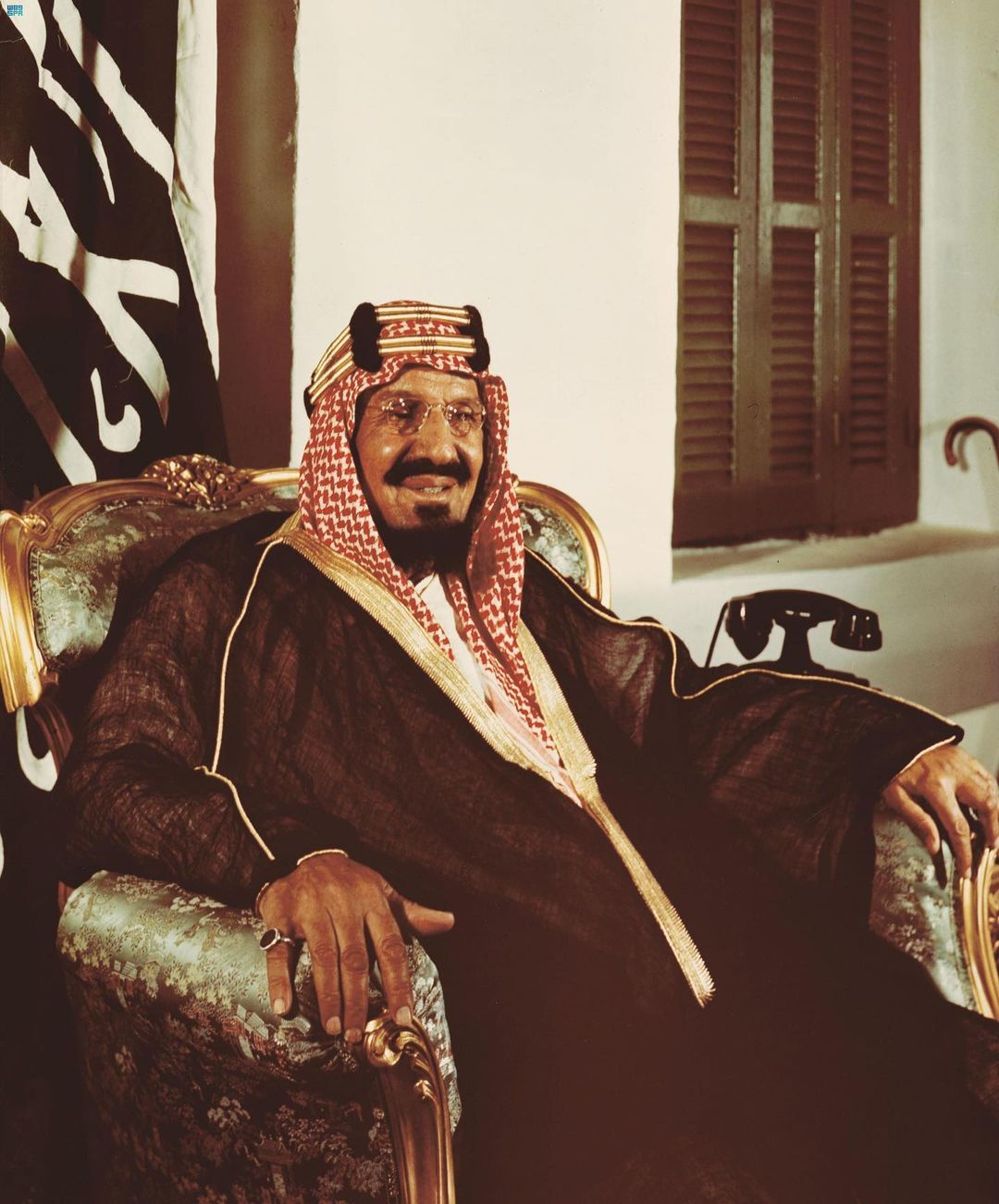
King Abdulaziz, grandfather of Faisal

Prince Faisal was born in Riyadh in 1918. He was the only son of Prince Turki I, and his mother was Nora bint Obaid Al Rasheed. Faisal's father was the eldest son of Abdulaziz, then Sultan of Nejd. Prince Turki died from Spanish flu in late 1919, a few months before Prince Faisal was born. After Prince Turki died, Princess Nora remarried to her husband's brother Prince Saud (later King of Saudi Arabia). Prince Faisal had at least two half-sisters: Princess Hessa bint Turki on his father's side and Princess Al Anoud bint Saud, the daughter of Princess Nora and King Saud.

== Career ==
Prince Faisal held several posts in the government, most of which were during the reign of King Saud. Shortly after the unification of the Kingdom, King Abdulaziz appointed him as Prince of Al Khafji, a small village. He was the first Prince for the town after the establishment of Saudi Arabia. In June 1961, King Saud appointed him the minister of labour and social affairs which he held between 1961 and 1962. In September 1961, he became minister of interior, succeeding Prince Abdul Muhsin bin Abdulaziz, and remained in this position until 31 October 1962. Then he was named an advisor at the ministry of petroleum and mineral resources.

== Personal life ==
=== Wives ===
- Munira bint Abdulaziz Al Oqla
- Buniah bint Musl'am bin Harqan Al Subaie
- Tefla bint Abdullah Al Khrassan Al Ajmi
- Jawza bint Mohammed bin Thamir Al Waj'an Al Shammari
- Hassa bint Saud bin Abdulaziz Al Saud
- Amoosha bint Obaid bin Abdullah Rasheed

=== Children ===
- Al Jawhara bint Faisal bin Turki
- Sara bint Faisal bin Turki, wife of Prince Mishaal bin Saud Al Saud
- Turki bin Faisal bin Turki (deceased), died overseas at the age of 58, after suffering a heart attack. His wife was Sara bint Saud bin Abdulaziz. His son, Fahd, was named deputy governor of Qasim Province in 2017. And his son Abdulaziz bin Turki bin Faisal al saud
- Abdullah bin Faisal bin Turki (1945– 18 February 2019). His mother was Jawza bint Mohammed bin Thamir Al Waj'an. He married Hassa bint Khalid bin Abdulaziz Al Saud (1950–2010), daughter of King Khalid. Then he married Al Anoud bint Abdulaziz Al Sudairi.
- Fahd bin Faisal bin Turki. He was a major in army special forces.
- Khalid bin Faisal bin Turki. He was a businessman and married to Nouf bint Bandar bin Mohammed bin Abdulaziz Al Saud.
- Seetah bint Faisal bin Turki. She married Faisal bin Abdulaziz bin Faisal Al Saud.
- Abdulaziz bin Faisal bin Turki.
- Mashael bint Faisal bin Turki (died 2016). She married Bandar bin Abdullah bin Mohammed Saud Al Kabeer
- Mohammed bin Faisal bin Turki

== Death ==
Faisal died in Riyadh in 29 November 1968.

Political offices
Preceded by Abdul Muhsin bin Abdulaziz Al Saud	Minister of Interior; 1961–1962	Succeeded by Fahd bin Abdulaziz Al Saud
