= Saud bin Abdulmohsen Al Saud =

Saudi royal and diplomat

Saud bin Abdulmohsen bin Abdulaziz Al Saud

Saudi Arabian Ambassador to Portugal
- In office 25 March 2021 – present
- Monarch: Salman
- Preceded by: Adel bin Abdulrahman Bakhsh

7th Governor of Hail Province
- In office 29 November 1999 – 22 April 2017
- Appointed by: King Fahd
- Monarchs: Fahd; Abdullah; Salman
- Preceded by: Muqrin bin Abdulaziz
- Succeeded by: Abdulaziz bin Saad

Personal details
- Born: 1947 (age 78–79) Riyadh, Saudi Arabia
- Spouse(s): Princess Hala; Princess Assia; Princess Bonaiah; Princess Lolowah bint Faisal (divorced)
- Parents: Abdulmohsen bin Abdulaziz (father); Wadha bint Hamoud (mother)
- Education: Royal Military Academy Sandhurst
- Occupation: Diplomat; Politician
- Awards: Order of Loyalty to the Crown of Malaysia

Saud bin Abdulmohsen Al Saud (Arabic: سعود بن عبد المحسن بن عبد العزيز آل سعود; born 1947) is a Saudi Arabian royal, diplomat, and politician. A grandson of King Abdulaziz, he served as the 7th governor of Hail Province from 1999 until 2017. After a brief period away from public office, he was appointed in 2021 as Saudi Arabia’s ambassador to Portugal.

== Early life and education ==
Saud was born in 1947. He is the eldest son of Abdulmohsen bin Abdulaziz who was interior minister in King Saud's cabinet in 1961. Prince Abdul Muhsin was part of the Free Princes Movement, led by Prince Talal.

Prince Saud attended the Royal Military Academy in Sandhurst. He also holds a degree in business administration.

== Career ==
Saud held several government positions beginning as the director of health and housing department in the ministry of health from 1970 to 1973. Other positions he held include director general in the ministry of health from 1973 to 1976; deputy governor of Mecca Province from 1976 to 1992 and acting governor of Mecca Province from 1992 to 1999. He was also president of the Supreme Commission for Hail Development and head of the Supreme Commission of the Hail Rally. He is a member of the Allegiance Council.

Saud's term as the governor of Hail Province ended on 22 April 2017 when Abdulaziz bin Saad was named as the new governor. In 25 March 2021 King Salman appointed him ambassador to Portugal. He replaced Adel bin Abdulrahman Bakhsh who had been in the post since January 2017.

== Personal life ==
Saud has been married four times. He is married to Hala al Sheikh. His marriage to Lolowah bint Faisal was an attempt to strengthen the bonds between his father Prince Abdul Muhsin and the Al Saud family due to his involvement in Free Princes Movement.

He enjoys traditional Bedouin customs of falconry, as well as western sports including tennis.

=== Marriages ===
- Princess Lolowah bint Faisal Al Saud (divorced)
- Princess Bonaiah bint Fahd bin Abdullah bin Abdul Rahman Al Saud (daughter of Princess Mishael bint Abdulaziz)
- Princess Hala bint Abdullah bin Abdul Rahman Al Sheikh
- Princess Assia bint Abduljalil bin Mohamed (Moroccan wife)

=== BBC documentary ===
In 2008, Saud was the subject of a BBC documentary about modern Saudi Arabia, Inside the Saudi Kingdom, in which a film crew led by Lionel Mill was given unique access to follow the prince for a month in his daily work. He concluded that the Western world needed to learn that "you can only change people as much as they want to be changed and we do not want to be Westernized."

=== Cyprus visa ===
Following his removal from the post as the governor of Hail province, Saud applied for golden visa issued by Cyprus in December 2017. In May 2020 his application was approved.

== Honour ==
=== Foreign honour ===
- Honorary Commander of the Order of Loyalty to the Crown of Malaysia (P.S.M.) (1982)
