= 2017 United Arab Emirates Air Force crash =

Aviation accident in Yemen

2017 United Arab Emirates Air Force Sikorsky UH-60M Black Hawk crash
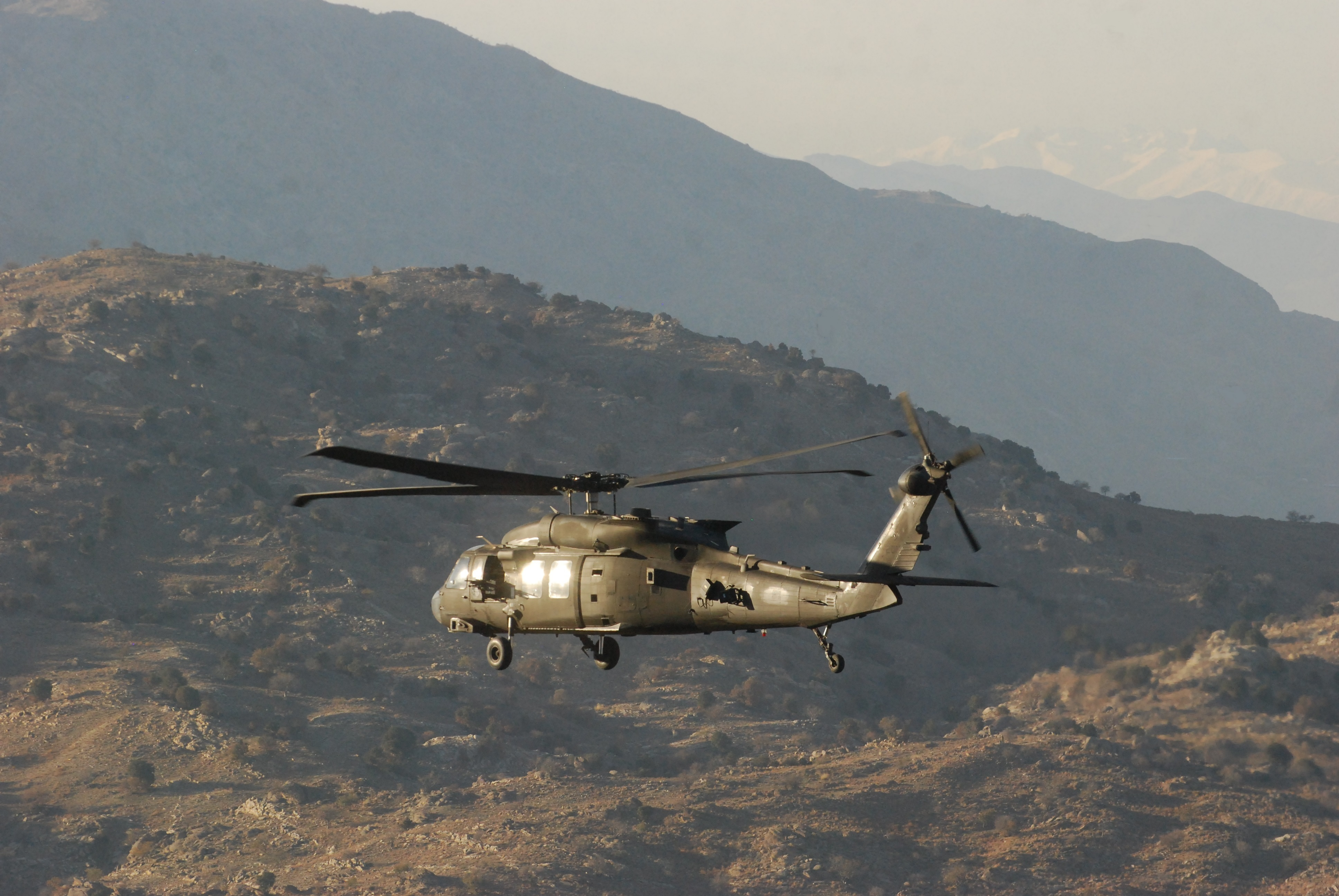
- A Sikorsky UH-60M Black Hawk helicopter, similar to the helicopter involved in the crash

Accident
- Date: 11 August 2017
- Summary: technical malfunction
- Site: Shabwa Governorate, Yemen

Aircraft
- Aircraft type: Sikorsky UH-60M Black Hawk
- Operator: United Arab Emirates Air Force
- Occupants: 11
- Fatalities: 4
- Survivors: 7

On 11 August 2017, a Sikorsky UH-60M Black Hawk helicopter operated by the United Arab Emirates Air Force crashed while on a mission in Shabwa, Yemen during the Saudi-led intervention in the Yemeni civil war, killing four of the soldiers on board. According to the Emirates News Agency, the crash was due to a technical malfunction.

Seven soldiers survived the crash, including a member of the royal Al Nahyan family. Emirati officials asked for help rescuing the survivors from Major General Miguel Correa, then the defense attaché at the United States Embassy in Abu Dhabi, which resulted in sending American special forces on two Ospreys for a rescue mission. The American medical team flew the seven injured soldiers to the USS Bataan in Gulf of Aden. After 48 hours, they were sent to an airport in Yemen, where they boarded an Air Force C-17 cargo plane destined for Landstuhl Regional Medical Center, Germany.
