= Nayef Al-Daihani =

Kuwaiti sports shooter

Personal information
- Nationality: Kuwait
- Born: 21 June 1956 (age 68)

Sport
- Sport: Shooting

Nayef Al-Daihani (born 21 June 1956) is a Kuwaiti sport shooter. He competed in the 1992 Summer Olympics.
