= Abdulmohsen bin Abdulaziz Al Saud =

Saudi royal, government official, and poet (1925–1985)

Governor of Medina Province
- Tenure: 1965 – 1985
- Predecessor: Muhammad bin Abdulaziz Al Saud
- Successor: Abdul Majeed bin Abdulaziz
- Monarch: King Faisal; King Khalid; King Fahd

Minister of Interior
- Tenure: 1960 – 1961
- Predecessor: Musaid bin Abdul Rahman
- Successor: Faisal bin Turki I
- Monarch: King Saud
- Born: 1925; Riyadh, Sultanate of Nejd
- Died: 11 May 1985 (aged 59–60); Riyadh, Saudi Arabia
Names
- Abdul Muhsin bin Abdulaziz bin Abdul Rahman
- House: Al Saud
- Father: King Abdulaziz
- Mother: Al Jawhara bint Saad Al Sudairi

Abdul Muhsin bin Abdulaziz Al Saud (Arabic: عبد المحسن بن عبد العزيز آل سعود 'Abd al-Muḥsin bin 'Abd al-'Azīz Āl Sa'ūd; 1925–11 May 1985) was a member of the House of Saud, the governor of Medina, and one of the leading poets in Saudi Arabia.

== Early life and education ==
Prince Abdul Muhsin was born in Riyadh in 1925. He is the thirteenth son of King Abdulaziz and one of the sons of Al Jawhara bint Saad Sudairi, a member of the Al Sudairi family. She was widow of Saad bin Abdul Rahman, King Abdulaziz's full brother who died in the battle of Kanzan in 1915. Al Jawhara died soon after the birth of Abdul Muhsin. His full brothers included Prince Saad and Prince Musaid.

Prince Abdul Muhsin studied at the school of princes, and memorized the Quran and learned horsemanship, and then completed the history, politics, arts of war.

== Career and activities ==
Abdul Muhsin was interior minister in King Saud's cabinet in 1960. His tenure lasted for only one year, and he joined the Free Princes Movement led by Prince Talal. On 9 November 1962 he defected to the United Arab Republic renouncing his Saudi Arabian citizenship. Immediately after this event he declared that he would work to make Saudi Arabia a free country. Prince Abdul Muhsin and two of his half-brothers, Prince Badr and Prince Fawwaz, and his cousin, Fahd bin Saad, who also defected to the United Arab Republic, returned to Saudi Arabia upon their rehabilitation by King Faisal on 22 January 1964. Upon their return they published a statement acknowledging their mistake in criticizing the Saudi government.

On 27 September 1965 he was made governor of Madinah, a position he held until 1985. During the 1970s he was one of the members of the inner family council which included his half-brothers King Khalid, Prince Mohammed, Crown Prince Fahd, Prince Abdullah, and Prince Sultan and his uncles Prince Ahmed and Prince Musaid.

Prince Abdul Muhsin had a reputation as being relatively liberal. During his governorship, a television station opened and highways were built to help people reach the Prophet's Mosque.

== Personal life ==
Abdul Muhsin married eight times and had 12 children. One of his spouses was Sara bint Ahmed bin Abdul Rahman Al Sudairi. His sons are Saud, Badr and Walid. Prince Saud was the governor of Hail province from 1999 until 2017. His grandson, Abdul Muhsin bin Walid, was arrested at Beirut Airport due to drug smuggling in 2015.

== Death ==
Abdul Muhsin died on 11 May 1985 in King Faisal Hospital in Riyadh, suffering from illness at the age of 60.

== Honour ==
=== Foreign honour ===
- Honorary Commander of the Order of the Defender of the Realm (P.M.N.) (1982)

Political offices
| Preceded by Musaid bin Abdul Rahman | Minister of Interior; 1960–1961 | Succeeded by Faisal bin Turki I bin Abdulaziz |
