= Fahd bin Badr Al Saud =

Saudi royal and politician

Governor of Al Jawf Province
- In office: 2002 – 2018
- Predecessor: Abdul Elah bin Abdulaziz
- Successor: Badr bin Sultan
- Monarch: King Fahd; King Abdullah; King Salman
- Spouse: Sarah bint Abdullah Al Saud
Names
- Fahd bin Badr bin Abdulaziz bin Abdul Rahman bin Faisal Al Saud
- House: Al Saud
- Father: Badr bin Abdulaziz

Fahd bin Badr Al Saud (Arabic: فهد بن بدر عبد العزيز آل سعود) is a Saudi Arabian politician who served as the governor of Al Jawf Province from 2002 to 2018. He is a member of the House of Saud, a grandson of King Abdulaziz, and the son of Prince Badr bin Abdulaziz. Prince Fahd succeeded his uncle Prince Abdul Elah bin Abdulaziz as governor of Al Jawf. He was the deputy governor of the region until 2002 before his appointment as governor. In February 2018, Prince Fahd was appointed an advisor to King Salman.

== Personal life ==
He is married to Princess Sarah bint Abdullah bin Abdulaziz, a daughter of King Abdullah who ruled Saudi Arabia between 2005 and 2015. They have five children.
