= Saudi Aviation Club =

Saudi Aviation Club نادي الطيران السعودي
- Abbreviation: SAC
- Formation: 2000
- Purpose: Aeronautics
- Headquarters: Riyadh
- Location: Saudi Arabia
- Region served: Saudi Arabia
- Founder and Chairman: Sultan bin Salman
- Website: http://www.sac.com.sa

The Saudi Aviation Club (SAC) is official aviation club of the Kingdom of Saudi Arabia.

== History ==
"The Saudi Aviation Club (SAC) was established by resolution 217 of the council of ministers on 4 December 2000 as an independent nonprofit entity to promote aeronautical sciences and to encourage the participation of the public in aviation. SAC’s airport is located in Thumama, approximately 60 km north of Riyadh." Plans for the club were unveiled on January 31, 2007 at the Middle East Business Aviation exhibition by Prince Sultan bin Salman who is the founder and chairman of the SAC. Prince Bandar bin Khalid is a SAC managing director.

The first Arab tournament for Radio-controlled aircraft was sponsored by the SAC and the Arab Union for Sky Sports. The event attracted 40 professionals from eight countries. In response to a directive from Nayef bin Abdulaziz, SAC is "compiling a list of rules for those who practice gliding as a hobby. These will provide safety guidelines and prevent smuggling by restricting the hobby to certain authorized areas."

The Saudi Aviation Club Airfield is located at the Thumamah Airport. "Access to Thumama Airport is only permitted to SAC membership holders." The Saudi Aviation Flight Academy (SAFA) is located at the Saudi Aviation Club. There are "ongoing efforts to transform the Saudi Aviation Club into an association which would act as umbrella for various aviation clubs, pilots, and aviation enthusiasts throughout the Kingdom."

== See also ==
- General Authority of Civil Aviation
- Rabigh Wings Aviation Academy
- Saqr (drone)
