= Abdul Rahman bin Musa'id Al Saud =

Saudi royal and businessman (born 1967)

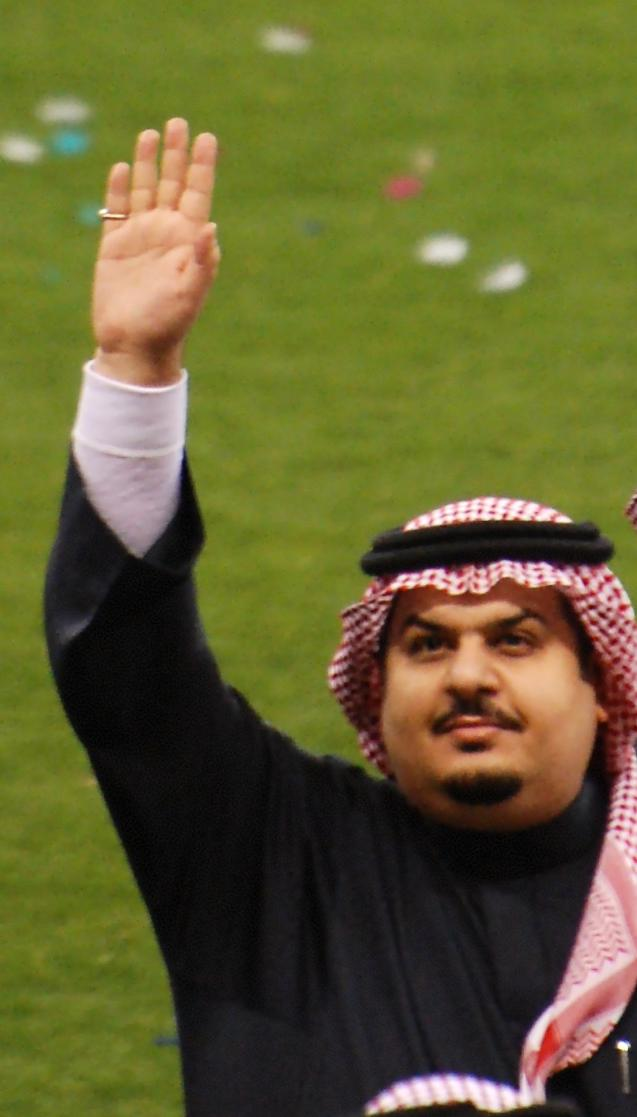
- Prince Abdul Rahman in 2010
- Born: Abdul Rahman bin Musa'id bin Abdulaziz Al Saud; 18 August 1967 (age 58); Paris, France
- House: Al Saud
- Father: Musa'id bin Abdulaziz Al Saud
- Mother: Watfa Al Rasheed
- Occupation: President of Al-Hilal (2008–2015); Executive Chairman

Abdul Rahman bin Musa'id Al Saud (Arabic: عبدالرحمن بن مساعد بن عبد العزيز آل سعود, born 18 August 1967) is a Saudi Arabian businessman, writer and a former president of Saudi football club Al-Hilal. He is a member of the House of Saud, a grandson of King Abdulaziz.

== Biography ==
Prince Abdul Rahman was born in Paris on 18 August 1967 to Prince Musa'id bin Abdulaziz Al Saud. He studied at Paris-Sorbonne University and King Saud University.

Preceded by Mohammed bin Faisal	President of Al-Hilal Club; 2008–2015	Succeeded by Mohammad Al Homaidani
