= Badr bin Abdulaziz Al Saud =

Saudi royal and government official (1932–2013)

Deputy Commander of National Guard
- In office: 1 February 1968 – 2010
- Successor: Abdul Muhsin bin Abdulaziz Al Tuwaijri
- Monarch: Faisal; Khalid; Fahd; Abdullah
- Born: 1932
- Died: 1 April 2013 (aged 80–81); Riyadh, Saudi Arabia
- Burial: 2 April 2013; Al Oud Cemetery, Riyadh
- Spouse: Hessa bint Abdullah Al Sudairi
- Issue: Fahd
Names
- Badr bin Abdulaziz bin Abdul Rahman bin Faisal Al Saud
- House: Al Saud
- Father: King Abdulaziz
- Mother: Haya bint Saad Al Sudairi

Badr bin Abdulaziz Al Saud (Arabic: بدر بن عبد العزيز آل سعود, Badr bin 'Abd al 'Azīz Āl Sa'ūd; 1932 – 1 April 2013) was a long-term deputy commander of the Saudi National Guard and a senior member of the Saudi royal family.

== Early life and education ==
Prince Badr was born in 1932. He was the 20th son of King Abdulaziz. His mother was Haya bint Saad Al Sudairi, who died in Riyadh on 18 April 2003 of unstated causes at the age of 90 and was also buried in the aforementioned city. Prince Badr's full brothers were Prince Abdul Majeed and Prince Abdul Ilah. Prince Badr was educated in Riyadh.

== Free Princes involvement ==
Badr together with Prince Talal and Prince Fawwaz participated in the Free Princes Movement lasting from 1962 to 1964 and lived in exile, mostly in Beirut and Cairo. Prince Badr and two of his half-brothers, Prince Abdul Muhsin and Prince Fawwaz, and his cousin, Fahd bin Saad, who also defected to the United Arab Republic, returned to Saudi Arabia upon their rehabilitation by King Faisal on 22 January 1964. Upon their return they published a statement acknowledging their mistake in criticizing the Saudi government.

== Career ==
King Saud appointed Prince Badr as minister of transport in 1960 and then minister of communications in 1961. His tenure lasted just for one year until his participation to the Free Princes Movement. After his rehabilitation by King Faisal, Prince Badr was appointed deputy commander of Saudi Arabian National Guard (SANG) on 1 February 1968. In addition, he was part of the Saudi delegations in charge of different international missions.

Prince Badr was one of the members of Al Saud Family Council established by Crown Prince Abdullah in June 2000 to discuss private issues such as business activities of princes and marriages of princess to individuals who were not members of the House of Saud.

He supervised the Janadriah, an annual cultural festival held in and around Riyadh. Although King Abdullah supported him, Prince Badr tended to keep a low profile and did not take part in power struggles within the family. As deputy commander of the SANG he was appointed as a member to the newly founded National Security Council in 2005. In addition, he became a member of the allegiance council of Saudi Arabia, which is in charge of succession, when it was formed in 2007.

Prince Badr, the long-serving deputy commander of the SANG, had asked to be relieved from that role due to health concerns in November 2010. Minutes later, the agency announced that his request had been accepted. Abdul Muhsin bin Abdulaziz Al Tuwaijri succeeded Prince Badr as deputy commander of the SANG.

Prince Badr was referred to as an adviser to King Abdullah in United States diplomatic cables.

== Personal life ==
Prince Badr married Hessa bint Abdullah Al Sudairi, daughter of his maternal uncle. They had seven children, four daughters and three sons. His eldest son Fahd is the former governor of Al Jawf Province. Prince Fahd's spouse is Sara bint Abdullah, daughter of King Abdullah and Hessa bint Trad Al Shaalan. One of Prince Badr's daughters, Jawahar, died in June 2014.

Prince Badr is reported to never have had a high public profile. Furthermore, he never exerted a large amount of executive control over the Guard during his tenure, though his influence there cannot be denied.

== Death and funeral ==
Prince Badr died on 1 April 2013 at the age of 81. Funeral prayers for him were held after Asr prayer at Imam Turki bin Abdullah Mosque in Riyadh on 2 April.

== Honour ==
=== Foreign honour ===
- Honorary Commander of the Order of the Defender of the Realm (P.M.N.) (Malaysia; 1982)
