= Haya bint Saad Al Sudairi =

Saudi royal (1913–2003)

- Born: 1913
- Died: 18 April 2003 (aged 89–90); Riyadh, Saudi Arabia
- Burial: Al Oud cemetery, Riyadh
- Spouse: Abdulaziz of Saudi Arabia (m. 1927; died 1953)
- Issue: List: Prince Badr; Prince Abdul Majid; Prince Abdul Illah; Princess Meshail; Princess Hessa
Names
- Haya bint Saad bin Abdul Muhsin Al Sudairi
- House: Al Sudairi (by birth); Al Saud (by marriage)
- Father: Saad bin Abdul Muhsin Al Sudairi

Haya bint Saad Al Sudairi (Arabic: هيا بنت سعد السديري Hayā bint Saʿad Āl Sudayrī; 1913 – 18 April 2003) was one of the spouses of King Abdulaziz of Saudi Arabia. She was a member of the powerful Sudairi family. Her elder sister, Al Jawhara bint Saad, married Abdulaziz and had three sons and a daughter with him. Following the death of Al Jawhara in 1927, Haya married Abdulaziz. Their marriage also produced three sons and two daughters: Princess Hessa, Princess Meshail, Prince Badr, Prince Abdul Majid and Prince Abdul Illah.

On 7 February 1999 as part of the centennial celebrations of Riyadh's capture by King Abdulaziz an interview with Haya bint Saad was published in Al Jazirah, a Saudi Arabian newspaper. She argued "whatever has been and will be said about the King [Abdulaziz] cannot reflect the [whole] truth."

Haya bint Saad died at age 90 in Riyadh on 18 April 2003. She was buried in the Al Oud cemetery there.
