= Rabigh Wings Aviation Academy =

Rabigh Wings Aviation Academy (RWAA) أكاديمية أجنحة رابغ للطيران
- Founder: Turki bin Muqrin
- President: Turki bin Muqrin
- Chief Instructor Pilot: Pete Dascoulias
- Address: 9058 Sanan Ibn Zuhair Street, Al Basateen Dist., Jeddah 23718 - 5242, KSA
- Location: Saudi Arabia
- Website: http://rwaa.com.sa

Rabigh Wings Aviation Academy (RWAA) is the first aviation academy set up in Saudi Arabia.

== History ==
Aside from being the first aviation academy in the country, the academy is a modern flight training school.

The CEO and founder, Turki bin Muqrin bin Abdul-Aziz, is a pilot, businessman, and a member of the House of Saud. Adib Shishakly, a founder of the Syrian National Council, is the Vice CEO. Shishakly, not a pilot, told the Saudi Gazette that he "did all the business side of it from buying the aircraft and delivering them to Rabigh. I also helped structure the maintenance department, the fuel farm, and the marketing and business strategy for the school. We have 15 aircraft: some single engine Cessnas, and single and twin Piper aircraft, as well as two twin engine Seneca Vs."

The academy's first social event was held in 2011 with the Saudi "Street Eagles," a Harley-Davidson club. In 2011, Arab News reported that Rabigh Wings Aviation Academy "is preparing to admit women for training." On May 27, 2012, the Royal Jordanian Air Academy (RJAA) signed a Memorandum of Understanding with Rabigh Wings Aviation Academy (RWAA) "to develop cooperation between the two academies and share experiences in the fields of aviation and aircraft maintenance." The MoU was signed by Turki bin Muqrin bin Abdul-Aziz, and Director General of RJAA Captain Mohammed Khawaldeh.

== See also ==
- General Authority of Civil Aviation
- Amaala International Airport
- Saudi Vision 2030
