= Hamoud bin Abdulaziz Al Saud =

Saudi royal and businessman (1947–1994)

- Born: 1947; Saudi Arabia
- Died: 25 February 1994 (aged 46–47); Saudi Arabia
- Issue: Princess Gada
Names
- Hamoud bin Abdulaziz bin Abdul Rahman bin Faisal bin Turki Al Saud
- House: Al Saud
- Father: King Abdulaziz
- Mother: Fatima Al Yamania

Hamoud bin Abdulaziz Al Saud (Arabic: حمود بن عبد العزيز آل سعود; 1947 – 25 February 1994) was a Saudi royal and businessman. He was reportedly the thirty-sixth and youngest son of the founder of Saudi Arabia, King Abdulaziz.

== Biography ==
Prince Hamoud was born in 1947. He was the only child of Fatima Al Yamania, a concubine hailing from Yemen, and King Abdulaziz. He was the youngest living son of King Abdulaziz for all 47 years of his life: from his birth in 1947 until the birth of his half-brother Jiluwi in 1952, and again from his half-brother's death that year until his death in 1994.

He was a businessman with a trade company named Gada Marketing and Trading based in Jeddah, established in 1978. He had one daughter, Princess Gada. Prince Hamoud died at age 47 on 25 February 1994.
