= Nayef bin Mamdouh Al Saud =

Saudi prince (born 1971)

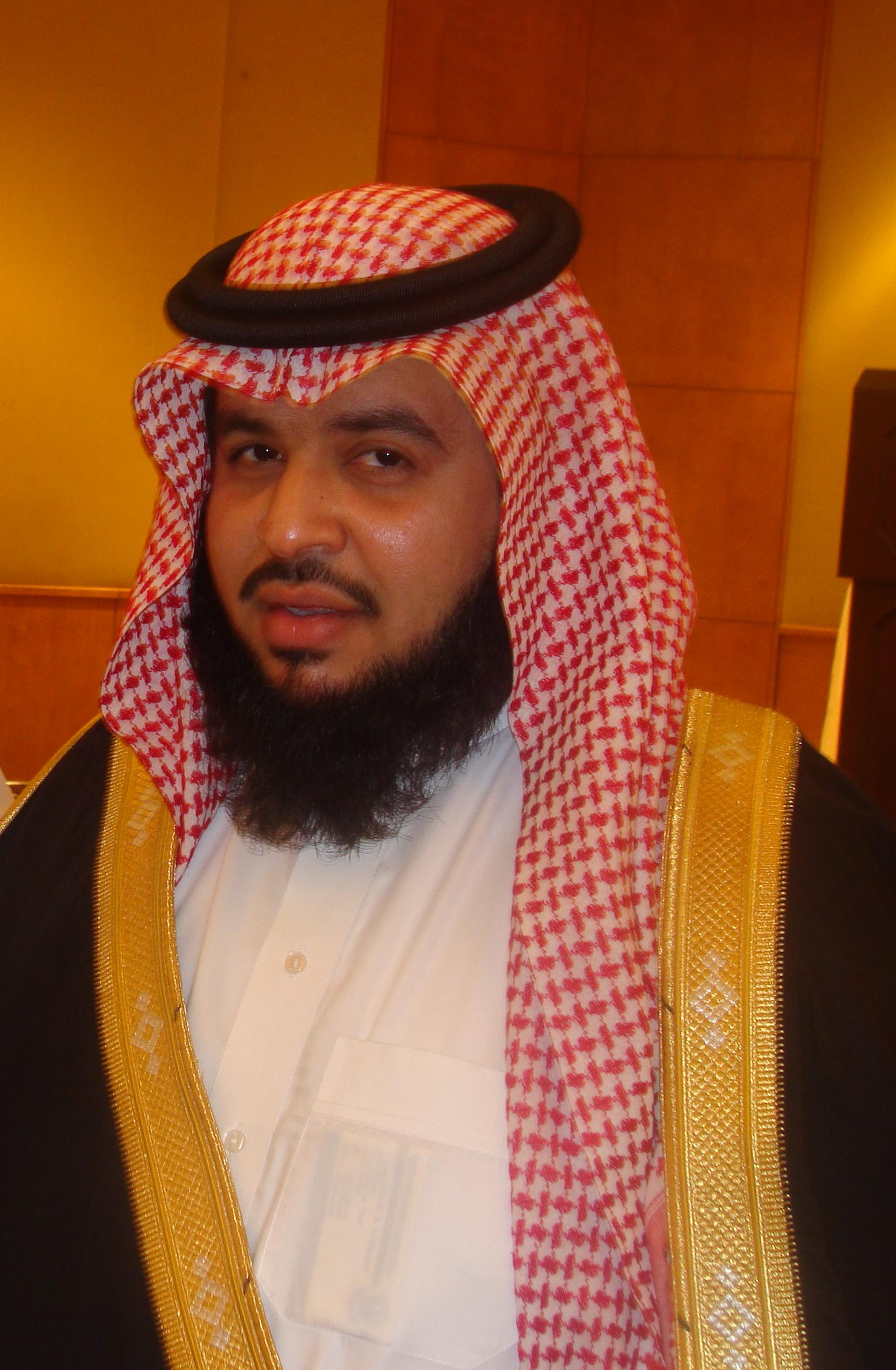
- Born: 1971 (age 54–55); Riyadh
- Issue: Prince Abdullah; Prince Abdul Rahman; Prince Nawaf; Princess Faiza; Princess Sultana; Princess Noura
Names
- Nayef bin Mamdouh bin Abdulaziz Al Saud
- House: Saud
- Father: Mamdouh bin Abdulaziz Al Saud
- Mother: Fayza bint Nayef bin Nuri al-Shaalan
- Education: King Abdul Aziz University; Islamic University of Madinah

Nayef bin Mamdouh Al Saud (Arabic: نايف بن ممدوح بن عبد العزيز آل سعود; born 1971) is a member of the Saudi royal family, one of the grandsons of Saudi Arabia's founder King Abdulaziz.

== Biography ==
Nayef is the son of Mamdouh bin Abdulaziz, former governor of Tabuk Province. He received his bachelor's degree in Islamic Studies from King Abdul Aziz University in Jeddah, and a master's degree in Islamic theology at the Islamic University of Madinah.

Nayef is known for his inventions, which include a rescue and relief helicopter with a massive firefighting unit, for which he received a grand prize at the International Federation for Inventors (IFIA), Geneva International Exhibition of Inventions.

== Personal life ==
Prince Nayef is married and has six children:

- Prince Abdullah bin Nayef
- Prince Abdul Rahman bin Nayef
- Prince Nawwaf bin Nayef
- Princess Faiza bint Nayef
- Princess Sultana bint Nayef
- Princess Noura bint Nayef
