= Nayef bin Ahmed Al Saud =

Saudi Arabian prince, security officer and businessman (born 1965)

Head of land forces intelligence and security commission
- In office: ? – March 2020
- Monarch: King Salman
- Born: 15 July 1965 (age 61)
- Spouse: Fahda bint Khalid bin Abdullah Al Saud
Names
- Nayef bin Ahmed bin Abdulaziz bin Abdul Rahman bin Faisal Al Saud
- House: House of Saud
- Father: Ahmed bin Abdulaziz
- Education: King Abdulaziz War College; Georgetown University; George Washington University; Cambridge University

Nayef bin Ahmed Al Saud (born 15 July 1965) is a member of Saudi royal family, a grandson of King Abdulaziz, and a military official who was the head of land forces intelligence and security authority. He was detained in March 2020 together with other Saudi royals, including former Crown Prince Mohammed bin Nayef, his father, Ahmed bin Abdulaziz and Nawwaf bin Nayef.

== Early life and education ==
Nayef bin Ahmed was born on 15 July 1965. He is one of Prince Ahmed's children.

Prince Nayef is a graduate of King Abdulaziz War College. In 1986, he received a master's degree in international relations from Georgetown University. Then he obtained another master's degree in business administration from George Washington University. He obtained a PhD from Cambridge University.

== Career ==
In the early 2000s Prince Nayef was a colonel in the Saudi Armed Forces dealing with strategic planning. He also worked at the Ministry of Interior in various capacities. He served as the head of land forces intelligence and security commission.

=== Arrest ===
Prince Nayef was arrested in early March 2020.

== Personal life ==
Prince Nayef's wife, Fahda, is the daughter of Khalid bin Abdullah and Al Jawhara bint Abdulaziz.
