= Khalid bin Abdullah Al Saud (born 1950) =

Saudi royal and businessman (born 1951)

- Born: 1950 (age 75–76); Riyadh
- Spouse: Noura bint Abdullah bin Muhammad bin Saud Al Kabir
- Issue: Two sons and three daughters
- House: Al Saud
- Father: King Abdullah
- Mother: Munira bint Abdullah Al Sheikh
- Education: King Abdulaziz University

Khalid bin Abdullah Al Saud (Arabic: خالد بن عبدالله آل سعود; born 1950) is the second eldest child of King Abdullah and a grandson of Saudi's founder King Abdulaziz. As the eldest living son of Abdullah, he is a member of the Allegiance Council.

== Early life and education ==
Khalid bin Abdullah was born in Riyadh in 1950 the second son of King Abdullah. His mother is Munira bint Abdullah Al Sheikh.

He was schooled with his younger brother Prince Mutaib at Taif-Barmana School in Lebanon and secondary school in Jeddah. He obtained a bachelor of arts degree in public administration from College of Commerce and Economics at King Abdulaziz University. He later graduated from Royal Military Academy Sandhurst.

== Career ==
After completing his education at Sandhurst, Prince Khaled first served as Director of Administration and Planning at the National Guard from 1974 to 1976. Following the Grand Mosque Seizure in 1979, he was appointed deputy commander of the Saudi Arabian National Guard West. Later he commanded the National Guard in the Eastern Province. He remained in this post until 1992. In fact, he was dismissed from the National Guard in 1992 following policy disagreements with his father's advisors.

He is the honorary President of the Jeddah football club Al Ahli. He was a member of Saudi Arabia Football Federation. He is a member of the KAUST Board of Trustees, and the board of the King Abdulaziz and His Companions Foundation for Giftedness and Creativity.

He owns the Saudi Arabian Insurance Company with his sons. They own Technical Support and Operational Services, a limited liability company, founded in 1998.

== Personal life ==
Khalid bin Abdullah is married to Noura bint Abdallah bin Muhammad Al Saud Al Kabir (born 1958). She is the daughter of his paternal aunt, Seeta bint Abdulaziz. They have five children: Duna (born 1981), Faisal (born 1983), Abdulaziz (born 1986), Latifa (born 1992) and Abeer (born 1997).

On 11 June 2011, the Associated Press (AP) erroneously reported Prince Khalid as having died, confusing him with King Abdullah's grand-nephew Khalid bin Abdullah bin Saud bin Abdulaziz. On 12 June 2011, AP sent a retraction correcting the earlier false report of Khalid's demise.
