= Abdul Elah bin Abdulaziz Al Saud =

Saudi royal and government official (born 1939)

Governor of Al Qassim Province
- Reign: 1982–March 1992
- Predecessor: Fahd bin Mohammed bin Abdul Rahman Al Saud
- Successor: Faisal bin Bandar
- Monarch: King Khalid; King Fahd

Governor of Al Jawf Province
- In office: 1998–2001
- Predecessor: Sultan bin Abdul Rahman Al Sudairi
- Successor: Fahd bin Badr Al Saud
- Monarch: King Fahd
- Born: 1939 (age 86–87)
- Spouse: Noura bint Abdul Rahman Al Sudairi; Salwa Al Ahmed
- House: Al Saud
- Father: King Abdulaziz
- Mother: Haya bint Saad Al Sudairi

Abdul Elah bin Abdulaziz Al Saud (Arabic: عبد الإله بن عبد العزيز آل سعود ʿAbd al ʾIlāh bin ʿAbd al ʿAzīz Āl Saʿūd), also spelled Abdulillah, born 1939) is a member of the Saudi royal family. He is a son of King Abdulaziz of Saudi Arabia and was an advisor to another of Abdulaziz's sons, King Abdullah. Prince Abdul Elah is the second oldest surviving son of Abdulaziz, the eldest being King Salman.

== Early life ==
Prince Abdul Elah was born in 1939. He is the son of King Abdulaziz and Haya bint Saad Al Sudairi, a member of the powerful Sudairi family who died in Riyadh on 18 April 2003 at the age of 90. He is a full brother of Prince Badr and Prince Abdul Majeed.

== Career ==
Prince Abdul Elah was appointed governor of Al Qassim Province on 19 March 1980 replacing Fahd bin Mohammed bin Abdul Rahman in the post. In May 1991 he did not allow two radical clerics in Buraidah to deliver Friday sermons. The incident caused conflict, and thousands of people, led by the local ulema and the religious police, protested against him. Sheik Abdulaziz bin Baz who was the head of the Supreme Religious Council, sent a letter to Prince Abdul Elah backing the preachers. Prince Abdul Elah's tenure ended in March 1992. Then, he was appointed governor of Al Jawf Province in 1998 replacing Sultan bin Abdurrahman Al Sudairi in the post and was in office until 2001 when Fahd bin Badr Al Saud succeeded him as governor.

Abdul Elah accompanied Abdullah on diplomatic trips abroad, when Abdullah was Crown Prince. He is a member of the Allegiance Council. On 8 October 2008, he was appointed as adviser to King Abdullah with the rank of minister. Prince Abdul Elah became an advisor to King Salman in January 2015.

Abdul Elah has also engaged in business activities. He is an entrepreneur and chairman of several companies, including the Arabian Jewelry Company, National Investment Company, and the National Automobile Company.

== Succession ==
Although Prince Abdul Elah was considered a candidate for the throne by virtue of seniority, he had some drawbacks such as his ill-starred government career. Since he was twice removed from governorships, there were doubts about his competency. He was passed over in favor of Prince Muqrin for the post of Deputy Crown Prince.

== Personal life ==
Prince Abdul Elah is married to Noura bint Abdul Rahman Al Sudairi and to Princess Salwa Al Ahmed, a medical doctor. His children, two sons and three daughters, are Abdulaziz (born 1965), a stakeholder in Al-Rajhi Bank, Abdul Majid and Fahda (twins, born 1993), Noura (born 2002) and Mashael (born 1970).
