= Abdulaziz bin Ahmed Al Saud =

Saudi royal and businessman (born 1963)

- Born: 20 June 1963 (age 63); Redlands, California
- Issue: Turki; Maha
Names
- Abdulaziz bin Ahmed bin Abdulaziz Al Saud
- House: Al Saud
- Father: Ahmed bin Abdulaziz Al Saud
- Mother: Fahda bint Turki Al Sudairi
- Education: King Saud University

Abdulaziz bin Ahmed Al Saud (Arabic: عبدالعزيز بن أحمد بن عبدالعزيز; born 1963) is a Saudi royal, grandson of King Abdulaziz, and businessman.

== Early life and education ==
Prince Abdulaziz was born in Redlands, California, on 20 June 1963. His parents are Prince Ahmed bin Abdulaziz and Fahda bint Turki Al Sudairi. Prince Abdulaziz was born while his father was attending the University of Redlands.

Abdulaziz bin Ahmed graduated from King Saud University in 1986 with a double major in political science and administration science.

== Humanitarian contributions ==
Prince Abdulaziz is a leading humanitarian activist on the national, regional and international levels, with close links to the World Health Organization. He is founder and chairman of IMPACT–Eastern Mediterranean Region (a regional non-governmental organization NGO that is active in the field of prevention of blindness), and Middle East African Council of Ophthalmology (MEACO). He is also chairman of Eastern Mediterranean Region of the International Agency for the Prevention of Blindness (EMR-IAPB) and President of Saudi Ophthalmological Society (SOS). He is a member in the IAPB board of trustees. He was board member of Disabled Children Association of Saudi Arabia. He is also global ambassador of the International Trachoma Initiative and a member of the International Council of Ophthalmology Foundation (ICOF).

== Awards ==
Abdulaziz bin Ahmed received the Global Lifetime Achievement Award from the International Agency for the Prevention of Blindness (IAPB) during its 7th General Assembly in Dubai in September 2004, the Shield of the joint 4th International Conference for the Arab Ophthalmology Association and the 1st Bahrain Ophthalmology Conference in recognition of his regional and global efforts endorsing the ‘VISION 2020:The Right to Sight' global initiative. These efforts resulted in VISION 2020 adoption in all 22 countries of EMR region by September 2004. He also received the Sheikh Hamdan bin Rashid Al Maktoum Award by the Emirates Ophthalmic Society in recognition of his dedicated work in the field of Prevention of Blindness in April 2005 and the Order of the Two Niles Medal by President of Sudan General Omar Al Bashir in November 2005.

In 2007, Prince Abdulaziz was awarded an Honorary Fellowship of the Royal College of Surgeons in Ireland (RCSI).

== Investments ==
Abdulaziz bin Ahmed is a businessman. He is the chairman of Atheeb Group, a diversified investment conglomerate with stakes in telecommunications, contracting, defense, ports, shipping and other industries. He is also the CEO of Atheeb Trading Company. In addition, he is actively involved as a major partner in numerous leading Saudi private and joint venture business and industries.

== Personal life ==
Abdulaziz bin Ahmed is married and has two children: Turki and Maha bint Abdulaziz. He is known to be fond of falcon hunting and horses, and he owns Athba stables which include a large number of fine horses.
