= Abdul Majeed bin Abdulaziz Al Saud =

Saudi royal, politician, and businessman (1942–2007)

Governor of Tabuk Province
- Tenure: 19 March 1980 – 1986
- Predecessor: Sulaiman bin Turki bin Suleiman Al Sudairi
- Successor: Mamdouh bin Abdulaziz Al Saud
- Monarch: Khalid

Governor of Medina Province
- Tenure: 1986 – 1999
- Predecessor: Abdul Muhsin bin Abdulaziz Al Saud
- Successor: Muqrin bin Abdulaziz Al Saud
- Monarch: Fahd

Governor of Makkah Region
- Tenure: 2000 – 5 May 2007
- Predecessor: Majid bin Abdulaziz Al Saud
- Successor: Khalid bin Faisal Al Saud
- Monarch: Fahd; Abdullah
- Born: 1942; Riyadh, Saudi Arabia
- Died: 5 May 2007 (aged 64–65); Seattle, Washington, U.S.
- Burial: 7 May 2007; Al Oud Cemetery, Riyadh
- Spouse: Al Jawhara bint Abdullah Al Sudairi; Sara bint Abdul Mohsen Al Angari
- Issue: Prince Faisal; Princess Jamila
Names
- Abdul Majeed bin Abdulaziz bin Abdul Rahman bin Faisal Al Saud
- House: Al Saud
- Father: King Abdulaziz
- Mother: Haya bint Saad Al Sudairi

Abdul Majeed bin Abdulaziz Al Saud (Arabic: عبد المجيد بن عبد العزيز آل سعود, romanized: ʿAbd al Majīd bin ʿAbd al ʿAzīz ʾĀl Suʿūd) (1942 – 5 May 2007) was a Saudi Arabian politician and businessman who served successively as the governor of the Tabuk, Medina, and Mecca provinces between 1980 and 2007. A prominent member of the House of Saud, Abdul Majeed was seen as a close ally of King Abdullah, as well as a long-time ally of the Sudairi Seven.

== Early life and education ==
Prince Abdul Majeed was born in Riyadh in 1942 as the 33rd son of King Abdulaziz. Another report mentions his birth year as 1941. His mother was King Abdulaziz's tenth wife, Haya bint Saad Al Sudairi who died on 18 April 2003 at age 90. She was a member of the Sudairi family and the sister of Jawhara bint Saad, another spouse of King Abdulaziz. Prince Abdul Majeed's full brothers were Prince Badr and Prince Abdul Ilah.

Abdul Majeed bin Abdulaziz received his early education in Riyadh in traditional schools, including the Sheikh Abdullah Al Khayyat and the Al Anjal School. He joined the Royal Saudi Navy in 1954 and then studied in the United Kingdom.

== Career ==
Abdul Majeed served as governor of Tabuk Province, Medina Province, and Mecca Province. After completing his education, he was appointed governor of the northerly Tabuk province on 19 March 1980, replacing Suleiman bin Turki Al Sudairi in the post. Agriculture was developed in the province during his governorship, and the region became one of the kingdom's main producers of crops such as wheat and fruit. His tenure lasted for six years until 1986.

After the death of Prince Abdul Muhsin in 1986, Prince Abdul Majeed replaced him as governor of Medina Province. The Prophet's Mosque in Medina and surrounding areas were redeveloped during his 14-year term of office. His tenure lasted until 1999 when he was succeeded by Prince Muqrin in the post.

In 2000 Prince Abdul Majeed was appointed governor of Mecca province and chairman of the Mecca development authority. He was also chief of the central hajj committee. In 2000 Mecca became the provincial capital of the region including Jeddah. An ambitious program of development was undertaken in Mecca under his stewardship at a cost of more than US$27 billion. The developments were centred on the Two Holy Mosques, the Masjid al-Haram in Mecca and the Masjid-e-Nabawi in Medina, the key destinations of the annual Hajj pilgrimage, attracting millions of visitors each year. Huge commercial developments sprouted in surrounding areas, such as the Jebel Omar scheme, including hotels, convention and conference centres, and prayer facilities. Architectural historians criticised the accompanying destruction of historic sites. On the other hand, communication links were improved, including port facilities in Jeddah, airports, and roads. In addition, Abdul Majeed initiated the restoration and development plans of old city of Jeddah. The Khadeeja bint Khuwailed Centre for Businesswomen was established in Jeddah in 2003 by the Jeddah Chamber of Commerce and Industry under his patronage.

== Other positions and views ==
Abdul Majeed also served on many public and charitable committees. He pushed for the creation of a motor racing track in Jeddah, the first in the Kingdom. He was also an early supporter of blood testing before marriage so as to avoid blood diseases. The procedure has since become obligatory. At the beginning of the 2000s he publicly announced that the existing regulations for foreign workers in the country should be modified.

Abdul Majeed also called for greater participation of women in public life. "Prince Abdul Majeed has been a major supporter of Saudi businesswomen," said Hussa Al Aun, a member of the Jeddah Chamber of Commerce and Industry (JCCI). He also supported the launch of an anti-terror initiative in the province's schools in December 2006.

Abdul Majeed also had business activities. While he was governor of Tabuk, he founded the Tabuk Agricultural Development company which produced wheat in the region. He also established the Taiba Investment Corporation in Medina.

=== Succession ===
Abdul Majeed was considered to be one of the potential candidates for the throne at the beginning of the 2000s. He was also considered as an eligible contender following the death of King Fahd in August 2005.

== Personal life ==
One of Prince Abdul Majeed's wives was Al Jawhara bint Abdullah bin Saad Al Sudairi. He also married Sara bint Abdul Mohsen Al Angari and had one son, Faisal bin Abdul Majeed. His son, Faisal, is a businessman and a member of the board of trustees of the Arab Thought Foundation.

His wife, Sara bint Abdul Mohsen, donated 1 million riyals to a psychiatric hospital in Mecca during his governorship of Mecca Province. During the same period, she paid the hospital expenses of a woman who experienced serious domestic violence by her husband in 2001.

Abdul Majeed's daughter, Jamila, is the first Saudi woman to participate in a camel race.

== Death and legacy ==
Prince Abdul Majeed suffered from leukaemia and had undergone surgery in the U.S. and then had travelled back to Saudi Arabia. However, he was flown back to the U.S. when his condition worsened. He died in Seattle on 5 May 2007 at age 65. His body was taken from the U.S. to Riyadh on 6 May 2007. Funeral prayers for him were performed at Imam Turki ibn Abdullah Mosque in Riyadh after Dhuhr prayers on 7 May 2007.

== Legacy ==
Prince Abdul Majeed bin Abdul Aziz Domestic Airport in Medina was named after Prince Abdul Majeed.
