= Ministry of Municipalities and Housing =

Government ministry of Saudi Arabia

- وزارة البلديات و الإسكان

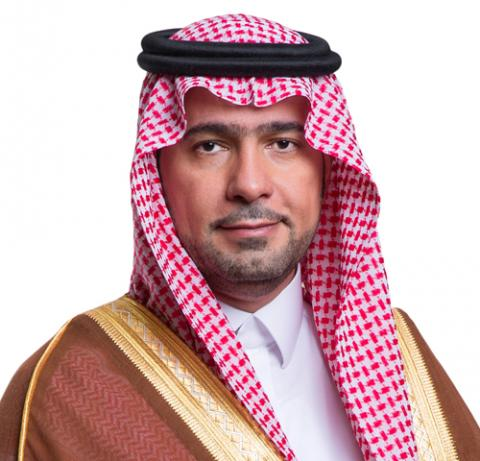
- Majid Al-Hogail, the current Minister of Municipalities and Housing since 1 January 2021

Agency overview
- Formed: 13 October 1975; 50 years ago
- Jurisdiction: Government of Saudi Arabia
- Headquarters: Riyadh
- Minister responsible: Majid Al-Hogail
- Website: www.momrah.gov.sa/ar

The Ministry of Municipalities and Housing (Note: Arabic: وزارة البلديات والإسكان) is a government ministry in Saudi Arabia responsible for overseeing and regulating municipalities across the Kingdom, as well as supervising urban development and the housing sector.

== History ==
The ministry was established in 1975 as the Ministry of Municipal and Rural Affairs to oversee urban planning, infrastructure, and municipal services across Saudi Arabia.

In 2003, it took over the responsibilities of the dissolved Ministry of Public Works and Housing, while a separate Ministry of Housing was created in 2011 to address growing national housing needs.

In January 2021, the two entities were merged, and in July 2024, the ministry was renamed the Ministry of Municipalities and Housing to reflect its expanded role in integrated urban development and improving quality of life in Saudi cities.

== List of ministers ==
No.	Portrait	Official	Took office	Left office	Time in office
Ministers of Municipal and Rural Affairs (1975–2021)
1		Majid bin Abdulaziz	13 October 1975	3 March 1980	4 years, 4 months, 18 days
2		Mutaib bin Abdulaziz	3 March 1980	13 April 1983	3 years, 1 month, 10 days
3		Ibrahim Al-Anqari	13 April 1983	9 July 1989	6 years, 2 months, 26 days
4		Khalid Al-Anqari	9 July 1989	31 July 1991	2 years, 22 days
5		Mohammed Al-Sheikh	31 July 1991	2 August 1995	4 years, 2 days
6		Mohammed Al-Jarallah	2 August 1995	1 May 2003	7 years, 8 months, 29 days
7		Mutaib bin Abdulaziz	1 May 2003	2 November 2009	6 years, 6 months, 1 day
8		Mansour bin Mutaib	2 November 2009	29 January 2015	5 years, 2 months, 27 days
9		Abdullatif Al-Sheikh	29 January 2015	27 December 2018	3 years, 10 months, 28 days
—		Majid Al-Qasabi (Acting)	27 December 2018	25 February 2020	1 year, 1 month, 29 days
—		Majid Al-Hogail (Acting)	25 February 2020	24 January 2021	10 months, 30 days
Ministers of Municipal, Rural Affairs and Housing (2021–2024)
1		Majid Al-Hogail	24 January 2021	21 July 2024	3 years, 5 months, 27 days
Ministers of Municipalities and Housing (2024–present)
1		Majid Al-Hogail	21 July 2024	Incumbent	1 year, 238 days

== See also ==
- Ministries of Saudi Arabia
