= Mishaal bin Majid Al Saud =

Saudi royal (born 1957)

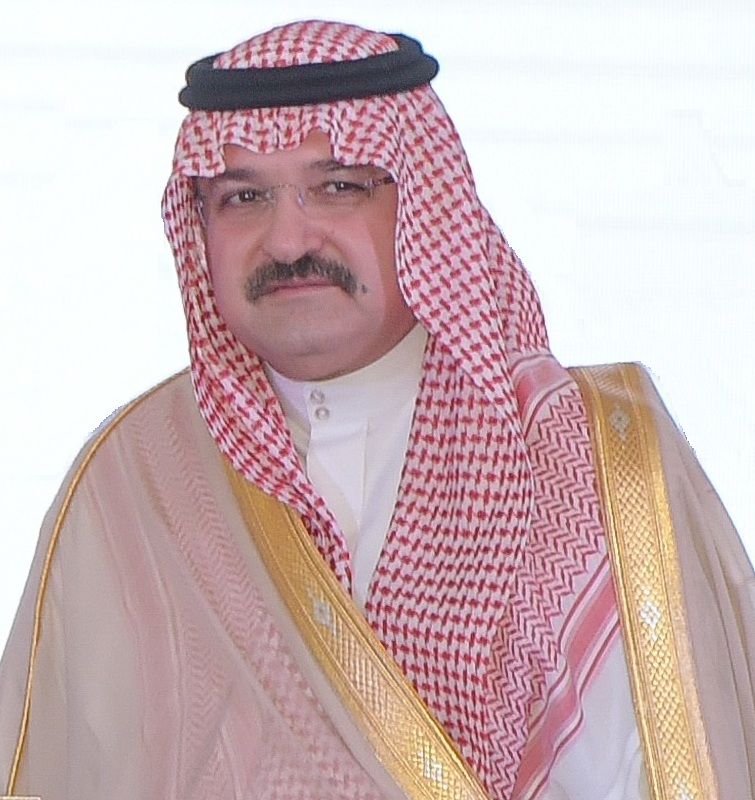
- Mishaal bin Majid Al Saud in 2018

Mayor of Jeddah city
- In office: 1997-2018
- Predecessor: Nazir bin Hasan Naseef
- Successor: Saleh Al-Turki
- Monarch: King Fahd; King Abdullah; King Salman
- Born: 1957 (age 68–69); Riyadh, Saudi Arabia
- Spouse: Al Jawhara bint Khalid bin Musaid Al Saud
- Issue: Muhdi; Mashæl; Nuf; Khalid
Names
- Mishaal bin Majid bin Abdulaziz bin Abdul Rahman bin Faisal Al Saud
- House: Al Saud
- Father: Majid bin Abdulaziz
- Mother: Nouf bint Abdallah Al Fahd Al Muhanna
- Education: King Saud University

Mishaal bin Majid Al Saud (Arabic: مشعل بن ماجد بن عبد العزيز آل سعود) (born 1957) was the governor of Jeddah, a member of the House of Saud, and one of the grandsons of Saudi's founder King Abdulaziz.

== Early life and education ==
Mishaal bin Majid was born in Riyadh in 1957. His family moved to Jeddah in 1971. His father is Majid bin Abdulaziz, a son of King Abdulaziz and a full-brother of Prince Sattam. The mother of Prince Mishaal is Nouf bint Abdallah Al Fahd Al Muhanna.

Prince Mishaal is full brother of Prince Abdulaziz and has also five sisters. One of his sisters, Jawaher bint Majid, is the first Saudi woman to have been granted the title of the patron of arts in Saudi Arabia. Another, Basma bint Majid, married Bandar bin Faisal, one of King Faisal's sons.

Mishaal bin Majid was educated entirely in Saudi Arabia and is a graduate of King Saud University with a degree in business administration.

== Career ==
Prior to becoming Jeddah governor in 1998, Mishaal bin Majid is reported to have spent 16 years in the private sector. He replaced Nazir bin Hasan Naseef in the post.

The Jeddah governor, a position less than the governor of a province but more than the governor of a typical town, works as a separate department under the Makkah Region governor and in close association with the ministry of interior. Frequently seen publicly around Jeddah attending openings, ceremonies and weddings, Prince Mishaal appears approachable and engaged.

Okaz's comments praising Mishaal bin Majid for preserving traditional values and culture were notable given that he is the governor of the Kingdom's most liberal city, Jeddah, and sent a message that King Abdullah still placed a significance on continuity, stability, and control, even as he pursued incremental reforms.

== Other positions ==
Mishaal bin Majid has been a member of the Allegiance Council since 2007. He is president of the governing council of the Assembly and President of the Social Development Forum that attempts to address the role of voluntary social work and the implementation of initiatives aimed at promoting social development to attain a consolidated society in which individuals who have attained better living standards want to help others achieve the same goal and to establish the concept of individual empowerment through each person discovering their own capabilities and fulfilling their potential without reliance on others. The forum is organized biennially by the Society of Majid bin Abdulaziz for Development and Social Services, a non-profit organization recognized in 2010 as the leading non-profit in sustainable development. This award was presented during the 27th session of the Council of Ministers of Social Affairs in the Gulf Cooperation Council (GCC). He is also the board chairman of the Society of Majid bin Abdulaziz for Development and Social Services.

On 15 April 2021, Prince Mishaal was named by King Salman as one of his advisors at the rank of minister.

== Views ==
King Abdullah curtailed several privileges previously granted to Saudi royal family members, including free cellphone service for thousands of princes and princesses, year-round government-paid hotel suites in Jeddah, and unlimited complimentary tickets from the state airline. Some royals were angered by these restrictions. Mishal bin Majid reportedly began driving between Jeddah and Riyadh to express his displeasure with the reforms.

== Personal life ==
Prince Mishaal is married to Al Jawhara bint Khalid bin Musaid Al Saud, and has four children: Muhdi, Mishail, Nuf and Khalid. He speaks fluent English more characteristic of a Saudi who has spent years in the U.S. He has traveled frequently to Florida and California as a tourist.
