= Real Estate General Authority =

- الهيئة العامة للعقار الهيئة العامة للعقار

Agency overview
- Formed: 2017
- Jurisdiction: Saudi Arabia
- Headquarters: Riyadh, Saudi Arabia
- Agency executive: Abdullah bin Saud Al-Hammad, CEO
- Website: rega.gov.sa

The Real Estate General Authority (REGA; Arabic: الهيئة العامة للعقار) is a Saudi government agency that was established in 2017 by Council of Ministers Decision No. 239, to regulate rules, stimulate investment, and provide consumer protection in the real estate industry in Saudi Arabia. It handles real estate registration, licenses real estate activities, oversees operations, and establishes standards and regulations.

The authority's work is part of Saudi Vision 2030. Within this framework, the Comprehensive Strategy for the Real Estate Sector was approved by Council of Ministers Resolution No. 252 on 23/04/1442 AH. The strategy is built upon four main pillars: sector governance, market efficiency, stakeholder service, and sector sustainability.

== Functions ==
The authority supervises and monitors real estate registration, proposes laws and legislation, carries out inspections, and encourages real estate investment. It also licenses real estate practitioners, trains them, and sets the standards they must meet.

== Real Estate Brokerage Law ==
The Real Estate Brokerage Law, which regulates real estate brokers in Saudi Arabia, was approved by the cabinet on 28 June 2022 and came into force on 18 January 2023. The law barred brokers from operating without a REGA license, and they had 180 days to obtain one. The license was free during that period. In the first two days, more than 89,000 license requests were submitted, and over 72,000 individual licenses and 17,100 establishment licenses were issued. By July 2025, REGA had recorded about SR 1.2 trillion in transactions, and issued more than 86,000 broker licenses.

Rents were frozen for five years in Riyadh from 25 September 2025, as part of measures to curb rising rents. The authority enforces these measures and can extend them to other cities with the approval of the CEDA.

== Ejar platform ==
Ejar, an online platform for rental contracts, launched in February 2018. By the end of 2023, REGA reported that more than 8 million leases had been recorded on it, including 6.6 million residential leases and over 1.3 million commercial leases. More than 2.8 million leases were recorded in 2023 alone.

Following a cabinet decision, REGA required residential rent to be paid solely via Ejar from 15 January 2024. Any amounts paid outside the platform no longer count as proof of payment, and commercial leases are excluded from this restriction.

In Riyadh, after the September 2025 rent freeze, all leases must be registered on Ejar.

== Structure ==
The authority is headquartered in Riyadh, and it is financially and administratively independent. The authority is governed by a board of directors chaired by the Minister of Municipalities and Housing. As of September 2024, the chair was Majid Al-Hogail.
