= Mexico–Saudi Arabia relations =

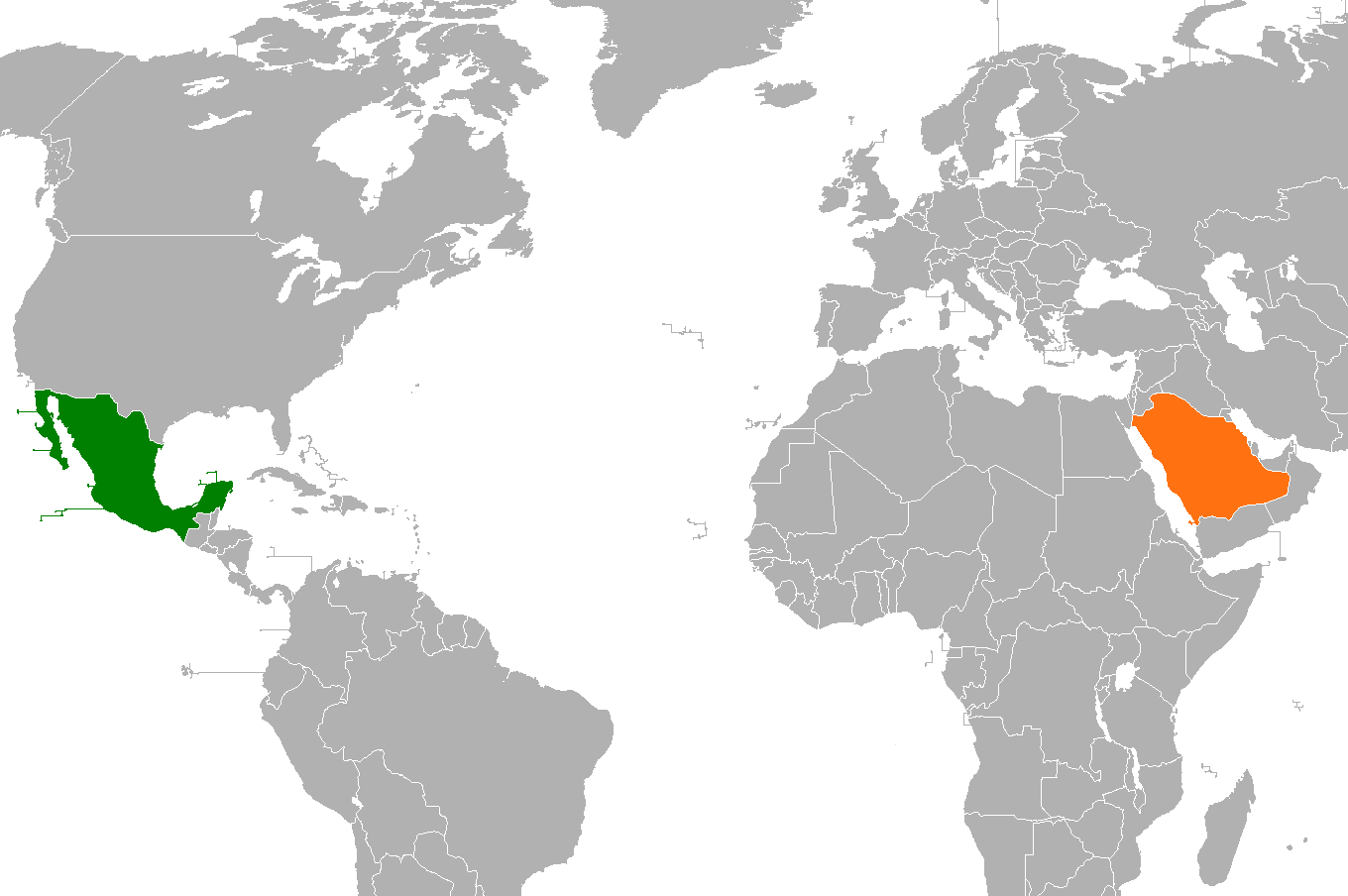

- Mexico: Saudi Arabia

The nations of Mexico and Saudi Arabia established diplomatic relations in 1952. Both nations are mutual members of the G-20 major economies and the United Nations.

== History ==
Mexico and Saudi Arabia established diplomatic relations on 12 September 1952. On 31 July 1975, Mexican President Luis Echeverría paid a five-day visit to Saudi Arabia and met with King Khalid bin Abdulaziz Al Saud in Jeddah. The two leaders also discussed current events taking place in the Middle East at the time.

In October 1981, Saudi Crown Prince Fahd bin Abdulaziz Al Saud visited Mexico to attend the North–South Summit and met with President José López Portillo. In 1981, both nations opened embassies in each other's capital's, respectively.

In 2002, Mexico closed its embassy Riyadh due to budgetary restraints. The embassy was re-opened in 2004. In June 2010, Mexican Foreign Secretary Patricia Espinosa paid a visit to Saudi Arabia. In March 2014, Mexican Foreign Secretary José Antonio Meade paid a visit to Saudi Arabia.

In January 2016, Mexican President Enrique Peña Nieto, paid an official visit to Saudi Arabia. During his visit, President Peña Nieto met with King Salman bin Abdulaziz Al Saud and together they signed 11 bilateral agreements. President Peña Nieto also awarded the Order of the Aztec Eagle to King Salman. In December 2018, Saudi Minister of State Mansour bin Mutaib Al Saud attended the inauguration for President Andrés Manuel López Obrador.

In March 2022, Mexican Foreign Secretary Marcelo Ebrard paid a visit to Saudi Arabia and met with his counterpart Foreign Minister Faisal bin Farhan Al Saud. During the visit, both nations agreed to strengthen bilateral economic relations and spoke of a need for a direct air route between the two nations. That same year, both nations celebrated 70 years of diplomatic relations.

== High-level visits ==
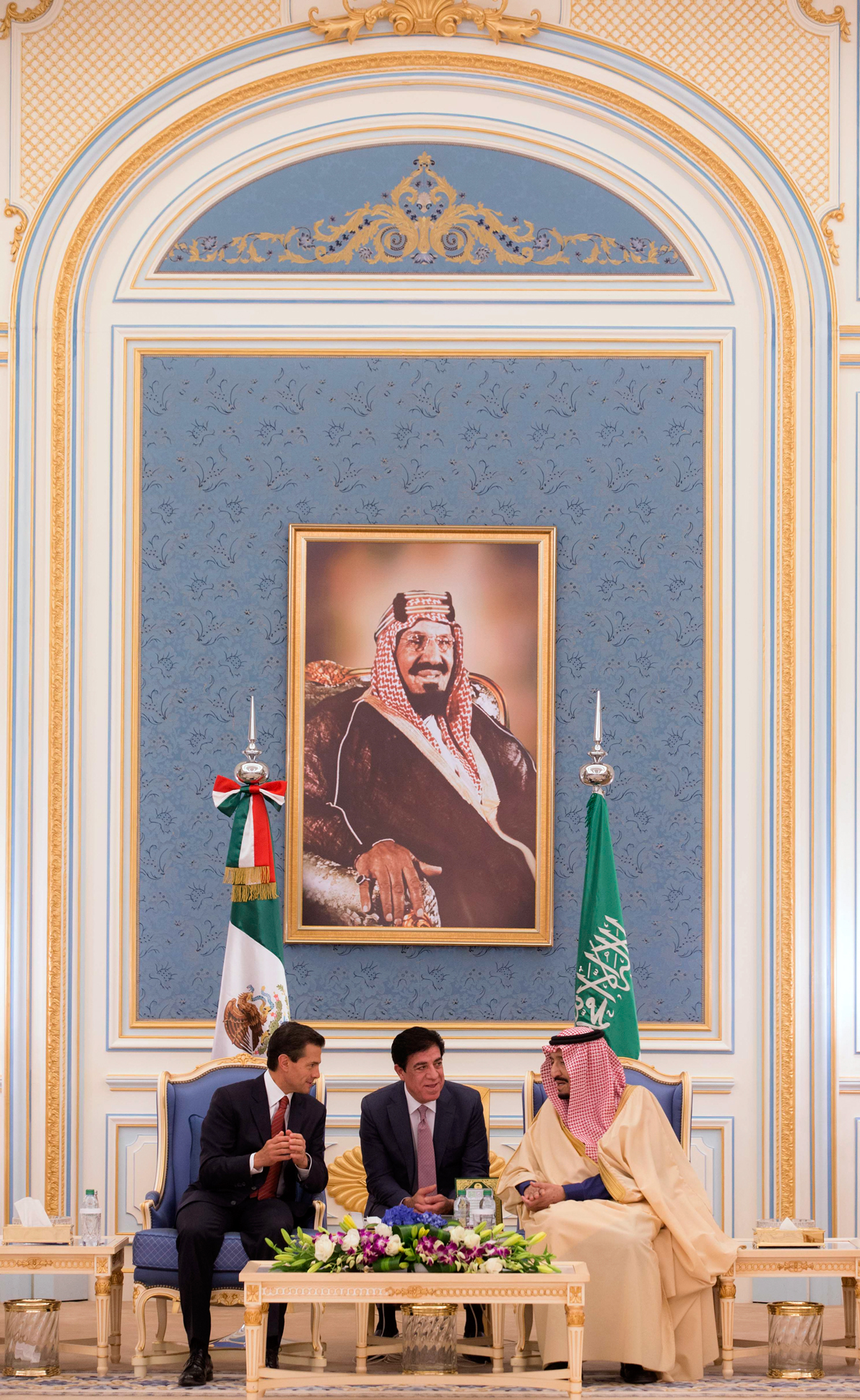
Mexican President Enrique Peña Nieto along with King Salman of Saudi Arabia in Riyadh; January 2016.

High-level visits from Mexico to Saudi Arabia

- President Luis Echeverría (1975)
- Foreign Secretary Patricia Espinosa (2010)
- Foreign Undersecretary Lourdes Aranda (2011)
- Foreign Secretary José Antonio Meade (2014)
- Foreign Undersecretary Carlos de Icaza (2014, 2015)
- President Enrique Peña Nieto (2016)
- Foreign Secretary Marcelo Ebrard (2022)
- Foreign Undersecretary María Teresa Mercado Pérez (2024)

High-level visits from Saudi Arabia to Mexico

- Crown Prince Fahd bin Abdulaziz Al Saud (1981)
- Minister of Finance Ibrahim Abdulaziz Al-Assaf (2012)
- Minister of State Mansour bin Mutaib Al Saud (2018)

== Bilateral agreements ==
Both nations have signed several bilateral agreements such as a Memorandum of Understanding of Cooperation between both nations Diplomatic Institutions (2009); Memorandum of Understanding for the Establishment of Political Consultations on Issues of Mutual Interest (2014); Agreement to Avoid Double Taxation and Prevent Tax Evasion in the Matter of Income Taxes and its Protocol (2016); Memorandum of Understanding on Tourism Cooperation (2016); Memorandum of Understanding on Scientific and Educational Cooperation (2016); Agreement on Technical Cooperation (2016); Agreement of Cooperation between both nations Banks for Development and Exportations (2016); Agreement on Air Services (2016); Memorandum of Understanding in Cooperation the Oil and Gas Sectors (2016); Memorandum of Understanding between Pemex and Saudi Aramco (2016); and an Agreement of Cooperation to Combat Organized Crime (2017).

== Trade relations ==
In 2023, two-way trade between both nations amounted to US$844 million. Mexico's main exports to Saudi Arabia include: motor vehicles for the transports of goods and people, tubes and pipes of iron or steel, telephones and mobile phones, electronics, machinery, chemical based products, rubber tires, vegetables, fruits and nuts, chocolate, honey, and seafood. Saudi Arabia's main exports to Mexico include: chemical based products, polymers and polyacetals based products, turbojets, turbo propellers and other gas turbines, copper ores and concentrates, glass, parts and accessories for motor vehicles, sugar cane or beet sugar, tools, hides and skins. Mexican multinational company KidZania and Zeomex operate in Saudi Arabia.

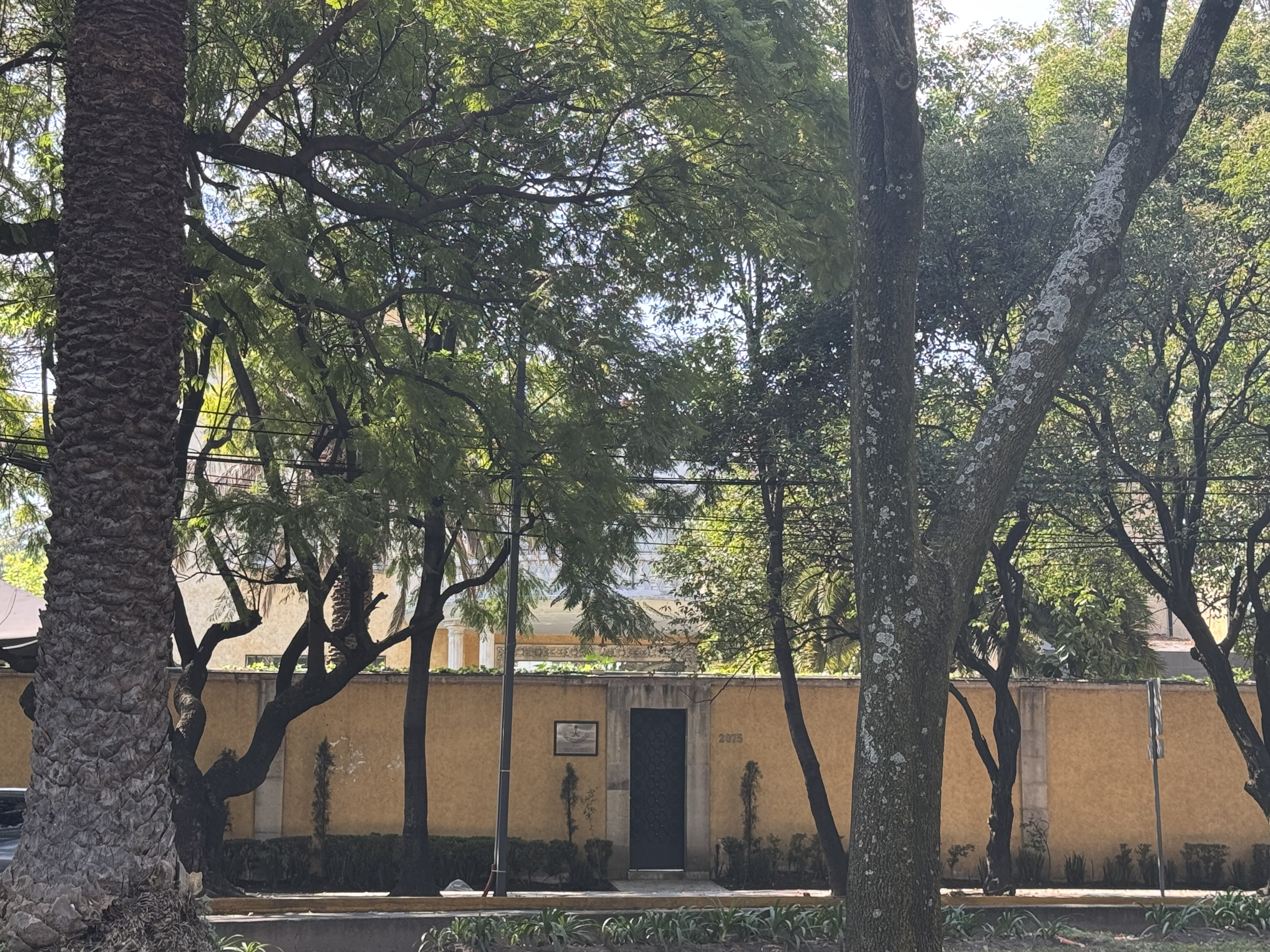
Embassy of Saudi Arabia in Mexico City

== Resident diplomatic missions ==
- Mexico has an embassy in Riyadh.
- Saudi Arabia has an embassy in Mexico City.

== See also ==
- Arab Mexicans
- Islam in Mexico
