= Abdulaziz bin Majid Al Saud =

Saudi royal and governor of Madinah province (born 1960)

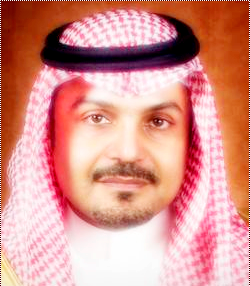
- Abdulaziz bin Majid in 2010

Governor of Madinah Province
- In office: 22 October 2005 – 14 January 2013
- Predecessor: Muqrin bin Abdulaziz Al Saud
- Successor: Faisal bin Salman Al Saud
- Monarch: King Abdullah
- Born: 1960 (age 65–66)
- Spouse: Princess Nuha bint Saud; Princess Haifa bint Fahd Al Sudairi
- Issue: List: Prince Saud Prince Omar Prince Abdullah Princess Lolowah
Names
- Abdulaziz bin Majid bin Abdulaziz bin Abdul Rahman bin Faisal bin Turki bin Abdullah bin Muhammad bin Saud
- House: Al Saud
- Father: Majid bin Abdulaziz Al Saud
- Mother: Nuf bint Abdallah Al Fahd Al Muhanna
- Education: King Fahd University of Petroleum and Minerals

Abdulaziz bin Majid Al Saud (Arabic: عبد العزيز بن ماجد بن عبد العزيز آل سعود; born 1960) is the former governor of Madinah Province and a member of House of Saud, one of the grandsons of Saudi's founder King Abdulaziz.

== Early life and education ==
Prince Abdulaziz was born in 1960. He is Majid bin Abdulaziz's second son. Abdulaziz's mother is Nuf bint Abdallah Al Fahd Al Muhanna. He is the full brother of Prince Mishaal, and he also has five sisters. One of his sisters, Jawaher bint Majid, is the first Saudi woman to have been granted the title of the patron of arts in Saudi Arabia. Another, Basma bint Majid, married Bandar bin Faisal, one of King Faisal's sons.

Prince Abdulaziz is a graduate of King Fahd University of Petroleum and Minerals.

== Career ==
Abdulaziz bin Majid is former deputy governor of Al-Qassim Province where the governor was Faisal bin Bandar. His tenure lasted until October 2005. When then-governor of Madinah Province Muqrin bin Abdulaziz was appointed as head of the General Intelligence Presidency, Abdulaziz bin Majid replaced him in the post in October 2005. His term was extended for four years in 2009.

Prince Abdulaziz's term ended on 14 January 2013, and he was replaced by Prince Faisal bin Salman.

== Other positions ==
Abdulaziz bin Majid was vice chairman of the Majid Society until 2018 that was founded by his father in 1998 for charitable purposes.

== Personal life ==
Abdulaziz bin Majid is married to Princess Nuha, the daughter of Prince Saud bin Abdul Muhsin Al Saud. He has three sons and one daughter: Saud, Omar, Abdullah and Lolowah. He also wed Princess Haifa bint Fahd bin Turki bin Ahmed Al Sudairi who is the mother of Prince Saud. His another wife is Princess Halah bint Sattam, daughter of his uncle Prince Sattam.

Political offices
Preceded by Muqrin bin Abdulaziz	Governor of Madinah Province; 2005–2013	Succeeded by Faisal bin Salman
