= Haya bint Abdulaziz Al Saud =

Saudi royal

- Born: 1929
- Died: 2 November 2009 (aged 80); Riyadh
- Spouse: Muhammad bin Saud bin Abdul Rahman
Names
- Haya bint Abdulaziz bin Abdul Rahman bin Faisal Al Saud
- House: Al Saud
- Father: King Abdulaziz
- Mother: Muhdi

Haya bint Abdulaziz Al Saud (Arabic: هيا بنت عبد العزيز آل سعود; 1929 – 2 November 2009) was a Saudi princess, daughter of King Abdulaziz and sister of King Saud and King Faisal. She was a contemporary to six Saudi kings from Ibn Saud to King Abd Allah.

== Early life ==
Princess Haya was born in 1929. She was a daughter of King Abdulaziz and Mudhi who was an Armenian woman. Haya bint Abdulaziz was the second oldest of their four children. She had three full siblings: an older sister, Princess Sultana, and two younger brothers, Prince Majid and Prince Sattam who is the former governor of Riyadh Province.

== Activities ==
Haya bint Abdulaziz became the patron of the Saudi Cricket Centre in 2001 which is the governing body of cricket in Saudi Arabia.

== Personal life ==
Haya bint Abdulaziz married Muhammad bin Saud bin Abdul Rahman Al Saud, a nephew of King Abdulaziz. They have four daughters; Sara, Anoud, Noura and mishael.

== Death and funeral ==
Haya bint Abdulaziz died of an illness at the King Faisal Specialist Hospital in Riyadh on 2 November 2009. She was 80 years old. Her funeral prayers was held at the Imam Turki bin Abdullah Mosque in Riyadh on 3 November 2009. King Abdullah attended her funeral prayers with other officials and dignitaries. Prince Fahd bin Mohammed bin Abdulaziz, Prince Mutaib bin Abdulaziz, Prince Bandar bin Mohammad bin Abdul Rahman, then Deputy Chief of the National Guard Prince Badr bin Abdulaziz, Prince Abdul Rahman bin Abdullah bin Abdul Rahman, Makkah Governor Prince Khalid Al Faisal bin Abdulaziz, then Deputy Interior Minister Prince Ahmed bin Abdulaziz and then Chief of General Intelligence Prince Miqren bin Abdulaziz also performed funeral prayers for her.
