= Shola Mall =

Shopping mall in Riyadh, Saudi Arabia

- الشعلة مول
- Shola Mall, 2025
- Location: Riyadh, Saudi Arabia
- Coordinates: 24°40′35″N 46°43′8″E
- Opened: April 1984; 42 years ago (as Shola Shopping Center); September 17, 2025; 14 months ago (as Shola Mall)
- Closed: 22 November 2012
- Developer: Bucheit Company
- Owner: Prince Mishaal bin Abdul Aziz
- Website: sholamall.com

Shola Mall (Arabic: الشعلة مول), formerly Shola Shopping Center (Arabic: مركز الشعلة التجاري), is a shopping complex in the ad-Dubbat neighborhood of Riyadh, Saudi Arabia. Opened in April 1984, it was one of the oldest shopping centers in Riyadh and was known for its gold markets. The complex was closed following a fire-breakout in November 2012 and was owned by Prince Mishaal bin Abdulaziz. It was reopened in September 2025 as one of the outlets of Al Wafa Hypermarket.

== History ==
=== Inauguration and 1980s ===
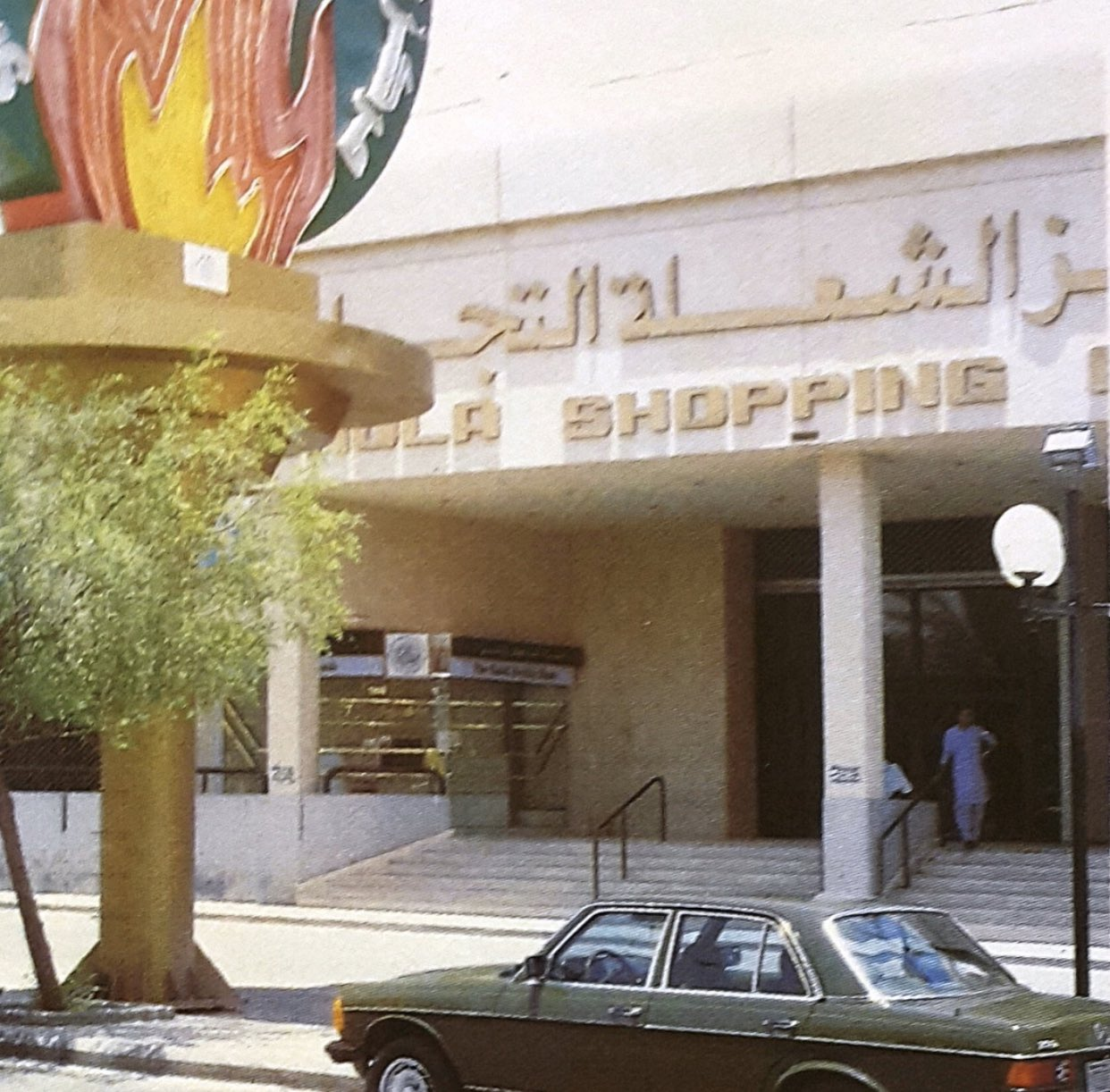
Shola Shopping Center in the 1980s

Shola Shopping Center was founded by Prince Mishaal bin Abdulaziz al-Saud, the young-half brother of King Fahd and owner of Al Shoula Group in 1984. According to The Washington Post in 1992, Prince Mishaal signed a contract worth almost $11.6 million dollars with Youngstown-based American firm Bucheit Companies in February 1981 to build a shopping complex in ad-Dhubbat neighborhood of Riyadh. The project was supposed to be completed by 1983, but was delayed until April 1984 mainly due to time-taking in removal a mosque standing at the site. However, a dispute erupted between Prince Mishaal and Bernard J. Bucheit Jr over payment issues when the prince allegedly refused to pay him in order to settle an earlier dispute and detained 15 employees of Bucheit in Riyadh by withholding their exit visas, until a negotiated settlement was reached for their release.

=== 1990s ===
Still unpaid by Prince Mishaal, Bucheit later in the 1990s sought the intervention of U.S. Congress in the matter and approached congressmen such as Rep. James A. Traficant Jr and Sen. John Glenn. Traficant even wrote to Prince Bandar bin Sultan al-Saud in 1991, then US ambassador to Saudi Arabia regarding Bucheit's case on behalf of the Committee on Standards of Official Conduct. Bucheit's case was also previously brought to the Saudi government by three former commerce secretaries. The dispute got settled when the Saudis and Bucheit reached an undisclosed settlement of $11.5 million dollars in December 1992.

Shola Shopping Center was infamous for being prone to frequent raids by the mutawa, the Saudi religious police. After the Gulf crisis began in 1990 and as US soldiers arrived in the country, including female troops and journalists, the mutawa increased its activity in order to contain the "so-called" Western influence in Saudi Arabia. The mutawa were accused of harassing and misbehaving with the customers and visitors in the shopping complex under the pretext of enforcing Islamic norms. When Prince Mishaal took notice of it, he threatened the mutawa of grave consequences if he ever saw them patrolling nearby the complex again.

=== 2000s ===
In 2001, Traficant was indicted on federal corruption charges for taking campaign funds for personal use. He opted to represent himself, insisting that the trial was part of a vendetta against him dating back to his 1983 trial. After a two-month federal trial, on April 11, 2002, he was convicted of 10 felony counts including bribery, racketeering, and tax evasion and was sentenced to eight years in prison. In 2003, as part of the probe against Traficant, Bucheit was put under federal trial for his alleged role in bribing the former member of HOR and was found guilty of illegally providing $30,000 worth of construction work to build an addition and deck at Traficant's farmhouse in 1993 in exchange for extracting $11.6 million from Prince Mishaal.

Shola Shopping Center was one of the three branches of Shola chain of commercial markets in Jeddah and Dhahran.

=== Fire accident ===
On 22 November 2012, an unexpected fire broke out in the north-east corner of the complex at 3 am (local time). The Saudi Civil Defense immediately reached the site brought the fire under control. The market suffered heavy damage in material and subsequently went defunct.

=== Reopening ===
In 2022, the market began undergoing renovation . It was reopened as Shola Mall on 17 September 2025.
