= Jawaher bint Majid Al Saud =

Saudi royal and patron of arts

Names
- Jawaher bint Majid bin Abdulaziz bin Abdul Rahman bin Faisal
- House: Al Saud
- Father: Majid bin Abdulaziz Al Saud

Jawaher bint Majid Al Saud (Arabic: جواهر بنت ماجد آل سعود) is a Saudi royal who is the first Saudi woman to have been granted the title of the patron of arts in Saudi Arabia.

== Biography ==
Princess Jawaher is the daughter of Prince Majid, one of King Abdulaziz's sons. Her full siblings include Prince Mishaal, Prince Abdulaziz and Princess Basma who married Bandar bin Faisal, one of King Faisal's sons.

Princess Jawaher founded the Al Mansouria Foundation in 1999 which contributes to the creative arts through the exhibitions and publications. She is the president of the foundation which based in Paris. In 2013, she also founded the non-profit Saudi Art Council. Under her patronage several exhibitions of arts, design and architecture have been conducted.
