= Ministry of Housing (Saudi Arabia) =

Former government ministry of Saudi Arabia

Ministry overview
- Formed: March 25, 2011
- Dissolved: January 24, 2021
- Jurisdiction: Saudi Arabia
- Headquarters: Riyadh, Saudi Arabia
- Ministry executives: Shuwaish Al-Duwaihi, Minister (2011–2015); Majid Al-Hogail, Minister (2015–2021)
- Website: www.housing.gov.sa

The Ministry of Housing was a government ministry of Saudi Arabia established by royal decree on 25 March 2011 to oversee housing affairs. The ministry also promoted the development of housing products and supplying real estate. It was merged in 2021 into what is now the Ministry of Municipalities and Housing.

== History ==
The ministry was created by a royal decree issued on 25 March 2011, with Shuwaish Al-Duwaihi, then head of the General Housing Authority, named minister. The ministry took over the duties of the General Housing Authority, which had been set up in 2007, as well as the responsibility of controlling residential land.

The minister also chaired the board of the Real Estate Development Fund. A week prior to the decree, King Abdullah had allocated SR 250 billion for 500,000 homes.

Al-Duwaihi was replaced in March 2015, a day after King Salman pledged to speed up housing. By then, only part of the 500,000 homes had been built. Essam bin Saeed took over the duties as minister of state.

Majid Al-Hogail served as the ministry's final minister from July 2015 to January 2021.

On 24 January 2021, it was merged into the Ministry of Municipal and Rural Affairs, which was renamed the Ministry of Municipal, Rural Affairs and Housing. The successor ministry was renamed the Ministry of Municipalities and Housing in 2024.

== Programs ==
The ministry ran several housing programs, including Eskan (housing), which provided housing products to citizens who met the ministry's eligibility criteria. In February 2017, the Sakani program was launched. Later in the year, it allocated about 280,000 housing products, including 120,000 units. In 2018, the Sakani program aimed to allocate 300,000 housing and financing options to Saudi citizens. In April 2021, in order to increase the Saudi home ownership to 70% by 2030, the Sakani program launched new services on its application like electronic financing, approved contractor, and interactive maps.

In 2018, Housing Minister Majid Al-Hogail handed over a house built in 48 hours using precast technology to its owner. In March 2019, the minister said housing investment was expected to reach up to $21 billion that year.

== See also ==
- Ministries of Saudi Arabia
