= Waleed bin Ibrahim Al Ibrahim =

Saudi businessman (born 1962)

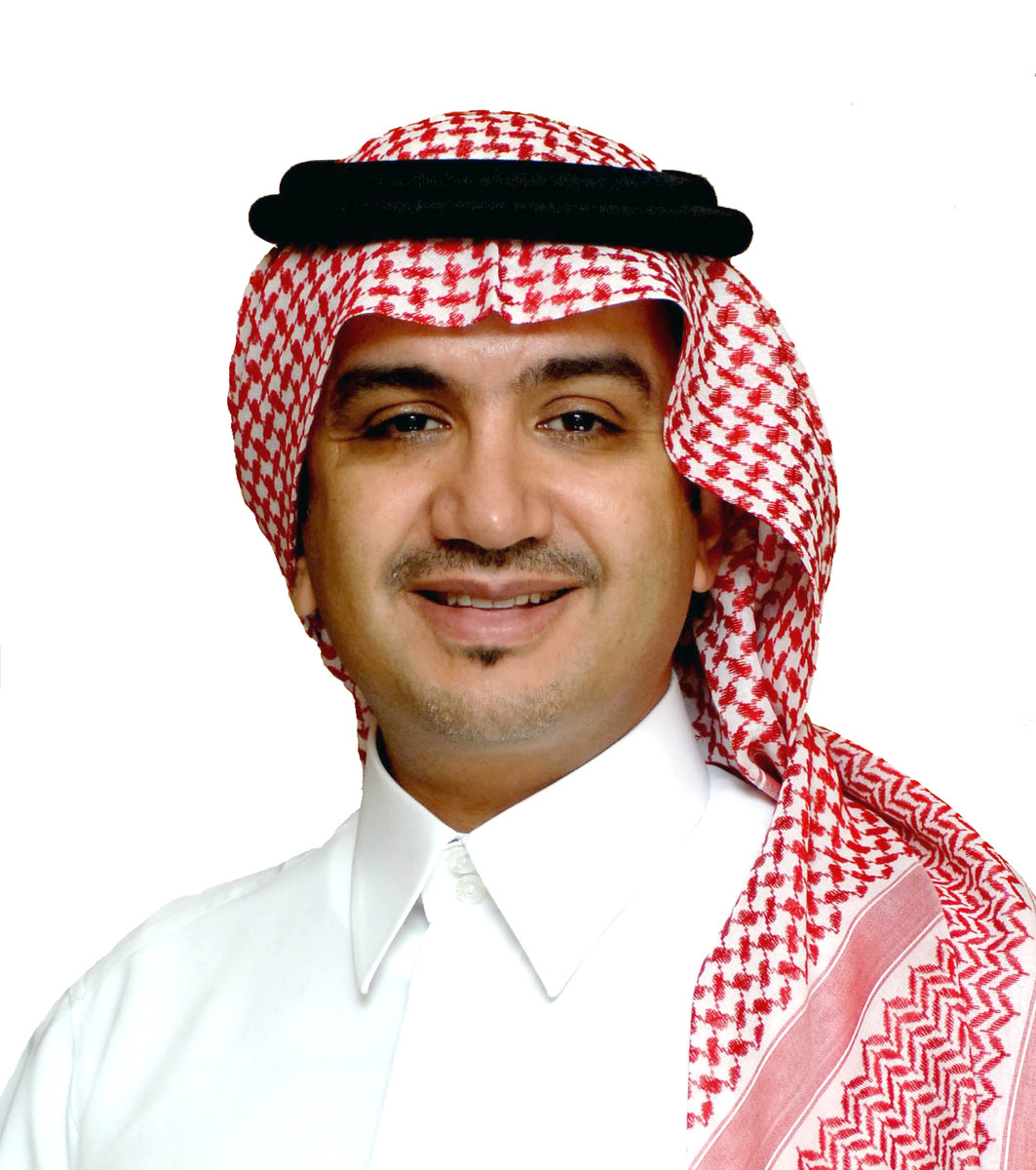
- Born: 1962 (age 63–64); Riyadh, Saudi Arabia
- Occupation: Chairman of Middle East Broadcasting Company (MBC)
- Years active: 1991 – present

Waleed bin Ibrahim Al Ibrahim (Arabic: وليد بن إبراهيم آل إبراهيم Walīd bin Ibrahīm Āl Ibrahīm) (born 1962) is a Saudi Arabian businessman, and founder and chairman of Middle East Broadcasting Center, known as MBC Group.

In 2018, the government of Saudi Arabia arranged to acquire 60 percent of MBC, leaving the remaining 40 per cent of the company in Al Ibrahim’s hands. MBC Group said in a statement that Al Ibrahim would retain his stake and had, in his capacity as chairman, reviewed growth plans during a meeting held in the United Arab Emirates on 29 May 2018.

The Saudi Arabian government's acquisition of the MBC stake came against the backdrop of a number of owners and board members of MBC being summoned in 2017 to Riyadh, where they were arrested, accused of corruption, and locked in the Ritz-Carlton. These moves came following years of the Saudi Crown Prince attempting to purchase the media company. After 83 days the company's chief owner Waleed al-Ibrahim was released. A "senior MBC executive" was cited by Arabian Business as stating that Waleed al-Ibrahim was found innocent of any wrongdoing.

== Early life and education ==
Waleed Al Ibrahim was born in 1962 and raised in Saudi Arabia. He has eight brothers. Two of his elder brothers, Abdulaziz and Khalid, are businessmen investing in real estate in the U.S. His sister, Al Jawhara Al Ibrahim, was one of at least thirteen wives of King Fahd. Another, Maha Al Ibrahim, married the former deputy minister of defence and aviation, Prince Abdul Rahman, full-brother of King Fahd. His third sister, Mohdi Al Ibrahim, is the spouse of the former Saudi minister of higher education, Khaled Al Angari.

Al Ibrahim received education in Oregon, USA, during the 1980s and completed his higher education there.

== Business activities ==
=== ARAvision ===
After completing his university education, Al Ibrahim founded the ARA Productions and Television Studios (ARAvision) in Saudi Arabia. It was his first enterprise in media. Later, it was called ARA Group International, becoming a media conglomerate that is made up of several radio and television companies airing the whole Arab world.

His company, ARAvision, was registered in Riyadh in 1995. The company was provided with an exclusive licence to deliver a wireless cable service to major cities in the Kingdom. Therefore, it was able to screen the satellite channels' content before being broadcast.

=== Middle East Broadcasting Company (MBC) ===
Al Ibrahim founded MBC in London in 1991 with the late entrepreneur, Saleh Kamel, launching the first independent Arabic satellite TV station. The company was established to express the views of Saudi royal family. It is part of the ARAvision. The MBC acquired United Press International in 1992 that was bankrupt at that time for $3.95 million to bolster its news-gathering scope.

Subsequently, the station introduced several movie and Arabic TV series channels including MBC 2, MBC 3 and MBC 4. Later, two more channels were launched. One of them is MBC Persia, broadcasting Hollywood films with Persian subtitles, and the other one is MBC Action, airing action movies. The MBC Bollywood was launched in 2013.

Al Ibrahim also launched Al Arabiya in February 2003 with the aim of providing an alternative to Al Jazeera. His goal for Al Arabiya was to position it as the CNN to Al Jazeera's Fox News. Through this position, Al Arabiya was thought to be a TV channel that is calm, cool, professional, providing objective reporting rather than for extremely emphasized opinions.

Although Al Ibrahim is widely known as the owner of the MBC, it is reported that fifty percent of the MBC profits were owned by King Fahd's youngest son and his nephew, Abdulaziz bin Fahd. It is further reported that Prince Abdulaziz dealt with both the profits and ideology of the MBC Channels, including Al Arabiya.

=== Others ===
In the 1990s Al Ibrahim was shareholder and board member of the United Press International (UPI). He served as the chairman of the UPI board until the early 1999.

=== Family investments ===
In 1990, the wealth of his brothers, Abdulaziz Al Ibrahim and Khalid Al Ibrahim, was reported to have been US$1.0 billion. It was argued that they made their wealth through being Boeing and Rolls-Royce representatives in Saudi deals. Their wealth was reported to have been US$1.2 billion in 1991. They had real estate investments in the US, including Marina del Rey in Los Angeles, a property near Disney World, and a hotel next to the Mayo Clinic. They also invested in Orlando real estate.

== Arrest and release ==
On 4 November 2017, Al Ibrahim was detained in Saudi Arabia in a corruption crackdown conducted by a new royal anti-corruption committee. Al Ibrahim was held at Riyadh’s Ritz-Carlton hotel.

Over the weekend of 26–27 January 2018, Al Ibrahim was released along with at least half a dozen other prominent Saudi businessmen detained in the probe, after being found innocent of any wrongdoing.

In May 2018, Saudi Arabian authorities allowed Al Ibrahim to leave the Kingdom for the first time since November 2017 to chair a strategy meeting at the headquarters of MBC Group in Dubai, United Arab Emirates. Al Ibrahim had been required to remain inside the Kingdom as the government finalised arrangements to take a controlling 60 percent stake in MBC.

Following the meeting, the MBC Group released a statement, with Al Ibrahim quoted as saying: “The coming stage shall witness MBC Group’s entry into new markets and sectors, in various fields, with the group shifting a greater focus towards Saudi Arabia and neighbouring regions, in line with the current transformational positive changes occurring in the Kingdom.”

== Awards ==
Al Ibrahim has been awarded for his contributions in the field of Arab media. He was among top 20 prominent Gulf businessmen according to Amwal magazine in 2005. He was chosen to be the 27th most influential Arab among 100 Arab personalities by Arabian Business in 2007. He was named the 'Media Man of the Year' at the 4th MENA Cristal Awards held in Lebanon in 2008. He also received other awards, including the "Knight" award from the Arab League in 2006 and "Innovator of the Year" award from Arabian Business. He was chosen as the first among top 50 figures in MENA’s media, marketing and advertising industry in 2011. He was named as the world's 66th most influential Arab personality by Gulf News in 2012, citing his prominent position in the Arab media. Arabian Business named him as the world's 24th most influential Arab among 500 others in 2012.

In May 2021, Al Ibrahim received the King Abdulaziz Order of Merit for his contribution to media and broadcasting in the Kingdom of Saudi Arabia which is considered the highest civilian honour in the country.

== Honours ==
- Grand Master of the Order of Independence (Jordan; 2016)

== Other positions ==
Waleed bin Ibrahim is a member of the advisory board of the Mohammed bin Rashid School for Communication (MBRSC) at the American University in Dubai (AUD).
