= Al-Adl cemetery =

Cemetery in Mecca, Saudi Arabia

- Interactive map of Al-Adl cemetery

Details
- Established: 1926; 100 years ago
- Location: Majid street, Mecca
- Country: Saudi Arabia
- Coordinates: 21.439°N 39.853°E
- Owned by: State
- Size: 50,000 m^{2} (540,000 sq ft)
- Find a Grave: Al-Adl cemetery

The Al-Adl cemetery (Arabic: مقبرة العدل, romanized: Maqbarat al-‘Adl, lit. 'Cemetery of Divine Justice') is one of the earliest and largest of the six cemeteries in Mecca, Saudi Arabia. It is the second substantial cemetery in the city.

== History and location ==
The graveyard was opened in 1926 and covers around 50,000 square metres. The cemetery is on Majed Street, near Masjid Al Haram. The cemetery is also near the headquarters of the Mecca governorate that is at east side.

== Burials ==
Many eminent Saudi royals were interred in the al-Adl cemetery, including Prince Nayef, Prince Mansour, Prince Mishari, Prince Majid, Prince Fawwaz, Prince Sattam, Prince Abdullah bin Faisal Al Saud, Prince Fahd bin Saud and Prince Saud bin Faisal.

In addition to Saudi royals, other senior figures, including Abdulaziz ibn Abdullah ibn Baaz and Muhammad ibn al-Uthaymeen, were buried in the graveyard. Additionally, the cemetery has been used for the burials of the imams of Masjid Al Haram.
