= Majid bin Abdulaziz Al Saud =

Saudi royal, businessman and government official (1938–2003)

Minister of Municipal and Rural Affairs
- In office: 1975–1980
- Predecessor: Office established
- Monarch: King Khalid

Governor of Makkah Region
- In office: 1980–1999
- Predecessor: Fawwaz bin Abdulaziz
- Successor: Abdulmajeed bin Abdulaziz
- Monarch: King Khalid
- Born: 19 October 1938; Riyadh
- Died: 13 April 2003 (aged 64); Jeddah
- Burial: 13 April 2003; Al Adl cemetery, Mecca
- Spouse: Nouf bint Abdallah bin Fahd Al Muhanna Aba Al Khail
Names
- Majid bin Abdulaziz bin Abdul Rahman bin Faisal Al Saud
- House: Al Saud
- Father: King Abdulaziz
- Mother: Muhdi

Majid bin Abdulaziz Al Saud (Arabic: ماجد بن عبد العزيز آل سعود; 19 October 1938 – 13 April 2003) was a Saudi royal and businessman who served as the governor of Mecca from 1980 to 1999.

== Early life and education ==
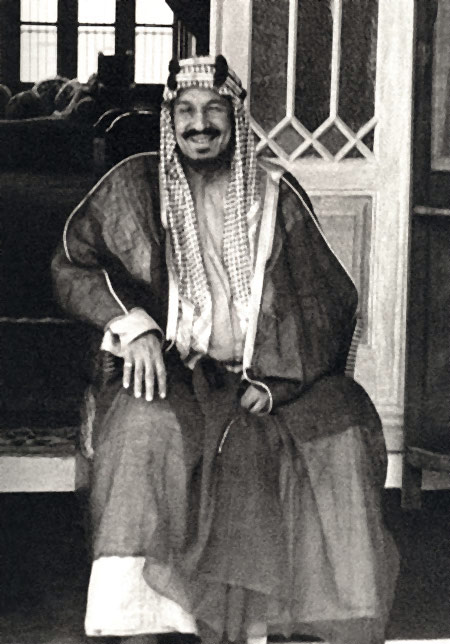
King Abdulaziz, Prince Majid's father

Majid bin Abdulaziz was born in Riyadh on 19 October 1938 to King Abdulaziz and Muhdi. His mother was an Armenian woman. He had a full brother, Sattam bin Abdulaziz, and two full sisters, Sultana bint Abdulaziz and Haya bint Abdulaziz. Prince Majid received formal education in Riyadh.

== Career ==
In 1960 Prince Majid began to involve in business. At the end of 1975, Majid bin Abdulaziz was appointed by King Khalid as minister of municipal and rural affairs, being the first minister. Prince Mutaib also joined the Saudi cabinet at that time, being appointed minister of public works and housing. These two appointments were a move to reduce the power of Sudairi Seven in the cabinet.

On 3 March 1980, Prince Majid was appointed governor of the Mecca Region, replacing Prince Fawwaz in the post. Prince Majid's tenure lasted for nineteen years ending in 1999 when he resigned from office as a result of a scandal involving one of his staff.

Prince Majid was one of the founders of the Dar Al Maal Al Islami Trust which was initiated by Mohammed bin Faisal Al Saud, King Faisal's son, in 1981.

=== Views and allegiances ===
In the early 1960s Prince Majid joined Free Princes Movement led by Prince Talal bin Abdulaziz. However, he left the group the same year.

In 1990 he argued that communism and other temporal ideologies were totally false and against human nature. Prince Majid was close to both then Crown Prince Abdullah and Sudairi Seven, acting as a floating voter in contests. However, during his tenure in Mecca governorship he was much closer to Crown Prince Abdullah.

== Personal life ==
Prince Majid married Nouf bint Abdallah bin Fahd Al Muhanna Aba Al Khail. He had seven children, two sons and five daughters. His eldest son, Mishaal bin Majid, is the governor of Jeddah city. Other son Abdulaziz bin Majid is the former governor of the Medina Region. One of his daughters, Princess Jawaher bint Majid, is the first Saudi woman to have been granted the title of the patron of arts in Saudi Arabia. Another daughter, Princess Basma bint Majid, married Prince Bandar bin Faisal Al Saud.

Prince Majid was fond of reading books on social history and culture and of learning foreign languages and learned English and French.

The Society of Majid bin Abdulaziz for Development and Social Services (Society) was founded in 1998 by Majid bin Abdulaziz. Its name was “Makkah Al Mukarramah Association for Development and Social Services” at the founding stage. Later, it was changed into “The Society of Majid bin Abdulaziz for Development and Social Services”, and was registered as a “charity” in the register of charities at the ministry of social affairs in 2000. Mishal bin Majid is the chairman of the society.

The Majid society was given by the Global Research Alliance (GRA) A+ rating for its achievements during 2011.

== Death and funeral ==
Prince Majid died in Jeddah after suffering from a prolonged illness on 13 April 2003. His funeral prayers were performed in Grand Mosque on the same day, and he was buried in Al Adl cemetery on Majed Street in Mecca. Crown Prince Abdullah, Prince Sultan, Prince Nayef, Prince Salman and other senior Saudi royals attended the funeral.

== Honours ==
- Grand Decoration of Honour in Gold with Sash (2nd Class) for Services to the Republic of Austria (2000).
- Knight Grand Cross of the Order of Isabella the Catholic (21 October 1977).
