= Majid Al-Hogail =

Minister of Housing of Saudi Arabia

His Excellency Majid Al-Hogail
- ماجد الحقيل
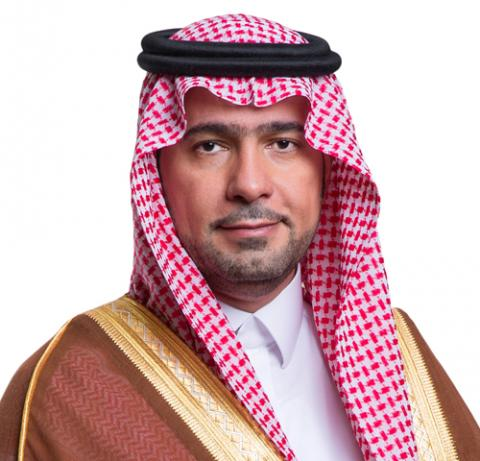
- Al-Hogail in 2020
- Education: University of Illinois Urbana-Champaign
- Title: Chairman of the Real Estate General Authority
- Term: 2017 - Present

Majid bin Abdullah Al-Hogail (Arabic: ماجد الحقيل) is the Minister of Municipalities and Housing of Saudi Arabia. He was appointed as the Minister of Housing in July 2015. In addition, he was also the acting Minister of Municipal and Rural Affairs since 25 February 2020, before the ministry merged with the Ministry of Housing. Al-Hogail has also been serving as the chairman of the Real Estate General Authority since January 2017.

== Education ==
In 1998, Al-Hogail gained a master's degree in business administration from the University of Illinois Urbana-Champaign in the USA, where in 2007, he completed an extended development program in management from Switzerland.

== Career ==
Al-Hogail previously served in several companies in the private sector. As from 2007 was the managing director of the RAFAL, a Real Estate Development company. Then in 2014, he was chosen as a chairmen of the Aljazira Capital. In 2015, he was a board member of budget airline Flynas.

Currently, Al-Hogail is a board member in Qiddiya and NEOM megaprojects.
