= Ministry of War (Saudi Arabia) =

The Ministry of War (also commonly translated as the "Military Ministry" (Arabic: وزارة الحربية) or Board) was created 1744 to unify the Saudi Arabian Armed Forces under one administrative structure. In 1933 it was renamed as the "Defense Agency" under the Ministry of Finance and headed by a Director-General. A few years later, the Agency was renamed as the Ministry of Defense.

== Ministers ==
No.	Portrait	Name (Birth–Death)	Tenure
1		Abdulaziz bin Muhammad (1720–1803)	1745–1765
2		Abdullah bin Muhammad (1725–1812)	1765–1773
3		Saud al-Kabeer (1748–1814)	1773–1803
4		Abdullah bin Saud (died 1819)	1803–1814
5		Mishari bin Saud	1814–1816
6		Faisal bin Saud	1816–1818
7		Turki bin Abdullah (1755–1834)	1819–1828
8		Faisal bin Turki (1785–1865)	1828–1838
9		Khalid bin Saud	1838–1841
10		Abdullah bin Thunayan	1841–1843
11		Abdullah al-Faisal	1843–1845
12		Galloway bin Turki	1845–1850
13		Saud al-Faisal	1850–1868
14		Muhammad al-Faisal	1868–1875
15		Abdul Rahman bin Faisal (1850–1928)	1875–1886
16		Faisal bin Abdul Rahman	1886–1889
17		Khalid bin Abdul Rahman	1889–1891
18		Fahd bin Abdul Rahman	1891–1901
19		Abdulaziz bin Abdul Rahman (1877–1953)	1901–1921
20		Muhammad bin Abdul Rahman (c. 1877–1943)	1921–1933

== See also ==
- Ministry of Defense
- General Staff Presidency
