= Governor of Mecca =

Head of the Saudi Region of Makkah

- أمير منطقة مكة المكرمة
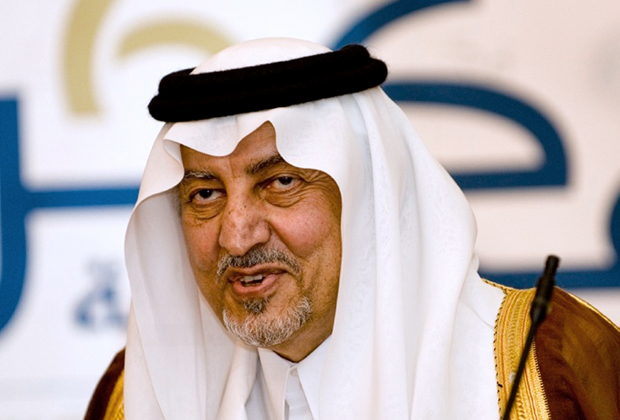
- Incumbent; Khalid Al-Faisal since January 29, 2015
- Style: Governor (informal); His Highness (formal)
- Type: Head of government
- Member of: The Royal Commission for Mecca City and Holy Sites
- Reports to: King of Saudi Arabia
- Seat: Mecca City
- Appointer: The King or Crown Prince on behalf of the King
- Term length: At The King's pleasure
- Precursor: King of the Kingdom of Hejaz
- Formation: 1925 (101 years ago)
- First holder: Faisal bin Abdulaziz

The Governor of Mecca, officially the Emir of Mecca, is the head of government of Mecca Province and represents the King of Saudi Arabia in the province. The governor is the highest-ranking official in Mecca Province and holds broad authority over its administration, security, and development. The officeholder supervises the work of the Holy Mecca Municipality and also serves as a member of the Board of Directors of the Royal Commission for Mecca City and Holy Sites.

== History ==
In 1916, while the Ottoman Empire was still engaged in World War I, the Arab Revolt was launched against Ottoman rule in the Arabian Peninsula. As a result of the revolt, Hussein bin Ali of the Hashemite dynasty proclaimed the Kingdom of Hejaz, ending centuries of Ottoman authority in the region.

The kingdom was internationally recognized in 1920, but its independence was short-lived. From 1924 to 1925, it was conquered by the Third Saudi State during the Saudi conquest of Hejaz, leading to the exile of the Hashemite dynasty to Cyprus.

Following the annexation, Abdulaziz Ibn Saud unified Hejaz with his Najdi domains, creating the Kingdom of Hejaz and Nejd in 1927 as a dual monarchy under his leadership.

During this period, Faisal bin Abdulaziz, who would later become king, served as Viceroy of Hejaz, an administrative role that eventually evolved into the modern office of the Governor of Mecca.

In 1932, the Kingdom of Hejaz and Nejd was officially unified and renamed the Kingdom of Saudi Arabia.

== Functions of the Governor ==
- Representing the authority of the Custodian of the Two Holy Mosques in the province.
- Ensure the Justice to the citizens of the province.
- Works to maintain security in the province.
- Provides the all services to the citizens of the province.
- Work on the development of the province.
- Appoints the important officials of the provincial authority including the Deputy Governor
- Ensure the effectiveness of law and order in the province.

== List of governors of Mecca Province ==
The following is a list of individuals who have held the office of Governor of Mecca Province since 1925:

#	Portrait	Governor (Birth–Death)	Term of office		Country
1		Faisal bin Abdulaziz (1906–1975)	1925	1932	Kingdom of Hejaz and Nejd
1		Faisal bin Abdulaziz (1906–1975)	7 years		Unification
2		Faisal bin Abdulaziz (1906–1975)	1932	1958	Kingdom of Saudi Arabia
2		Faisal bin Abdulaziz (1906–1975)	26 years		Kingdom of Saudi Arabia
3		Mutaib bin Abdulaziz (1931–2019)	1958	1961	Kingdom of Saudi Arabia
3		Mutaib bin Abdulaziz (1931–2019)	3 years		Kingdom of Saudi Arabia
4		Abdullah bin Saud (1934–1997)	1961	1963	Kingdom of Saudi Arabia
4		Abdullah bin Saud (1934–1997)	2 years		Kingdom of Saudi Arabia
5		Mishaal bin Abdulaziz (1926–2017)	1963	1971	Kingdom of Saudi Arabia
5		Mishaal bin Abdulaziz (1926–2017)	8 years		Kingdom of Saudi Arabia
6		Fawwaz bin Abdulaziz (1934–2008)	1971	1980	Kingdom of Saudi Arabia
6		Fawwaz bin Abdulaziz (1934–2008)	9 years		Kingdom of Saudi Arabia
7		Majid bin Abdulaziz (1938–2003)	1980	1999	Kingdom of Saudi Arabia
7		Majid bin Abdulaziz (1938–2003)	19 years		Kingdom of Saudi Arabia
8		Abdul Majeed bin Abdulaziz (1942–2007)	1999	5 May 2007	Kingdom of Saudi Arabia
8		Abdul Majeed bin Abdulaziz (1942–2007)	8 years		Kingdom of Saudi Arabia
9		Khalid Al-Faisal (b.1940)	16 May 2007	22 December 2013	Kingdom of Saudi Arabia
9		Khalid Al-Faisal (b.1940)	6 years, 220 days		Kingdom of Saudi Arabia
10		Mishaal bin Abdullah (b.1970)	22 December 2013	29 January 2015	Kingdom of Saudi Arabia
10		Mishaal bin Abdullah (b.1970)	1 year, 38 days		Kingdom of Saudi Arabia
11		Khalid Al-Faisal (b.1940)	29 January 2015	Incumbent	Kingdom of Saudi Arabia
11		Khalid Al-Faisal (b.1940)	ongoing		Kingdom of Saudi Arabia

== See also ==
- Mecca Province
- Provinces of Saudi Arabia
