= Ministry of Defense (Saudi Arabia) =

Government ministry of Saudi Arabia

- وزارة الدفاع

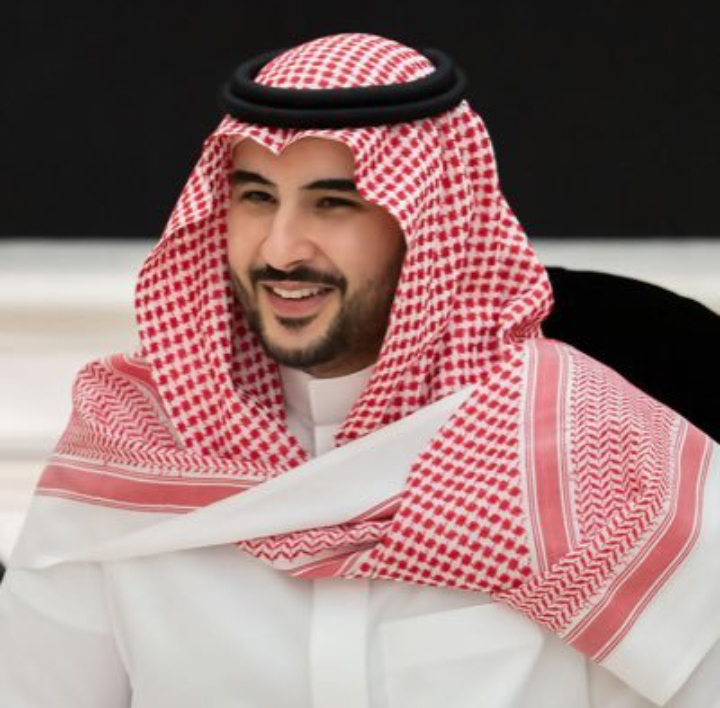
- Khalid bin Salman, the current Minister of Defense since 27 September 2022

Agency overview
- Formed: 10 November 1943; 82 years ago
- Preceding agencies: Ministry of War (1744–1933); Defense Agency (1934–1943)
- Jurisdiction: Government of Saudi Arabia
- Headquarters: Riyadh
- Minister responsible: Khalid bin Salman
- Website: Official English Site

The Ministry of Defense (Arabic: وزارة الدفاع) is a government ministry in Saudi Arabia responsible for protecting the country’s national security and sovereignty against external threats. It oversees the Saudi Arabian Armed Forces and all of their service branches.

== History ==
The roots of Saudi Arabia's military administration can be traced back to the Ministry of War, which existed from 1744 to 1933, overseeing military affairs during the periods of the First Saudi state and Second Saudi state.

In 1929, a royal order by King Abdulaziz, the founder of the Third Saudi state, created the Military Affairs Administration to address military issues and build a strong army. The army was organized into three units: machine gun, infantry, and artillery units.

In 1934, the Defense Agency was established by King Abdulaziz's order to meet the needs of expansion and modernization. Additional detachments were created and distributed across cities and seaports of the country. Five years later, in 1939, the General Staff Presidency was established, replacing the Military Affairs Administration.

The Ministry of Defense was formally created in 1943, replacing the Defense Agency. In 1952, it was renamed the Ministry of Defense and Aviation. In 2011, the ministry reverted to the name Ministry of Defense.

By 2017, Saudi Arabia had become one of the world's leading military powers. It ranked third globally in military spending and was the largest military spender in the Middle East and North Africa. With an allocated budget of $69.4 billion, representing 10% of the country's gross domestic product (GDP), Saudi Arabia surpassed Russia, which ranked fourth in military spending, according to the Stockholm International Peace Research Institute (SIPRI). SIPRI also noted that Saudi Arabia possesses the most modern and well-equipped military in the Persian Gulf region.

== List of ministers ==
No.	Portrait	Minister	Took office	Left office	Time in office
1		Mansour bin Abdulaziz	22 October 1943	1 May 1951	7 years, 191 days
2		Mishaal bin Abdulaziz	12 May 1951	26 December 1956	5 years, 228 days
3		Fahd bin Saud	26 December 1956	21 December 1960	3 years, 361 days
4		Muhammed bin Saud	22 December 1960	21 October 1963	2 years, 303 days
5		Sultan bin Abdulaziz	1 November 1963	22 October 2011	47 years, 355 days
6		Salman bin Abdulaziz	5 November 2011	23 January 2015	3 years, 79 days
7		Mohammed bin Salman	23 January 2015	27 September 2022	7 years, 247 days
8		Khalid bin Salman	27 September 2022	Incumbent	3 years, 284 days

== See also ==
- Ministry of War
- Ministries of Saudi Arabia
- Chairman of the General Staff
