= Mishaal bin Abdulaziz Al Saud =

Saudi royal, businessman and politician (1925–2017)

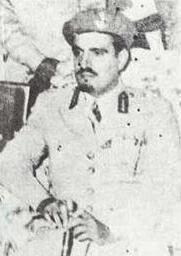

Chairman of the Allegiance Council
- Tenure: 2007–2017
- Monarch: Abdullah; Salman

Governor of Makkah Province
- Tenure: 1963–1971
- Appointed by: King Saud
- Predecessor: Abdullah bin Saud bin Abdulaziz
- Successor: Fawwaz bin Abdulaziz

Minister of Defense
- Tenure: 1951–1953
- Monarch: Abdulaziz; Saud
- Prime Minister: King Saud (1953)
- Predecessor: Mansour bin Abdulaziz
- Successor: Fahd bin Saud
- Born: 5 September 1925; Riyadh, Kingdom of Hejaz and Nejd
- Died: 3 May 2017 (aged 91); Riyadh, Saudi Arabia
Names
- Mishaal bin Abdulaziz bin Abdul Rahman Al Saud
- House: Al Saud
- Father: King Abdulaziz
- Mother: Shahida
- Occupation: Government official; businessman

Mishaal bin Abdulaziz Al Saud (Arabic: مشعل بن عبد العزيز آل سعود, romanized: Misha`al bin `Abd al `Azīz as Saʻūd; 5 September 1925 – 3 May 2017) was a Saudi Arabian politician and businessman. A member of the House of Saud, he held different cabinet posts in the 1950s and was the chairman of the Allegiance Council from 2007 to 2017.

== Early life ==
Prince Mishaal was born on 5 September 1925. He was the fifteenth son of King Abdulaziz.

He was the full brother of Prince Mansour, Prince Mutaib and Princess Qumash who died on 26 September 2011. Their mother was an Armenian woman from Lebanon, Shahida, (died 1938), who reportedly was the favorite wife of King Abdulaziz. She was of Christian origin.

== Career ==
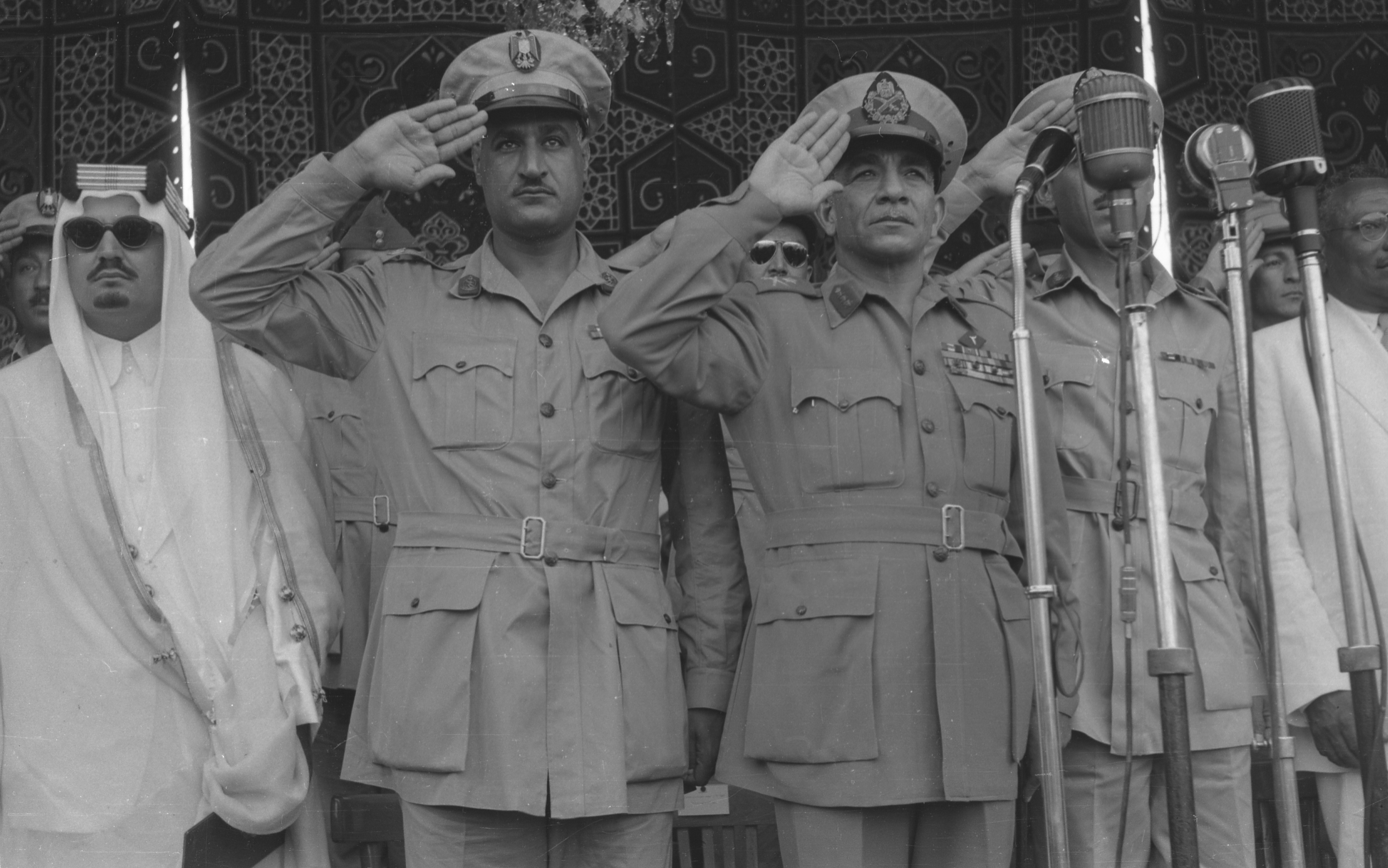
Saudi Defense Minister Prince Mishaal (left) next to Gamal Abdel Nasser and Mohamed Naguib in the opening ceremony of Suez Channel following the 1952 military coup

Prince Mishaal served as the minister of defense from 12 May 1951 to 1953. He replaced his full brother Prince Mansour as minister of defense when he died in 1951. Until that date, Prince Mishaal served as deputy minister of defense. When Prince Mishaal became minister, his younger full brother Prince Mutaib was appointed his deputy. As minister of defense, Prince Mishaal became one of the most affluent princes in the Al Saud family. He bought state land for very cheap prices and yielded extraordinary profits. But because of his lack of education and experience, Prince Mishaal let the ministry remain completely unorganized. He leaned heavily on advice and recommendation from foreign counsel. He wielded significant influence in King Abdulaziz's government. Because of Mishaal's considerable power, King Abdulaziz countered his influence by appointing Abdullah bin Faisal as minister of health and interior.

At the same time, King Abdulaziz established the ministry of air force under Prince Mishaal to prevent flight-related matters from going under Prince Talal, the minister of communication. Since Mishaal and Talal could not agree, Saudi Arabia was to have two airline fleets. But in April 1955, Prince Talal resigned from the office, and the ministry of communication was merged with the ministry of finance. In May 1955, King Saud created a renewed modern National Guard which was led by Saud's son Prince Khalid who replaced a commoner. This move weakened Prince Mishaal due to the fact that he had often used the old National Guard's resources.

Prince Mishaal's tenure as minister of defense ended in 1956 when he was dismissed by King Saud because of his alleged pro-Nasserist views and corruption claims. Prince Fahd bin Saud, a son of King Saud, replaced him in the post. In 1957 Prince Mishaal was made a member of the council of the minister as an advisor to King Saud.

Mishaal and his full-brother Mutaib returned to favour in 1963 under regent and later King Faisal who entrusted them a key governorship and deputy governorship, respectively. Specifically, Mishaal served as governor of Makkah Province from 1963 to 1971. In 1969 Prince Mishaal was also made the head of the Saudi Tourism Authority. Both Mishaal and Mutaib resigned from their posts in 1971 for reasons that are not entirely clear.

Prince Mishaal was appointed chairman of the Allegiance Council on 10 December 2007.

=== Succession to the throne ===
Mishaal bin Abdulaziz protested more than once that he should have been crown prince since he served as both a governor and a minister and was older than some of his brothers. It is argued that he was immediately excluded from the competition for the title of crown prince by the Sudairi brothers. One of the reasons for his exclusion was his low-level relations with tribes.

=== Influence ===
Mishaal bin Abdulaziz was impartial in family politics, although he was known to incline towards King Abdallah or be one of King Abdullah's close allies. His neutral stance made him the perfect choice to be the chairman of the Allegiance Council. This role was considered to be a significant position, giving him influence in the decision-making process in regard to succession.

== Business activities ==
Mishaal bin Abdulaziz was a leading businessman, with substantial investments in real estate, insurance, electrical utilities, oil trading and cement manufacture. He was chairman of the board of Yanbu Cement company, established in 1976.

He founded Al Shoula Group in 1970, which is a major investor in real estate developments throughout the Middle East partnering with such investors as Dubai's Emaar Group, Kuwait's Bayt Al Mal Investment Company, and the Al Rajhi family's Tameer Group. Al Shoula's wholly owned subsidiary, Dhahran Global, is active in broad areas of the petroleum and petrochemical industry including pipeline development, oil and gas production, oilfield services and international product trading. The CEO of Al Shoula Group was his son Prince Abdulaziz who was appointed to the post in the late 1990s.

Prince Mishaal was one of the founders of the Dar Al Maal Al Islami Trust which was initiated by Mohammed bin Faisal Al Saud, King Faisal's son, in 1981. He was also the owner of Shola Shopping Center in Riyadh and the Mishaal International company.

=== Charity ===
In the early 1970s Prince Mishaal allocated land in Mecca for the foundation of charities which would assist Palestinian families whose children had been killed during the operations against Israel.

=== Controversy ===
In 2013 Faisal Almhairat, a Jordanian businessman and Prince Mishaal's former business partner, alleged that Prince Mishaal and his son, Prince Abdulaziz, involved in money laundering activity for various rich individuals and groups, including Hizbollah, and opened a case in London.

== Personal life ==
Mishaal bin Abdulaziz was a supporter of the traditional camel racing and horse racing, and had valuable racing camels and horses. Each year, he patronized camel races in the kingdom. He also dealt with traditional falconry.

One of his wives was Noura bint Fawwaz, a granddaughter of Nuri Al Shalaan, and they divorced. Prince Mishaal's son, Mohammed bin Mishaal, died at age 58 in February 2005. His other sons include Prince Faisal, Prince Mansour and Prince Bandar. Prince Faisal is the son-in-law of former Crown Prince Sultan, and his spouse is Princess Latifa. Abdulaziz bin Fahd married Al Anoud bint Faisal in December 2010.

In October 2009 Mishaal bin Abdulaziz was rushed to hospital in Geneva, apparently having suffered a stroke. Then, he returned to Saudi Arabia from unspecified medical treatment in Beirut in December 2009. Mishaal died on 3 May 2017 at the age of 90 according to the Saudi Press Agency.

== Ancestry ==
Ancestors of Mishaal bin Abdulaziz Al Saud

16. Turki bin Abdullah bin Muhammad
8. Faisal bin Turki bin Abdullah Al Saud
17. Hia bint Hamad bin Ali Al Faqih Angari Tamimi
4. Abdul Rahman bin Faisal
18. Mishari bin Abdulrahman bin Hassan Al Saud
9. Sara bint Mishari bin Abdulrahman bin Hassan Al Saud
2. Abdulaziz ibn Saud
20. Mohammed bin Turki bin Suleiman Al Sudairi
10. Ahmed Al Kabir bin Mohammed bin Turki Al Sudairi
5. Sara bint Ahmed Al Sudairi
1. Mishaal bin Abdulaziz Al Saud
3. Shahida
