= Qumash bint Abdulaziz Al Saud =

Saudi royal (1927–2011)

- Born: 1927
- Died: 26 September 2011 (aged 83–84)
- Spouse: Faisal bin Saad bin Abdul Rahman Al Saud
Names
- Qumash bint Abdulaziz bin Abdul Rahman Al Saud
- House: Al Saud
- Father: King Abdulaziz
- Mother: Shahida

Qumash bint Abdulaziz Al Saud (Arabic: قماش بنت عبدالعزيز آل سعود; 1927 – 26 September 2011) was a member of the Saudi royal family. She was one of the children of King Abdulaziz and Shahida, an Armenian woman from Lebanon. Her mother was of Christian origin and died in 1938. Qumash was the full sister of Prince Mansour, Prince Mishaal and Prince Mutaib.

Qumash bint Abdulaziz married Prince Faisal, a son of her father's full brother Saad bin Abdul Rahman. She died on 26 September 2011. Funeral prayers for her were performed at Imam Turki bin Abdullah Mosque in Riyadh after Asr prayer.
