= Mansour bin Abdulaziz Al Saud =

Saudi royal and politician (1921–1951)

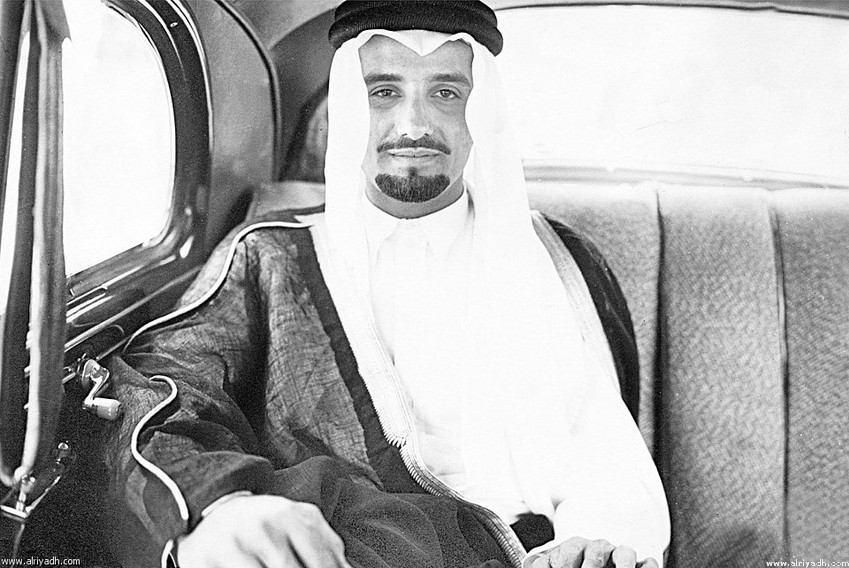
- Prince Mansour in 1944

Minister of Defense and Aviation
- In office: 10 November 1943 – 2 May 1951
- Predecessor: Office established
- Successor: Mishaal bin Abdulaziz
- Monarch: Abdulaziz
- Born: 1921; Riyadh, Emirate of Nejd and Hasa
- Died: 2 May 1951 (aged 29–30); Paris, France
- Burial: Al Adl cemetery, Mecca
- Issue: List: Prince Talal; Princess Mudhi
Names
- Mansour bin Abdulaziz bin Abdul Rahman bin Faisal Al Saud
- House: Al Saud
- Father: King Abdulaziz
- Mother: Shahida

Mansour bin Abdulaziz Al Saud (Arabic: منصور بن عبد العزيز آل سعود Manṣūr ibn ‘Abdul‘azīz Āl Su‘ūd; 1921 – 2 May 1951) was a Saudi royal and politician who served as the defense minister of Saudi Arabia between 1943 and 1951. During his lifetime Prince Mansour was the third most powerful son of King Abdulaziz after Prince Faisal and Crown Prince Saud.

== Early life and education ==
Prince Mansour was born in Qasr Al Hukm, Riyadh, in 1921. He is widely believed to be the ninth son of King Abdulaziz, but William A. Eddy argues that Prince Mansour is the sixth son of Abdulaziz. His mother was an Armenian woman from Lebanon, Shahida (died 1938), who was reportedly the favorite wife of King Abdulaziz. She was of Christian origin. Prince Mansour's full siblings were Prince Mishaal, Prince Mutaib, and Princess Qumash.

At age seven Prince Mansour's education began with a private tutor, and he studied Quran and Arabic. Then he was sent to the Saudi Institute in Mecca for further education where he received high school-level education on religion, mathematics and geography.

== Career and activities ==
Prince Mansour's first government post was the supervision of the royal palaces in Riyadh which he was appointed in 1938. In 1940 he was made minister of war. In 1942 he participated in King Abdulaziz's meeting with the British ambassador in Riyadh. Prince Mansour was also the emir of Murabba Palace in 1943. He officially visited Cairo when King Abdulaziz sent him there to support the Indian Muslim officers and men just before the Battle of El Alamein. Prince Mansour also acted as an aide to Prince Faisal during the latter's post of viceroy of Hijaz.

Then Prince Mansour was appointed minister of defense and aviation by King Abdulaziz on 10 November 1943 when the office was established which had been titled as the ministry of war since 1940. Therefore, he is the first defense minister of Saudi Arabia.

In December 1944 Prince Mansour visited Khartoum where Saudi army personnel were trained in driving and maintenance. He and King's another son, Muhammad, accompanied their father in his meetings with the US President Franklin D. Roosevelt on 14 February 1945 and British Prime Minister Winston Churchill in Egypt on 17 February 1945.

Prince Mansour asked the British to reorganize the Saudi armed forces in November 1944. As a result of this request the first Saudi military personnel were sent to the United Kingdom to receive aviation training at several institutions, including the Training University Air Service, near Southampton, and the Academy of Aviation in Perth, Scotland. Prince Mansour visited the latter group. He also officially visited both the United Kingdom and the United States as a guest of these governments, and his visits were concerned with arms deals.

Prince Mansour also headed the Saudi Arabian Airlines when he was serving as defense minister. His term as defense minister lasted until his death in 1951, and he was replaced by his full brother Prince Mishaal who had been his deputy at the ministry.

== Personal life ==
Prince Mansour was married and had two children, Talal and Muhdi. Prince Talal (1950—2023) was raised by his uncle Prince Mutaib following the death of his father. Prince Mutaib's daughter, Princess Nouf, married Prince Talal who became a member of Allegiance Council in December 2007. Prince Mansour's daughter, Mudhi, published a book entitled Al Hijar Wa Natayjiha Fi 'Asir Al Malik 'Abdul'Aziz in 1993.

Unlike his siblings Prince Mansour was fond of automobiles and machines and spent most of his time in the Royal garage in Riyadh.

== Death ==
Prince Mansour had some health issues and went to India for treatment in June 1943. Prince Muhammad and Abdullah Suleiman, his father's advisor, accompanied him in this visit. He also visited Palestine for health issues in October and in November 1943.

Prince Mansour died of a heart attack in Paris on 2 May 1951. Concerning the cause of Prince Mansour's death there are two other reports arguing that he died of kidney disease. Prince Mansour was buried in Al Adl cemetery in Mecca.
