= Abdulaziz bin Fahd Al Saud =

Saudi royal and former government official

- Born: Riyadh, Saudi Arabia
- Spouse: Al Anoud bint Faisal bin Mishaal Al Saud
Names
- Abdulaziz bin Fahd bin Abdulaziz Al Saud
- House: Al Saud
- Father: King Fahd
- Mother: Al Jawhara Al Ibrahim
- Education: King Saud University

Abdulaziz bin Fahd Al Saud (Arabic: عبد العزيز بن فهد آل سعود ʿAbd al-ʿAzīz bin Fahd Āl Suʿūd) is a Saudi prince, a son of former King Fahd, and one of the grandsons of Saudi Arabia's founder King Abdulaziz.

== Early life and education ==
His mother Al Jawhara bint Ibrahim Al Ibrahim belongs to the wealthy Al Ibrahim family.

Abdulaziz bin Fahd received a bachelor of arts degree in administrative sciences from King Saud University.

== Professional experience ==
Prince Abdulaziz was first appointed as minister of state without portfolio in May 1998. Then, he was made head of the Office of the Council of Ministers in January 2000, when he was 28 years old. It was reported that after King Fahd's death, he began to live in Switzerland and came to Saudi Arabia to participate in the meetings of the Council of Ministers.

On 26 June 2011, he was relieved from his position as head of the court of Cabinet affairs by a royal decree. It was declared that he resigned from his posts of minister of State and member of the Council of Ministers at his own request in June 2011.

== Business activities ==
His ties with Saudi Oger were well known in Saudi Arabia. The company was founded by Rafik Hariri, who built Saudi Oger into a large company with the assistance of King Fahd. Hariri said 'The meat on my shoulder is from King Fahd,’ according to As'ad Abu Khalil, a professor of political science at California State University Stanislaus, who has written several books and runs the blog The Angry Arab News Service. Hariri, also a former prime minister of Lebanon, was assassinated in 2005. His son, Saad Hariri, took over Saudi Oger and became Lebanon’s prime minister for 14 months before he was ousted in 2011. Saad Hariri and Prince Abdulaziz are known to be close.

Abdulaziz bin Fahd owned fifty per cent of the MBC, of which the remainder is owned by his maternal uncle Waleed bin Ibrahim al Ibrahim. It is reported that Prince Abdulaziz dealt with both the profits and the ideology of MBC Channels, including al Arabiya.

It emerged in a New York Supreme Court affidavit that he was the secret owner of a $1 billion property portfolio in the US which owns the American headquarters of the oil giant BP and the defence contractor BAE Systems. In January 2002, The Daily Telegraph newspaper valued the portfolio at £4 billion. The affidavit, which was subsequently partially sealed by the judge but had already become available on internet blogs, stated that the properties were being managed by a group which included Sheikh Majid Al Ibrahim, the prince’s maternal uncle, and that total control of the portfolio was ultimately seized by Interventure Capital Group and Interventure Advisers, both of Manhattan, New York. According to a press release issued by Hyatt Hotels Corporation, Interventure Capital Group is run by Jaber Al Ibrahim and is an adviser to Naseel Holding Company, the Al Ibrahim family investment vehicle chaired by Sheikh Majid Al Ibrahim.

According to a report in The Daily Telegraph in October 2010, Interventure Capital Group is also behind another major portfolio of properties which had been controlled by a UK-based company, StratREAL. Assets purchased by StratREAL on behalf of Prince Abdulaziz bin Fahd included Fifth Street Towers, a Minneapolis office complex, for $294 million in 2007. In May 2012, following a foreclosure on the complex for mortgage default, Fifth Street Towers was sold at a sheriff's auction for $1 over the outstanding debt of $110 million.

The Times reported in July 2013 that Abdulaziz was offering to sell for £100 million his mansion at 5 Palace Green, on London's Kensington Palace Gardens (nicknamed "Billionaires' Row").

== Alliances ==
Abdulaziz bin Fahd was previously one of King Abdullah's closest aides. However, later, he seemed to have had a falling out with the monarch and to have been close to his uncle, the late Crown Prince Nayef.

== Fortune ==
Abdulaziz received exactly half of all profits of the successful Middle East Broadcasting Corporation (MBC). He had a number of palaces in Saudi Arabia and around various other parts of the world which have cost over $2 billion which include:

- London Mansion on the Billionaire's row in Kensington, now for sale at £100 million.
- A very large private stately residential complex with the replica of Alhambra and several other famous forts set within well maintained splendid gardens covering an area of 134 acres in the exclusive area overlooking Wadi Hanifa in Riyadh. 24.645808°N 46.643202°E
- Massive farm near Janadriya covering an area of 715 acres or about 2.89 square kilometers at the northern outskirts of Riyadh. Satellite photos reveal large swimming pools, luxury tents and its own water and sewage treatment facility set within a large date farm.25.138224°N 46.79251°E
- In Jeddah he has several palaces with private yacht berths and each palace has more than twenty guest houses .

In addition, he reportedly owned "the Pyramid House" on Hillcrest Road in Beverly Hills, California.

== Personal life ==
Abdulaziz bin Fahd married Al Anoud bint Faisal Al Saud in December 2010. His wife is a granddaughter of the late Sultan bin Abdulaziz and of Mishaal bin Abdulaziz.

He dealt with camel racing in Saudi Arabia. His camels won the race organized in the Janadriyah festival in 2011.

The Prince owns a Boeing 777, a Boeing 737 Business Jet and a Canadair Challenger which he uses frequently for pleasure travel.

== 2017 purge ==
Before Abdulaziz was himself purged, he was used in the kidnapping of Sultan bin Turki II bin Abdulaziz Al Saud.

== Fate ==
The fate of Prince Abdulaziz bin Fahd is uncertain. There were rumours that Abdulaziz, age 46, was killed by a death squad while resisting arrest, but the Saudi information ministry released a statement saying that the prince was "alive and well." In November 2018, Prince Nawaf bin Faisal tweeted a video showing that Abdulaziz bin Fahd is still alive.
