= Fawwaz bin Abdulaziz Al Saud =

Saudi royal, businessman and government official (1934–2008)

Governor of Makkah Region
- Tenure: 1971–1980
- Predecessor: Mishaal bin Abdulaziz
- Successor: Majid bin Abdulaziz
- Monarch: Faisal; Khalid

Governor of Riyadh Province
- Tenure: 1960–1961
- Predecessor: Salman bin Abdulaziz
- Successor: Badr bin Saud
- Monarch: Saud
- Born: 1934; Taif
- Died: 19 July 2008 (aged 73–74); Paris
- Burial: 22 July 2008; Al Adl cemetery, Mecca
- Spouse: Fawzia bint Hussain Izzat
- House: Al Saud
- Father: Abdulaziz of Saudi Arabia
- Mother: Bazza II

Fawwaz bin Abdulaziz Al Saud (Arabic: فواز بن عبد العزيز آل سعود, Fawwāz bin ʿAbdulʿazīz Āl Saʿūd; 1934 – 22 July 2008) was a senior member of the House of Saud. In 2006, Fawwaz became one of the members of the Allegiance Commission. However, he died on 19 July 2008, some six months after the establishment of the council.

== Early life and education ==
Prince Fawwaz was born in Taif in 1934. He was the son of King Abdulaziz and Bazza II (died 1940), a Moroccan woman. He was the 24th son of King Abdulaziz. His only full brother was Prince Bandar bin Abdulaziz. Fawwaz received his early education at the Princes' School in Riyadh.

== Career ==
Prince Fawwaz was governor of Riyadh from 1960 to 1961. On 18 June 1969, he was appointed deputy governor of Makkah Province. Then, he served as governor of the province from 1971 to 1980. He was the governor when the Grand Mosque Seizure occurred. After this event, he was removed from office over corruption allegations by the group which seized the mosque. According to another report, Fawwaz resigned from office following the incident, citing health problems.

== Free Princes Movement ==
Prince Fawwaz, together with Prince Talal and Prince Badr, was a member of the Free Princes Movement from 1962 to February 1964. He defected to the United Arab Republic with his half-brothers Badr and Abdul Muhsin and their cousin Fahd bin Saad, but they returned to Saudi Arabia upon their rehabilitation by Crown Prince Faisal on 22 January 1964. Upon their return they published a statement acknowledging their mistake in criticizing the Saudi government.

== Personal life ==
Prince Fawwaz was married to Fawzia bint Hussain Izzat. He had only an adopted son who could not replace him in the Allegiance Council. He had a wide range of business activities related to property development in the kingdom. His wife and he also had a company based in Jeddah.

Fawwaz bin Abdulaziz was one of the royal family members who were harshly criticised by Juhayman Al Otaybi and Abdullah Al Qahtani, leaders of the group that seized the Grand Mosque of Mecca in 1979, for his unabashed drinking, gambling, and corruption.

== Death ==
Fawwaz died in Paris on 22 July 2008, at the age of 74, after suffering from a disease. His funeral was held in the Grand Mosque in Mecca on 23 July 2008. He was buried in Al Adl cemetery in Mecca. Condolence messages were sent to King Abdullah, the Saudi government and the Saudi royal family from King Hamad of Bahrain; the emir of Kuwait, Sabah Al-Ahmad Al-Jaber Al-Sabah; and the emir and crown prince of Qatar.

== Honors ==
Prince Fawwaz was the recipient of several decorations, including the Order of Cedar of Lebanon and various orders of merit from different countries.
