= Faisal bin Sattam Al Saud =

Saudi royal, businessman, lawyer and diplomat (born 1970)

Ambassador of Saudi Arabia to Italy
- In office: May 2017 – present
- Predecessor: Rayed Khalid Krimly
- Monarch: Salman
- Born: 1970 (age 55–56); Ta'if, Saudi Arabia
Names
- Faisal bin Sattam bin Abdulaziz Al Saud
- House: Al Saud
- Father: Sattam bin Abdulaziz
- Education: King Saud University; Harvard Law School

Faisal bin Sattam Al Saud (Arabic: فيصل بن سطام آل سعود; born 1970) is a Saudi Arabian businessman, lawyer, and diplomat who is the ambassador of Saudi Arabia to Italy since May 2017. He is a member of the House of Saud, a grandson of Saudi Arabia's founder King Abdulaziz.

== Early life and education ==
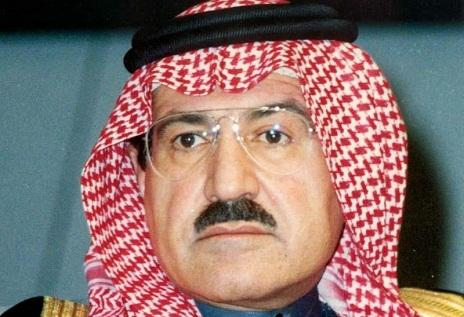
Prince Sattam, Prince Faisal's father

Prince Faisal was born in Ta'if in 1970. He is the fourth child of Sattam bin Abdulaziz. His brother, Abdulaziz bin Sattam, is an advisor at the Royal Court.

Prince Faisal completed his early education in Riyadh. He is a graduate of King Saud University, Riyadh, where he obtained a bachelor's degree in law in 1991. He received a masters of law degree from Harvard Law School in Cambridge, Massachusetts, U.S.A., in 1995.

== Career ==
Following his return to Saudi Arabia, Prince Faisal worked at private law firms in Riyadh until 2001. Next, he worked at World Trade Organization in Geneva for one year. From 2002, he started his business activities. He is the owner of Jeem Holding which is based in Riyadh and deals with different sectors, including transportation, sustainability and sustainable technologies, food and beverage and real estate.

Prince Faisal was named as ambassador to Italy at the rank of minister in May 2017, replacing Rayed Khalid Krimly in the post. He was accredited as ambassador of the Kingdom of Saudi Arabia in Italy, Malta and San Marino on 21 June 2018. He is ambassador extraordinary and plenipotentiary.

== Personal life ==
Prince Faisal is son-in-law of Mohammed bin Nawwaf Al Saud and has four children. He has a good command of English.
