= Al Jawhara bint Ibrahim Al Ibrahim =

Wife of King Fahd

- Spouse: King Fahd
- Issue: Prince Abdulaziz
- Al Jawhara bint Ibrahim Al Ibrahim
- House: Al Saud (by marriage)
- Father: Ibrahim Al Ibrahim
- Mother: Haya Al Assaf

Al Jawhara bint Ibrahim Al Ibrahim (Arabic: الجوهرة بنت إبراهيم آل إبراهيم) is one of the spouses of King Fahd who ruled the Kingdom of Saudi Arabia between 1982 and 2005 and mother of Prince Abdulaziz.

== Background ==
Al Jawhara Al Ibrahim is a member of wealthy merchant Al Ibrahim family. Her brothers are businessmen, including Waleed bin Ibrahim. One of her sisters, Maha Al Ibrahim, was married to former deputy minister of defense and aviation, Prince Abdul Rahman. Another sister, Mohdi Al Ibrahim, is married to former Saudi minister of higher education, Khaled Al Angari.

== Personal life and views ==
Al Jawhara Al Ibrahim divorced from her first husband to wed King Fahd. She became Fahd's fourth and favorite spouse. They had a son, Prince Abdulaziz, who is the youngest child of King Fahd.

After King Fahd suffered a stroke in 1995, limiting his capacity, he became dependent on her, who assisted him with all matters, including public affairs. Her eminence at his side provided her brothers with the opportunity to become influential businessmen, leading to jealousy and gossip in royal circles. In 2004 Al Jawhara Al Ibrahim argued that Saudi women should strictly follow the Islamic values and traditions in her speech at the graduation ceremony for female students at King Abdulaziz University. She also added that satellite TV channels were organizing "campaigns against Muslim women in general, and Saudi women in particular."

== Later life ==
Following the death of King Fahd in August 2005, Al Jawhara Al Ibrahim remained an influential and respected member of the royal family, and had close relations with senior royals, especially King Fahd's full brothers - the Sudairi Seven. The fact that she travelled with King Abdallah to Kuwait in January 2007 to pay the family's respects upon the death of the Amir Jabir Al Ahmad Al Sabah was considered a sign of her continuing influence.

After King Salman came to power and his son Mohammed became crown prince, they made Al Jawhara vacate her palace home. In June 2025 her mother died.
