= Sultana bint Abdulaziz Al Saud =

Saudi royal (c. 1928-2008)

- Born: 1928
- Died: 7 July 2008 (aged 79–80)
- Burial: 8 July 2008; Al Oud cemetery, Riyadh
Names
- Sultana bint Abdulaziz bin Abdul Rahman bin Faisal Al Saud
- House: Al Saud
- Father: King Abdulaziz
- Mother: Mudhi

Sultana bint Abdulaziz Al Saud (Arabic: سلطانة بنت عبد العزيز آل سعود; c. 1928 – 7 July 2008) was a member of the House of Saud.

== Biography ==
Sultana was born in around 1928. She was the daughter of King Abdulaziz and his twelfth wife, Mudhi who was an Armenian woman. Princess Sultana was full sister of Sattam, Majid and Haya.

Sultana bint Abdulaziz died on 7 July 2008, aged 80, after a long illness. Her funeral was held on 8 July 2008 at the Imam Turki bin Abdullah Grand Mosque in Riyadh. Condolence messages were sent to King Abdullah, the Saudi government and the Saudi royal family from the Bahraini ruler Hamad bin Isa Al Khalifa, and from the Qatari Emir Hamad bin Khalifa Al Thani and his son Tamim bin Hamad Al Thani.
