= Princes' School =

School in Riyadh, Saudi Arabia

Princes' School is a school in Riyadh, Saudi Arabia.

== History ==
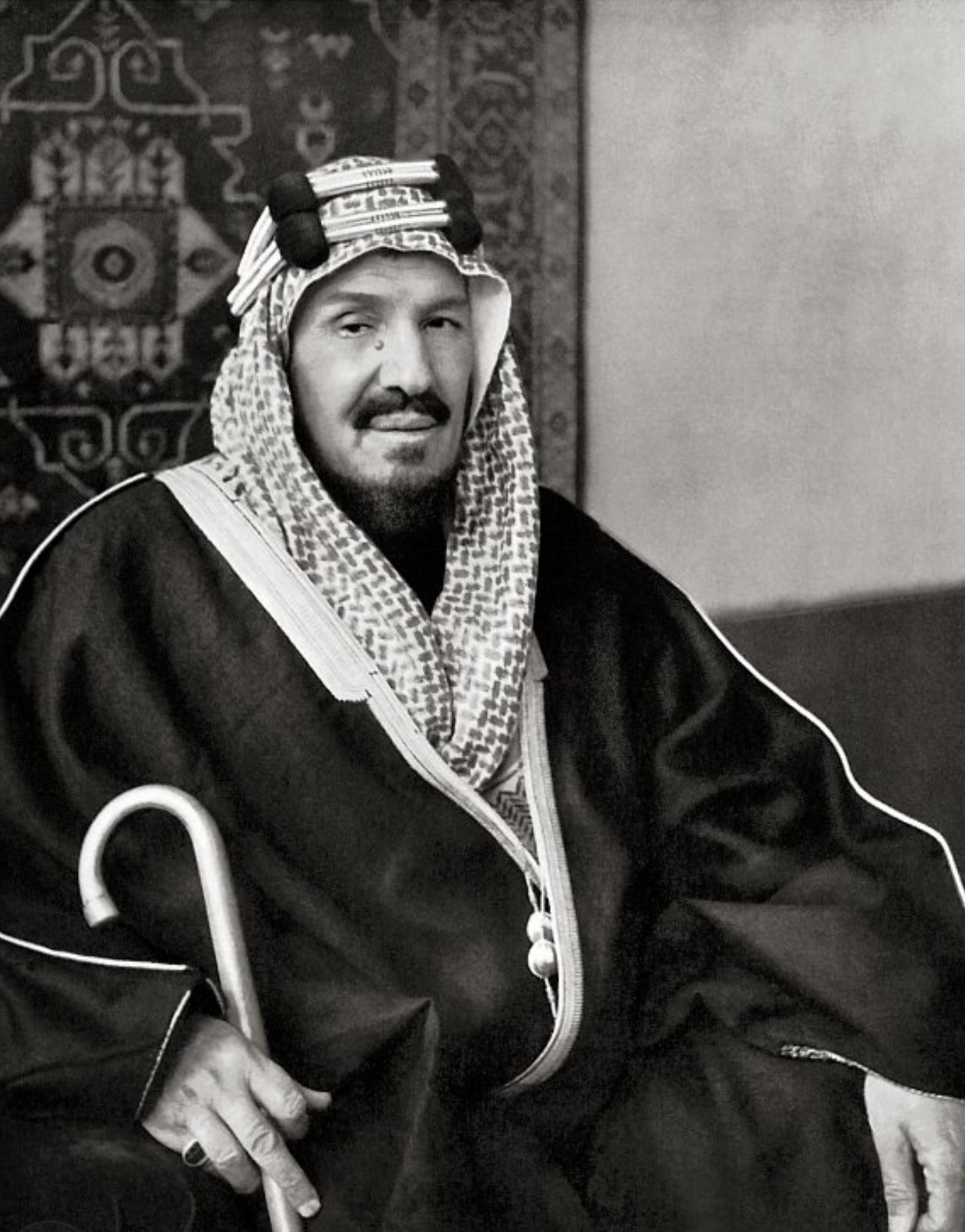
King Abdulaziz ibn Abdul Rahman, founder of the school

The Princes' School was established by King Ibn Saud specifically to ensure a high level of education for members of the House of Saud and sons of other foremost Saudis. In 1356 H (corresponding to 1937), the school was reorganised and reopened on the second floor of Deera Palace.

Early in the Ibn Saud newly established country, the Council of Senior Scholars or ulema thought education should only involve studying the Qur'an and Sharia law. The school was located in Ibn Saud’s palace and the imam of the Grand Mosque of Mecca taught there. The school was only conducted within the Royal court.

== Alumni ==
- Salman bin Abdulaziz Al Saud, King of Saudi Arabia
- Fahd bin Abdulaziz Al Saud, King of Saudi Arabia
- Ahmed bin Abdulaziz Al Saud
- Faisal bin Turki I bin Abdulaziz Al Saud
- Fawwaz bin Abdulaziz Al Saud
- Nayef bin Abdulaziz Al Saud
- Sattam bin Abdulaziz Al Saud
- Turki II bin Abdulaziz Al Saud

== See also ==
- Education in Saudi Arabia
