= Sattam bin Abdulaziz Al Saud =

Saudi royal and government official (1941–2013)

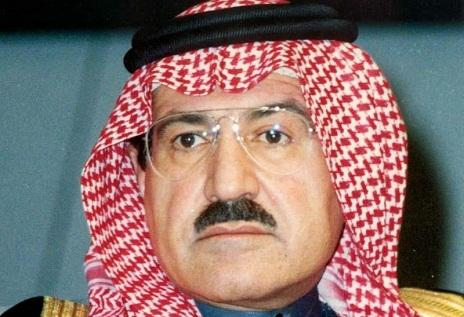

Governor of Riyadh Province
- Tenure: 5 November 2011 – 12 February 2013
- Appointed by: King Abdullah
- Predecessor: Salman bin Abdulaziz
- Successor: Khalid bin Bandar

Deputy Governor of Riyadh Province
- Tenure: 1979 – 5 November 2011
- Appointed by: King Khalid
- Successor: Muhammad bin Saad
- Born: 21 January 1941; Riyadh, Saudi Arabia
- Died: 12 February 2013 (aged 72); Riyadh, Saudi Arabia
- Burial: 13 February 2013; Al Adl cemetery, Mecca, Saudi Arabia
- Spouse: Sheikha bint Abdullah bin Abdul Rahman
- Issue: Hala; Abdulaziz; Najla; Faisal
- House: Al Saud
- Father: King Abdulaziz
- Mother: Muhdi
- Education: University of San Diego

Sattam bin Abdulaziz Al Saud (Arabic: سطام بن عبد العزيز آل سعود; 21 January 1941 – 12 February 2013) was a Saudi royal and politician who served as the governor of Riyadh Province from November 2011 until his death in February 2013. Before that he was the deputy governor of the province.

== Early life and education ==
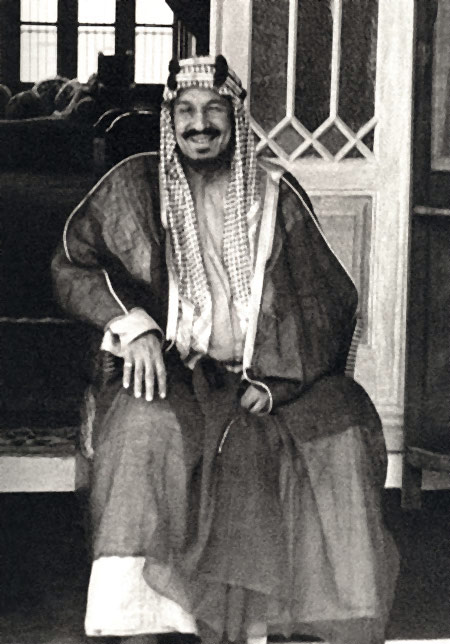
King Abdulaziz, Prince Sattam's father

Prince Sattam was born in Riyadh on 21 January 1941. He was the 30th son of King Abdulaziz. His mother was Mudhi who was an Armenian woman. He was the youngest of his full siblings, Prince Majid, Princess Sultana, and Princess Haya.

Sattam bin Abdulaziz began his early study in the Princes' School in Riyadh and later joined Al Anjaal institute. He attended Menlo College in 1962, but he did not completed his education there. Instead, he received a bachelor's degree in business administration from the University of San Diego, graduating in 1965. He received an honorary doctorate from the same university on 25 May 1975.

== Career ==
Sattam bin Abdulaziz was the former deputy governor of Riyadh from 1979 to 2011. Prince Mohammad bin Saad succeeded him in the post. On 5 November 2011, Prince Sattam was appointed governor of Riyadh Province. He was the 12th governor of Riyadh replacing Prince Salman in the post who was appointed defense minister.

=== Activities ===
In March 2012, Sattam bin Abdulaziz stated that single men would not be prevented from visiting malls in Riyadh on evenings and weekends. Previously, they were only allowed into malls at lunch time on weekdays.

=== Succession and other positions ===
In 2009 the leaked US cables argued that Prince Sattam was a dark-horse candidate to the throne following King Abdullah citing his success in governing Riyadh during the absence of Prince Salman, governor of Riyadh, in 2008.

Prince Sattam was a member of the following committees: Chairman of insolvent prisoners release committee; Deputy chairman of the executive committee of Saudization; Deputy chairman of the executive association of developing Riyadh; deputy chairman of the board of directors of water and sanitation association at Riyadh Province; deputy chairman of the board of directors of Al Berr association at Riyadh; deputy chairman of the committee of prince Salman project for charity housing; deputy chairman of Ibn Baz charity for helping youth to marry; deputy chairman of the orphans care association board at Riyadh region; chairman of the local committee for gathering donations for Kosovo and Chechnya Muslims at Riyadh region; deputy chairman of the civil defense committee; honorary deputy chairman of the patients’ friends committee at Riyadh region; deputy chairman of the renal failure patients care association at Riyadh region."

== Awards ==
Prince Sattam was a recipient of the King Abdulaziz cordon from the first class which is considered the highest order in the Kingdom of Saudi Arabia.

== Personal life ==
Sattam bin Abdulaziz married Sheikha bint Abdullah bin Abdul Rahman, a daughter of his uncle, Abdullah bin Abdul Rahman. They had four children: Hala, Abdulaziz, Najla and Faisal. One of his daughters, Najla, is married to Abdulaziz bin Majid.

== Death and funeral ==
On 12 February 2013, Prince Sattam died at the age of 72 following a lengthy illness in Riyadh. A funeral prayer was performed for him at Imam Turki bin Abdullah Mosque in Riyadh on 13 February 2013. The prayer, led by Sheikh Abdulaziz bin Abdullah Al al Shiekh, was also attended by King Abdullah and other senior princes and officials. Then his body was taken to Jeddah and was buried at the Al Adl cemetery in Mecca as per his will.

== Legacy ==
A university in Al Kharj was named after Prince Sattam, Prince Sattam bin Abdulaziz University.

Political offices
Preceded by Salman bin Abdulaziz	Governor of Riyadh Province; 2011–2013	Succeeded by Khalid bin Bandar
