= Khalid bin Mohammed Al Angari =

Saudi politician and diplomat (born 1952)

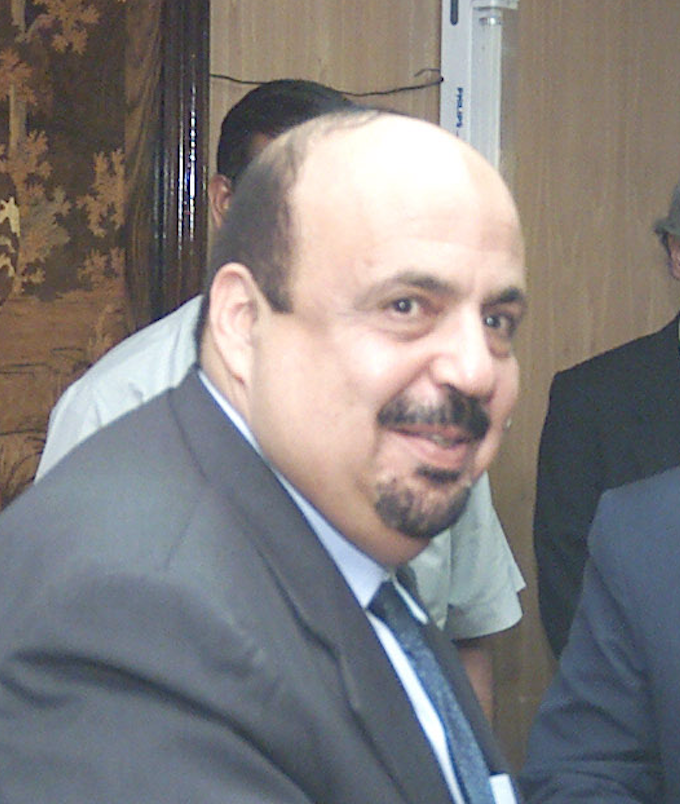
- Khalid bin Mohammed Al Angari, in 2006

Ambassador of Saudi Arabia to France
- In office 15 February 2016 – October 2019
- Prime Minister: King Salman
- Preceded by: Mohammed bin Ismail Al Sheikh

Minister of Higher Education
- In office 1991 – 8 December 2014
- Prime Minister: King Fahd; King Abdullah
- Succeeded by: Khalid bin Abdullah Al Sabti

Personal details
- Born: 1952 (age 73–74) Jeddah
- Spouse: Mohdi Al Ibrahim
- Education: University of Florida

Khalid bin Mohammed Al Angari (Arabic: خالد بن محمد العنقري; born 1952) is a Saudi politician who served as minister of higher education between 1991 and 8 December 2014. He was the ambassador of Saudi Arabia to France between February 2016 and October 2019.

== Early life and education ==
Angari was born in Jeddah in 1952. He has a PhD in geography which he received from the University of Florida in 1981, and an honorary doctorate degree from Umm al-Qura University, awarded in 2017.

== Career ==
Angari was a faculty member at King Saud University. He worked there from 1981 to 1983. He was then named as the deputy minister of municipal and rural affairs where he served from 1983 to 1984. He briefly served as minister of municipal and rural affairs from 1990 to 1991.

Al Angari was appointed minister of higher education by King Fahd. During his tenure, he increased the number of public universities from 7 to 28, established more than 500 colleges, and led the implementation of the Custodian of the Two Holy Mosques Scholarship program. He opened a four-day, 450 person higher education fair, which was conceived to allow Saudi students opportunities to study abroad and to meet with international institutions. In 2006, Al Angari signed a Memorandum of Understanding with his Indian counterpart, Arjun Singh, which allowed Saudi students to study in India.

In August 2013 Al Angari extended the King Abdullah Scholarship Program (KASP) to 2020 in an effort to improve the outcome of the Saudi education system. His term ended on 8 December 2014 when Khalid bin Abdullah Al Sabti replaced him as minister of higher education.

=== Ambassador to France ===
In February 2016 Khalid bin Mohammed Al Angari began to serve as the ambassador of Saudi Arabia to France, with the goal of increasing bilateral ties with the country, focusing on promoting tourism in Saudi Arabia, developing ties for higher education and research exchange, and strengthening counter terrorism ties.

Al Angari placed an emphasis on cultural and artistic exchanges by promoting events such as the MiSK Art exposition at the World Heritage Centre in Paris, participating in the Salon of Books in Paris, and organizing a Saudi art exposition at the Young International Artists art fair. In September 2016, he inaugurated the Saudi pavilion at the International Village of the Art of Cooking and Culture in Paris.

In November 2017, Al Angari conducted a visit to the Great Synagogue of Paris. This visit was the first of its kind, and Angari was received by France's chief rabbi, Haïm Korsia, and the synagogue's rabbi, Moshe Sebbag. His tenure ended in October 2019.

== Personal life ==
Al Angari is the brother-in-law of Walid Al Ibrahim. His wife is Mohdi Al Ibrahim, who is the sister of Al Jawhara bint Ibrahim Al Ibrahim, one of King Fahd's spouses. He has eight children.

Political offices
Preceded by Mohammed bin Ismail Al Sheikh	Ambassador of Saudi Arabia to France; 2016 – 2019	Succeeded by
Political offices
Preceded by	Minister of Higher Education; 1991 – 2014	Succeeded by Khalid bin Abdullah Al Sabti
