= Mansour bin Mutaib Al Saud =

Saudi royal, politician, and academic (born 1952)

Minister of State
- In office: 29 January 2015 – present
- Monarch: Salman

Minister of Municipal and Rural Affairs
- In office: 2 November 2009 – 29 January 2015
- Predecessor: Mutaib bin Abdulaziz Al Saud
- Successor: Abdullatif bin Abdulmalik Al Shaikh
- Monarch: Abdullah
- Born: 1952 (age 73–74)
- Spouse: Ibtisam bint Yazid bin Abdallah Al Abdul Rahman
- Issue: List: Princess Noura; Prince Mohammed; Prince Saud; Princess Sara; Prince Faisal
Names
- Mansour bin Mutaib bin Abdulaziz Al Saud
- House: House of Saud
- Father: Mutaib bin Abdulaziz
- Mother: Noura bint Mohammed bin Abdullah bin Abdul Latif Al Sheikh
- Education: George Washington University

Mansour bin Mutaib Al Saud (Arabic: منصور بن متعب آل سعود; born 1952) is a Saudi Arabian politician and academic who served as the minister of municipal and rural affairs of Saudi Arabia from 2009 to 2015. He has been a Minister of State since 2015. He is a member of House of Saud, a grandson of Saudi's founder King Abdulaziz.

== Early life and education ==
Prince Mansour was born in 1952. He is the son of Prince Mutaib bin Abdulaziz and Noura bint Mohammed bin Abdullah bin Abdul Latif Al Sheikh. His father was a son of King Abdulaziz. His mother, Princess Noura, is a member of the powerful Al Sheikh family, which controls religious matters in Saudi Arabia.

Mansour bin Mutaib received all his higher education degrees from George Washington University: a bachelor of arts degree in business administration in 1976; a master of arts degree in 1979 and a PhD in public administration in 1986. His thesis has the title of Improvement in the productivity of public sector in the Kingdom.

== Career ==
Mansour bin Mutaib joined King Saud University as an assistant professor in 1987. Then, he served as the director of the research center in the College of Administrative Sciences from 1987 to 1988. He became associate professor at the Department of Public Administration in 1995. He is still a member of the College of Business Administration advisory council at King Saud University.

Prince Mansour was appointed chairman of the general commission for municipal elections in late 2004. However, although he was in charge of municipal elections, it was then-interior minister Prince Nayef who stated that women cannot vote and stand for office in the elections.

He served as the deputy minister of municipal and rural affairs from 2006 to 2009. He was appointed minister of municipal and rural affairs to the Saudi cabinet, replacing his father Mutaib bin Abdulaziz on 2 November 2009. His term ended on 29 January 2015 when he was appointed minister of state. He is also advisor to King Salman. Prince Mansour was renamed as the minister of state to the cabinet led by Crown Prince and Prime Minister Mohammad bin Salman Al Saud on 27 September 2022.

== Views ==
After municipal council elections that were planned to be held in 2009 were postponed, Mansour bin Mutaib, then-deputy minister, indicated that recommendations for improving the municipal council system were the subject of a recent conference held in Ras Tanura, including women's right to vote in municipal council elections.

== Personal life ==
Prince Mansour is married to Ibtisam bint Yazid bin Abdullah Al Abdul Rahman. He has five children: Noura, Mohammed, Saud, Sara and Faisal.

Political offices
| Preceded by Mutaib bin Abdulaziz | Minister of Municipal and Rural Affairs; 2009 – 2015 | Succeeded by Abdullatif bin Abdulmalik Al Shaikh |
