= Al Shoula Group =

- Type: Private
- Founded: 1970; 56 years ago
- Headquarters: Riyadh, Saudi Arabia
- Key people: Mishaal Al Saud (Founder); Abdulaziz Al Saud (CEO)
- Website: alshoulagroup.com

Al Shoula Group was founded in 1970, and the founder was Mishaal Al Saud. Beginning with investments in insurance and real estate, it expanded into oil trading and ordinance support. Al Shoula's administrative control has been passed on to Prince Mishaal's son, Prince Abdulaziz bin Mishaal since the late 1990s.

Its growth gathered momentum as the Kingdom began investing heavily in infrastructure with Al Shoula developing an expertise in real estate development. The company has broad financial exposure in multibillion-dollar projects in Saudi Arabia and throughout the Persian Gulf region. It also has invested in cement manufacture, in the primary and secondary tiers of the petroleum and petrochemical industries, in addition to international finance.
