= Mutaib bin Abdulaziz Al Saud =

Saudi royal (1931–2019)

Minister of Municipal and Rural Affairs
- In office: 1980–2009
- Predecessor: Majid bin Abdulaziz
- Successor: Mansour bin Mutaib
- Monarch: King Khalid; King Fahd; King Abdullah

Minister of Public Works and Housing
- In office: 1975–1980
- Predecessor: Office established
- Successor: Muhammed bin Ibrahim Al Jarallah
- Monarch: King Khalid

Governor of Makkah Region
- In office: 1958–1961
- Predecessor: Faisal bin Abdulaziz
- Successor: Abdullah bin Saud bin Abdulaziz Al Saud
- Monarch: King Saud
- Born: 1931; Riyadh, Kingdom of Hejaz and Nejd
- Died: 2 December 2019 (aged 87–88)
- House: Al Saud
- Father: King Abdulaziz
- Mother: Shahida

Mutaib bin Abdulaziz Al Saud (Arabic: متعب بن عبد العزيز آل سعود, Mutʿib bin ʿAbd al ʿAzīz Āl Suʿūd) (1931 – 2 December 2019) was a senior member of the Saudi royal family and after the death of his half brother Prince Bandar in July 2019 was the oldest surviving son of King Abdulaziz.

== Early life and education ==
Prince Mutaib was born in Riyadh in 1931 as the seventeenth son of King Abdulaziz. He was the full brother of Prince Mansour, Prince Mishaal and Princess Qumash. Their mother, Shahida (died 1938), was an Armenian from Lebanon and reportedly one of King Abdulaziz's favorite wives.

Prince Mutaib received a bachelor's degree in political science in the USA in 1955.

== Career ==
Mutaib bin Abdulaziz served as deputy minister of defense from 1951 to 1956 when his full brother Mishaal bin Abdulaziz was the minister. Prince Mutaib served as governor of Makkah province from 1958 to 1961. He was one of the confidants of Abdullah Tariki when the latter was serving as the Saudi oil minister. He and Mishaal bin Abdulaziz were ousted from the office by King Saud. They both returned to the official offices in 1963 when Crown Prince Faisal entrusted them with the governorship. However, both resigned from their posts in 1971 for reasons that are not entirely clear.

Mutaib bin Abdulaziz rejoined the Saudi cabinet at the end of 1975 and served as minister of public works and housing until 1980. He became the first minister of public works and housing when it was first founded by King Khalid in this year. His appointment and Prince Majid's appointment as minister of municipal and rural affairs by King Khalid were a move to reduce the power of Sudairi Seven in the cabinet. Prince Mutaib's term ended in 1980, and he was replaced by Muhammed bin Ibrahim Al Jarallah in the post.

Later, Prince Mutaib served as minister of municipal and rural affairs from 1980 to 2009. He resigned from office, and his son Prince Mansour succeeded him in the aforementioned post in November 2009.

== Business activities ==
Prince Mutaib was reported to have benefited from all land projects in Saudi Arabia. He had this right as a result of his claim that his father, King Abdulaziz, had promised him the entire rights of the Kingdom's fishery revenues. The National Fisheries Company was founded by the House of Saud, and he became a partner of it. Prince Mutaib was a shareholder of the real-estate company, Société Générale d'Entreprises Touristiques, which was chaired by Walid Saab. He also had a beverage firm.

== Personal life ==
Mutaib bin Abdulaziz lived in later years in the Trump Tower in New York City where he owned an entire floor of the building.

Prince Mutaib had ten children, two sons and eight daughters. He was the custodian of Prince Talal bin Mansour (born 1951), who is the son of his brother Prince Mansour. Prince Mutaib's daughter Princess Nouf married Prince Talal. She died in Riyadh at the age of 34 in February 2001.

As of 2013 Prince Mutaib was the 98th richest Arab in the world with the net worth of US $110.1 million.

Prince Mutaib died on 2 December 2019. Funeral prayer was held at the Great Mosque of Mecca the next day.
