= Abdullatif bin Abdulmalik Al Shaikh =

Saudi government minister

Abdul Latif Bin Abdul Malek Bin Omar Al Al Shaikh is a Saudi governmental official serving as the Saudi Minister of Municipal and Rural Affairs and is the third Al Al Shaikh to serve in King Salman's 2015 Cabinet. Abdul Latif Bin Abdul Malek is a King Saud University graduate where he earned an engineering degree, he first worked as the Program Management Officer of the Riyadh Development Authority before becoming Director at the ”Center of Significant Projects and Planning“ (Rank 15) at the Riyadh Region Municipality, which was one of the highest posts in the municipal government.
