= Bandar bin Faisal Al Saud =

Saudi royal, military officer and businessman (1943–2015)

- Born: 1943; Taif
- Died: November 2015 (aged 72–73)
- Burial: Al Oud cemetery, Riyadh
- Spouse: Basma bint Majid bin Abdulaziz Al Saud
- Issue: Princess Hanah; Prince Sultan
Names
- Bandar bin Faisal bin Abdulaziz bin Abdul Rahman Al Saud
- House: Al Saud
- Father: King Faisal
- Mother: Iffat bint Mohammad Al Thunayan
- Education: Hun School; Pomona College; Whittier College; Royal Air Force College Cranwell; RAF Staff College; University of Washington

Bandar bin Faisal Al Saud (1943 – November 2015) was a Saudi Arabian businessman and Royal Saudi Air Force officer. A member of the Saudi royal family, he was one of the children of King Faisal and Iffat Al Thunayan. He was one of the grandsons of Saudi Arabia's founder King Abdulaziz.

== Early life and education ==
Bandar bin Faisal was born in Taif in 1943 and raised there. He was one of nine children of King Faisal and Iffat Al Thunayan. His full siblings were Princess Sara, Prince Mohammed, Princess Latifa, Prince Saud, Prince Abdul Rahman, Prince Turki, Princess Luluwah and Princess Haifa.

Prince Bandar was a graduate of the Hun School. He received a bachelor's degree from Pomona College and also, from Whittier College in California. Next he graduated from Royal Air Force College Cranwell in 1967 and RAF Staff College. He also received a graduate degree from the University of Washington.

One of his classmates in Cranwell was Bandar bin Sultan, husband of his sister, Haifa.

== Career and activities ==
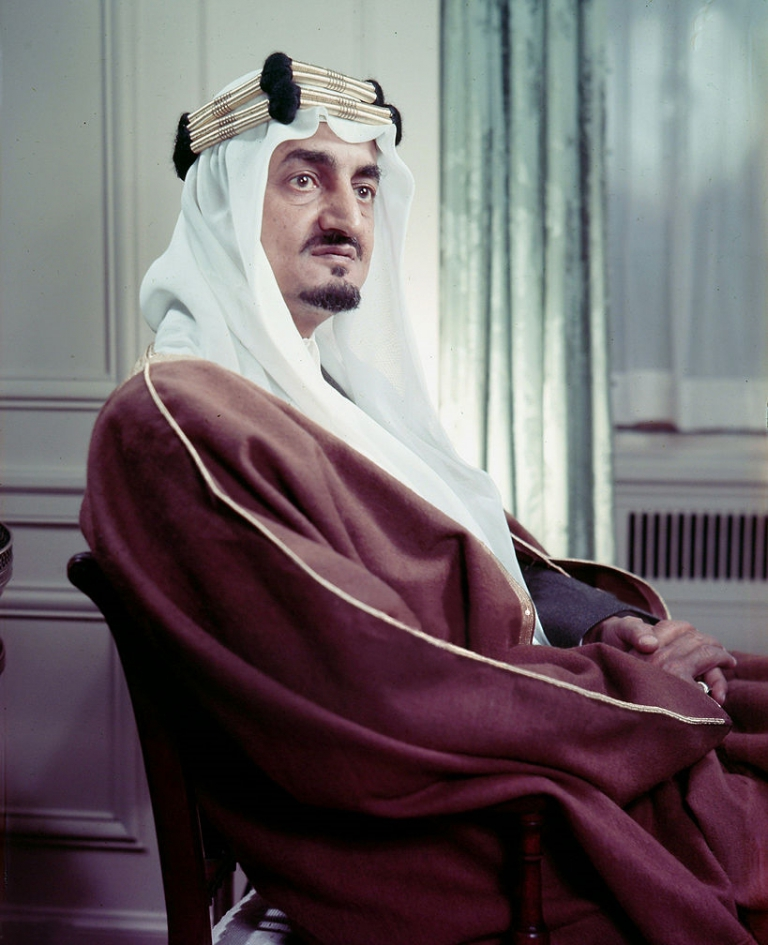
King Faisal, father of Bandar

Following graduation, Prince Bandar joined the royal air force and began to work as a fighter pilot in the lightning squad. Then he became a lieutenant colonel. He worked at the intelligence unit of the force and also served as the head of the negotiation teams of the force. Later, he was promoted to the rank of lieutenant general. In 2007, he retired from the air force after serving forty years. Then he worked as a senior military advisor at the Ministry of Defense and Aviation.

While serving in the air force, Prince Bandar was also involved in business. In the mid-1980s he founded the Saudi Group, a joint venture with his wife Basma bint Majid and his nephew Prince Saud bin Abdullah.

He was one of the early members of the Saudi National Commission for Wildlife. In 2007, Prince Bandar initiated a project to protect the indigenous wildlife in Saudi Arabia.

== Personal life ==
Prince Bandar married his cousin Basma bint Majid, a daughter of Prince Majid bin Abdulaziz. He had two children, Prince Sultan and Princess Hanah.

== Death ==
Bandar bin Faisal died in November 2015. He was buried in Riyadh following the afternoon prayer at the Imam Turki bin Abdullah Mosque.
