= Ibn Nasir =

Ibn Nasir (Arabic: بن ناصر; alternatively spelled بناصر or ابن ناصر), also transliterated as Bennacer, bin Nasser, ibn Nasser, Ben Nasser, Ben Naceur, Bennasser, and Bennaceur, is an Arabic surname and patronym meaning son of Nasir. Notable people with the name include:

- Abdul Aziz bin Nasser al-Thani, Qatari businessman
- Abdul Rahman bin Nasser Al-Saadi (1889-1957), Saudi Islamic scholar
- Abdul-Rahman bin Nasir al-Barrak, Saudi cleric
- Abdullah bin Nasser Al Thani (businessman), Qatari businessman
- Abdullah bin Nasser Al Thani (prime minister) (born 1960), Qatari politician
- Abdullah ibn Husayn ibn Nasser al-Ahmar (1933–2007), Yemeni politician and tribal leader
- Abu Abdallah al-Husayn ibn Nasir al-Dawla, Hamdanid prince
- Abu Tahir Ibrahim ibn Nasir al-Dawla, Hamdanid prince
- Abu'l-Fawaris Muhammad ibn Nasir al-Dawla, Hamdanid prince
- Ali Ben Nasser (born 1944), Tunisian soccer referee
- Ahmad ibn Mohammed ibn Nasir al-Salawi (1791–1840), Moroccan Maliki scholar, Sufi teacher, and writer
- Ahmed ibn Nasir (1647–1717), Moroccan writer
- Anouar Ben Naceur (born 1983), Tunisian swimmer
- Bassem Ben Nasser (born 1982), Tunisian soccer player
- Fahd bin Muhammad bin Nasser Al-Hayyan (1971–2023), Saudi Arabian actor
- Fatima Zahra Bennacer (born 1981), Moroccan actress
- Hussein ibn Nasser (1902–1982), Jordanian prince and statesman
- Ismaël Bennacer (born 1997), French footballer
- Kenza Bennaceur (born 1976), Algerian swimmer
- Khaled bin Nasser Al-Rasheed (born 1974), Saudi Arabian soccer player
- Madeeha bint Ahmed bin Nassir al Shibaniyah, Omani politician
- Mansour bin Nasser Al Saud (born 1959), Saudi diplomat
- Mariam bint Ali bin Nasser al-Misnad, Qatari politician
- Mohammed ibn Nasir (1603–1674), Moroccan theologian and physician
- Mohammed ibn Abdessalam ibn Nasir (died 1824), Moroccan writer
- Muhammad bin Nasir (died 1728), Omani imam
- Muhammad bin Nasser Al-Aboudi (1926–2022), Saudi writer
- Muhammad ibn Nasir, sultan of Adal in East Africa
- Mustapha Bennacer (born 1977), Algerian long-distance runner
- Saad ibn Nasser al-Shathri, Saudi Arabian Islamic scholar
- Saeed bin Nasir (born 1979), Pakistani cricketer
- Saeed bin Naser Alghamdi (born 1961), Saudi academic
- Salem Ben Nasser Al-Ismaily, Omani executive
- Salim bin Nasser bin Said Al Aufi, Omani politician
- Sattam bin Khalid bin Nasser Al Saud, Saudi royal
- Saud bin Abdulaziz bin Nasser (born 1977), Saudi royal convicted of murder
- Sultan bin Nasser al-Suwaidi (born 1953), Emirati banker
- Turki bin Mohammed bin Nasser bin Abdulaziz Al Saud (born 1969), Saudi royal
- Turki bin Nasser Al Saud (1948–2021), Saudi military officer
- Youssef Aït Bennasser (born 1996), French-Moroccan soccer player

== See also ==
- Ibn Reza, similar name
- Benazir, similar name
- Ebenezer, homonym
