= Abdulrahman Al-Ghamdi =

Abdulrahman Al-Ghamdi may refer to:

- Abdulrahman Al-Ghamdi (footballer, born 1986), Saudi footballer for Al-Selmiyah
- Abdulrahman Al-Ghamdi (footballer, born 1994), Saudi footballer for Al-Ittihad
- Abdulrahman Al-Ghamdi (footballer, born 2006), Saudi footballer for Al-Taawoun

== See also ==
- Abdul Rahman Al-Ghamdi (born 1974), citizen of Saudi Arabia believed to have been a jihadist
