= Noura bint Sultan Al Saud =

Saudi royal (born 1948)

- Born: 1948 (age 77–78)
- Spouse: Turki bin Nasser Al Saud
Names
- Noura bint Sultan bin Abdulaziz bin Abdul Rahman Al Saud
- House: Al Saud
- Father: Sultan bin Abdulaziz Al Saud

Noura bint Sultan Al Saud (Arabic: نورة بنت سلطان آل سعود; born 1948) is a member of the Saudi royal family. She is the daughter of former Crown Prince Sultan and widow of Turki bin Nasser Al Saud.

== Biography ==
Noura bint Sultan was born in 1948. She is one of fifteen daughters of Prince Sultan. She married Turki bin Nasser, a son of Prince Nasser. She has two sons and five daughters with Turki. One of their children is Faisal bin Turki, former husband of Reema bint Bandar who is the Saudi Ambassador to the US. Her daughter, Lama bint Turki, is an amateur jumper.

As of 2001, Princess Noura had stakes in six companies based in Saudi Arabia. It was reported by several media outlets that Noura bint Sultan had received a 170,000 pound Rolls-Royce as a birthday present, flown out to Saudi Arabia in a cargo plane chartered by the BAE Systems which was investigated related to the corruption allegations under Al Yamamah arms deal.
