= Ghamd (surname) =

Al-Ghamdi (Arabic: الغامدي, Al-Ghāmdī, also transliterated as Alghamdi, Ghamdi, or Ghamidi) is an Arabic family name denoting a member of the Ghamd tribe of Saudi Arabia, one of the oldest tribes in Arabia.

== People ==
- Abdulrahman Al-Ghamdi (footballer, born 1986), Saudi footballer
- Abdulrahman Al-Ghamdi (footballer, born 1994), Saudi footballer
- Adel Al-Ghamdi, Saudi businessman
- Khalid Al-Ghamdi (born 1988), Saudi footballer
- Omar Al-Ghamdi (born 1979), Saudi footballer
- Saad al Ghamdi (born 1967), Saudi Islamic scholar
- Saeed bin Naser Alghamdi (born 1961), Saudi Islamic scholar
- Safar al-Hawali al-Ghamdi (born 1950), Saudi Islamic scholar
