= Azd Shanua =

South Arabian tribal group in the Hijaz region

Azd Shanū’ah أزد شنوءة
- Qahtanite Arabs
- Ethnicity: Arab
- Nisba: al-Azdī
- Location: Mainly in the Al Bahah Region, Saudi Arabia
- Descended from: ʻAbd Allāh al-Ḥārith
- Parent tribe: Azd
- Religion: Sunni Islam (formerly South Arabian polytheism)

The Azd Shanū’ah (Arabic: أزد شنوءة) also spelled as Shanuwah, are a group of South Arabian tribes in the Hijaz that were descended from the larger Azd group. The Banu Lahab, Banu Zahran and Banu Ghamd, including their branches, are among the few parts of the Azd Shanu'ah. Formerly residing in Yemen, they emigrated from it in masses during the 2nd century CE.

== Tribal lineage ==
The traditional genealogy of the Azd Shanu'ah is that they are descended from a man named 'Abd Allah al-Harith, whose full lineage is given as; 'Abd Allah al-Harith, son of Ka'b, son of 'Abd Allah, son of Malik, son of Nasr, son of al-Azd. This traces the ancestry of 'Abd Allah al-Harith back to al-Azd, the progenitor of the Azd tribe, and also makes him a Qahtanite Arab due to the Azd being descended from Qahtan.

=== Branches ===
The most prominent branches of the Azd Shanu'ah include the Banu Lahab, Banu Ghamid, and the Banu Zahran.

== Characteristics ==
=== Etymology ===
According to Ibn Duraid, the word Shanu'ah in their name originated from the term "shan'ah" which was expressed as a form of resentment; the Azd Shanu'ah reportedly received their name because their progenitor had enmity with his contemporary tribal chiefs. Shihab al-Din al-Khafaji gave a more positive view, saying that the Shanu'ah was a term referring to the righteous, pious and noble people of high lineage.

According to Ibn Qutaybah, the Azd Shanu'ah can also be known by the alternative spelling, Shanuwah.

=== Appearance ===
The early Arabians characterized the Azd Shanu'ah as having light, thin bodies that were agile, with dark skin. In some hadith, it was reported that the Islamic prophet Muhammad compared the Azd Shanu'ah to the biblical Moses, noting their similarities in appearance and height.

=== Personality ===
The Azd Shanu'ah were known amongst the early Arabians to be very eloquent poets and writers. They also preferred living in mountainous and rural areas in the Arabian Peninsula.

== History ==
The Azd Shanu'ah originated in ancient Yemen and were contemporary to the Sabaeans. After the collapse of the Ma'rib Dam, the Azd Shanu'ah emigrated from Yemen under the leadership of Muzayqiya, as their homeland had not become suitable for them to live in anymore. They migrated to the Sarawat Mountains where they stayed. Yaqut al-Hamawi narrates that the Azd Shanu'ah had conflict with some Amalekites who inhabited the mountainous region temporarily. The migration to the Hijaz has been dated to the 2nd or 3rd centuries CE, based on contemporary inscriptions.

In the 7th century, the Azd Shanu'ah converted to Islam from polytheism; a good portion of them were part of the Sahaba, companions of Muhammad. After 630 CE, all of the tribes in the Hijaz began to profess Islam, most likely including the remainder of the Azd Shanu'ah. In later years, members of the Azd Shanu'ah became governors of provinces under the Rashidun and Umayyad Caliphates respectively.

In modern times, descendants of this ancient tribe exist and live in the towns and rural villages of the Al Bahah Region.

== See also ==
- Tribes of Arabia
- Khindif
