= Candice Cohen-Ahnine =

French-Jewish woman involved in custody battle with Saudi Prince (1977–2012)

- Born: c. 1977
- Died: 16 August 2012; Paris, France
- Partner: Sattam bin Khalid bin Nasser Al Saud
- Children: Aya Al Saud

Candice Cohen-Ahnine (c. 1977 – 16 August 2012) was a French Jewish mother involved in a legal battle with Saudi Prince Sattam bin Khalid bin Nasser Al Saud over custody for her child Aya, who she said was kidnapped from her. In January 2012, a French court ruled that the prince must hand over the child to Cohen-Ahnine, and the prince faced an international arrest warrant. On 16 August 2012, Cohen-Ahnine fell to her death from a Paris window under mysterious circumstances, days after she told her family that she did not feel safe.

== Custody battle ==
In 1998, Cohen-Ahnine met Prince Sattam bin Khalid bin Nasser Al Saud, a grandson of Prince Nasser, in London at a nightclub while vacationing in London when she was 18 years old. During his courtship, he pretended that he was Jewish but he wanted to keep it as a family secret.

In November 2001, their daughter, Aya, was born.

The relationship between Cohen-Ahnine and the Prince continued, despite their differences in religion and nationality until he announced in 2006 that he was obligated to marry a cousin, but that Cohen-Ahnine could remain as a second wife. Cohen-Ahnine, however, refused to become a second wife, and the two parted ways.

In September 2008, Prince Sattam allegedly kidnapped Aya when she and her mother visited Saudi Arabia. Cohen-Ahnine said that she had been accused by the Saudi authorities of being a Muslim who converted to Judaism, a capital crime in Saudi Arabia, and was held in the prince's palace. However, she reportedly escaped when a maid left her door open and fled to the French embassy, and subsequently returned to France. Since then, Aya has been living in a palace in Riyadh, while France's Foreign Ministry (as well as former French President Nicolas Sarkozy) attempted to bring the child back to France. Aya spoke occasionally with her mother by telephone.

Prince Sattam denied that he had kidnapped either Aya or her mother, saying that Cohen-Ahnine was allowed to "come and go as she pleased" and that she had converted to Islam and married Prince Sattam under Islamic law. The prince said the terms of the divorce, which were put through courts in Lebanon and Saudi Arabia, required that the parents share custody of the child. The prince also said that a protocol was created which offered Cohen-Ahnine a house (all expenses paid) and access to Aya, and the possibility of taking Aya on vacation for 1.5 months a year.

Cohen-Ahnine was involved in diplomatic attempts to receive custody of Aya, and wrote a book about her struggle, entitled Give My Daughter Back!. She stated that she had seen Facebook pictures of Aya in a niqab and playing with the Prince's firearms, and became concerned over her daughter.

=== Court verdict ===
In January 2012, a Paris criminal court ordered Prince al-Saud to hand over custody of Aya to her mother and also to provide child support of €10,000 (£8,300) each month. Cohen-Ahnine said that the ruling was a "great victory for me and vindicates everything I have said... but I'm still very worried for my child's future." Cohen-Ahnine's lawyer said, "It's a first step in a long journey. Aya must be returned to her mother so that she can live in France, where she has always lived."

Prince Sattam said that he would challenge the decision and send lawyers to France, and said that France does not have the right to take her back. The prince said, "She is a Saudi citizen and a princess. They cannot oblige a princess to leave this country." The prince also said, "If need be, I'll go like [Osama] bin Laden and hide in the mountains with Aya." As a result of the court ruling, Prince Sattam faced an international arrest warrant for ignoring the verdict.

== Death ==
Following the court ruling, Cohen-Ahnine prepared to leave for Riyadh in September 2012 to visit Aya.

On 16 August, Cohen-Ahnine died after falling to her death from a window in Paris. It is unclear whether the death was an accident or was a murder, but suicide has been ruled out.

A few days prior to her death, Cohen-Ahnine told relatives that she felt threatened, and French police were reportedly investigating if she had been trying to escape from her flat, "as if she was escaping something dangerous", and fell out of the window. According to the London Evening Standard, investigations conducted by the Paris prosecutor suggested that Cohen-Ahnine was attempting to get into a neighboring apartment by climbing through the window.

Cohen-Ahnine's lawyer said the death appeared to be "some sort of accident" and did not know whether it was malicious, but did say that "what I can tell you is that it wasn't a suicide". Jean-Claude Elfassi, a co-author of Cohen-Ahnine's book, said, "I can only show my disgust at the slowness of the investigating judge in charge of her case, who after three years of investigating never delivered an arrest warrant for Prince Sattam al-Saud."

On 21 August, the police announced that Cohen-Ahnine's death was an accident. A witness confirmed seeing her trying to move from one window to another. The police suspect that she was under antidepressant medication; toxicology results are expected.

On 14 June 2013 it was announced that the second husband of Candice Cohen-Ahnine Alain Cucumel was "mis en examen" (in the French criminal procedure the point at which a person formally becomes a suspect at law) for "aggravated assault and battery causing unintentional death".

== See also ==
- List of unsolved deaths
