= List of people who did not pledge allegiance to Abu Bakr =

This is a list of people who did not pledge allegiance to Abu Bakr following the succession at Saqifa and the subsequent establishment of his caliphate.

When the Islamic prophet Muhammad died in 632 CE, his Medinese supporters, known as the Ansar, gathered at the Saqifa to elect a leader from among themselves to maintain their autonomy, fearing domination by the Quraysh. Meanwhile, Ali was expected by a segment of the community to succeed the Islamic prophet Muhammad upon his death, due to their close kinship and Muhammad's reported preference. As he performed Muhammad's funeral rites, a group of companions of Muhammad left and proclaimed Abu Bakr as the caliph, while the rest remained loyal either to Saʽd ibn ʽUbadah, representing the Medinans and the Ansar, or to Ali, representing his claim to the succession.

== Background ==
In the immediate aftermath of Muhammad's death in 11 AH (632 CE), several of the Ansar (natives of Medina) gathered in the Saqifah (courtyard) of the Saida clan. According to Madelung, the Ansar likely believed that their allegiance to Muhammad had elapsed with his death and expected that Muhammad's community would disintegrate. For this reason, the purpose of their meeting might had simply been to re-establish control over their city, Medina, under the belief that the majority of the Muhajirun (migrants from Mecca) would return to Mecca anyway.

Upon learning about the meeting, Muhammad's companions Abu Bakr and Umar quickly forced their way into Saqifah. After a heated meeting, in which a chief of the Ansar was beaten into submission by Umar, the small group of Muslims gathered at Saqifah agreed on Abu Bakr as the new head of the Muslim community. The Saqifah event did not include Muhammad's family, who were preparing to bury him, and many of the Muhajirun. Many members of Muhammad's clan, the Banu Hashim, as well as a number of Muhammad's companions opposed the nomination of Abu Bakr; they held that Ali was the rightful successor of Muhammad, appointed by him at the Event of Ghadir Khumm. The issue over the succession to Muhammad would eventually lead to the formation of the two main sects of Islam, with Sunnis considering Abu Bakr to be Muhammad's rightful successor and Shias believing that Ali was the rightful successor to Muhammad. (Note: The Shia view is that Ali was the rightful political and religious successor to Muhammad and that though his political right was taken by Abu Bakr and later political rulers, he and his successors were still the religious leaders of Islam.)

== List ==
According to various sources, many people did not pledge allegiance to Abu Bakr immediately after the Saqifah. Some did later, for various reasons. They included:

Name	House	Position during Muhammad's lifetime	Notes
Abbas ibn Abd al-Muttalib	Banu Hashim	Uncle of Muhammad	Ibn Qutaybah, a 9th century Sunni Islamic scholar says that Abbas ibn Abd al-Muttalib had told Abu Bakr that, "If you demanded what you demanded through kinship to the Messenger of Allah, then you had confiscated our own. If you had demanded it due to your position among Muslims, then ours is a more prestigious than yours. If this affair is accomplished when the believers are pleased with it, then it cannot be so as long as we are displeased therewith."; Al-Ya'qubi, a 9th century Shia scholar narrates "A group of Muhajirs and Ansars kept themselves aloof from allegiance to Abu Bakr and were followers of Hazrat Ali [as]. Among them were Abbas Bin Abdul-Muttalib...Fadl ibn Abbasi"; Muhammad al-Bukhari, a 9th-century Sunni Islamic scholar narrates the same as Al-Ya'qubi.
Abu Ayyub al-Ansari	Banu Khazraj	Host of Muhammad following the migration to Medina until Muhammad's house was built	
Abu Buraidah al-Aslami	Banu Aslam		
Abu Dharr al-Ghifari	Banu Ghifar	One of the earliest converts to Islam	
Al-Bara' ibn Azib	Banu Khazraj		
Ali ibn Abi Talib	Banu Hashim		Mohammad al-Bukhari collected a hadith in his collection on the authority of Aisha that Ali swore oath to Abu Bakr after the death of Fatimah.; A similar but shorter version of the hadith was also collected by Muslim ibn al-Hallaj in his collection.
Ammar ibn Yasir	Banu Makhzum (affiliation)	One of the earliest converts to Islam	
Bilal ibn Rabah	Banu Jumah	One of the earliest converts to Islam; Appointed by Muhammad to be the Muezzin (person who proclaims the call to prayer); Treasurer of Muhammad	During Muhammad's life, Bilal had been appointed as the Muezzin (one who recites the Adhan, the Islamic call to prayer). Afterward, Bilal refused to pledge allegiance to Abu Bakr. He recited the Adhan only once more, at the request of Muhammad's daughter Fatimah.
Fadl ibn Abbas	Banu Hashim	Cousin of Muhammad	
Abd Allah ibn Abbas	Banu Hashim	Cousin of Muhammad	
Khalid ibn Sa'id (Disputed)	Banu Umayya		
Khuzayma ibn Thabit	Banu Aws		
Malik ibn Nuwayrah	Banu Yarbu	Appointed by Muhammad to collect taxes in north-east Arabia	
Miqdad ibn Aswad	Banu Kinda		
Qays ibn Sa'd	Banu Khazraj		
Saʽd ibn ʽUbadah	Banu Khazraj	Leader of Banu Khazraj	As part of a speech refusing to give allegiance to Abu Bakr, Sa'd ibn Ubadah said, "I will not renounce by the truth of God. Even if the demons and all the men allied themselves to support you, I will not join them, and will wait until I know the judgement of the Almighty." It is reported that he never gave allegiance to Abu Bakr for the entirety of the latter's reign.
Salman the Persian	Mawla (Persian)		
Sahl ibn Hunayf	Banu Aws		
Talha ibn Ubayd Allah (Disputed)	Banu Taym		The ninth-century Sunni historian Al-Tabari reports that Talha was among those who gathered in Ali's house after the event of Saqifa.
Ubayy ibn Ka'b	Banu Khazraj		
Utbah ibn Abi Lahab	Banu Hashim		
Uthman ibn Hunayf	Banu Aws		
Zubayr ibn al-Awwam	Banu Asad		Al-Bukhari, a 9th-century Sunni Shafii Islamic scholar narrates that Umar said, "Ali and Zubair and whoever was with them, opposed us, while the emigrants gathered with Abu Bakr."; The Sunni historian Al-Tabari writes that "Umar b. al-Khattab came to the house of Ali. Talhah, al-Zubayr, and some of the Muhajirun were [also] in the house [with Ali]. Umar cried out, "By God, either you come out to render the oath of allegiance [to Abu Bakr], or I will set the house on fire." Al-Zubayr came out with his sword drawn. As he stumbled [upon something], the sword fell from his hand, so they jumped over him and seized him."
