= Abd Allah ibn Mughaffal =

Companion of Muhammad (d. 60 AH)

Abu Ziyad Abd Allah ibn Mughaffal (Arabic: عبد الله بن مغفّل) (died 60 AH) was a companion of the Prophet Muhammad. He was one of the companions who attended the Pledge of the Tree where he pledged allegiance to the Prophet. He initially resided in Medina before moving to Basra, where he built a house near the main mosque.

He was also known as Abu Ziyad, Abu Abdul Rahman, or Abu Saeed. He had several children, including Saeed and Ziyad, who were among the notable companions.

He died in Basra in the year 60 or 61 AH and requested that Abu Barza al-Aslami lead his funeral prayer.
