= Sattam bin Khalid Al Saud =

Saudi Arabian prince

- Issue: Aya
Names
- Sattam bin Khalid bin Nasser bin Abdulaziz Al Saud
- House: House of Saud
- Father: Khalid bin Nasser bin Abdulaziz Al Saud

Sattam bin Khalid bin Nasser Al Saud, is a member of House of Saud and a grandson of Prince Nasser.

== Personal life ==
In 1998, Sattam met Candice Cohen-Ahnine in London at a nightclub while vacationing in London when she was 18 years old. In November 2001, their daughter, Haya, was born.

The relationship between Sattam and Cohen-Ahnine continued, despite their differences in religion and nationality until Sattam announced in 2006 that he was obligated to marry a cousin, but that Cohen-Ahnine could remain a second wife. Cohen-Ahnine, however, refused to become a second wife, and the two began to separate.

In September 2008, Prince Sattam allegedly kidnapped Haya when she and her mother visited Saudi Arabia. Cohen-Ahnine said that she had been accused by the Saudi authorities of being a Muslim who converted to Judaism, a capital crime in Saudi Arabia, and was held in the prince's palace. However, she reportedly escaped when a maid left her door open and fled to the French embassy, and subsequently returned to France. Since then, Haya has been living in a palace in Riyadh, while France's Foreign Ministry (as well as former French President Nicolas Sarkozy) has attempted to bring the child back to France. Haya spoke occasionally with her mother by telephone.

Sattam denied that he had kidnapped either Haya or her mother, saying that Cohen-Ahnine was allowed to "come and go as she pleased" and that she had converted to Islam and married him under Islamic law. The prince said the terms of the divorce, which were put through courts in Lebanon and Saudi Arabia, required that the parents share custody of the child. Sattam also said that a protocol was created that offered Cohen-Ahnine a house (all expenses paid) access to Haya, and the possibility of taking Haya on vacation for 1.5 months a year.

Cohen-Ahnine was involved in diplomatic attempts to receive custody of Haya, and wrote a book about her struggle, titled Give My Daughter Back! She stated that she had seen Facebook pictures of Haya in a niqab and playing with the Prince's firearms, and became concerned over her daughter. Cohen-Ahnine died on 16 August 2012 after falling to her death from a window in Paris. Following the court ruling, Cohen-Ahnine prepared to leave for Riyadh in September 2012 to visit Haya.

In 2012, Sattam married the Governor of Jazan Prince Mohammed bin Nasser bin Abdulaziz's daughter in Riyadh.
