= Ghamd =

Arabian tribe

Ghamd غامد
- Arabian tribe
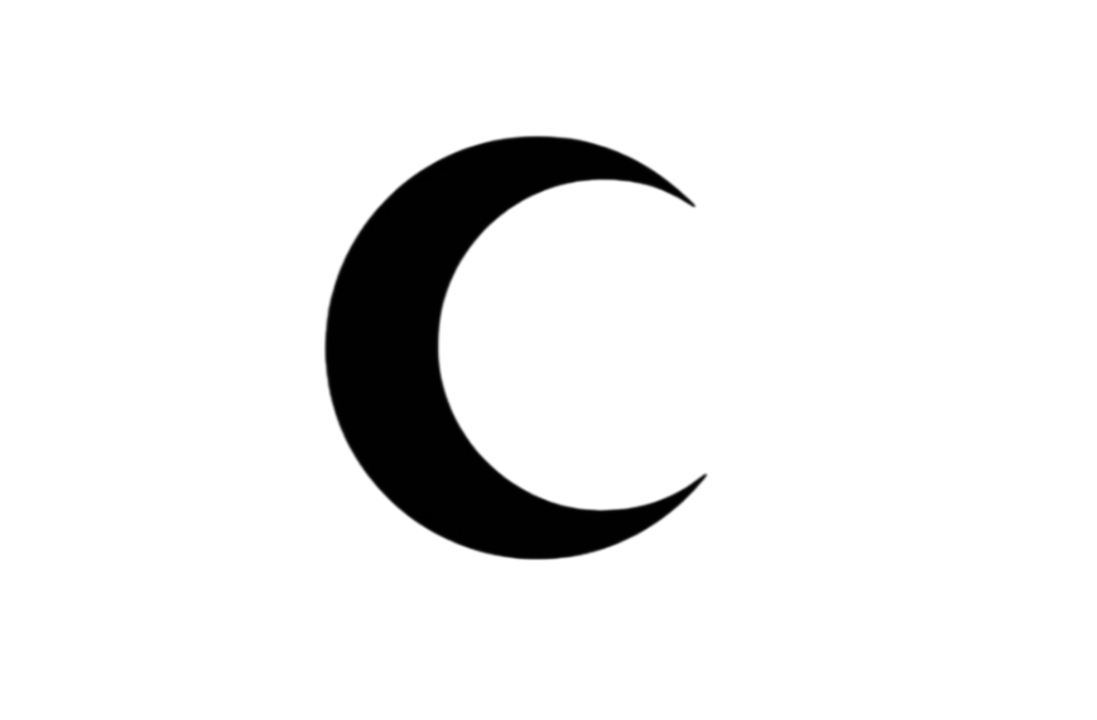
- The flag of the Ghamd tribe (Crescent) during the rule of the Al-Yazid Emirate.
- Nisba: Ghamidī
- Location: Al Baha, Hejaz Mountains Origin: Saudi Arabia Countries: Oman; Jordan; Iraq; Egypt; Morocco
- Descended from: ‘Amr ibn Ka‘b ibn al-Ḥārith
- Parent tribe: Azd Shanū’ah, Azd
- Religion: Pre 630 AD (Polytheism); Post 630 AD (Islam)

The Ghamd (also transliterated as Ghamid, Arabic: غامد) is an Azd Arab tribe of the Hejaz Region. They are predominantly Sunni, and are considered one of the oldest tribes of the Arabian Peninsula. The Ghamid people are thought to be closely related to the neighboring tribe of Zahran.

The tribe's historical location is in the region of Al-Bahah in southwestern of Hejaz region of Saudi Arabia, a part of Arabia Felix ('Fortunate Arabia') which was used by geographers to describe the southern part of the Arabian peninsula, which enjoys more rainfall, is much greener than the rest of Arabia and has long enjoyed much more productive fields. Portions of the tribe also exist in Iraq, Jordan, Oman, Sudan, Egypt, the United Arab Emirates, and Yemen.

== Lineage ==
The Ghamid tribe traces its lineage back to their forefather Ghamid, who is Amr ibn Ka'b — and some say Amr ibn Abdullah ibn Ka’b — ibn Al-Harith ibn Ka'b ibn Abdullah ibn Malik ibn Nasr, who is Shanu’ah of the Azd.

Ibn al-Kalbi said: “He was named Ghamid because he covered up a matter that occurred between him and his clan, so the tribal leader of Hadur called him Ghamid.” However, Ibn al-Kalbi’s statement is considered weak and unreliable, since Ghamid lived in a period earlier before moses time than the emergence of the Aqyal (tribal leaders), which appeared between 150–300 AD.

Abu Hatim al-Sijistani and al-Asma‘i rejected Ibn al-Kalbi’s view, stating: “The derivation of the name Ghamid is not as Ibn al-Kalbi claimed, but rather from the saying ‘Ghamadtu al-bi’r Ghamdan’ (I covered the well), which means the water in it became abundant.”

Al-Qasmuli said: "Ghamid is one of the prominent tribes (jamrah) among the Arab tribes, and they are those whose nobility was not overshadowed by any other Arab tribe."

Closest tribes in lineage to Ghamid:

The closest tribes in lineage to Ghamid are the other tribes of Azd Shanu’ah, which include the Zahran tribe, Banu Lahb, and also Thamalah.

They are also referred to as Azd Shanu'ah.

Shanu'ah refers to: The descendants of Malik ibn Nasr ibn Azd ibn Al-Ghawth ibn Nabt ibn Malik ibn Zayd ibn Kahlan ibn Saba’ ibn Yashjub ibn Ya’rub ibn Qahtan, Qahtan was the son of Al-Humaysaʿ, son of Tayman, son of Nabt, son of Ishmael, son of Abraham — according to Wahb ibn Munabbih, Muhammad ibn al-Sa'ib al-Kalbi, al-Sharqi ibn al-Qitami, and Abu Bakr ibn Abi Uways.

Azd Shanou'ah are known for their light, muscular build, lean frames, and well-proportioned bodies. Muhammad even likened Moses to them.

As narrated in Sahih Muslim and Sahih al-Bukhari:

Jabir reported: The Messenger of Allah (ﷺ) said, “The prophets were presented to me, and Moses was a tall man, as if he were one of the men of Shanou’ah.”

In the commentary on this hadith, Qadi Iyad said:

“His saying (peace be upon him): ‘Moses was a tall man,’ refers to his strong and imposing physique.”

Badr al-Din al-‘Ayni, in his interpretation of Abu Huraira’s narration, explained:

“The comparison of Moses, peace be upon him, to the men of Shanou’ah is due to their notable height, strength, and brown complexion.”

== History ==
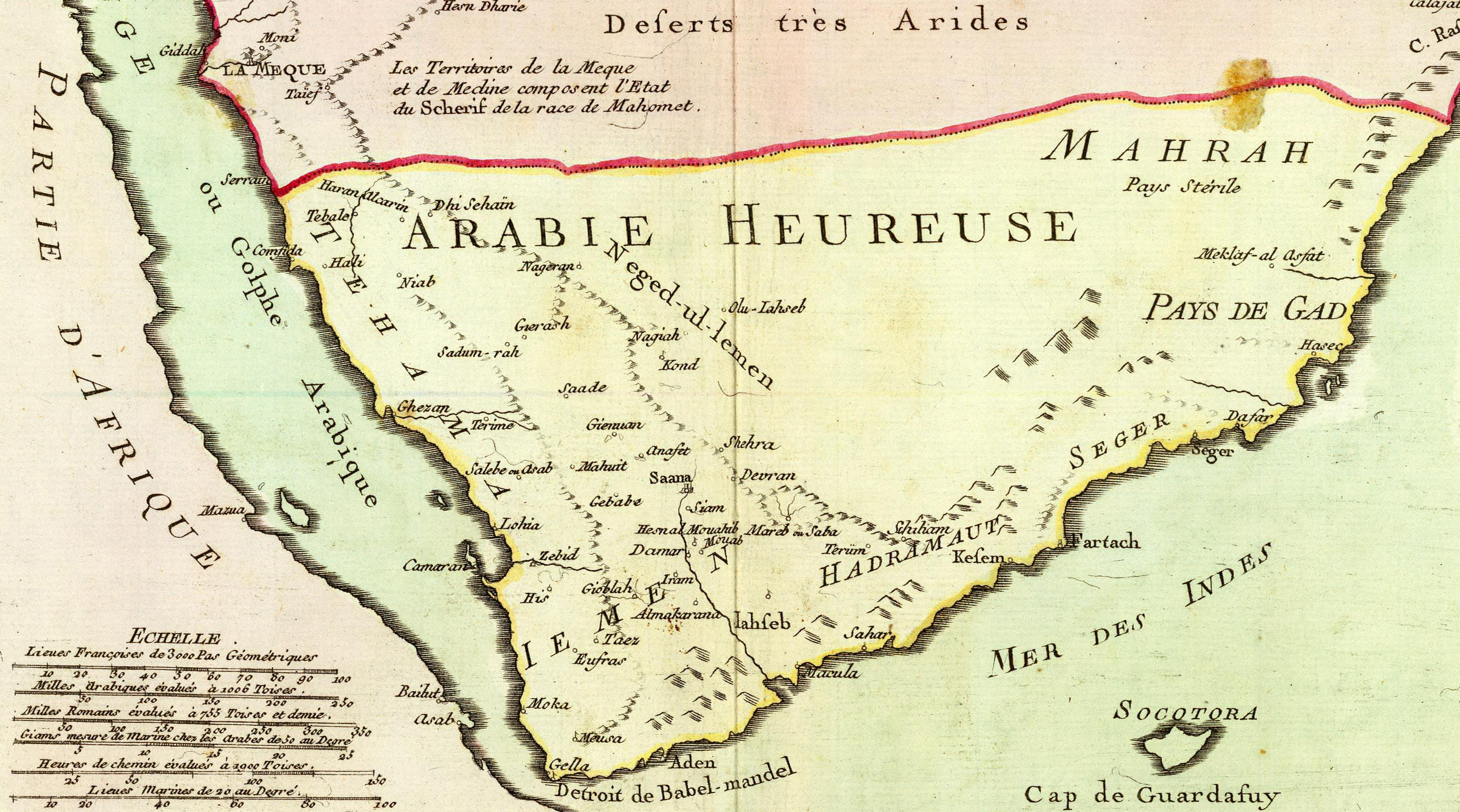
A 1787 French map of Arabie Heureuse (Arabia Felix). Al-Bahah region, which Ghamid hails from, is situated on the western northernmost part of the map.

The history of the Ghamd began in the Pre-Islamic Era, where members of the Ghamd joined the early Muslim empire.

The Ghamid Tribe had two delegations to the Prophet Muhammad:

The first delegation – in Mecca: Abi Dhibyan came to Muhammad along with a group of his people, among them:

- Al-Hajn ibn Al-Murqai‘ (Abu Sabrah)
- Mukhnaf and Abdullah, the sons of Sulayman
- ‘Abd Shams ibn ‘Afif ibn Zuhayr, whom the Prophet renamed Abdullah
- Jundub ibn Zuhayr
- Jundub ibn Ka‘b
- Al-Harith ibn Al-Harith
- Zuhayr ibn Mukhshi
- Al-Harith ibn ‘Amir

Muhammad wrote a letter for them clarifying the rights of their tribe in worldly matters after their acceptance of Islam. The document stated:

"To proceed: Whoever from Ghamid accepts Islam, shall have the same rights as Muslims, including the sanctity of his wealth and blood. They shall not be taxed (tushharu) nor tithed (tu'ashsharu), and they shall retain ownership of whatever land they embraced Islam upon."

The second delegation – in Madinah: In the 10th year after the Hijrah, a delegation of ten men from Ghamid came to the Messenger of Allah. They stayed at Al-Baqi‘, which at the time was filled with Athl (tamarisk trees) and Tarfaa’ (saltbush). They left the youngest among them at the camp and went to meet the Prophet.

While the young man was sleeping, a thief came and stole a small box ('aybah) belonging to one of them that contained clothes. When the men reached the Prophet, they greeted him and declared their Islam. The Prophet wrote for them a document regarding the rulings of Islam. He then asked:

"“Who did you leave behind at your camp?"

They said: "The youngest among us, O Messenger of Allah."

He said: "He slept through your belongings being taken, and someone came and took the small chest of one of you."

One of them said: "O Messenger of Allah, no one among us has a chest but me."

The Prophet replied: "It has been taken and returned to its place."

The men rushed back to their camp and found the young man. They asked him, and he said:

"I woke up startled and found the chest missing. I went searching and saw a man who, upon seeing me, ran. I followed him and found a spot where the sand was disturbed. I dug and retrieved the chest."

They said: "We bear witness that he is truly the Messenger of Allah, for he told us about the theft and the return of the chest." They returned to the Prophet and informed him of what happened. The young man who was left behind then embraced Islam.

Muhammad instructed Ubayy ibn Ka‘b to teach them the Qur’an, granted them the customary hospitality (ijazah) as he did with other delegations, and they departed.

History in the Pre-Islamic Era:

There is no doubt that Ghamid is one of the oldest and largest tribes in the Arabian Peninsula, and one of the few tribes that has been known by name and tribal presence since the pre-Islamic era until the present day. The tribe still resides in its homeland. The Islamic conquests had a significant impact on the demographic changes of the tribes of the Arabian Peninsula, and Ghamid is one of the tribes that was affected by this Arab Islamic expansion. Many of its members went to the Islamic frontiers for jihad, and many others migrated to the Islamic cities both east and west. The news of most of those who left the land of Hejaz from the tribe has faded.

• When Abraha the Abyssinian passed by the lands of the Azd tribe, heading towards Mecca to destroy the Kaaba, he sent cavalry to the Azd, but Ghamid confronted them and defeated them. In this, Abd Shams ibn Masruh al-Ghamidi says:

"We prevented the army from crossing our land,

And they did not approach us with an easy matter.

When they shot at us with arrows, we met them

With strong arms and swift responses.

And they were not just young men, until their arrows fell,

And they did not return from our land with a share."

=== 17th century ===
In 1638 CE, Zayd ibn Muhsin invaded Ghamid territory. The invasion ended in reconciliation.

A battle against Banu Al-harith in Bisha:

In the seventeenth century, several tribes associated with Banu Al-Harith took Tabalah, which was a part of the tribe of Khath'am. Despite the problems between Khath'am and Ghamid, Khath'am asked for assistance from the Hijaz knight Abu Dhahiba bin Jerry al-Ghamdi, who prepared 5 battalions and brought them from Wadi Bisha to Tabalah in a war of response. The land was for Khath'am and he reconciled between Bani Al-Harith and Al-Faz', and made a Sirba in the valley led by the knight Salman bin Nami Al-Ghamdi and Ali Amer Al-Ghamdi for a while until things settled between the two neighboring tribes.

The battle of 'Asir: The Sharif of Mecca, with his knights from the Ghamid tribe, invaded the Asir regions and subjugated them.

The battle of Ranyah, against the Subay' tribe: In the past, a border dispute occurred and some agreements were breached by some members of the Ghamid and Subai tribes in the eastern side of the Ranieh Valley. Due to these skirmishes continued for a period of time, the two tribes mobilized, and it became a battle that resulted in the victory of Ghamid.

Battle against the Al-Shalawi الشلاوي tribe: This battle took place after the attack of the tribes of Bani Al-Harith, and most likely it was from Al-Shalawi, after they attacked the commercial convoys of Ghamid heading to Mecca. The battle ended with the victory of the Ghamid tribe.

In the year 1678, Sharif Muhammad Al-Harith, Sharif of Mecca, used his horsemen (Knights) from Ghamid tribe, with the supervision of the Hejaz and great crowds of Arabs, for the famous battle of (Al-Dhafa'a) between the Sharif of Mecca and the tribes of Dhafir in Al-Qassim. The battle ended with the Sharif's victory over them, as the Sharif and his soldiers displaced them and expelled Al-Dhafeer from Najd and Al-Qassim to the regions of the mountain (Jabal Shammar).

At the end of the year 1678 (the Battle of Hadiya), the Sharif, along with Ghamid and Thaqif, attacked and supervised Bani Khalid in and took from them great spoils and killed among the famous Bani Khalid Saqan bin Khalaf Al Mani' Al Khalidi, the Sheikh of Al Mani' of Bani Khalid.

=== 18th century ===
In the year 1705 on the 26th of Ramadan, Sharif Saad bin Zaid came out against Sharif Abdul Karim bin Muhammad following a dispute between them. Sharif Saad sought help from Ghamid, and clashed with the defenders in the breach next to Al-Ma'alla. Sharif Saad managed to enter victoriously in Shawwal after the army of Sharif Abdul Karim fled from it.

=== 19th century ===
In 1813, the Ottoman Sultan gave Muhammad Ali Pasha supplies, provisions and weapons.

In 1814, where the famous battle in the Quraish Valley between the army of Muhammad Ali Pasha and an army from Ghamid led by the knight / Salih bin Habash and the enemy led by the Turkish / Abdin Bey consisting of twenty thousand fighters and the Turkish army was defeated, so more than a thousand fighters were killed from Muhammad Ali Pasha's army and the Turkish army withdrew to Taif.

At the end of the year, Ghamed tribe invaded the Turks and destroyed a Turkish fortress in the town of Nasiriyah in Balharith, where they seized weapons, ammunition and horses.

In 1815, Imam Faisal bin Saud descended on the town of Turbah with ten thousand fighters, and the Muslims mobilized from the Hijaz tribes and from Ghamid under the leadership of the knight Hamdan bin Hatamel until their number reached twenty five thousand fighters from all the tribes. The Turks and those with them among the Egyptians fought a fierce fight that ended in victory for Faisal and those with him were able to kill a large number of Turkish-Egyptian forces (an estimated five hundred Ottoman soldiers).

In the year 1816, after the return of Muhammad Ali Pasha to Egypt, the tribes of Ghamid and the men of al-Ma'a co-operated

Some of the Asir tribes pushed back the Turks stationed in Tihama and drove them to Taif and to Jeddah.

In the year 1817 the fall of Bani Jarrah, the victory of the village of Bani Jarrah from Bani Zibyan against an army from the Bisha tribes led by Emir Omar Al-Sa'iri, and among the most famous of the dead was Colonel Medawi Al-Qushayri from Bisha.

In 1817, a campaign came by the Turks to burn the market of Ghadana, but it defeated by Ghamid tribe.

In 1818, the people of the region participated in the campaign of Khalil Pasha and the Sharif Muhammad Ibn Aun, the governor of Mecca.

And Solomon Sanjak against Asir.

In 1823, a campaign led by Muhammad bin Aun and Ahmad Pasha came to strike Asir, but it was destroyed from Ghamid.

In 1833, Sharif Hazaa bin Aoun landed in Al Baha and warfare him, Ghamid. That same year, Ayed bin Mari arrived in Buraidah in the country of Ghamid, and on Thursday, Ghamid bin Mari participated and became Turk in Al Dhafir.

In 1837, the tribes of the southern Hijaz rebelled against the Ottoman rule and attacked the Ottoman garrisons in both Hejaz and Bilad Ghamid (Al-Bahah), after the arrival of one of the campaigns of the Asir ruler Ayed bin Mari. In 1838, they participated in Ghamid al-Sharif and defeated the army of Ayed bin Mari.

In 1848, Ghamid Ibn Ayed participated, and they broke the crowd of Sharif.

In 1851, the knight Thamer bin Thamer Al-Yassidi Al-Ghamdi breaks the knights of Sharif Abdul-Muttalib bin Ghalib and takes shelter for camels. That same year the Egyptian Hejaz campaign, which consisted of the Egyptian army, the Hijaz desert, and Harb and Mutair, was defeated at the hands of Ghamid and Asir.

In 1864, a campaign came under the leadership of the Sharif of Mecca (Abdullah bin Muhammad bin Abdul-Muin) to retake the Al-Baha region, but it failed.

In 1870, al-Ashraf led disciplinary campaigns for some tribes, and the Turkish campaign reached Al-Baha

Under the leadership of Sharif Abdullah bin Muhammad bin Abd al-Mu'in Sharif Makkah, and fierce skirmishes took place between the army and the rebellious population, which eventually led to Ibn Ayed's intervention, and thus Saeed bin Ayed managed to lead the military campaign and entered the country of Ghamid and Zahran, and was welcomed by the men of Ghamid and Zahran.

In 1872, a battle took place in the Al-Baha market between the people of Ghamid and Zahran with the Turkish forces.

The siege of Abha took place in 1882.

In the year 1895, two murders took place between the tribes of Qahtan and the Turk on one side, and Ghamid and those with them on the other side, and in them 900 of the Turks were killed and 300 were captured. Among the famous dead was Hussain bin Haif al-Rafidi al-Qahtani, who was killed with the Ottomans from Ghamid in Bilad Ghamid, and Ghamid looted 4 cannons, rifles and a bundle.

=== 20th century ===
In 1904, Ghamid joins Al-Sharif in the war against Al-Idrisi.

In 1915, the battle of Hajla against Asir.

The year 1922 put an end to the rebellion led by Hassan bin Ayedh in Asir.

In 1925, Ghamid participated in the battle of Abraq Raghama.

In 1929, the Battle of Hissar bin Fadel al-Maliki and Bani Harb from Bani Malik.

In 1932, the Idrissi rebellion in Jizan ended.

== Present day ==
Many members of this tribe have the surname Al-Ghamdi. Like many other tribes in the Arabian peninsula, numerous members of Ghamd, (Ghamdis), have emigrated in recent decades to three major metropolitan centers of Saudi Arabia; Riyadh, Jeddah, and Dammam.
