= Banu Lahab =

South Arabian tribe

Banū Lahab بنو لهب
- Qahtanite Arabs
- Ethnicity: Arab
- Nisba: al-Lahbi
- Location: Al Makhwah quarter of the Al Bahah Region, Saudi Arabia
- Descended from: Lahab al-Azdi
- Parent tribe: Azd
- Religion: Sunni Islam (formerly South Arabian polytheism)

The Banū Lahab (Arabic: بنو لهب) are a tribe of Qahtanite Arabs that are part of the Azd tribal group. They currently inhabit the towns in Al Makhwah, a governorate of the Al Bahah Region in Saudi Arabia. In pre-Islamic times, the Banu Lahab were professional soothsayers of the Arabian community. The Bani Lahab tribe still exists today. Saudi arabic Mecca Taif Al-Qunfudhah Al-Baha Abha Yemen Sultanate of Oman United Arab Emirates

== Tribal lineage ==
Genealogists have agreed that the lineage of the Banu Lahab can be traced back to a Qahtani Arab man named Lahab al-Azdi. However, they differ on his lineage:

- Ibn al-Kalbi stated that his lineage was Lahab, son of Ahjan, son of Ka'b, son of al-Harith, son of Ka'b, son of 'Abd Allah, son of Malik, son of Nasr, son of al-Azd.
- Ibn Qutaybah stated that his lineage was Lahab, son of 'Amir, son of al-Azd.

Despite inconsistencies in both reports, they agree that Lahab was descended from al-Azd, the progenitor of the Azdite tribes.

=== Related tribes ===
Banu Lahab's sibling tribes were the Banu Aslam and the Banu Qarin. Their uncle tribe was the Banu Zahran. Together with their sibling tribes and uncle tribes, the Banu Lahab are part of the larger Azd Shanu'ah confederation.

== History ==
In the pre-Islamic times, Banu Lahab held prominence in the Arabian Peninsula as convincing soothsayers, a trait which they inherited from their progenitor Lahab al-Azdi. The Banu Lahab also became the leader of the Azd tribal confederation for a short period of time until the reign of the sons of Muzayqiya. In the 7th century CE, the converted to Islam and their flagbearer and leader was al-Nu'man ibn al-Razi'ah al-Lahbi. They were known to have sent letters to the Islamic prophet Muhammad.

=== Modern history ===
The Banu Lahab currently reside in Saudi Arabia, mainly in the Al Bahah Region.

== See also ==
- Tribes of Arabia
