= Lama bint Turki Al Saud =

Saudi Arabian princess, businesswoman, and equestrian

Names
- Lama bint Turki bin Nasser bin Abdulaziz Al Saud
- House: Al Saud
- Father: Turki bin Nasser Al Saud
- Mother: Noura bint Sultan Al Saud

Lama bint Turki Al Saud (Arabic: لمى بنت تركي آل سعود) is an amateur jumper who represents Saudi Arabia in various equestrian competitions. She is a member of the Saudi royal family, and her parents are Prince Turki bin Nasser and Princess Noura bint Sultan.

Lama bint Turki has stakes in different Saudi companies, including Al Karakat company, Majd Trading and Contracting and Sana Al Fajr and Operation.
