= Abu Barza al-Aslami =

Sahabi of Muhammad and narrator of hadith

Personal life
- Born: Abdullah ibn Nadla
- Died: `65 AH Khurasan
- Known for: Companion of Prophet Muhammad, Narrator of Hadith
- Occupation: Islamic Scholar, Narrator of Hadith

Religious life
- Religion: Islam

Abū Barza al-Aslamī (Arabic: أبو برزة الأسلمي) was a Sahabi of Muhammad and a narrator of hadith. He was one of the Muhajirun and was not among those who supported Abu Bakr after the meeting at the Saqifah.

== Contributions and role in Islam ==
al-Aslami played a significant role during the Prophet's time and after his death. He narrated several hadiths and was known for his deep knowledge of Islamic teachings.

=== Prayer and worship ===
He reported various practices of the Prophet, including details about the Fajr prayer, which the Prophet recited between 60 and 100 verses.

=== Companionship with the Prophet ===
He was closely associated with the Prophet. He would often ask the Prophet about religious practices and actions that could lead to entering paradise, such as removing harmful things from people's paths.

== Key incidents and narrations ==
=== During the Prophethood ===
Abu Barza reported that the Prophet would lead the Zuhr prayer at midday and had specific times for the five daily prayers. He also shared insights into the Prophet's practices of not sleeping before the night prayer and avoiding discussions after it.

=== As a narrator of Hadith ===
Abu Barza's narrations are found in several significant Hadith collections. For example, he is cited in Sahih Muslim and Sahih Bukhari, providing valuable information about the Prophet's life and teachings.

== Later life and legacy ==
After the Prophet's death, Abu Barza continued to play a vital role in the Muslim community. He moved to different regions, including Khurasan, where he eventually died in 65 AH.
