= Mansour bin Nasser Al Saud =

- Born: 1959 (age 65–66); Riyadh, Saudi Arabia
- Alma mater: University of Salford (MA)
- House: Al Saud
- Father: Nasser bin Abdulaziz Al Saud
- Occupation: Businessman

Styles of Mansour bin Nasser bin Abdul Aziz al Saud
- Reference style: His Royal Highness
- Spoken style: Your Royal Highness

Mansour bin Nasser Al Saud is a Saudi diplomat. He acted as Saudi Arabia´s Ambassador to Switzerland and previously acted as Economical Advisor with the rank of a minister to King Abdullah bin Abdulaziz.

== Early life and education ==
Prince Mansour is a son of Prince Nasser bin Abdulaziz and his wife Samira bint Mukhtar al Sadrawi. He holds a master´s degree in philosophy of international affairs from the University of Salford in the United Kingdom.

On February 10, 2019, Prince Mansour became Saudi Arabia´s ambassador to Switzerland due to a royal decree of King Salman bin Abdulaziz Al Saud.

Previously, he served for many years as an adviser to King Abdullah with the rank of minister, a position he held until February 2015. He has advised on various economic issues affecting Saudi Arabia.

== Business ==
He is the founder of several companies, including Saudi Oil Services, Maps Geosystems, Saudi Company for International Military Services, and Izcon, which undertakes regulatory and technical examination. In these roles he is the CEO and chairman of the board of Mansour bin Nasser Holding Corp., the chairman of the board and a partner of Izcon, and a partner in Maps Geosystems.

== Reputation ==
Prince Mansour is a well respected senior Prince of the House of Saud with a significant reputation as a cosmopolitan businessman, being not affected from the 2017-2019 Saudi Arabian Purge. He is thus regarded as esteemed by the Crown Prince Muhammad bin Salman Al Saud. On the occasion of his mother´s death in May 2023, various Arab Emirs including Emir Tamim of Qatar and Emir Hamad al Sharqi from Fujairah expressed their condolences personally to Prince Mansour and his uncle King Salman.
