= Wahid Ibn Reza =

Bangladeshi film maker and producer

- Born: 27 December; Dhaka, Bangladesh
- Occupations: Engineer; Animator; Screenwriter; Film director; Actor; Poet; writer
- Years active: 2001–present
- Notable work: Rick and Morty, Game of Thrones

Wahid Ibn Reza (born 27 December) is a Bangladeshi engineer, animator, screenwriter, film director, actor, poet and writer. He works in Hollywood film and television industry in visual effects (VFX), animation and production management. He is also known in Bangladesh as a model, television presenter and actor. In 2026 his short animated film After Us won three awards at 2026 Leo Awards in Canada.

== Early life & career ==
Reza was born 27 December in Dhaka. His father Mohammad Rezaul Karim, is a professor and former state minister of Government of Bangladesh and his mother is Advocate Suraiya Karim Munni. He completed his Secondary School Certificate (SSC) from Government Laboratory High School in 1998 and his Higher Secondary Certificate (HSC) from Notre Dame College in 2000. He later earned a Bachelor of Science (BSc) degree in mechanical engineering from Bangladesh University of Engineering and Technology (BUET). He subsequently moved to Canada, where he received a Bachelor of Fine Arts (BFA) degree in Film Production from University of British Columbia.

== Career ==
He developed an interest in arts and culture during his student years. In 2001, he began working for the Bangladeshi satirical magazine Unmad, founded by cartoonist and writer Ahsan Habib. He started as a staff writer and later became an associate editor. He also appeared in several television dramas written by Humayun Ahmed. In addition to acting, he established himself in Bangladesh as a model and television presenter. He gained popularity after appearing as a model in a White Plus Toothpaste television commercial directed by Mostofa Sarwar Farooki.

From 2007, Reza became involved in writing television dramas and advertisements. He initially worked at Unitrend and Carrot Communications before joining Grey Dhaka in 2010 as Acting Copy Head.

=== Hollywood career ===
In 2013, Reza began working in Hollywood as a production assistant on the animated television series Rick and Morty at Bardel Animation Studio. He later worked at MPC (Moving Picture Company) and Method Studios in British Columbia. In 2017, he joined Sony Pictures Imageworks as an Associate Production Manager.

He has worked on several internationally known productions, including the Emmy Award-winning animated series Rick and Morty, television series Game of Thrones, and films such as Doctor Strange, Guardians of the Galaxy Vol. 2, Black Panther, and Avengers: Infinity War.

== Filmography ==
No.	Year	Film	Role	Production	Award
1	2014	Night at the Museum: Secret of the Tomb	Visual Effects Coordinator	Twentieth Century Fox (Hollywood)	–
2	2014	Exodus: Gods and Kings	Visual Effects Coordinator	Hollywood	–
3	2015	Furious 7	Visual Effects Coordinator	Universal Pictures (Hollywood)	–
4	2015	Fifty Shades of Grey	Visual Effects Coordinator	Universal Pictures (Hollywood)	–
5	2016	Doctor Strange	Visual Effects Coordinator	Marvel Studios (Hollywood)	–
6	2016	Captain America: Civil War	Visual Effects Coordinator	Marvel Studios (Hollywood)	–
7	2016	Batman v Superman: Dawn of Justice	Visual Effects Coordinator	DC Entertainment (Hollywood)	–
8	2018	Guardians of the Galaxy Vol. 2	Visual Effects Coordinator	Marvel Studios (Hollywood)	–
9	2018	Hotel Transylvania 3: Summer Vacation	Associate Production Manager	Sony Pictures (Hollywood)	–
10	2019	The Angry Birds Movie 2	Visual Effects Coordinator	Hollywood	–
11	Upcoming	Surviving 71	Visual Effects Coordinator, Producer, Director	Hollywood and Bangladesh	–

== Television ==
No.	Year	Television series	Role	Production	Award
1	2012–2013	Suits	Production Crew	Hollywood	–
2	2013	Defiance	Production Crew	Hollywood	–
3	2013–2014	Rick and Morty	Production Assistant	Hollywood	–
4	2014	Game of Thrones	Visual Effects Coordinator	Warner Bros. Television Distribution (Hollywood)	–
5	2018	Chacha Bahinir Ajob Kahini	Producer	Maverick Studio	–

== Short films and other works ==
No.	Year	Title	Role	Production	Award
1	2013	What Am I Doing Here	Actor, Writer, Director, Producer	Hollywood	Best Student Film – Surrey Film Festival
2	2014	Fools for Hire	Actor	Hollywood	Best Supporting Actor – LA Web Film Festival
3	2015	Terrorist	Producer	Hollywood	Best Student Film – FFM Montreal and Edmonton Film Festival
4	2025	After us	Director	National Film Board of Canada	Best Animation Program, Best Art Direction and Best Sound Design – 2026 Leo Awards in Canada

== Literary works ==
He has published several books, including collections of poetry, humor and satire.

Year	Title	Genre
2003	Debi	Poetry
2006	Kabya Khata	Poetry
2007	Kathopakathan	Poetry
2007	Have a Joke Please	Humour
2008	Love Bites	Humour
2009	Love Bites 2	Humour
2012	Guti Kobitar Haat	Poetry
2015	Kobita Sankranti	Poetry
2019	Self Deprecating Humor	Satire and humour

== Notable works ==
Reza produced Chacha Bahinir Ajob Kahini, Bangladesh's first 3D animated television series. Inspired by his father, who was a freedom fighter, he also created Surviving 71, Bangladesh's first hand-drawn 2D animated feature film based on the Bangladesh Liberation War.
