= Mohammed ibn Abdessalam ibn Nasir =

Moroccan writer

Abu Abdallah Mohammed ibn Abdessalam ibn Nasir (Arabic: محمد بن عبد السلام بن ناصر; died 1824) was a Moroccan writer. He was a leading scholar at the beginning of the 19th century belonging to the sufi order of the Nasiris. He is the author of two rihlas (travel accounts). Among the other works he wrote is Al-Mazaya fi-ma hudditha min al-bida'a bi-Umm al-Zawaya (The merits of what is told of heresies among the mother of zawiyas). Ibn Abdessalam Ben Nasir worked under Slimane of Morocco as an intellectual ambassador to the Middle East.
