= Turki bin Nasser Al Saud =

Saudi military officer and royal (1948–2021)

State Minister for Environmental Issues
- In office: 2001 – 18 August 2013
- Successor: Abdulaziz bin Omar Al Jaser
- Born: 14 April 1948; Riyadh, Saudi Arabia
- Died: 30 January 2021 (aged 72)
- Burial: 31 January 2021; Riyadh
- Spouse: Noura bint Sultan Al Saud
Names
- Turki bin Nasser bin Abdulaziz bin Abdul Rahman Al Saud
- House: Al Saud
- Father: Nasser bin Abdulaziz
- Mother: Muhdi bint Ahmed Al Sudairi

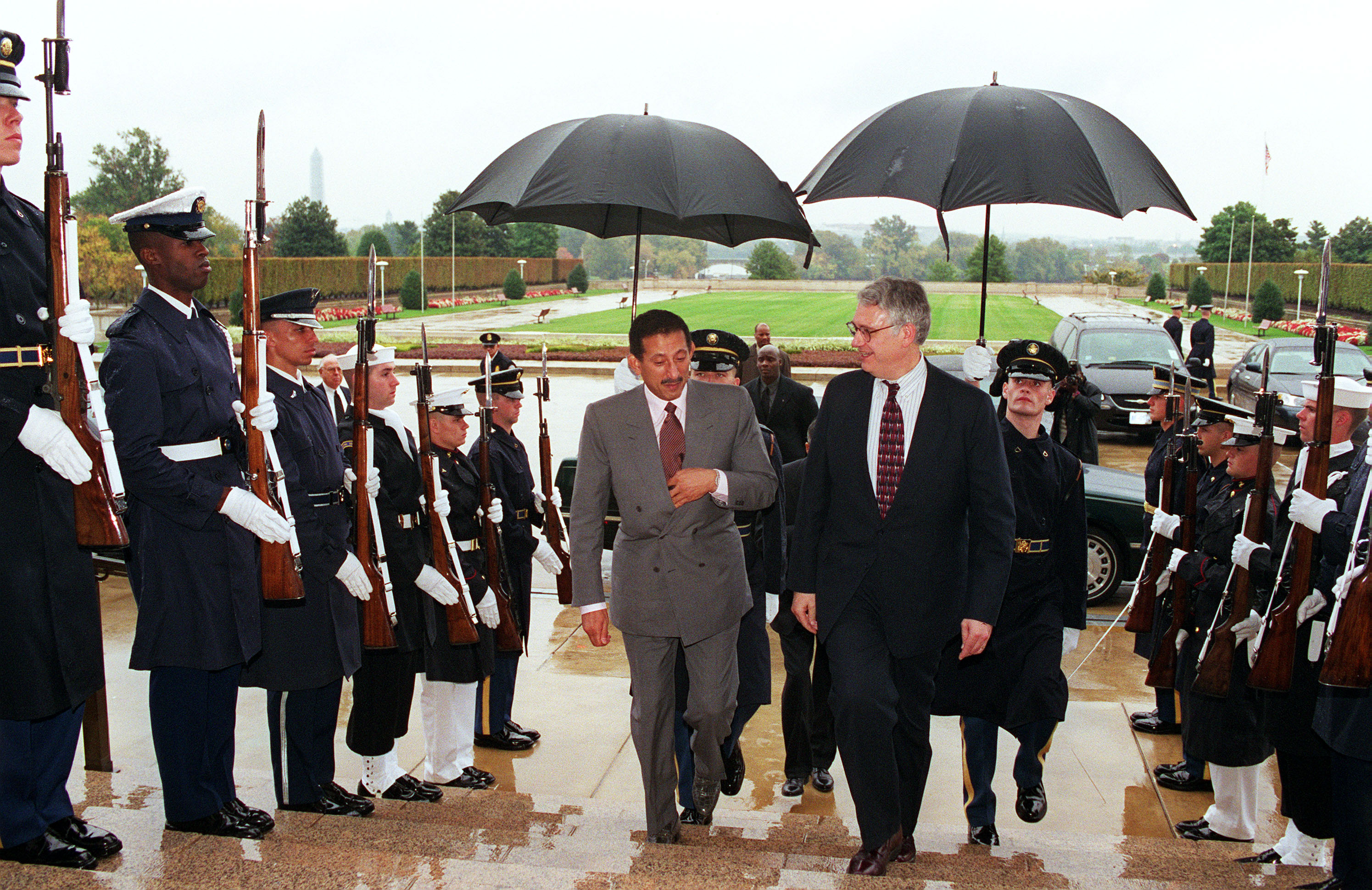
U. S. Deputy Secretary of Defense John H. Hamre (right) escorts Turki bin Nasser (left) through an honor cordon into the Pentagon on Oct. 20, 1999.

Turki bin Nasser Al Saud (Arabic: تركي بن ناصر آل سعود; 14 April 1948 – 30 January 2021) was a Saudi military officer, who served as the head of the presidency of meteorology and environment as well as state minister for environmental issues in Saudi Arabia. He was a member of the House of Saud and one of the grandsons of Saudi's founder King Abdulaziz.

== Early life and education ==
Turki bin Nasser was born in Riyadh on 14 April 1948. He was the seventh son of Nasser bin Abdulaziz, who had been excluded from succession due to "dissolute" mores. His mother was Muhdi bint Ahmed bin Mohammed Al Sudairi, an aunt of the Sudairi brothers.

Turki bin Nasser held a bachelor degree and a master's degree in political science, both from the US War College. Furthermore, he received various military courses in the United States and the United Kingdom and also participated in six sessions of aviation courses in Saudi Arabia.

== Career ==
Turki bin Nasser was assigned as flying officer with the rank of lieutenant at King Abdulaziz Air Base in Eastern Province in 1966. He became acting commander at the Transitional Training Unit in 1975. He then served as a commander from 1976 to 1984 at three different units; namely, Thirteen Squadron (1976), 3rd Flying Wing (1978) and King Abdulaziz Air Base in the Eastern Region (1984). From 1989 to 1994, he served as Al Yamamah project officer. He was the commander of the Dhahran Air Base during the Gulf War in 1990-91. Next, he became chief of air staff operations, peace shield project and peace hawk project in 1994. Prince Turki began to serve as deputy commander at the Royal Saudi Air Force in 1996 and became a commander with the rank of general at the Force. Just before his retirement from the Force, Turki bin Nasser was its deputy commander-in-chief.

After leaving his military post, King Fahd appointed Turki bin Nasser as the head of the presidency of meteorology and environment, responsible for the protection of the environment and the conservation and development of natural resources in Saudi Arabia. He was also appointed special advisor to Prince Sultan in 2000. In 2001, Turki bin Nasser was made state minister for environmental affairs.

Prince Turki was also the chairman of the Saudi environmental society. He was the chairman of the board of directors of the Saudi charity association for autism in Jeddah. A new center, Prince Nasser bin Abdulaziz Center for autism, affiliated to Saudi charity association for autism, was opened in Riyadh in April 2012.

On 18 August 2013, a royal order was issued by King Abdullah to appoint Abdulaziz Al Jaser as head of presidency of meteorology and environment, replacing Prince Turki bin Nasser in the post.

== Wealth ==
The wealth of Prince Turki was estimated to be $1 billion before his death. It was reported by The Guardian that Turki bin Nasser owned nearly 200 classic cars, a £20m private Boeing business jet, a large yacht, Sarah, and a mansion in Beverly Hills which he intended to sell in June 2020. He sold his yacht just before his death. He also had several houses in different cities such as Jeddah, Barcelona, Riyadh, Dhahran and London. His London home was in Sussex Square near Hyde Park.

Prince Turki was the owner of Fairmont Rey Juan Carlos I hotel in Barcelona, which he put up for sale in late October 2020. He had owned the property since its opening in 1992.

== Membership ==
Turki bin Nasser was Godfather of Al Qadsieh Saudi club. He became an honorary member of Al Nasr Saudi football club in 2008, and he resigned from the post in 2016. He was the chief executive officer of the Council of Arab Ministers responsible for the environment. He was also a member of the board of governors of the Saudi Wildlife Commission.

== Controversy ==
It was reported that Turki bin Nasser had allegedly received most from BAE's £60 m slush fund. It was further stated that he received at least £1 bn through an anonymous offshore company, Poseidon, that was linked to Lebanese politician Mohammad Safadi who had been finance minister of Lebanon since June 2011. His name was linked with allegations of under-the-counter commission deals in the £50 bn al Yamamah contracts, which began under the administration of Margaret Thatcher in the 1980s. Thereafter, in 2005, Prince Turki bin Nasser became the focal center of the related investigation carried out by the United Kingdom's Serious Fraud Office.

Gardiner, the owner of a travel agency meeting the needs of BAE and its Saudi customers, declared that he had disbursed the money and much of it went to Turki bin Nasser, then-head of the Saudi Air Force and a major BAE customer. Other funds were also used indirectly for him, specifically for the honeymoon of Bandar bin Sultan’s daughter, Reema bint Bandar, who was formerly married to Prince Turki's son Faisal bin Turki. It is further argued that Prince Turki's daughter was given a wedding video whose production cost BAE almost 200,000 pounds. One of the other allegations was that the wife of Prince Turki bin Nasser, Noura bint Sultan, was alleged to have received a 170,000 pound Rolls-Royce as a birthday present, flown out to Saudi Arabia in a cargo plane chartered by BAE. Another was about the arrangement of a 2 million pound three-month holiday for him and his family.

Turki bin Nasser was also mentioned in the Panama Papers due to his relation to HoneyBee Assets Limited.

== Arrest ==
On 4 November 2017, Turki bin Nasser Al Saud was arrested in a corruption crackdown conducted by a newly established royal anti-corruption committee. In January 2018, he was released.

== Personal life ==
Turki bin Nasser married Noura bint Sultan, daughter of Prince Sultan bin Abdulaziz. He had two sons and five daughters with Noura. Turki bin Nasser also had five other sons.

His eldest son is Faisal bin Turki. His daughter, Areej bint Turki, opened an iCafe, Areej art cafe, in Riyadh in late May 2012. Another daughter, Lama bint Turki, is an amateur equestrian jumper representing Saudi Arabia.

== Death ==
Turki bin Nasser died on 30 January 2021. Funeral prayers for him were performed in Riyadh on 31 January.

== Honors and awards ==
Turki bin Nasser was awarded various national and international honors and awards, including the Order of Abdulaziz Al Saud (First class), Kuwait Liberation Medal, the Pakistani Military Excellence Star Decoration, Order of Merit of the American Commander Rank (Medal of Merit), National Order of Merit (Commander rank) and the French Medal of Honor (Cavalryman rank).
