= Abdulrahman Al-Ghamdi (footballer, born 1986) =

Saudi Arabian footballer

Personal information
- Full name: Abdulrahman Al-Ghamdi
- Date of birth: August 10, 1986 (age 40)
- Place of birth: Saudi Arabia
- Height: 1.92 m (6 ft 4 in)
- Position: Goalkeeper

Senior career*
| Years | Team | Apps | (Gls) |
| 2007–2010 | Al-Riyadh | ? | (?) |
| 2010–2014 | Al-Shoalah | 2 | (2) |
| 2014–2016 | Al Kawkb | | |
| 2016–2019 | Al-Selmiyah | | |
| 2019–2020 | Al-Sharq | | |
- * Club domestic league appearances and goals

Abdulrahman Al-Ghamdi is a Saudi Arabian football player.
