= Saud bin Abdulaziz bin Nasser =

Saudi Arabian prince and murderer (born 1977)

Saud bin Abdulaziz bin Nasser Al Saud
- Born: 1977 (age 48–49); Riyadh
- Parent(s): Abdulaziz bin Nasser bin Abdulaziz Al Saud (father); Fayza bint Saud Al Saud (mother)
- Criminal charge: Aggravated murder
- Penalty: Life imprisonment

Details
- Imprisoned at: Saudi jail since 2013

Saud bin Abdulaziz bin Nasser Al Saud (Arabic: سعود بن عبد العزيز بن ناصر بن عبد العزيز آل سعود, born 1977) is a princely member of the Saudi royal family and a convicted murderer. He is a grandson of King Saud.

== Murder and imprisonment ==
In February 2010, he was found guilty at the Old Bailey of murdering his Sudanese servant Bandar Abdulaziz in their suite at the Landmark Hotel in London.

During the trial, it was purported that the prince had received a sexual massage from the male escort Mr. Louis Szikora for the fee of £200 per hour three days before the murder, and that he and Abdulaziz had been engaged in a homosexual relationship.

Accordingly, it was also alleged that the murder was a culmination of an extremely abusive "Master–Slave" relationship. The prince maintained that he and his victim were "friends and equals", and denied an alleged homosexual relationship between the two.

However, prosecutor Jonathan Laidlaw stated that the evidence found – including naked photographs stored on a cellular phone and traces of semen on the victim's underwear – "establishes quite conclusively that (Al Saud) was either gay or had homosexual inclinations. Prosecutor Jonathan Laidlaw also said the prince had abused his aide in the past, showing jurors a video shot in the Landmark's elevator which appears to show the shaven-headed prince, dressed in white, throwing his 32-year-old servant around and battering him.

On 20 October 2010, Saud Abdulaziz bin Nasser al Saud was sentenced to life imprisonment and was ordered to serve a minimum of 20 years for strangling and beating Bandar Abdulaziz to death. In March 2013, he was allowed to return to Saudi Arabia to serve the remainder of his term in a Saudi prison.

According to the diplomatic agreement signed between the United Kingdom and Saudi Arabia, he must serve at least twenty years (2030) before he can be released.
