= Saqifa =

Meeting on the succession to Muhammad

The Saqifa (Arabic: سَقِيفَة, romanized: Saqīfah) was an assembly held shortly after the death of the Islamic prophet Muhammad in 632, at which Abu Bakr was chosen as his successor and became the first caliph. The Saqifa meeting is among the most controversial events in Islam, due to the exclusion of a large number of Muhammad's companions, including his family and notably Ali, his cousin and son-in-law. Ali and a large number of Muhammad's family were still at the prophet's funeral when the event took place.

Sunni Muslims hold that Muhammad left the choice of his successor to the community, and therefore regard Abu Bakr's selection by companions as legitimate. Shia Muslims maintain that Ali had already been designated as Muhammad's successor at the event of Ghadir Khumm, and therefore regard the events at Saqifa as having bypassed his rightful succession. The succession crisis became the initial cause of the division among Muslims that led to the emergence of the two main Islamic branches, Sunni and Shia.

== Historiography ==
The Arabic word saqifa denotes a covered communal place for conversation but the term is synonymous in historical texts with the specific meeting immediately after Muhammad's death in which his succession was debated.

=== Biased reports ===
The earliest reports about the Saqifa affair were put into writing in the first half of the second century AH or later. By this time, the Muslim community was already firmly divided into Sunni and Shia camps. As a result, the reports of the Sunni Ibn Sa'd (d. 230/845), al-Baladhuri (d. 279/892), and even al-Tabari (d. 310/923) reflect the Sunni beliefs, while those authors with Shia sympathies favored their views, including Ibn Ishaq (d. 151/768), al-Ya'qubi (d. 284/897-8), and al-Mas'udi (d. 345/956). Jafri thus emphasizes the need for surveying all reports to obtain a sound account of the event.

For instance, Ibn Sa'd presents a highly polemic account of the Saqifa affair in his Kitab al-Tabaqat al-kabir, where Ali is absent in particular. Jafri regards him as a pioneer of the Sunni "pious" technique, which preserves only the best qualities of companions and suppresses any controversial reports. Similarly, the late works of the Shia al-Tabarsi (d. 548/1153) and al-Majlesi (d. 1699) are polemic in nature with little historical value, claims Jafri.

=== Centrality of Ibn Ishaq ===
The earliest report is that of Ibn Ishaq in his Sirat rasul Allah, the recension of which by the Sunni Ibn Hisham (d. 218/833) has reached us. Uncharacteristically, Ibn Hisham refrains from modifying Ibn Ishaq's account of the Saqifa affair, which is thus a report written by a Shia author and approved by a Sunni editor-critic. Ibn Ishaq's account is the basis of the contemporary studies of Jafri and Madelung.

=== Other authors ===
In his Ansab al-ashraf, the Sunni al-Baladhuri partly follows Ibn Sa'd's pious technique but also retains some of the controversial material about the Saqifa event in favor of Ali. On the other hand, the contentious content in the work of the Shia al-Ya'qubi is often dismissed by later Sunni authors as fabricated, while Jafri views his work as a valuable collection of documents which survived the tendentious efforts of the Sunni majority historians, who largely suppressed or dismissed divergent views. Madelung similarly believes that the Shia or Sunni partiality of a report alone does not imply its fabrication. The account of the Saqifa meeting by al-Tabari is mostly balanced and unbiased, notes Jafri, and the most detailed, writes Ayoub (d. 2021).

=== Ibn Abbas ===
The main narrator of the Saqifa event is Ibn Abbas (d. 68/687-8), Muhammad's cousin and an authority in Medina's scholarly circles. He witnessed the event himself and also received the first-hand account of his father Abbas, who was politically active then. Madelung accepts the authenticity of Ibn Abbas' narration, noting that it reflects his characteristic view point. The bulk of Ibn Abbas' narration concerns a Friday sermon by Umar in 23/644. Though this is omitted from most Sunni reports, Madelung and Jafri are confident that the second caliph delivered the speech to discourage those who might have planned to back Ali's nomination as caliph after Umar.

== Event ==
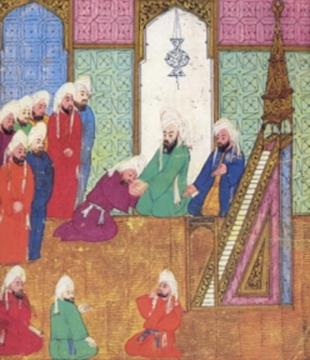
Vowing to Abu Bakr at the Saqifa, with Umar on the right. Persian miniature created circa 1595.

During Muhammad's lifetime, Muslims in Medina were divided into two groups: the Muhajirun, who had converted to Islam in Mecca and migrated to Medina with Muhammad, and the Ansar, who were originally from Medina and had invited Muhammad to govern their city.

=== Ansar's meeting ===
In the immediate aftermath of Muhammad's death in 11/632, a gathering of the Ansar took place at the Saqifa (lit. 'courtyard') of the Banu Sa'ida clan, while his close relatives prepared for the burial. The conventional wisdom is that the Ansar met there to decide on a new leader for the Muslim community among themselves, with the intentional exclusion of the Muhajirun. This is also what Umar stated in his speech. The leading candidate was possibly Sa'd ibn Ubada, a companion of Muhammad and a chief of the Banu Khazraj, the majority tribe of the Ansar, who was sick on that day.

For Madelung, the absence of the Muhajirun instead indicates that the Ansar met to re-establish their control over Medina under the belief that the Muhajirun would mostly return to Mecca after Muhammad. Alternatively, Jafri suspects that the Ansar met preemptively because they were fearful of Meccan domination and possibly aware of their designs for leadership.

=== Abu Bakr at the Saqifa ===
Among three available traditions, Jafri chooses the one that appears in nearly all of his sources, according to which the news of the Saqifa meeting reached Abu Bakr, Umar, and Abu Ubaida when they were most likely in the house of Abu Ubaida, possibly to discuss the leadership crisis. Arnold and Jafri are confident that Abu Bakr and Umar had earlier planned or formed an alliance in anticipation of Muhammad's death, while Madelung attributes the planning only to Abu Bakr. In Ibn Ishaq's report, someone then informs Abu Bakr and Umar about the Saqifa meeting, "If you want to have command of the people, then take it before their [the Ansar's] action becomes serious." The two then rushed to the Saqifa, accompanied by Abu Ubaida, perhaps to prevent any unexpected development. Some encouraged the three men not to do so but they pressed on anyway, reports Umar.

Umar narrates that "the Muhajirun" joined Abu Bakr, and then Umar suggested they go to the Ansar gathered at the Saqifa. Madelung rejects this, noting that Abu Bakr, Umar, and Abu Ubaida were the only members of the Muhajirun in the Saqifa meeting, possibly accompanied by a few relatives and clients. For Madelung, the near absence of the Muhajirun at the Saqifa also explains why there are no other reports about the event, arguing that the Ansar must have been reluctant to recount their defeat later.

=== Abu Bakr's remarks ===
Once there, Umar says he "realized that they [the Ansar] intended to cut us off from our root [i.e., the Quraysh] and to usurp the rule from us." Abu Bakr then rose and warned the Ansar that Arabs will not recognize the rule of anyone outside of Muhammad's tribe, the Quraysh. The Muhajirun, Abu Bakr argued, were the best of Arabs in lineage and location, as quoted by Ibn Ishaq. Abu Bakr also noted that the Muhajirun had accepted Islam earlier and were closer to Muhammad in kinship, adds al-Baladhuri. The Quraysh's relation with Muhammad is also noted by al-Ya'qubi and al-Tabari, and also by the contemporary Momen. Madelung, however, considers it unlikely that Abu Bakr brought up the Quraysh's kinship with Muhammad as that would have invited questions about the rights of the Banu Hashim, Muhammad's clan and his closest kin.

Returning to Ibn Ishaq's account, Abu Bakr then reportedly invited the Ansar to choose Umar or Abu Ubaida as Muhammad's successor. Umar reports that he was displeased with this offer because he considered Abu Bakr to be more entitled to rulership than himself. Madelung regards this as a manoeuvre by Abu Bakr to present himself as an acceptable alternative to Umar and Abu Ubaida for the Ansar, adding that Abu Ubaida lacked prominence while Umar had apparently just discredited himself before the meeting by publicly denying Muhammad's death.

=== Violence at the Saqifa ===
Ibn Ishaq's account continues that Habab ibn Mundhir, a veteran of the Battle of Badr, countered Abu Bakr with the suggestion that the Quraysh and the Ansar should choose their separate rulers among themselves. A heated argument then followed, reports Umar, until he asked Abu Bakr to stretch his hand and pledged allegiance to him. Others followed suit, he claims, adding that, "Then we jumped upon Sa'd until one of them called out: 'You killed Sa'd ibn Ubada.' I said, 'May God kill Sa'd.'"

The outburst of violence at the Saqifa indicates that a substantial number of the Ansar must have initially refused to follow Umar's lead, writes Madelung. Otherwise, he argues, there would have been no need to beat up their chief Sa'd ibn Ubada. Sa'd remained defiant until his murder by a "jinn" during the reign of Umar, possibly at the instigation of the second caliph.

== Ali ==
=== Absence from the Saqifa ===
Muhammad's cousin and son-in-law was preparing Muhammad's body for burial, alongside other close relatives, and was likely unaware of the ongoing Saqifa meeting. Following Umar's pledge to Abu Bakr, the Saqifa account of the Kufan al-Nakha'i (d. 96/714-15) adds, "But the Ansar, or some of them, said: 'We will not swear allegiance to anyone but Ali.'" Caetani dismisses this report because of its Shia coloring, while Madelung accepts it, noting that al-Nakha'i is not known for Shia sympathies and his account is otherwise distinctly Sunni. Similarly, al-Ya'qubi writes that the Ansar al-Mundhir ibn Arqam interrupted the proceedings and nominated Ali for succession. The contemporary Jafri, Lalani, and Momen state that some advocated the case of Ali at the Saqifa.

Madelung is not certain whether the succession of Ali was discussed at the Saqifa but considers it likely, commenting that the Ansar would have naturally turned to Ali because of their family ties with the prophet. (Note: Wife of Hashim, mother of Abd al-Muttalib, was Salma bint Amr of the Khazraj tribe.) Umar in his sermon explained that they had pressed the Ansar for an immediate oath of allegiance at the Saqifa because, he claimed, they might have had otherwise elected one of their own to succeed Muhammad. Referring to this claim, Madelung suggests that Umar was partly fearful that the Ansar would put forward the case of Ali among themselves. This is also a proposal entertained by McHugo.

=== The case for Ali ===
==== Shura ====
Madelung is of the view that a broad shura, in which Ali was to be on option, would have led to the election of Ali. He suggests that the Ansar would have supported Ali because of their family ties with Muhammad. Among the Muhajirun, the candidacy of Ali would have likely been supported by the powerful Abd Shams clan of the Quraysh because of their close ties with the Banu Hashim and despite their conflicts. Their chief Abu Sufyan indeed offered his support to Ali after the appointment of Abu Bakr, but was turned down by Ali who said he was concerned about the unity of the nascent Islam. The joint support of the Ansar and Abd Shams would have carried Ali to the caliphate, conjectures Madelung. He adds that the straightforward logic of dynastic succession would have likely prevailed in a general shura in favor of Ali. Some others similarly consider it likely that Ali would have been elected in a formal assembly.

==== Merits ====
In terms of merits, the same arguments that favored Abu Bakr over the Ansar (kinship, service to Islam, lineage, etc.) would have likely favored Ali over Abu Bakr, as often evoked by Shia authors in support of Ali's right to succession. For Jafri, the Sunni arguments that justify Abu Bakr's caliphate on the basis that he led the prayer in Muhammad's final days reflect later theological developments. He also finds the related traditions to be confused and contradictory. In the same vein, Lecomte writes that Muhammad respected Abu Bakr but considers the prayer story inconclusive because it does not formally relate to the political leadership of the community. Shaban goes further and assigns no significance to the prayer story, saying that Muhammad had frequently delegated this task to others in the past.

==== Youth ====
A common argument by Sunni and Western scholars is that the young Ali, aged about thirty at the time, could have not been a serious candidate for the caliphate. This is the view of Veccia Vaglieri, Lammens, and also Shaban, who suggests that Ali was untried for the responsibility. In contrast, Aslan argues that Ali regularly took key responsibilities despite his youth when Muhammad was alive. Alternatively, Madelung argues that Ali's youth would have only mattered if there had been an agreement on the hereditary succession to Muhammad.

==== In the Quran ====
Families of the past prophets are given a prominent role in the Quran. After the past prophets, their kin are selected by God as the spiritual and material heirs to the prophets in the Quran. Muhammad's family (Ahl al-Bayt) similarly enjoys an eminent position in the Quran. As such, insofar as the Quran reflects the views of Muhammad, Madelung argues that he could have not seen his succession differently from the past prophets or considered Abu Bakr as his natural successor. Jafri develops a similar line of argument. This is also the Shia view.

=== Ali's views ===
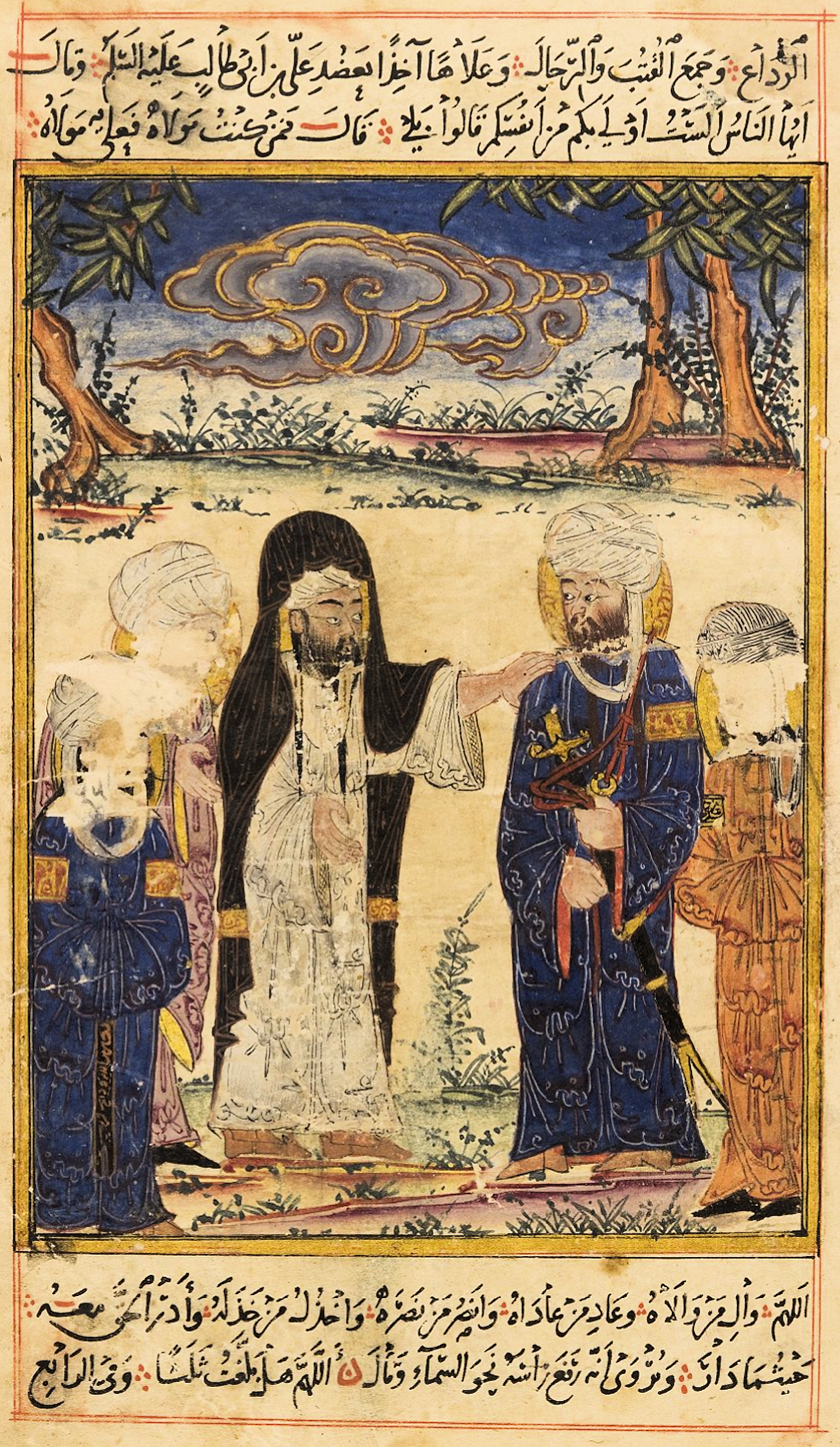
The Investiture of Ali at Ghadir Khumm in a 14th-century copy of al-Biruni's Chronology of Ancient Nations

Veccia Vaglieri is uncertain whether Ali actually hoped to succeed Muhammad because he made no effort in Sunni sources to seize the rule, despite being advised to do so by Abbas and Abu Sufyan. Alternatively, Ayoub describes the mild opposition of Ali in Sunni sources as apologetic. He and some others maintain that Ali viewed himself as the most qualified person to lead the Muslim community after Muhammad by virtue of his merits and his kinship with Muhammad. These authors argue that Ali eventually relinquished his claims to the caliphate for the sake of the unity of a nascent Islam in crisis when it became clear that Muslims did not broadly support his cause. Had the Muslim community favored Ali, Madelung suggests, he would have no longer considered the caliphate just as his right, but also as his duty. Indeed, in speeches and letters attributed to Ali, it is repeatedly emphasized that the leadership of the Muslim community is the prerogative of the family of Muhammad (Ahl al-Bayt).

Mavani, Madelung, and Shah-Kazemi add that Ali further considered himself as the designated successor of Muhammad through a divine decree at the Ghadir Khumm. Ayoub disagrees, but concedes that Ali and some others indeed considered him as the most qualified to lead. To support his claims, Madelung cites a Sunni statement attributed to Ali when he pledged allegiance to Abu Bakr after a long delay. He also notes that Ali publicly referred to the Ghadir Khumm after his ascension to the caliphate in 656. Mavani similarly cites some Sunni and Shia reports, including the proceedings of the electoral council in 644 when Ali refused to be bound by the precedence of the first two caliphs. Another report by al-Tabari indicates that Ali again publicly excluded the practices of Abu Bakr and Umar from the Sunna (of Muhammad) when his supporters pledged their allegiance to him in Kufa.

Madelung holds that Ali's views about succession mostly match the Shia beliefs today, and Lalani and Daftary have similar opinions, whereas Veccia Vaglieri considers Shia beliefs to be fabricated because Ali "showed no inclination to legitimism." By contrast, some others detail the public opposition of Ali to the appointment of Abu Bakr at the Saqifa. Even though Ali most likely did not give up his claims to the caliphate, it seems that he accepted the first three caliphs as administrators and rulers. Indeed, Madelung highlights some Sunni hadiths, according to which Ali praised Abu Bakr and Umar, while some others note the Sunni tendency to minimize and neutralize the conflicts among companions after Muhammad, particularly about the Saqifa affair. In Waq'at Siffin and some other early Shia sources, Ali contrasts the corruption of the third caliph, Uthman, with the political leadership of Abu Bakr and Umar, even though he rejects their religious legitimacy. A related example is the account of the negotiations before the Battle of Siffin (657) by Ibn Muzahim (d. 827-8), which quotes Ali as saying that Abu Bakr and Umar had governed justly, even though they had assumed the caliphate wrongfully. Mavani and Maria M. Dakake suggest that Ali viewed the succession of Abu Bakr as a digression which turned into a full-blown deviation with the rebellion of Mu'awiya during his own caliphate. This is also the Shia view, as represented by the Shia jurist Ruhollah Khomeini (d. 1989).

== Tribal politics ==
=== Banu Aws ===
A question can be raised as to what enabled a handful of the Muhajirun to force their will upon the Ansar at the Saqifa. Ibn Ishaq and Caetani attribute this to an earlier collusion between the Muhajirun and the Banu Aws, the rival tribe of the Banu Khazraj among the Ansar. Madelung rejects this as unlikely but suggests that Usaid ibn Hudair, a chief of the Banu Aws, must have backed Abu Bakr at the Saqifa and carried with him the majority of the Aws, as also apparent from a related report by al-Tabari. Jafri likewise suggests that the deep-rooted enmity between the minority Banu Aws and the majority Banu Khazraj made it preferable for the former to instead submit to the Qurayshite rule. Momen has a similar opinion, and Ayoub regards the rivalry between the Banu Khazraj and the Banu Aws as the decisive factor in the appointment of Abu Bakr, who reportedly reminded the Ansar about this rivalry in the Saqifa account of the Sunni al-Jahiz (d. 869), thus rekindling their pre-Islamic conflict, according to Ayoub.

=== Banu Khazraj ===
The position of the Banu Khazraj was further weakened by internal rivalries, particularly between their chief Sa'd ibn Ubada and his cousin Bashr ibn Sa'd. The latter was among the first to break ranks and support Abu Bakr. Once an agreement over Abu Bakr was nearly reached, Jafri believes that the Khazraj found it unwise to lag behind and risk losing favor with the new ruler.

=== Banu Taym ===
Jafri suggests that the rivalries among the larger clans within the Muhajirun made it easier for them to accept the rule of Abu Bakr, who belonged to the small clan of Banu Taym.

=== Banu Aslam ===
Madelung and Caetani both hold that a decisive factor for Abu Bakr was the timely arrival of the Banu Aslam tribe in Medina with great numbers that filled the streets of Medina. The Banu Aslam tribe were known for their hostility towards the Ansar and readily supported Abu Bakr's bid for power. Umar would often point out, "It was only when I saw the Banu Aslam that I became certain of [our] victory." It is not known today whether this happened by chance or the Banu Aslam were tipped off about the Ansar's ambitions.

=== Banu Hashim ===
==== Jealousy ====
Muhammad's clan, the Banu Hashim, and particularly his notable uncle Abbas supported the succession of Ali. Aslan suggests that the exclusion of Ali from the Saqifa affair was deliberate and reflected the fear among the Quraysh that combining the prophethood and the caliphate in the Banu Hashim would have made them too powerful. A conversation to this effect between the Hashemite Ibn Abbas and Umar is cited by Momen and Madelung. The former author voices a similar view to Aslan, while the latter acknowledges the "jealousy of the Quraysh," but believes that the simple logic of dynastic succession would have nevertheless prevailed in a broad shura in favor of Ali. For Keaney, the Meccan elite were concerned that Ali's caliphate would have kept the future leadership of the community out of their hands and within the Banu Hashim.

==== Hereditary succession ====
Lammens believes that Arabs disliked hereditary leadership while Madelung limits this attitude to Bedouin Arabs. Among the Quraysh, he argues, hereditary leadership was not uncommon, reflecting their belief that noble qualities were inherited. This view is echoed by Aslan. Afsaruddin and Sharon maintain that kinship was not a factor in early Islam whereas Amir-Moezzi and Mavani have challenged this point. In particular, Mavani writes that tribal values were deeply entrenched in the Arab society of that time, according to which kinship and noble lineage were the primary marks of identity and source of authority. Keaney believes that leadership was hereditary in the traditional Arab society and something that ran in families in a broad sense of the word. Lewis (d. 2018) says that the Arab tradition was to choose the sheikh from a single family. However, Ali was Muhammad's cousin and son-in-law which, he claims, carries little weight.

== Falta ==
Ibn Ishaq and Ibn Hisham narrate that Umar in his speech famously said, "The oath of allegiance for Abu Bakr was a falta [i.e., a precipitate and ill-considered deal], but God averted the evil of it." Alternatively, the Sunni al-Baladhuri quotes Umar in his Ansab as saying, "By God, the oath of allegiance for Abu Bakr was no falta," adding that Muhammad had already designated Abu Bakr as his successor. In another narration by al-Baladhuri, Umar calls it a lie that the Saqifa affair was a falta. Madelung rejects both of the reports by al-Baladhuri as highly unlikely.

=== Legitimacy ===
Madelung suspects that Umar considered the Saqifa affair a falta because it excluded from decision making the majority of the Muhajirun and particularly Muhammad's kin, whose participation was vital for a legitimate outcome. Possibly because of its questionable legal authority, Umar also warned Muslims in his speech against ever following the example of Saqifa. Similar concerns are raised by Abbas and Momen. Walker adds that Muhammad's relatives were disgruntled by Abu Bakr's hasty appointment which denied them a voice in the matter.

Jafri notes the prominence of Abu Bakr but comments that his appointment was the decision of a group of companions, hastily forced upon others, and its success was due to the delicate group conflicts in Medina. Some contemporary authors have further criticized the Saqifa affair as a "backroom deal" and a "coup" which was heavily influenced by the pre-Islamic tribal politics. The evil of the falta which, Umar thought, had been averted by God would erupt later in the form of the First Fitna, suggests Madelung.

== Consolidation ==
Umar in his sermon asserted that "the necks of all Muslims were stretched [in obedience] for Abu Bakr," though Madelung considers it more likely that his authority was highly precarious at first. After the Saqifa meeting, Abu Bakr reportedly headed to the Prophet's Mosque and gave his inaugural speech there. Abbas and Hazleton comment that Muhammad was already buried by this time, with the exclusion of Abu Bakr from the funeral rites. With the help of the Banu Aslam and Banu Aws tribes, Umar is then said to have dominated the streets to secure the pledges of allegiance from the Medinans, according to Madelung. In chronological order, Abu Bakr obtained the backing of Uthman and of the Banu Umayyad, of Sa'd and Abd al-Rahman ibn Awf, of the Banu Zuhra, of Zubayr, and finally of Ali.

=== Ali's opposition ===
Al-Baladhuri reports that the Banu Hashim and some companions gathered at Ali's house after learning about the appointment of Abu Bakr. Among them were Muhammad's uncle Abbas and Zubayr. These protesters held that Ali was the rightful successor to Muhammad, possibly referring to Muhammad's announcement at Ghadir Khumm. Miqdad, Salman, Abu Dharr, Talha were also among the companions who supported Ali's cause.

==== Threats against Ali ====
Abu Bakr is said to have tasked Umar with securing Ali's pledge of allegiance. As noted by al-Tabari, the latter then led an armed mob to Ali's residence and threatened to set the house on fire if Ali and his supporters would not pledge their allegiance to Abu Bakr. The scene soon grew violent, but the mob retreated without Ali's pledge after his wife Fatima pleaded with them, as reported in the Sunni al-Imama wa al-siyasa. Alternatively, al-Baladhuri states that Ali capitulated and pledged allegiance to Abu Bakr immediately after Umar's threat. In contrast, the canonical Sahih al-Bukhari and Sahih Muslim relate that Ali pledged to Abu Bakr after Fatima died sometime later.

==== Boycott of Ali ====
Madelung believes that Abu Bakr later placed a boycott on Ali and also on the Banu Hashim to abandon their support for Ali. As a result, prominent men ceased to speak to Ali, as related in a Sunni hadith attributed to Aisha. Those who initially supported Ali gradually turned away and pledged their allegiance to Abu Bakr, adds Jafri. At the same time, Ali turned down proposals to advance his claims by force, possibly for the unity of a nascent Islam.

==== Attack on Ali's house and his pledge ====
While there is considerable uncertainty about the events, Ali most likely did not pledge allegiance to Abu Bakr until his wife Fatima died within six months of her father Muhammad, as reported by some canonical Sunni works. In Shia sources, the death (and miscarriage) of the young Fatima are attributed to an attack on her house to subdue Ali at the order of Abu Bakr. Sunnis categorically reject these allegations. After Fatima's death and in the absence of popular support, Ali is said to have relinquished his claims to the caliphate for the sake of the unity of a nascent Islam, which was facing internal and external threats, according to Mavani. In contrast with Muhammad's lifetime, Ali is believed to have retired from public life during the caliphates of Abu Bakr, Umar, and Uthman, which has been interpreted as a silent censure of the first three caliphs. While he reputedly advised Abu Bakr and Umar on government and religious matters, the mutual distrust and hostility of Ali with the two caliphs is well-documented, but largely downplayed or ignored in Sunni sources. Their differences were epitomized during the proceedings of the electoral council in 644 when Ali refused to be bound by the precedence of the first two caliphs. In contrast, Shias tend to view Ali's pledge of allegiance to Abu Bakr as a (coerced) act of political expediency or taqiya, thus rejecting that Ali ever pledged. The charge that Ali pledged to Abu Bakr under duress appears also in al-Imama wa al-siyasa, sometimes attributed to Ibn Qutaybah (d. 889) but possibly written by another Sunni author in the Abbasid era. These conflicts after Muhammad's death are considered as the roots of the current division among Muslims. Those who accepted Abu Bakr's caliphate were later labeled Sunnis, while the supporters of Ali's right to caliphate went on to form the Shia.

== See also ==
- Succession to Muhammad
- List of Sahabah who did not give bay'ah to Abu Bakr
- Attack on Fatima's house

== Sources ==
- Walker, Adam H. (2014). "ABU BAKR AL-SIDDIQ (C. 573-634)". In Fitzpatrick, Coeli; Walker, Adam Hani (eds.). Muhammad in History, Thought, and Culture: An Encyclopaedia of the Prophet of God. Vol. 1. ABC-CLIO. pp. 1–4. ISBN 9781610691772.
- Gross, Max (2012). "Shi'a Muslims and Security: the Centrality of Iran". In Seiple, Chris; Hoover, Dennis; Otis, Pauletta (eds.). The Routledge handbook of religion and security. Routledge. ISBN 9781136239328.
- Abbas, Hassan (2021). The Prophet's Heir: The life of Ali ibn Abi Talib. Yale University Press. ISBN 9780300252057.
- Cooperson, Michael (2000). Classical Arabic Biography: The Heirs of the Prophets in the Age of al-Ma'mun. Cambridge University Press. ISBN 978-1-139-42669-5.
- Lalani, Arzina R. (2000). Early Shi'i Thought: The Teachings of Imam Muhammad al-Baqir. I. B. Tauris. ISBN 978-1860644344.
- Lecomte, G. (2022). "Al-Saḳīfa". In Bearman, P. (ed.). Encyclopaedia of Islam (Second ed.). Brill Reference Online.
- Badie, Dina (2017). After Saddam: American Foreign Policy and the Destruction of Secularism in the Middle East. Lexington Books. p. 3. ISBN 978-1-4985-3900-5.
- Madelung, Wilferd (1997). The Succession to Muhammad: A Study of the Early Caliphate. Cambridge University Press. ISBN 0-521-64696-0.
- Jafri, S.H.M (1979). Origins and Early Development of Shia Islam. London: Longman.
- Momen, Moojan (1985). An Introduction to Shi'i Islam. Yale University Press. ISBN 9780853982005.
- Soufi, Denise Louise (1997). The Image of Fatima in Classical Muslim Thought (PhD thesis). Princeton University. ProQuest 304390529.
- Khetia, Vinay (2013). Fatima as a Motif of Contention and Suffering in Islamic Sources (Thesis). Concordia University.
- Mavani, Hamid (2013). Religious authority and political thought in Twelver Shi'ism: From Ali to post-Khomeini. Routledge. ISBN 9780415624404.
- Hazleton, Lesley (2009). After the Prophet: The Epic Story of the Shia-Sunni Split in Islam. Knopf Doubleday Publishing Group. ISBN 9780385532099.
- Aslan, Reza (2011). No god but God: The Origins, Evolution, and Future of Islam. Random House. ISBN 9780812982442.
- Fedele, Valentina (2018). "FATIMA (605/15-632 CE)". In de-Gaia, Susan (ed.). Encyclopedia of Women in World Religions. ABC-CLIO. p. 56. ISBN 9781440848506.
- Buehler, Arthur F. (2014). "FATIMA (d. 632)". In Fitzpatrick, Coeli; Walker, Adam Hani (eds.). Muhammad in History, Thought, and Culture: An Encyclopaedia of the Prophet of God. Vol. 1. ABC-CLIO. pp. 182–7. ISBN 9781610691772.
- Hawa, Salam (2017), The Erasure of Arab Political Identity: Colonialism and Violence, Taylor & Francis, ISBN 978-1-317-39006-0
- Shaban, M.A. (1976). Islamic History: Volume 1, AD 600-750 (AH 132): A New Interpretation. Cambridge University Press. ISBN 9780521291316.
- Amir-Moezzi, Mohammad Ali (2022). "Ghadīr Khumm". Encyclopaedia of Islam (Third ed.). Brill Reference Online.
- Qutbuddin, Tahera (2006). "FATIMA (AL-ZAHRA') BINT MUHAMMAD (CA. 12 BEFORE HIJRA-1 1/CA. 610-632)". In Meri, Josef W. (ed.). Medieval Islamic Civilization: An Encyclopedia. Routledge. pp. 248–50. ISBN 978-0415966900.
- Cortese, Delia; Calderini, Simonetta (2006). Women and the Fatimids in the World of Islam (First ed.). Edinburgh University Press. ISBN 978-0748617333.
- Shu'ayb, Fiazuddin (2013). "succession". In Bowering, Gerhard; Crone, Patricia; Kadi, Wadad; Mirza, Mahan; Stewart, Devin J.; Zaman, Muhammad Qasim (eds.). The Princeton Encyclopedia of Islamic Political Thought. Princeton University Press. pp. 524–6. ISBN 9780691134840.
- Afsaruddin, Asma (2013). The First Muslims: History and Memory. Oneworld Publications. ISBN 9781780744483.
- Steigerwald, Diana (2004). Martin, Richard C. (ed.). Encyclopedia of Islam and the Muslim World. Vol. First. Macmillan Reference USA. pp. 35–8. ISBN 9780028656045.
- Veccia Vaglieri, L. (2022). "ʿAlī B. Abī Ṭālib". In Bearman, P. (ed.). Encyclopaedia of Islam (Second ed.). Brill Reference Online.
- Anthony, Sean W. (2013). "'Ali b. Abi Talib (ca. 599-661)". In Bowering, Gerhard (ed.). The Princeton encyclopedia of Islamic political thought. Princeton University Press. pp. 30–2. ISBN 9780691134840.
- Madelung, W. (2022). "S̲h̲īʿa". In Bearman, P. (ed.). Encyclopaedia of Islam (Second ed.). Brill Reference Online.
- Lucas, Scott C. (2004). Constructive Critics, Ḥadīth Literature, and the Articulation of Sunnī Islam: The Legacy of the Generation of Ibn Saʻd, Ibn Maʻīn, and Ibn Ḥanbal. Brill. ISBN 9789004133198.
- Arnold, Thomas W. (2016). The Caliphate. Taylor and Francis. ISBN 9781315443225.
- Keaney, Heather N. (2021). 'Uthman ibn 'Affan: Legend or Liability?. Oneworld Publications. ISBN 9781786076984.
- McHugo, John (2018). A Concise History of Sunnis and Shi'is. Georgetown University Press. ISBN 9781626165885.
- Lalani, Arzina R. (2006). "Shi'a". In Leaman, Oliver (ed.). The Qurʼan: an encyclopedia. Routledge. pp. 586–93. ISBN 9-78-0-415-32639-1.
- Shah-Kazemi, Reza (2022). Imam 'Ali: Concise History, Timeless Mystery. I.B. Tauris. ISBN 9781784539368.
- Lewis, Bernard (1968). The Arabs in History. Hutchinson & Co.
- Poonawala, I.K. (1982). "ʿALĪ B. ABĪ ṬĀLEB I. Life". Encyclopaedia Iranica, Online Edition.
- Nasr, Seyyed Hossein; Afsaruddin, Asma (2021). "ʿAlī". Encyclopedia Britannica.
- Ayoub, Mahmoud M. (2014). The Crisis of Muslim History: Religion and Politics in Early Islam. Oneworld Publications. ISBN 9781780746746.
- Dakake, Maria Massi (2008). The Charismatic Community: Shi'ite Identity in Early Islam. SUNY Press. ISBN 978-0-7914-7033-6.
- Daftary, Farhad (2014). A History of Shi'i Islam. Bloomsbury Academic. ISBN 9781780768410.
- Tabatabai, S.M.H. (1975). Shi'ite Islam. Translated by Nasr, S.H. State University of New York Press. ISBN 0873953908.
