= Abdul Rahman Al-Ghamdi =

Muslim Jihadist

- Born: 1974
- Died: June 2, 2004 (aged 29–30); Al Huda
- Known for: suspected jihadist

Abdul Rahman Al-Ghamdi (Arabic: عبد الرحمن الغامدي; 1974 – 2 June 2004) is a citizen of Saudi Arabia who is believed to have been a jihadist.

In 2003, Al-Ghamdi married Umm Hajir Al-Azdi, the sister of a Guantanamo captive, whose first husband said she was also a ‘takfeeri’. His wife's first husband told the Saudi Gazette that Al-Ghamdi "...had been killed in a confrontation with security forces in Al-Huda on the Taif to Makkah road."

In July 2003, BBC News reported that a Saudi named "Ali Abdu Rahman Al Ghamdi" was number two on a Saudi most wanted list, and that he had peacefully surrendered in 2003. USA Today reported his name was "Ali Abd al-Rahman al-Faqasi al-Ghamdi" and that he had fought against US forces in Afghanistan.

In September 2003, the Arab News reported that a Saudi named "Bandar ibn Abdul Rahman Al-Ghamdi" was on a list of nineteen most wanted suspects, and that he had recently been extradited from Yemen with seven other Saudi suspects.
