= Muhammad bin Nasser Al-Aboudi =

Saudi writer (1926–2022)

- محمد ناصر العبودي
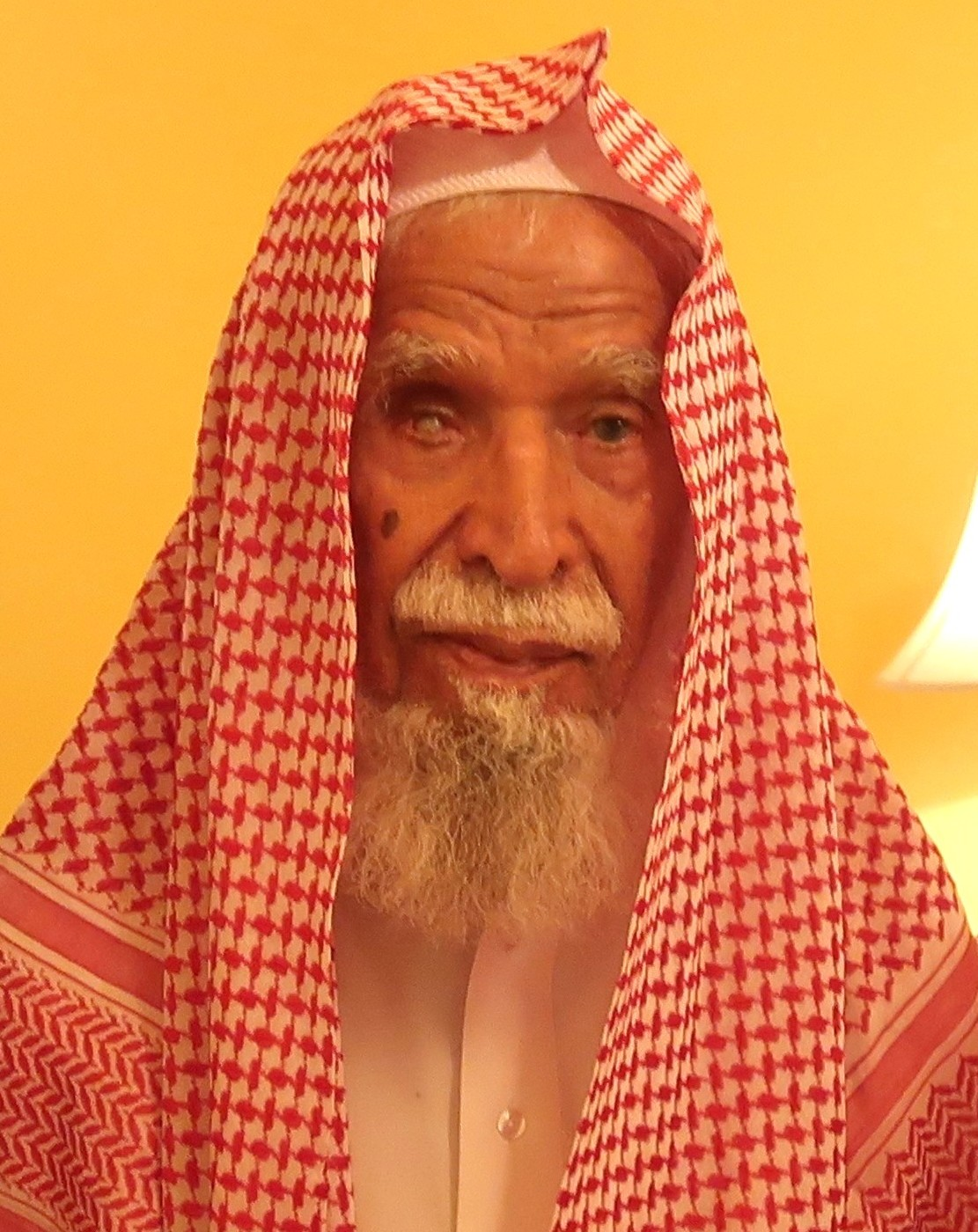
- Muhammad bin Nasser Al-Aboudi
- Born: 1345 AH / 1926 AD; Buraidah, Saudi Arabia
- Died: 2 Dhu al-Hijjah 1443 AH / 1 July 2022 AD
- Education: Islamic Law
- Occupations: Writer, Author, Traveler
- Notable work: Over 160 books on travel literature, 125 books on trips, 15 books on advocacy, and 15 books on literature and language Full list
- Awards: Medal of Merit in Literature (1394 AH / 1974 AD)

Muhammad bin Nasser Al-Aboudi, (Arabic: محمد ناصر العبودي; 1345 AH / 1926 AD - died 2 Dhu al-Hijjah 1443 AH / 1 July 2022 AD) was a Saudi writer, author and traveller.

== Biography ==
He was born in the city of Buraydah, and received his initial education there. Then he worked as a teacher and then director of the Scientific Institute in Buraidah. He also served as the Director and Secretary General of the Islamic University of Madinah for thirteen years. He held the position of Assistant Secretary-General of the Muslim World League. His work in the League and before that at the Islamic University in Medina as its Secretary-General allowed him to visit most parts of the world. His numerous observations and insights resulted in more than one hundred and sixty books on travel literature, thus achieving a record number in Arab travel books. He was awarded the Medal of Merit in Literature in the year 1394 AH, 1974 AD.

Muhammad bin Nasser bin Abdul Rahman bin Abdul Karim bin Abdullah bin Aboud bin Muhammad bin Salem Al Salem was born in 1345 AH on the last day of Rabi` al-Thani of Jumada al-Ula. He was educated in the city of Buraidah in one of the schools, then in the government school, then at the hands of many sheikhs, and from whom his first sheikh benefited, Sheikh Abdullah bin Muhammad bin Humaid, and Sheikh Omar bin Muhammad bin Salim and Sheikh Saleh bin Ahmed Al-Khuraisi, Sheikh Saleh bin Abdul Rahman Al-Sakiti, and many others.

== Writings ==
Although al-Aboudi's education was a religious education in the field of Islamic law, most of his books were literary, and the bulk of them are in the field of travel literature, as he is considered one of the pioneers in this field in the Kingdom of Saudi Arabia, and the other part of his works are in the field of the Arabic language. The number of his printed books has reached approximately 128 books, and he has about 100 books. Another is still in manuscript awaiting printing, and he has 125 books on trips, 15 books on advocacy, and 15 books on literature and language.

=== In travel literature ===
- To the south of the north: the country of Sweden
- Patani or southern Thailand
- Rajasthan: The Land of Kings (from the Indian Journeys series)
- Lines from the perspective and the aphorisms about the country of Takrur, a journey in Mali and a talk about its glorious past and its new present
- The modern Kyrgyzstan study in its past and field observations
- Official visit to Taiwan
- In Western India (from the Indian Journeys series)
- Days in Vietnam
- Guyana and Suriname
- In South India (from the Indian Journeys series)
- Muslims in Laos and Cambodia: A Journey and Field Views
- Tourism in Kashmir
- From Angola to Cape Verde
- Russian flight
- Between Uruguay and Paraguay
- I was in Albania
- In southern China
- Niger days
- I was in Bulgaria
- Memories of Yugoslavia
- Article in Bengal
- In the countries of the forgotten Muslims: Bukhara and Beyond the River
- Republic of Azerbaijan
- The country of Dagestan
- With Polish Muslims
- A tour of the islands of the Negro Sea or a talk about Islam and Muslims in the islands of the Indian Ocean Trips to Mauritius, Reunion, Comoros, Zanzibar and Seychelles
- Burma News and Eyes
- Madagascar The Land of the Lost Muslims.
- A tour of the islands of the Negro Sea.
- In Nepal the country of mountains.
- Trip to the Maldives.
- Trip to Ceylon.
- Link to talk about African.
- Views in the country of racists.
- A visit to the Islamic Sultanate of Brunei.
- Tours in Central America.

A view of the southern end of the world.

- To the far south of America.
- Memories in Africa.
- A tour of the islands of Caribbean.
- On the peaks of the Andes.
- A tour of the islands of the South Pacific.
- On the banks of Amazon.
- View of Australia.
- To the countries of the Middle East.
- In the depths of China popular.
- To Eritrea after thirty-six years.

=== In other fields ===
- News of Abu Al-Aina Al-Yamami.
- Colloquial Proverbs in Najd, 5 vols.
- The Book of Weights.
- Puffs of tranquility Quranic.
- Popular aphorisms.
- Swaneh Literary.
- Heavy pictures.
- The Islamic world and the League.
- Scenes from Buraydah.
- Mullah bin Saif News.
- Mutawa Al-Lusaib News.
- This is what I got from people.
- Efforts of King Fahd, may God have mercy on him, to serve Islam and Muslims.
- Martinique and Barbados.
- Relations between Kingdom of Saudi Arabia and Turkey.
- Puerto Rico and the Dominican Republic.
- Volunteered in Paris.
- Borrowers.
- Modi and her daughters.
- Maqamat desert.

=== Genealogy ===
The Dictionary of Osr Al-Qassim, which is a large travel book that includes a group of books, including:

- Dictionary of the families of Buraidah in twenty-three volumes.
- Unaizah Families Dictionary.
- Dictionary of families north of Qassim.
- Dictionary of families south of Qassim.
- Dictionary of families east of Al-Qassim.
- Dictionary of families west of Qassim.

=== In Arabic ===
- Book of ruled words.
- The book of extraneous words in our vernacular language.
- A Dictionary of Eloquent Origins of Common Words (which is in 13 volumes).
- Dictionary of religion and religiosity in the language of the public.
- Dictionary of hunting and hunting for the general public.

He also has other books, In addition to this, Al-Aboudi's interest in slang words and popular proverbs, and an attempt to link them to the classical Arabic language by returning the words to their origins through comparison, and his writings in this aspect:

- Colloquial Proverbs in Najd (5 volumes from the publications of Dar Al Yamamah and Darat King Abdulaziz)
- Words That Died (Two Volumes, King Abdulaziz House)
- Dictionary of Extraneous Words (two volumes, King Abdulaziz Public Library)
- A Dictionary of Eloquent Origins of Common Words (13 volumes, King Abdul Aziz Public Library).
- The Palm Dictionary in the Folk Tradition

== Awards and honors ==
Al-Aboudi was honored from several quarters in appreciation of his scientific and literary efforts. He was awarded a number of certificates. Among the bodies that honored him:

- The Ministry of Education in 1394 AH honored him with the Medal of Merit in Literature.
- The binary of Abd al-Maqsoud Khoja in 1406 AH.
- Literary Club Qassim in 1421 AH.
- Trinity Mushawh.
- Won the Prince Salman bin Abdulaziz Prize for Studies on the History of the Arabian Peninsula in its third session 1429-1430 AH (2008-2009 AD), where he “was awarded the Pioneers Appreciation Award for his scientific efforts represented in his careful monitoring of the efforts of the Kingdom of Saudi Arabia.” Saudi Arabia in the field of Islamic advocacy, and the delivery of generous aid to Islamic peoples, and his meticulous recording through his more than 100 books about his travels in the Islamic world, and the bibliographic description mixed with historical monitoring of many places in the Kingdom of Saudi Arabia, especially in his dictionary for the Qassim region, which he created in six volumes, His interest in folk traditions and colloquial proverbs in some regions of the Kingdom of Saudi Arabia, and his recording of this in many of his books, and his interest in the history of some popular personalities and the recording of their news.

His book (Dictionary of Eloquent Origins of Common Words) won the Book of the Year Award presented by the Riyadh Literary and Cultural Club in its third session 1431 AH (2010 AD). His book (The Dictionary of Clothes in the Popular Tradition) won the Ministry of Culture and Information's Book Award for this year 1435 AH (2014 AD). His book (Dictionary of the Face of the Earth and Related to Mountains, Wells, Air etc. in Folk Traditions) won the King Abdul Aziz Book Award in its second session 1436 AH (2015 AD) in the branch of the Prize for Books Related to the Geography of the Kingdom of Saudi Arabia. He was honored in the year 7 Ramadan 1442 AH corresponding to April 19, 2021, AD with the Cultural Personality of the Year award in the National Cultural Awards Initiative from the Ministry of Culture in the Kingdom of Saudi Arabia.

== Death ==
Al-Aboudi died on Friday, 2 Dhu al-Hijjah 1443 AH, corresponding to July 1, 2022, AD, and it was announced that he would be prayed for after the noon prayer on Saturday at Al-Jawhara Mosque Al-Babtain in the city of Riyadh.
