= Banu Aslam =

Banu Aslam (Arabic: بنو أسلم) were an Arabian tribe during the Islamic prophet Muhammad's era. During the Invasion of Hamra al-Asad, Muhammad sent 3 spies belonging to this tribe to track the departing Meccan Army.

During the Battle of the Trench also known as the Battle of Khandaq, the Banu Aslam made up one tribe consisting of a confederation of tribes which took part in the battle.

During the Saqifa, the Banu Aslam came in large numbers to support Abu Bakr and Umar and pledge their allegiance to Abu Bakr around the time of the Ridda Wars, Abu Bakr noted that after seeing this he was certain of victory in the succession struggle.

== See also ==
- List of battles of Muhammad
