= Saeed bin Naser Alghamdi =

Saudi academic

- سعيد بن ناصر الغامدي
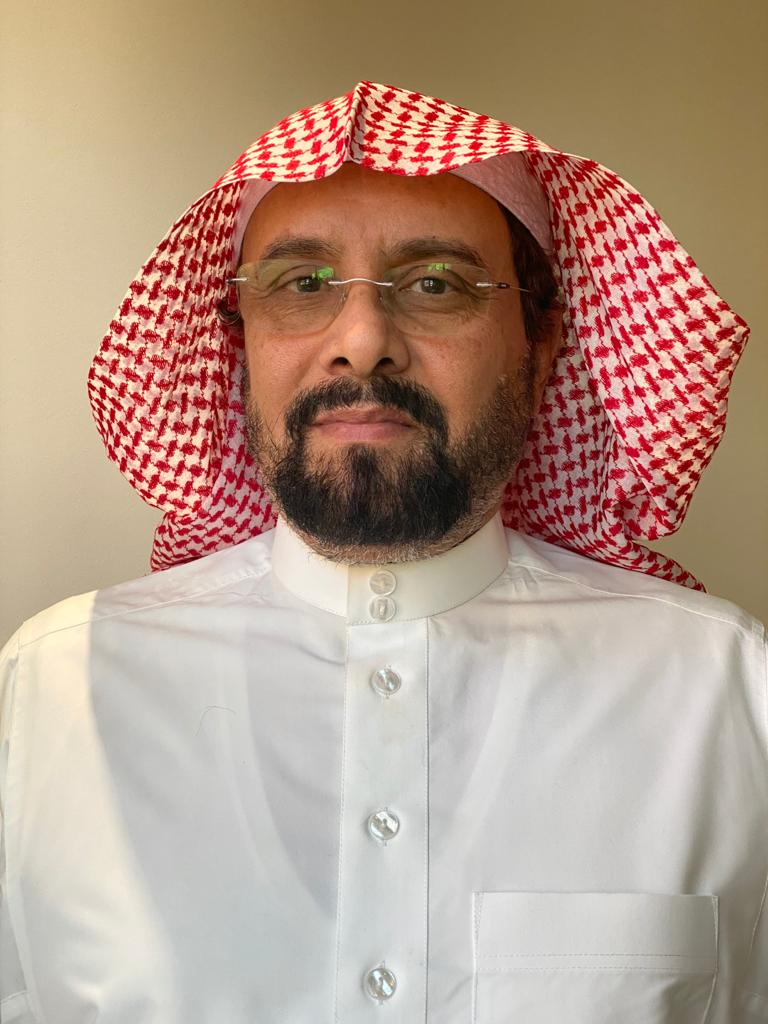
- Born: December 28, 1961 (age 64); Saudi Arabia
- Occupations: Lecturer and researcher

Saeed bin Naser Alghamdi (Arabic: سعيد بن ناصر الغامدي; born 28 December 1961) is a Saudi academic, political activist, and researcher of contemporary religious doctrines. He was born in the Kingdom of Saudi Arabia and is known for his publications on various Islamic topics.

== Early life and education ==
Alghamdi was born on 28 December 1961 in Saudi Arabia. In 1982, he completed his bachelor's degree from the College of Sharia and Fundamentals of Religion. Then in 1990, he earned a master's degree in Islamic creed and contemporary religious doctrine from the Imam Mohammad Ibn Saud Islamic University (IMSIU). Later, in 1999 he obtained his Ph.D. from King Khalid University in Islamic creed and contemporary religious doctrine.

== Career ==
Alghamdi started his career in 1999 as an assistant teacher in the Islamic Creed and Contemporary Religious Doctrine Department at King Khalid University.

He wrote publications and books in several fields, including terminology, culture shock, heresy, characteristics of Allah, prophecies, ideology, faith, and preachers.

Many of his articles were recognized in Muhajat's corner. He also wrote for the Al-Risala newspaper, publishing in the Awassim corner.

Recently, he worked as a lecturer at King Abdulaziz University in Jeddah, Saudi Arabia.

As of 2022, Alghamdi is working as a chairman of the Board of Trustees at Sanad Human Rights Foundation and Supervisor of the Scientific Research Unit. In addition, he is serving as the General Secretary of Muntada Al-Ulama.

== Research and writing ==
In 1996, he delivered research in a scientific seminar on The Rules of Sharia and New Terminology. Later in 1999, Alghamdi worked on a project called The Origins of Contemporary Thought (Modernity) and delivered its summary at a literary club in Abha.

In 2000, Alghamdi collaborated on a project, How to Administer Dialogue Between Civilizations, presented by King Khalid University. In the same year, he performed research on the project What We Should and Shouldn't Take from Contemporary Sciences, which was delivered in a lecture at the university.

In 2016, he wrote for Al-Madina and Al-Risala newspapers.

== Publications ==
His publications include:

- Questions of Terminology
- Restrictions when dealing with dissentious prophecies
- Introduction to civilization and cultural shocks
- The reality and rules of Heresy
- Proving the characteristics of Allah; His face and hands
- Baath party, its history, and ideology
- How preachers cheat
- How attitudes to modernity deviate from faith
- The Congregation
