= Nasser bin Abdulaziz Al Saud =

Saudi royal, businessman and government official (1911–1984)

Governor of Riyadh Province
- In office: 1938–1951
- Predecessor: Muhammad bin Saad bin Zaid
- Successor: Sultan bin Abdulaziz
- Monarch: Abdulaziz
- Born: 1911; Riyadh, Emirate of Nejd and Hasa
- Died: 15 September 1984 (aged 72–73); Saudi Arabia
- Spouse: Muhdi bint Ahmed Al Sudairi
Names
- Nasser bin Abdulaziz bin Abdul Rahman Al Saud
- House: Al Saud
- Father: King Abdulaziz
- Mother: Bazza I

Nasser bin Abdulaziz Al Saud (Arabic: ناصر بن عبد العزيز آل سعود; 1911 – 15 September 1984) was a Saudi Arabian businessman who served as the governor of Riyadh Province from 1938 to 1951. He was a member of the House of Saud.

== Biography ==
Prince Nasser was born in Qasr Al Hukm, Riyadh, in 1911. There are other reports, giving his birth date as 1913 and as 1921. He was the sixth son of King Abdulaziz. His mother was Bazza, a Moroccan woman. Prince Nasser had no full-brothers or full-sisters. He received education in Riyadh at the school of the palace, learning Quran, horsemanship and war techniques.

In 1938, King Abdulaziz appointed him as the governor of Riyadh Province. However, he had to resign from his post due to an incident in which several foreigners died of alcohol poisoning. Upon hearing of this event, King Abdulaziz threw him in jail. He was replaced by his half-brother Sultan bin Abdulaziz in the post. Subsequently, Nasser bin Abdulaziz lost his post and never returned to public life.

Prince Nasser and his half-brother Prince Saad were excluded from the succession, and their younger half-brother Fahd was selected as crown prince instead in 1975. However, the supersession did not cause turmoil because both Nasser and Saad were regarded as weak contenders due to being relatively less experienced. Furthermore, Prince Nasser lost his chance to become king due to "dissolute" mores. He was regarded as unsuitable for succession by the larger family. His lack of accomplishment and low birth (his mother was a woman of colour from Morocco) were also factors leading to his exclusion. Prince Nasser was one of two sons of King Abdulaziz who did not support the Crown Prince Faisal in his struggle with King Saud.

One of his wives, Muhdi bint Ahmed bin Mohammed Al Sudairi, was the younger sister of his step-mother, Hussa, who was the mother of seven influential sons, known as the Sudairi Seven. Nasser and Muhdi had five sons: Prince Khalid, Prince Abdullah, Prince Fahd, Prince Turki and Prince Ahmed. His other spouse was a daughter of Abdullah bin Mutaib Al Rashid. Another one was a great granddaughter of Nuri Al Shalaan. One of Nasser's sons, Turki, was a former military officer and the former head of the Presidency of Meteorology and Environment (PME). Another son, Mohammed bin Nasser, is the governor of Jizan Province. Mansour bin Nasser was one of King Abdullah's advisors. Yet another son, Abdulaziz bin Nasser, is a businessman and the father of Saud bin Abdulaziz, who murdered his servant in London in 2010. Abdullah bin Nasser, another son of Prince Nasser, was the president of Saudi football club Al Hilal in the 1970s. Prince Nasser's daughter, Al Bandara, died in Riyadh in February 2017.

Prince Nasser could not walk and used a wheelchair in his last years. He died on 15 September 1984 and was buried in Riyadh. His family founded the Prince Nasser bin Abdulaziz Center for Autism, an affiliated body of the Saudi Autism Center; the center was opened in April 2012.

== Ancestry ==
Ancestors of Nasser bin Abdulaziz Al Saud

16. Turki bin Abdullah bin Muhammad
8. Faisal bin Turki bin Abdullah Al Saud
17. Hia bint Hamad bin Ali Al Faqih Angari Tamimi
4. Abdul Rahman bin Faisal
18. Mishari bin Abdulrahman bin Hassan Al Saud
9. Sarah bint Mishari bin Abdulrahman bin Hassan Al Saud
2. Abdulaziz bin Abdul Rahman
20. Mohammed bin Turki bin Suleiman Al Sudairi
10. Ahmed Al Kabir bin Mohammed bin Turki Al Sudairi
5. Sara bint Ahmed Al Sudairi
1. Nasser bin Abdulaziz Al Saud
3. Bazza I
