= Abdullah bin Faisal Al Saud (1831–1889) =

Emir of Nejd (1831–1889)

Emir of Nejd
- Reign: 1876–1889
- Predecessor: Abdul Rahman bin Faisal
- Successor: Abdul Rahman bin Faisal
- Reign: 1871–1873
- Predecessor: Saud bin Faisal
- Successor: Saud bin Faisal
- Reign: 1865–1871
- Predecessor: Faisal bin Turki
- Successor: Saud bin Faisal
- Born: 1831
- Died: 2 December 1889 (aged 57–58); Riyadh
- Spouse: Turayfa bint Ubayd Al Rashid; Noura bint Abdullah Al Rashid
Names
- Abdullah bin Faisal bin Turki bin Abdullah
- House: Al Saud
- Father: Faisal bin Turki Al Saud

Abdullah bin Faisal Al Saud (Arabic: عبد الله بن فيصل آل سعود ʿAbd Allāh bin Fayṣal Āl Suʿūd; 1831 – 2 December 1889) was one of the rulers of the Emirate of Najd, also known as Second Saudi State. His reign witnessed extensive struggle among the members of the Al Saud family which led to turmoil in the region.

== Early life ==
Abdullah was born in 1831. He was the eldest son of Faisal bin Turki bin Abdullah, who ruled the Emirate of Najd for 26 years. He had three brothers: Saud, Mohammad and Abdul Rahman. Of them Saud and Abdul Rahman were his half-brothers. The mother of Abdullah and Mohammad was from the Al Saud.

In December 1838 his father was surrendered by Egyptian commander Khurshid Pasha and sent to Egypt. Abdullah and his brother Mohammad accompanied their father together with their uncle Jiluwi bin Turki. Following his return to Nejd, Faisal bin Turki managed to reestablish his rule, and during his reign there occurred a rivalry between his sons Abdullah and Saud.

The personality of Abdullah and Saud was very different in that the latter was relatively liberal, but the former was a strict religious man. Another difference between them is that Abdullah was a skilled military leader, but an autocratic administrator, whereas Saud was energetic and extrovert.

== Heir apparent ==
In June 1865 Abdullah was made heir apparent by his father, Faisal bin Turki. He enjoyed great power during this period and acted as the de facto ruler of the Emirate. Abdullah's forces defeated rebellious governor of Buraida, Abdulaziz Al Ulaiyan, who joined riots in the province of Unaiza in 1848-1849 which is called the battle of Yalima. Abdullah was also instrumental in signing an agreement with Mohammad Al Khalifa, ruler of Bahrain, to continue his annual payments to the Emirate of Najd. Another significant victory of Abdullah was against Rakan bin Hithlain who was the leader of the Ajman tribe. They rebelled against Faisal bin Turki in 1854 and again challenged his rule in 1860, but Faisal sent a large force against the Ajman tribe led by Abdullah who defeated them. Next year the Ajman tribe reattempted to end the rule of Faisal which led to their total destruction.

William Palgrave, an English priest and traveller, met with heir apparent Abdullah while visiting the region. Palgrave described him as a proud, cruel and fearless politician. Abdullah asked Palgrave to get him strychnine. Palgrave believed that Abdullah wanted it to poison his old father to start his reign before his brother, Saud, would get more power. Palgrave did not accept his offer, and then he was accused by Abdullah of espionage and was almost executed for his Christian beliefs.

== Reign ==
Faisal died in December 1865, and Abdullah succeeded him. Following his accession to the throne, Abdullah attempted to centralize the power. He was backed by his uncle, Abdullah bin Turki, whose descendants are known as Al Turki branch, and the Wahhabi leaders. Sheikh Abdul Rahman (1779–1868) who was the grandson of Sheikh Mohammad ibn Abdul Wahhab and the son of Hasan bin Mohammad publicly announced that people should support Abdullah due to the fact that his succession had been previously established by Imam Faisal bin Turki.

In the first year of his reign Abdullah signed a treaty with the British authorities to get financial assistance and protection. The same year he started the construction of Masmak Fort in Riyadh. In 1867 the Ottomans send him a certificate of governance to strengthen his position as a ruler and to support him against the competitors.

Although his succession was not problematic and his brother Saud also declared his allegiance to Abdullah, Saud attacked Abdullah's rule in 1866-67. They fought in the battle of Al Mutala, and Saud was defeated and escaped to Trucial Oman. The Ajman tribe supported Saud in his struggle against Abdullah. Abdullah's supporters were the tribes of Subai' and Al Suhul from the Al 'Aridh and the Qahtan of Najd during his struggle with Saud. Abdullah's another brother, Mohammad, also challenged his rule.

Therefore, Abdullah demanded the assistance of the Ottoman forces to defeat Saud and others for which he granted a fatwa from a Wahhabi scholar, Mohammad bin Ibrahim bin Ajlan, although more conservative ones declined his demand. The Ottoman official who Abdullah appealed was Midhat Pasha, governor of Iraq. Abdullah's request was accepted by Midhat Pasha, but the Ottoman forces gained Al Hasa in 1871 which remained under the rule of the Ottoman state until 1913 when Abdullah's nephew, Ibn Saud or Abdulaziz bin Abdul Rahman, took over the region. Following his cooperation with Midhat Pasha Abdullah was made qaimmaqam of Nejd in 1871.

Saud won his struggle against Abdullah in the battle of Juda in December 1871, but at the same time a civil war broke out which lasted for more than a decade. Abdullah escaped to Al Qasim to take assistance from the Al Rashids. Instead, he was able to get assistance from the Qahtan tribe. Following a brief rule of Saud Abdullah regained the throne, and Sheikh Abdul Latif, great-grandson of Mohammad bin Abdul Wahab, announced his support to Abdullah. The alliance between Abdullah and Ottomans ended in 1872 due to the former's reluctance to continue the cooperation. In fact, Abdullah was regretful of his decision about formation of an alliance with the Ottomans.

Abdullah's second term lasted one more year ending in 1873 when Saud again became the ruler. This time the youngest brother, Abdul Rahman, ended the reign of Saud in 1875, but Abdul Rahman's rule was very brief. Abdullah regained the power the same year when his rival brother Saud died. However, Abdullah's reign also lasted very short.

In 1887 Abdullah bin Faisal was imprisoned by Mohammad bin Saud, son of Saud bin Faisal. Mohammad bin Abdullah Al Rashid, Emir of Jabal Shammar, freed Abdullah as well as his younger brother Abdul Rahman who were both taken to Hail. Eventually Al Rashids forced the members of the Al Saud family to leave Riyadh when they were defeated by Mohammad bin Abdullah Al Rashid in the battle of Mulayda in 1891.

=== Reasons for his failure to consolidate power ===
Years later King Abdulaziz stated three major reasons for the failure of his uncle, Abdullah bin Faisal, as follows: (1) negative propaganda of Abdullah's nephews in Al Kharj; (2) Abdullah's support for the Al ‘Ulayyan, the former rulers of Al Qassim, against the Al Muhanna, the rulers of the region and (3) the attempts of Mohammad Al Rashid to capture Najd. Another factor cited by R. Bayly Winder, an expert on the history of Arabia, is that Abdullah tended to appoint non-local administrators to the regions and to his government and made them very powerful. Such practices which caused irritation among the local people had not been followed by the previous Saudi rulers.

In addition to these factors Abdullah bin Faisal did not have any male offsprings who could support him against the contenders such as his half-brother Saud who had six sons. Therefore, Abdullah could not manage to have a large number of supporters in the family.

== Personal life and death ==
One of Abdullah bin Faisal's spouses, Turayfa bint Ubayd, was from the Rashidi dynasty who was the niece of Abdullah bin Ali Al Rashid, emir of Jabal Shammar. Abdullah also married another woman from the Rashidi dynasty: Noura, the daughter of Abdullah bin Ali Al Rashid. The marriage took place soon after the beginning of Imam Faisal's second term. Noura's father and brother, Talal bin Abdullah, joined the wedding ceremony in Riyadh.

Abdullah had several daughters and had only one son who died young. His daughter, Noura bint Abdullah, married Talal bin Abdullah. Another, Sara, was one of King Abdulaziz's spouses, and they did not have any child. Abdullah's another daughter wed Sheikh Abdul Latif Al Sheikh.

Abdullah died in Riyadh on 2 December 1889 shortly after he was brought there by his younger brother, Abdul Rahman, from Hail. Following the exile of his family in 1891 the palace of Abdullah in Riyadh was used by the Al Rashid governor, Ajlan.
