= Shammar =

Arabian tribal confederation

- Qahtanite, Tayyi
- The supposed flag of Jabal Shammar, in contemporary use by members of the Shammar tribe.
- Ethnicity: Arab
- Nisba: al-Shammari
- Location: Mainly: Saudi Arabia and Iraq; Also: Syria, Jordan, Kuwait
- Parent tribe: Tayy
- Branches: Abdah; Aslam; Sinjarah
- Language: Arabic
- Religion: Islam

The tribe of Shammar (Arabic: شَمَّر, romanized: Šammar) is an Arab tribe, descended from the ancient tribe of Tayy originating in Yemen. It is the largest branch of the Tayy, and one of the largest and most influential Arab tribes. The historical and traditional seat of the tribe's leadership is in the city of Ḥaʼil; where most of the people of the tribe of Shammar are found, in what was the Emirate of Jabal Shammar in what is now Saudi Arabia. At their peak of power in the 1850s, the Shammar ruled much of central and northern Arabia from Riyadh to the frontiers of Syria and the vast area of Upper Mesopotamia (Arabic: الجزيرة, romanized: al-Jazīra, lit. 'the region').

The tribe mainly resides in both Iraq and Saudi Arabia (mainly in the north, around Ha'il). The tribe also exists in neighbouring Arab countries such as Syria, Jordan, Kuwait, and the UAE.

One of the early famous figures from the tribe was the legendary Hatim Al-Ta'i (Hatim of Tayy; died 578), a Christian Arab renowned for generosity and hospitality who figured in the One Thousand and One Nights. The early Islamic historical sources report that his son, Adi ibn Hatim, whom they sometimes refer to as the "king" of Tayy, converted to Islam before Muhammad's death. Another figure from Tayy during this period was Zayd al-Khayr, a prominent member of Tayy who is said to have led Tayy's delegation to Muhammad accepting Islam.

== Origins ==
The Shammar are a tribal confederation made up of three main branches: Abdah, Al-Aslam, and Sinjarah. The earliest non-Arab sources refer to Arabs as Taits, thought of as referring to the Tayy, as Iyas ibn Qabisah al-Ta'i, a governor of al-Hirah in Lower Mesopotamia in the Lakhmid kingdom, had contact with both the Byzantine and Sasanian Empires. Since some sections of Tayy, and most of the Ghassanids and Lakhmids, were present in Mesopotamia and the Levant prior to Muhammad's preaching of Islam in the early 7th century. In the Namara inscription (the second oldest pre-Islamic Arabic inscription, dating from 328 CE), the name "Shammar" is believed to refer to a city in Yemen, though it may refer to the city where the Himyarite King Shammar Yahri'sh lived, Radda District (located about 100 kilometres (62 mi) from Dhamar, an ancient historic site). Since King Shammar Yahri'sh ruled during the last decade of the third century, it could be referring to the city he lived in or one named after him. It could also be referring to the city of Ha'il, although there is no evidence that Imru Al-Qays fought the Tayy.

Led by Usma bin Luai, the Tayy invaded the mountains of Ajā and Salma from Banu Assad and Banu Tamim in northern Arabia in their exodus from Yemen in 115 CE. These mountains are now known as the Shammar. The Tayy became nomadic camel-herders and horse-breeders in northern Najd for centuries. Because of their strength and blood relations with the Yemenite dynasties that came to rule Syria (The Ghassanids) and Iraq (The Lakhmids), the Tayy expanded north into Iraq all the way to the capital at the time, Al-Hirah. The area of the two mountains subsequently came to be known as "Jabal Shammar" ("Shammar's Mountain") from the 14th century, the first time that the Shammar as a tribe were noted in literature.

== History ==
Led by Usma bin Luai, the Tayy invaded the mountains of Ajaa and Salma from Banu Assad and Banu Tamim in northern Arabia in their exodus from Yemen in 115 CE. These mountains were renamed to Jabal Tayy (Tayy's Mountain), and then again in the 14th century, after the tribe changed their name, to Jabal Shammar. There, Tayy, later Shammar, became either city-dwellers in the city of Ha'il, nomadic pastoralists, camel-herders and horse-breeders in northern Najd, or agriculturists in the countryside outside Ha'il or in the surrounding desert oases. These divisions were based on profession, personal interest and skill, and not family or blood-line stratifications within the tribe. It is common for the same nuclear family to have members living each of the three different lifestyles. Because of their strength and blood relations with the Yemenite dynasties that came to rule Syria (Ghassanids) and Iraq (Muntherids), the Tayy expanded north into Iraq all the way to al-Hira, the capital at the time. Oral tradition mentions that the first chiefs of the Shammar tribe, Arar and Omair, were of the 'Abda family of Dhaigham, who ruled Shammar from Jabal Shammar. In the 17th century, a large section of the Shammar left Jabal Shammar under the leadership of the Al Jarba and settled in Iraq, reaching as far as the northern city of Mosul, their current stronghold. The Shammar are currently one of Iraq's largest tribes and are divided into two geographical, as opposed to genealogical, subsections. The northern branch, known as Shammar al-Jarba, is mainly Sunni, while the southern branch, Shammar Toga, converted to Shia Islam around the 19th century after settling in southern Iraq.

The Shammar that remained in Arabia had tribal territories extending from the city of Ha'il northwards to the frontiers of the Syrian Desert. The Shammar had a long traditional rivalry with the confederation of 'Anizzah, who inhabited the same area. The city of Ha'il became the heart of the Jabal Shammar region and was inhabited largely by settled members of Shammar and their clients. Two clans succeeded each other in ruling the city in the 19th century. The first clan, the Al Ali, were replaced by the Al Rashid.

During the civil war that tore apart the Second Saudi State in the late 19th century, the emirs of Ha'il, from the house of Al Rashid, intervened and gradually took control of much of the Saudi realm, finally taking the Saudi capital Riyadh in 1895 and expelling the Saudi leaders to Kuwait. The Bedouin Shammari tribesmen provided the majority of the Al Rashid's military support. Later, in the first two decades of the 20th century, Al Rashid were defeated by Ibn Saud and his Wahhabi forces when his campaign to restore his family's rule in the Arabian Peninsula culminated in the Conquest of Ha'il in 1921. Following Al Rashid's defeat many Shammar fled to Syria and Iraq. Eventually the clan of their uncles, Al Sabhan pledged allegiance to Ibn Saud in Riyadh. Ibn Saud also married a daughter of one of the Shammari chiefs, who bore him one Saudi King, Abdullah. After the establishment of modern borders, most Bedouins gradually left their nomadic lifestyle. Today, most members of the Shammar live modern, urbanized lifestyles in Saudi Arabia and Iraq, and some sections settled in Syria and Jordan. Despite this, the vast majority of Shammar continue to retain a strong tribal identity and loyalty to their tribe. Many also participate in Cultural Festivals to learn about their ancient lifestyles, and to take part in traditional activities such as folk dancing.

== House of Rashid ==
The House of Rashid (Rasheed) were a historic Shammar dynasty on the Arabian Peninsula. They were the most formidable enemies of the House of Saud in Nejd. They were centered in Ha'il, a city in northern Nejd that derived its wealth from being on the route of the Hajj. The Al Rashid derived their name from the grandfather of Abdullah, the first Rashidi amir of Ha'il, who was named Ibn Rashid. The Rashidi emirs cooperated closely with the Ottoman Empire. However, this cooperation became problematic as the Ottomans lost popularity. As with many Arab dynasties, the lack of a generally accepted rule of succession was a recurrent problem with Rashidi rule. The internal dispute normally centered on whether succession should be horizontal (i.e. to a brother) or vertical (to a son). These divisions within the family led to bloody infighting. In the last years of the nineteenth century six Rashidi leaders died violently. Nevertheless, The Al Rashid family continued to rule and fight together against Ibn Saud.

Saudi Arabia- The first twenty years of the 20th century on the Arabian Peninsula featured a long-running series of wars as the Saudis and their allies sought to unite the peninsula. Some members of the Rasheed family left the country and went into voluntary exile, mostly to Kuwait.

== Iraq ==
The Shammar is one of Iraq's largest tribes, along with the Jubur, with more than 1.5 million members. Under the leadership of Banu Mohamad, known as Al Jarba, there was a massive exodus into Iraq. Most of the Shammar in Iraq gave up their nomadic lifestyles to settle in major cities, especially the Jazirah plain, the area between the Tigris and Euphrates from Baghdad to Mosul. Droughts triggered several migrations of Shammar into Iraq, which, according to the Ottoman census upon its annexation, had only 1.5 million inhabitants. The Shammar took over the Jazirah after displacing the Al-Ubaid tribe to Kirkuk. According to Sheikh Abdullah Humaid Alyawar, the son of the sheikh of Shammar, in Iraq the total population of Shammar is estimated to be more than 1.5 million. The Shammar Al-Sayeh, a tribal confederation of tribes from Shammar, is the branch of Shammar who were independent of Aljarba's authority. Shammar is composed of groups such as Al-Zuhairy and Al-Towej in Najaf.

The Shammar became one of the most powerful Iraqi tribes, owning vast tracts of land and provided strong support of the Hashemite monarchy. Shammar power was threatened after the overthrow of the monarchy in 1958 by Abdul-Karim Qassem, and the Shammar welcomed Ba'athist rule. After the overthrow of Saddam Hussein, Ghazi al-Yawar, from the Al Jarbah clan, was unanimously chosen as interim president. Ghazi Al-Yawar's uncle is the current Sheikh of Sheikhs of Shammar.

== Syria ==
The Shammar tribe have been present in Syria since at least the 1920s when rivalry between Syrian and Iraqi Shammar culminated in violence reported by the League of Nations in 1926. Syrian Shammar Sheikh Diham al Hadi, the paramount Shammar sheikh in Syria, conducted an attack at the end of March 1926 upon 'Ajil al Yawar, a Sheikh of the Iraqi Shammar. In April 1959 however, the CIA's Foreign Broadcast Information Service reported that the Iraqi and Syrian branches of the Shammar were able to bury their differences, both joining an alliance with the Syrian Baath Party against a common enemy.

The leader of the Syrian Shammar was Sheikh Humaydi Daham al-Hadi. His son Bandar al-Humaydi was military leader of the al-Sanadid Forces, a Shammar militia formed in 2013 nominally to protect the tribe's interests from ISIL.

== Timeline ==
- 328 Namar inscription on the tombstone of Imru al-Qays I ibn Amr, second king of the Lakhmids, mentions the "city of Shammar."
- 1171–1172: Abda of Shammar tribe joins Saladin against the crusaders.
- 1301: First mention of the tribe Shammar, as a separate tribe in the book Masalik Alabsar by Ibn Fadhl.
- 1417: The city of Al Majma'ah is built by Abdullah ibn Saif Alwibari Alshammari.
- 1455: IBN Ali Emirate is formed under Ali Alkabeer bin Attya Bin Jaffar after the defeat and exile of former ruler of Jabal Tayy Bhaij Bin Theeban Alzubaidi.
- 1446: The first known battle between Shammar and Anazah is fought by Bin Baqar of Alaslam and Altayyar of Anazah.
- 1489: Husain Al ali is dubbed Prince of the desert Shamar's Dominion is established in Najd.
- 1517: The Ottoman Empire is established.
- c. 1521: the name Shammar becomes prominent.
- 1522: Shammar backs Bani Khalid against Aluyonien.
- 1609: Shammar unites with Bani Khalid against the sharif of Makkah.
- 1690: First Exodus into Iraq.
- 1696: Shammar raids Baghdad.
- 1744: The Emirate of Diriyah, the first Saudi Kingdom, established.
- 1749–1762: Shammar raids reach northern Baghdad despite the strong ruler Sulaiman Abu Layla Pasha.
- 1750–1760: Wahabi movement emerges.
- 1764: Migration of individuals of Alzagareet of Abdah to Southern Iraq under the leadership of Yousef bin Mohammed bin Nasrallah
- 1765: alaslam and zaghareet between Hīt and Karabla.
- 1776: Sheikh Mutlag bin Thanian invades Alhafeer area.
- 1779: Jabal Shammar falls to Saudi domination.
- 1781 (or 1791): Battle of Aladwa between Aljarba and Ibn Saud.
- 1780: Shammar joins Bani Khalid and Muntafig and the Sharifate of Mecca to conquer Alsaud.
- 1790: Wahabis raid southern Iraq early in the year.
- 1790: Shammar is allied with the Sherif of Mecca against Alasaud.
- 1791: Al Saud launches a surprise attack on Shammar and wins two battles 70 miles south-east of Hayel.
- 1791: Late in the year some Shamaris join other Bedouins in an attack against Alsaud; Muslit bin Mutlag is killed.
- 1791: Mutlag Aljarba takes Shammar to safer places in southern Iraq.
- 1792: Sheikh Muhammad ibn Abd al-Wahhab dies; Wahabi forces raid southern Iraq, defeating Bani Khalid.
- 1792: Mohamad Bin Abdul mohsin Bin Ali (also believed to be Alsamn Alurabi) becomes Emir of Hail.
- 1795: Saudi forces attack Shammar near Samawa and Mutlag is killed. (Some say this occurred in 1797 in the Battle of Alabyadh, and that Mutlag died and Shammar entered Aljazeera in the same year.)
- 1797: Alsaud attacks north of Soug Alshiokh; Faris Bin Mohammad Aljarba takes over; Wahabis are turned back.
- 1798: A large coalition including Shammar, Alubaid and Ottoman armies – more than 500 strong – goes to Basra; Mutlag dies.
- 1799: Ali Basha leaves Zuabir with new allies from Almuntafig, Althufair and Bani Khalid; they fight for a year.
- 1800: Truce is broken and an indecisive battle with the Wahabis takes place near Karbala.
- 1800: Incident between Faris al Jarba and Shiekh Alamoud Fayez Ibn Huthayl.
- 1801: Wahabi pressure on southern Iraq subsides; Shammar migrates to reach Jabal Sinjar in northern Iraq. The Shiite holy city of Karbala is raided by 10,000 men on 6,000 camels; the plunder Hussien's tomb.
- 1802: Late that year, a campaign against the Yezedi is launched by the Ottomans, Shammar, and Alubaid.
- 1803: Ottoman seeks Shammar's help in a campaign against the Al Ubaid mutiny, but the campaign fails.
- 1805: Faris Aljarba decisively defeats Alubaid.
- 1808–1812: Baghdad comes under Saudi threats.
- 1809: Anti-Thufair rebellion; Ottoman campaign under Faris Aljarba and Sulaimna Basha Alsaghir, Althufair and Rola Triomph.
- 1814: Shammar Aljarba raids several Iraqi cities.
- 1815: Khazaal, Zuabair, and Shammar rebel against Said Basha. Uniza, Alubaid, and Thufair tribes put down the rebellion; Shiekh Banaia is killed in battle.
- 1818: Shiekh Sfoug bin Faris Aljarba takes over. Mohamad Bin Abdul mohsin Bin Ali is beheaded by Ibrahim Pasha and sent to his father Mohamad Ali Pasha in Egypt. The Saudi capital of Dirayiya is besieged by 2,000 cavalry and 56,000 infantry with 12 guns and falls to the Ottomans.
- 1820s: Mohamad bin Ali is killed and his brother Saleh becomes ruler of Hail.
- 1820 opposition to Bin Ali formed by Abdulla Bin Rasheed against Ali bin Abdul Mohsen. Attempts to his arrest sends Abdullah Bin Rasheed to Iraq fleeing.
- 1822 Shk. Sfoug aljarba defeats a 40,000-strong Persian army meant for Baghdad.
- 1822: Alawajya wars begins.
- 1823: Village of Anna is bequeathed to Sfoug by the Ottoman Pasha of Baghdad for his role in defeating the Persian invasion.
- 1824: Uniza raids Shammar and loots their prized Arabian horses.
- 1830: Adwan bin Twala Shk alaslam and Oqab alawaji Shk of Inn Sulayman of Anazah who lives South of Hail. There had been a long standing conflict between them. They met to stop the Siege of Ras. Ogab challenges the outnumbered Adwan. Adwan captures Ogab during battle and wins. He pardons Ogab and releases him. (كتاب من شيم العرب د فهد المالك)
- 1831: Shammar aids the Ottoman siege of Baghdad to remove its rebellious Dawood Pasha.
- 1832: Shammar retaliates against Ali Pasha and declares rebellion.
- 1832: The Egyptian invasion of Syria forces Uniza to leave the Syrian desert and enter Aljazera with 35,000 men.
- 1833: Two Pashas join the rebellion and attack the Yazidis in Sinjar to stop their looting.
- July 1833: Shammar besieges Baghdad and intercepts all Ottoman correspondence 20–30 miles north. Abdullah bin Rashid, the future founder of the emirate of Ha'il is said to have taken part.
- 1833: Five thousand Ottomans under Mohamed Pasha leave a rebellion near Hilla and attack Shammar; the siege remains active.
- 1833: Late in the year, Shammar moves north to help Mosul's Pasha; the siege is broken and Ottomans launch a successful surprise attack.
- 1834: Rogue Sheikh Shlash of Shammar attacks Uniza in support of the Ottomans; Sfoug supports Shlash with 2,000 men; Uniza wins.
- 1835: Uniza crosses the Euphrates and leaves Aljazeera.
- 1835: Shammar is at the peak of its power in Aljazeera and Sfoug Aljarba is Soultan Albar.
- 1835: Rasheed Pasha ambushes Sfoug and his son Farhan and exile both to the Istana.
- 1835: Shammar retaliates by raiding and destroying the fields of Tikrit.
- 1836: Battles ensue between Shammar and Uniza; Sfoug's brother Faris bin Mohamad rules over 12,000 families; Mohamad Ali Pasha's forces reach Yanbo for a second invasion of Arabia.
- 1836: Alrashid establishes the Emirate of Jabal Shammar, centered at Ha'il.
- 1837: Shammar's unity fragments in Iraq.
- 1838: Abdullah bin Rasheed goes to Iraq.
- 1840: Shammar Jarba attacks the Egyptians at Orfa.
- 1841: Anna is taken away from Sfoug.
- 1842: Shammar jarba retaliates by raiding near Alkhabor; there is some internal splintering.
- 1842 Baqaa battle at Baqaa 100 km North of Hail. Shk: N'ais Bin Twala joined the commander Sh. Abdullah Bin Rasheed commanding 2000 men against Quseem Coalition Abdul Aziz albrayyan emir of Braida, Qaid bin Mijlad Shk if Dahamsha clan of Unaiza tribe, under the command of yahay bin Sulaim aka. Su'oot almajaneen, he is killed in battle.
- 1843: Sfoug is reappointed as Shammar's Shiekh.
- 1844: Shammar Jarba raids Uniza near Harran; it is a famine year.
- 1844: In summer Uniza brings 20,000 men and raids the area between Baghdad and Mosul.
- 1844: Shammar, with only 1000 men, allies with the Kurdish cavalry to expel Uniza; Fighting continues in the fall.
- 1845: Uniza seeks a truce, giving 15,000 sheep, 3,000 camels and 8 horses.
- 1845: Shammar Jarba defeats Uniza. War spoils were 7,000 sheep; famine strikes Shammar.
- 1845: The Emirate of Hail is declared.
- 1846: Farhan becomes the Sheikh of Sheikhs; of the other six brothers, the runner-up is Abdulkareem.
- 1846?: Abdulkarim declares a revolution against the Ottomans; Naser Alsadoun delivers him to the Ottomans and he is hanged.
- 1847: Internal fighting between rebellious Shammaris; Sfoug is assassinated and beheaded by Najeeb Pasha (some say 1857).
- December 1847: Shammar raids Aljazeera; Najeeb Pasha appoints Oda as Sheikh.
- 1848: In spring Uniza raids Shammar under Daham Ibn Gaishish and Ibn Hath-thal.
- 1850–1851: Abdi Pasha stops his Shammar rations: Shammar raids southern Baghdad.
- 1852: Shammar defeat Anazah and Alqusaim in the Battle of Baqa.
- 1853–1856: Ottoman control outside of big cities plummets.
- 1855: Ibn Sulaim raids Hail and kills wild Alaslamya in Ramdhan.
- 1856: Ibn Rashid kills Ibn Sulaim in Ramdhan as vengeance.
- 1859: The feast for a wolf by Mukazi Ibn Sayed.
- 1871: Ubaid Al Rashid dies of old age (according to oral tradition).
- 1876: Mohammed bin Abdullah Al Rashid capitalizes on internal disputes between Abdullah and Saud bin Faisal and enters Alqaseem.
- 1882: siege of Aridh ended by Mohamad Ibn adullah bin Rashid. Abdullah ibn Faisal retreats (1299 Hijri)
- 1882: Mohammed bin Abdullah Al Rashid and Hassan bin Muhana defend the town of Almujama against Abdulla bin Faisal.
- 1883: Arwa Battle between Utaiba and Shammar, Utaiba is defeated. Utaiba's leaders were Hendi bin Humaid, Terky bin Rubaian and Ghazi bin Mohaya.
- 1887: Mohammed Al Rashid is asked in a poem by Mohammed bin Jasem of Qatar to help against a coalition of other emirates. The coalition is defeated and Barzan Tower is built in Qatar to commemorate the occasion.
- 1887–1888 Mohammed Almehhad Emir of Jabal Shammar Emirate, leads an army to respond to Bin Thani's plea for help to face his enemies reprisal for their defeat in Khanour.
- 1891: Battle of Mulayda and the end of the second Saudi state
- 1895: Almulaida battles against Alquseem.
- 1897: Battle of Binban; all of Najd is under Mohammed bin Rasheed.
- March 1901: Battle of Alsarif: 1200 Shammaris lost 400 men under Abdul Aziz Almutab Alrashid to defeat an invasion of Hail that is attempted Emir of Kuwait, Muabarak Alkabeer, who lost 9000 men of the 64,000 men he commanded. The coalition included many some which Alsadoun of Al-Muntafiq, Aldeweesh, Bedoor, abalkhail of Qaseem, Bin Mehana Bin hathleen of Ajman, Shafi of Hawajer, Alsubaie tribe, Qahtan under Hashr bin wraik، awazem tribe under Mubarak Bin Durai', alrashaida tribe under Mohammed bin Qurainees.
- 1903–1907: Saudi–Rashidi War, also known as the battles over Qasim
- 1907: Aljanazah is assassinated and Hail is ruled by the sons of Sheikh Humoud bin Ubaid Alrasheed.
- 1910: Battel of Ajumaima: Saud Abdulaziz bin Rasheed Shammar defeats Alruoula and Anazah. Hail is ruled by Aljanazah under the guardianship of Alsabhan.
- March 1910: Battle of Hadya: 500 Shammari horsemen join Alsadoun's forces of 4000 in a battle again Sabah backed by Abdulaziz Alsaud and defeat them.
- 1914: Zamel Alsabhan is killed.
- 1915: Battle of Jarrab: Ibn Rasheed is victorious against Ibn Saud; death of a British intelligence officer called Shakespeare.
- 1916: Battle of Abu Ajaj: Shammar defeats Alshfair and Albudoor.
- 1917 battle of Yateb: Faisal Bin abdulaziz and his brother Saud defeat Shammar.
- 1919: Alshuaibah battle : Faisal Bin abdulaziz and his brother Saud defeat Shammar.
- 1920: Zuba participates in Iraq's 1920 revolution against the British.
- 1921: Conquest of Ha'il by the Saudis and surrender of the Emirate of Jabal Shammar by its Al Rashid ruler Mohammed Bin Tallal.
- 1921 Barzan Palace is leveled after Faisal bin Abdulaziz and Saud Bin Abdulaziz lay Siege to Hail for three months.
- 1926: Syrian Shammar Sheikh Diham al Hadi attack upon 'Ajil al Yawar, a Sheikh of the Iraqi Shammar.
- 1932: population of Hail is estimated at 20,000; Badu Shammar at 150,000–200,000 of which 30% are Alaslam, 37% Abde, 25% Sinjara, 7.5% Tuman.
- 1948: Shammar is driven out of the Negev south of Palestine by Israeli forces;
- 16 February 1948: Battle of Zaraa.
- 10 April 1948: Almanara.
- 2004: Ghazi Mashal Ajil al-Yawar becomes the first president of Iraq after the fall of Baghdad

== Main sections ==
=== Al Aslam ===
Clans:

- Al Manee' -Twalah, Albu Fradi (Twalah), Fayid, Masud, and Kamel
- Wahab – Qder, Muhammed, Jathel
- Al Sultah – Al Jarba the Sheikhs of Shammar come from this clan
- Aladhadh
- Al Khashman
- Al Wajaan

=== Abdah ===
Clans:

- Al Jaafar – rulers of Jabal Shammar come from this clan.
- Al Awad – clan that is from iraq and has large influence and vast history in the central region of iraq
- Al Rubaeya – sub clan of Rubeya Al Webbar, Al Ata, Zagareet, Al Jadi, Al Mohissen
- Al Yihya – one of its famous Families are: Al Sleet, Al Mufadal and Al Jundah

=== Zoba' ===
Clans:

- AlWetaid, leaders of Al Faddaghah.
- Zoba' Al Mathlothah.
- Al Khrusah, Some Leaders of Shammar [[]] come from this clan.
- Sinjarah:
  1. Al Thabit
  2. Al Ghafilah
  3. Al Zameel, sometimes referred to as Al Souid or Al Faddaghah.
  4. Al Zomail
