= Bandar bin Talal Al Rashid =

Emir of Jabal Shammar (1850–1869)

Emir of Jabal Shammar
- Reign: 1869
- Predecessor: Mutaib bin Abdullah Al Rashid
- Successor: Muhammad bin Abdullah Al Rashid
- Born: c. 1850
- Died: 1869 (aged 18–19)
Names
- Bandar bin Talal bin Abdullah bin Ali
- House: Rashidi dynasty
- Father: Talal bin Abdullah

Bandar bin Talal Al Rashid (Arabic: بندر بن طلال الرشيد; c. 1850 – 1869) was one of the rulers of the Emirate of Jabal Shammar. His very brief reign barely lasted a year. He had killed his uncle, Mutaib, to become the emir and was murdered by his other uncle, Muhammad, who ruled the Emirate from 1869 until 1897.

== Biography ==
Bandar was born in around 1850. He was the eldest son of the second emir Talal bin Abdullah and a grandson of Abdullah bin Ali Al Rashid who founded the Emirate in 1836.

Bandar and his brother, Badr, murdered their uncle and the emir, Mutaib bin Abdullah, in Barzan Palace in 1869, and Bandar became the emir of Jabal Shammar. The reason for the killing of Mutaib was his maltreatment of them. Due to this incident an intra-familial and succession crisis occurred, and the older senior members of the family including Bandar's uncle Muhammad bin Abdullah and his great uncle Ubayd left Hail for Riyadh. However, the exile of Muhammad had very undesired effects on the commercial activities since he was very competent in managing the caravan and Hajj-related activities, and Bandar went to Riyadh and asked his uncle to return to Hail who accepted his offer and continued to assume his previous post.

In 1869 Bandar was killed by his uncle, Muhammad bin Abdullah, because of the disputes. Then Muhammad bin Abdullah ruled the Emirate until 1897. Following this, Bandar's brothers went into exile. However, another report suggests that Muhammad bin Abdullah executed Bandar's brothers and other members of the family following the murder of Bandar.

Bandar bin Talal Al Rashid House of Rashid
Regnal titles
Preceded by Mutaib bin Abdullah Al Rashid	Emir of the House of Rashid; 1869–1869	Succeeded by Muhammad bin Abdullah Al Rashid
