= Mutaib bin Abdullah Al Rashid =

Emir of Jabal Shammar from 1868 to 1869

Emir of Jabal Shammar
- Reign: 1868–1869
- Predecessor: Talal bin Abdullah Al Rashid
- Successor: Bandar bin Talal Al Rashid
- Died: 1869; Ha'il
- Issue: Abdulaziz bin Mutaib Al Rashid
Names
- Mutaib bin Abdullah bin Ali
- House: Rashidi dynasty
- Father: Abdullah bin Ali Al Rashid

Mutaib bin Abdullah Al Rashid (Arabic: متعب بن عبد الله الرشيد; died January 1869) was the third ruler of the Emirate of Jabal Shammar whose reign was very brief between 1868 and 1869.

== Biography ==
Mutaib was one of the sons of Abdullah bin Ali Al Rashid who established the Emirate of Jabal Shammar in 1836 and ruled it until 1848. He had two brothers, Talal and Muhammad.

Mutaib succeeded his older brother, Talal, in 1868. In January 1869 he was shot and killed in the Barzan Palace by his nephews, Bandar bin Talal and Badr bin Talal. One of the reasons for Mutaib's murder, cited by R. Bayly Winder, was the maltreatment of Bandar and his siblings by their uncle and emir Mutaib. Following the killing of Mutaib, Bandar became the emir of Jabal Shammar and the family members left Ha'il for Riyadh where they were given refuge by the Al Saud.

One of Mutaib's sons, Abdulaziz, was adopted by his uncle, Muhammad, and ruled the Emirate between 1897 and 1906.

Mutaib bin Abdullah Al Rashid House of Rashid
Regnal titles
Preceded by Talal bin Abdullah Al Rashid	Emir of the House of Rashid; 1868–1869	Succeeded by Bandar bin Talal Al Rashid
