= Abdullah bin Mutaib Al Rashid =

Saudi Arabian politician (1906–1947)

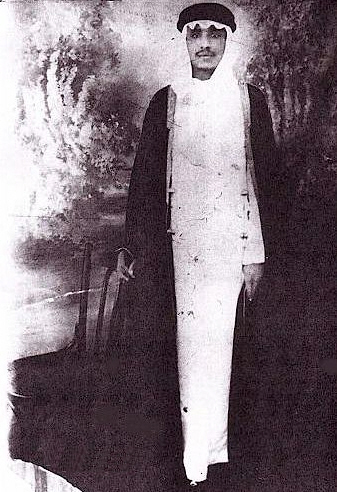

Emir of Jabal Shammar
- Reign: March 29, 1920 – August 1921
- Predecessor: Saud bin Abdulaziz
- Successor: Muhammad bin Talal
- Born: 1906; Ha'il, Emirate of Jabal Shammar
- Died: 1946 (aged 39–40); Riyadh, Saudi Arabia
Names
- Abdullah Al Mutaib Al-Aziz Al Mutaib Al Abdullah Al Ali Al Rasheed Al Shamri
- House: House of Rashid

Prince Abdullah Al-Mutaib Al-Rasheed (1906–1946) (known as Abdullah II; Arabic: عبد الله المتعب العبد العزيز المتعب العبد الله العلي الرشيد الشمري) was the 11th Emir of the Emirate of Jabal Shammar, from 1920 until 1921.

== Biography ==
He was a prominent member of the al-Rashid dynasty and son to Emir Mitab II. His father, Mutaib, served as Emir for nine months in 1906, before being killed alongside his brothers by Sultan bin Hammoud Al Rashid. At the end of March 1920, his cousin, Emir Saud ibn Abd al-Aziz, was assassinated by his cousin Abdullah ibn Talyah, who was shot dead by one of the emir's servants. Abdullah bin Mutaib would succeed him as Emir, at the age of 13, but members of the Al Sabhan family would rule on his behalf.

With the rise of Abd al-Aziz ibn Saud, Emir of Najd, a longtime enemy of the Emirate of Jebel Shammar, Abdullah decided to make an alliance with Hussein bin Ali, king of Hejaz, who enjoyed British support. In response, Ibn Saud, in March 1921, launched a military campaign against the Emirate of Jebel Shammar. In April, Abdullah bin Mutaib was defeated and retreated to Ha'il. At this time, Muhammad ibn Talal, the governor of Al-Jawf, swore allegiance and promised to defend Ha'il. However, Abdullah, who had no faith in it, ordered that Muhammad be arrested and sent to prison.

Abdullah Al Rashid decided to stay in protection within his fortress. But when recourses ran out, he entered into negotiations with Abd al-Aziz ibn Saud. The latter insisted on a complete and unconditional surrender, which did not suit Abduallah. The inhabitants of Ha'il managed to defend their leader and they continued to hold the siege, which was accompanied by small skirmishes.

Soon the hierarchy released Muhammad ibn Talal from prison and overthrew Abdullah. Abdullah bin Mutaib lived in exile in the city of Riyadh until his death in 1946.
