= Aladhadh =

Arabic house belonging to tribe in Arabia

The House of Aladhadh is an Arabic house belonging to one of two major tribes in Arabia; Shammar and Uniza. The Uniza descendants are of the Aldabra clan and centered in Authal in Saudi Arabia. The Shammar progeny named Aladhadh is of the Alaslam tribe of the Shammar. People with this last name are on both sides of the Iraqi-Saudi border. The contributions of the House of Aladhadh to Iraq's history makes them the focus of this article as opposed to a totally different branch of the same tribe with the same nam who live sixty miles southeast of Ha'il. Specifically, the Shks of alMasoud tribe who descend from Shk Hamad bin Husain bin Abdullah Alrashed who left to Iraq from Najd.

== History ==
The Aladhadh clan of Shammar is still based 50 miles (80 km) southeast of Ha'il in modern-day Saudi Arabia. The House of Aladhadh is first reported to have settled in alhassaniya on the border of kerbala after a war with alsarhan clan over the Shka Hamda's refusal to marry her maternal cousin from Alsarhan tribe. It is believed that Shk Mohammed Bin hamad left to Najaf then to Nasriyah.

Almasoud tribe separated from Alaslam tribe of Shammar in 1707. This would be consistent with Shk Mohammad's settling in Najaf. Upon arrival to Najaf city in Iraq, he married from the prominent Arab houses such as Alshamsa and Alhabubi. The "Aladhadh" name was etched into Iraq's map when ShkMohammed built a famous an artificial river named after them Aladhadh River "نهر العضاضة".

The House of Aladhadh was one of the main builders of the city of Nasiryah. Their ownership of one of the first registered houses in Nasirya places them there before the establishment of the municipal office in 1878. This is would be during the reign of Alsaadon whose emirate in Nasirya lasted 1530–1918. Haj Ali bin Shk Mohamad Aladahdh was the city's first elected mayor. Shk Mohamad Aladhadh is the son of Shk Hamad Bin Hussein Bin Abdullah Alrashed. Abudllah Alrashed is the son of Frair bin Marmous Bin Masoud from the Alaslam branch of Shammar.

There is evidence that some Aladhadh clansmen had moved from Nejd to Alkhmasiya which is located 17 kilometers southwest of Soug Alshiokh, Alkhmasiya was first established in 1881. The population of which reached 5000 by 1912.

Timeline of Leadership 1706 Shk Shabib Bin habib is appointed Shk of Qashaam by Ali Pasha

1707 Shk Hamad Aladhadh separates Almasoud from alasalam Under his banner after Mushaihed Battle

Shk Farhan takes over tribe leadership becomes shk ( assuming 30 years per generation, 1737-1794)

Shk Musare Bin Farahn takes over ( assuming 30 years per generation, 1794-1824)

Talal Bin Musare Bin Farhan ( assuming 30 years per generation, 1824-1854)

Hutaimi Bin Musare Bin Farahn is Shk ( assuming 30 years per generation; 1854-1884)

Ibrahim Alhutaimi dies during the reign of his brother Shk Saud

In 1914 Almasoud participated in Shuaiba battles under the banner of Shk Saud Alhutaimi Alfarhan Aladhadh.

In 1915 Shk Saud Alhutaimi Dies In 1915 abdulmihsen Alfawaz becomes Shk becomes Shk of Alfurair In 1915 Abulmuhsen Saud Alhutaimi Becomes Shk

1939 Muteb Bin Saud Alhutaimi becomes shk after the death of shk Abdulmiuhen Bin Saud Alhutaimi

1952 Sulaiman Bin Muteb Bin Saud alhutaimi becomes shk after the death of his father

1962 Shk Abdul Munim Alfawaz dies Abudlwahed alsumarmad takes over 1972 Shk Sulaiman Bin Muteb Bin Saud alhutaimi Dies 1999 Sabah Nouri alsumarmad becomes shk

Ali Aladahdh, son of sheik Mohammed Aladahdh, owned vast tracts of land on the banks of the Euphrates River,

In 1915, Aladhadh gave refuge to one of the Iraqi heroes who resisted the British invasion Mohamed Said Alhaboobi and Mohsen Alhakim the secr3tary general of the Great Raisstance. He was washed and buried in that house. For a national hero, the Aladahdh clan built a shrine to commemorate as valiant efforts for his country. People from all over Iraq came to visit and pay their respects.

In 1920, Aladhadh family participated in the 1920 revolution against British occupation.

In 1948 Mohamad Aladhadh became a soccer player in one of the city's two teams. In 1958, the Aladhadh family represented the province of Dhi Qar in the Iraqi National Congress the highest legislative body in Iraq under the Hashemite royal Family.

In 1969 the poet Adel Hadi Aladhadh was founder of the first national Colloquial Poetry Festival.

In 2023, Amer Aladhadh became adviser to the Prime minister of Iraq and the CEO of the Reform Management Cell. He earned his PhD at the University of California, Irvine under the supervision of Donald G. Saari. Formerly, and economic expert in the State of Qatar and leading global the PPP directorate.

== Leadership ==
Very similar to tribal leadership, the Aladhadh have an ʿamīd. This position is akin to an elected sheikh. The members of the clan tacitly vote on the leadership by appealing to Amid to represent them. The Amid of the clan was Dr. Naim Aladhadh.

A secularist, educated at Caltech Ref. and MIT, and well liked, Dr. Naim Aladhadh was considered by many inside and outside of Iraq, particularly in the U.S., to be a suitable replacement for Saddam Hussein. His efforts to topple Saddam's regime resulted in his assassination in 1992. To avoid the embarrassment of killing a UN diplomat, the assassination was claimed to be a car accident.

Dr. Naim Aladhadh established the Human Rights Foundation in the University of North Wales in 1964. During the late seventies Naim Aladhadh was a leading figure in establishing the National Computer Center in Iraq ("Almarkaz Alqowmi Lilhasibat"). He was also the Cochair of the Council for The Transfer of Technology. He founded the Iraqi center for technical studies. His numerous contributions to Iraq's development earned him the fame name "aldoctor" meaning The Doctor.

In 1988, after the end of the Iraq-Iran war, he was transferred to the Ministry of Higher Education as a lecturer in one of his fields of academic speciality, electrical engineering. Later, he joined the UN ASCWA, as on Economic development advisor. At that time, he became active in a move to topple Saddam Hussein. He had contacted Dr. Ayad Allawi to help with his revolutionary efforts. Dr. Alawi later became prime minister. In 1992, on an empty highway between Iraq and Jordan a staged traffic accident took the life of Dr. Aladhadh. No evidence the actual accident was ever presented.

After his death, the leadership was not clearly transferred.

After the fall of Hussien's regime, many considered Dr. Ali Aladhadh a candidate to lead the clan. A contributor to Iraq's liberation, Ali Aladhadh and a long time oppose to Saddam's regime. He was ambushed with his pregnant wife on his way to the hospital in 2006 by Iraqi insurgents. Many blame the leadership for notproviding security to such a senior member of the party. His death was another significant loss to the clan.

Representing the Adhamia area of Baghdad is Ryadh Aladhadh. A doctor and a philanthropist, he has spoken against Long term American presence and against violence in Iraq. His life is the centerpiece of the documentary My Country, My Country. He also had to flee the country for fear of assassination. He later returned as the head of the provincial Council of Baghdad and represents the largest Sunni Area in Baghdad.
