= Saudi conquest of Hail =

1921 Saudi military campaign

- Part of the Unification of Saudi Arabia and the Aftermath of World War I
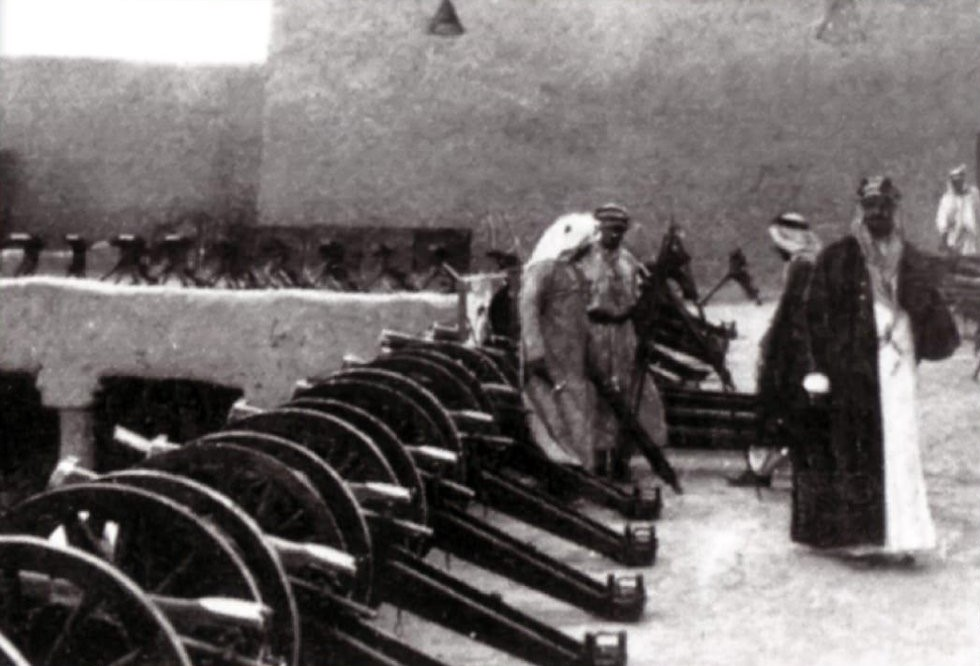
- Ibn Saud inspecting the captured Ottoman weapons after the surrender of the Emirate of Jabal Shammar
Date	6 September – 2 November 1921 (1 month, 3 weeks and 6 days)
Location	Hail, Emirate of Jabal Shammar (present-day Hail Province, Saudi Arabia)
Result	Saudi victory
Territorial changes	Annexation of the Emirate of Jabal Shammar by the Third Saudi State

Belligerents
Third Saudi State; Sultanate of Nejd	Emirate of Jabal Shammar (surrendered)

Commanders and leaders
(Sultanate of Nejd) Ibn Saud	(Emirate of Jabal Shammar) Muhammad bin Talal (surrendered) (POW)

Casualties and losses
+365 killed	363 killed

The Saudi conquest of Hail, also known as the Third Saudi–Rashidi War or the Fall of Hail, was a conflict between the Third Saudi State and the Emirate of Jabal Shammar, led by its final Rashidi ruler, Muhammad bin Talal. The Saudi forces were led by Ibn Saud. On 2 November 1921, Rashidi resistance collapsed, and the ruler of Jabal Shammar surrendered to Saudi forces, marking the end of the last Ottoman ally in the Arabian Peninsula.

== Aftermath ==
Following the surrender, Ibn Saud imprisoned Muhammad bin Talal and compelled him to divorce one of his wives, Noura bint Sibhan, whom Ibn Saud subsequently married. Ibn Saud later divorced Noura and went on to marry Jawaher, a daughter of Muhammad from another of his wives.

== Naming ==
The Emirate of Jabal Shammar had its capital in the city of Hail, and was therefore also referred to as the "Emirate of Hail". The Saudi conquest of Hail is sometimes incorrectly identified as the Second Saudi–Rashidi War.

== See also ==
- First Saudi–Rashidi War
- Second Saudi–Rashidi War
- List of wars involving Saudi Arabia
- List of modern conflicts in the Middle East
