= Muhammad bin Abdullah Al Rashid =

Emir of Jabal Shammar from 1869 to 1897

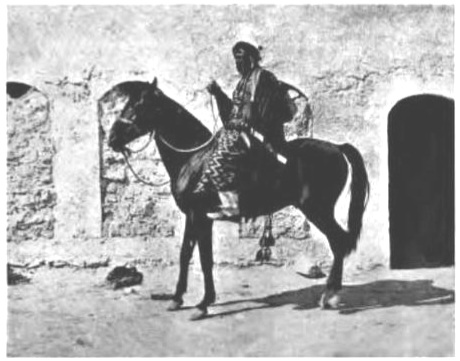
- Rare photo of Muhammad bin Abdullah on horseback

Emir of Jabal Shammar
- Reign: 1869 – 28 November 1897
- Predecessor: Bandar bin Talal
- Successor: Abdulaziz bin Mutaib
- Born: 1849
- Died: 28 November 1897 (aged 47–48)
- Issue: None
Names
- Muhammad bin Abdullah bin Ali Al Rashid
- House: Rashidi dynasty
- Father: Abdullah bin Ali Al Rashid

Muhammad bin Abdullah Al Rashid (Arabic: محمد بن عبد الله بن علي الرشيد, died 28 November 1897) was one of the Emirs of Jabal Shammar and is known for defeating the Saudi State, which after being defeated in the battle of Mulayda ceased to exist for a second time in 1891. His reign lasted from 1869 to 1897, and he was the most influential ruler of the Emirate of Jabal Shammar, for which he is called Muhammad the Great.

== Early life ==
Muhammad was the third son of Abdullah bin Rashid, the founder of the Emirate, and the brother of the second Emir, Talal bin Abdullah, and the third Emir, Mutaib bin Abdullah. During the reign of his brothers, Muhammad functioned as the caravan leader securing the commercial activities of the Emirate and guiding the hajj. His caravan activities were between Hail and Iraq through which he acquired both wealth and popularity among locals.

When the Emir Mutaib bin Abdullah was killed by his nephew Bandar who became the emir of Jabal Shammar, the older generation of the dynasty, including Muhammad and his uncle Ubayd left Hail for Riyadh. The exile of Muhammad had very undesired effects on the commercial activities, so Bandar asked his uncle to return to Hail who accepted his offer and resumed his previous post. However, following his return to Hail, Muhammad killed Bandar bin Talal due to the intrafamilial disputes, and Bandar's brothers fled Hail.

== Reign ==
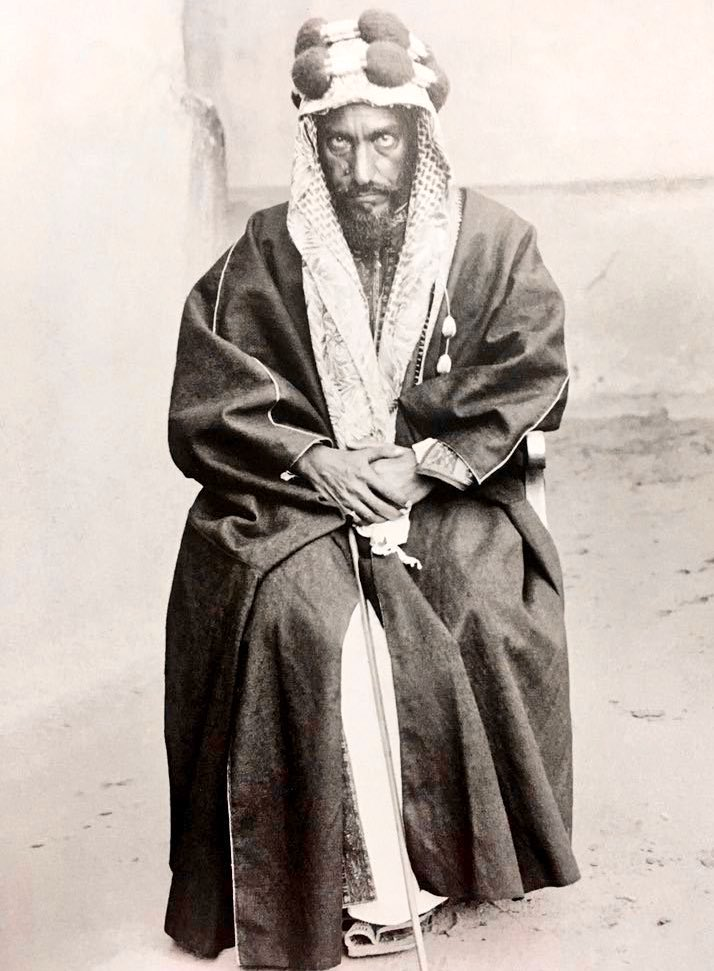
In 1891 Muhammad defeated the forces of Abdul Rahman bin Faisal bin Turki Al Saud, bringing an end to the Second Saudi State.

Soon after this incident Muhammad ascended to the throne in 1869. The Emirate of which base was in Hail expanded during his reign, and Muhammad managed to rule nearly two-thirds of Arabia, including Qassim, Unaizah, Buraidah and Riyadh in addition to the regions near the borders of Aleppo, Damascus, Basra and Oman. Hail became a significant commercial center and had population of nearly 20,000 during Muhammad's reign. His success was partly due to the struggle between the Al Saud members, namely Abdullah bin Faisal and Saud bin Faisal.

Muhammad recaptured Al Jawf region which was seized by Faisal Al Shalaan during the 1860s. However, the people of the region asked for protection from Abdullatif Subhi Pasha, the Ottoman governor of Syria, against the cruel rule of Muhammad in 1872. The Ottomans could not gain the full authority over the region, but installed an eighty-soldier troop there in 1873. The failure of the Ottomans was partly due to the fact that Muhammad was supplied military aid by the British and French authorities. In order to avoid any challenge from Muhammad, the Ottomans strengthened the alliance with him which in turn was very advantageous for Muhammad.

Muhammad became the single strong figure in Najd by 1884. In 1887 he annexed Najd when Abdullah bin Faisal, Emir of Najd, was imprisoned in Riyadh by his nephews, sons of Saud bin Faisal, Muhammad attacked and captured the city to help Abdullah, but instead of reestablishing Abdullah's rule Muhammad appointed a Rashidi governor to the city. The governor was Salim Al Sibhan who was one of the closest allies of Muhammad. In addition, Muhammad liberated Abdullah bin Faisal, but took him to Hail as a hostage. He also brought three sons of Saud bin Faisal to Hail.

Four years later in 1891 Muhammad defeated the Al Saud forces who were the allies of Abdul Rahman, younger brother of Abdullah and Saud, in the battle of Mulayda which ended the Emirate of Najd and led to the exile of the Al Saud family. Following the battle he captured Riyadh and ruled Najd.

== Personal life and death ==
Muhammad married a woman from Aba Al Khail family. He had no child and adopted his nephew, Abdulaziz bin Mutaib. In addition to his native Arabic Muhammad had a good command of Persian and Turkish languages which he had learned while acting as a caravan leader.

On 28 November 1897 Muhammad died of natural causes in Hail. He was succeeded by his adopted son and nephew Abdulaziz.

Muhammad bin Abdullah Al Rashid House of Rashid
Regnal titles
Preceded by Bandar bin Talal Al Rashid	Emir of the House of Rashid; 1869–1897	Succeeded by Abdulaziz bin Mutaib Al Rashid
