= Battle of Mulayda =

1891 battle between emirates of Nejd and Jabal Shammar

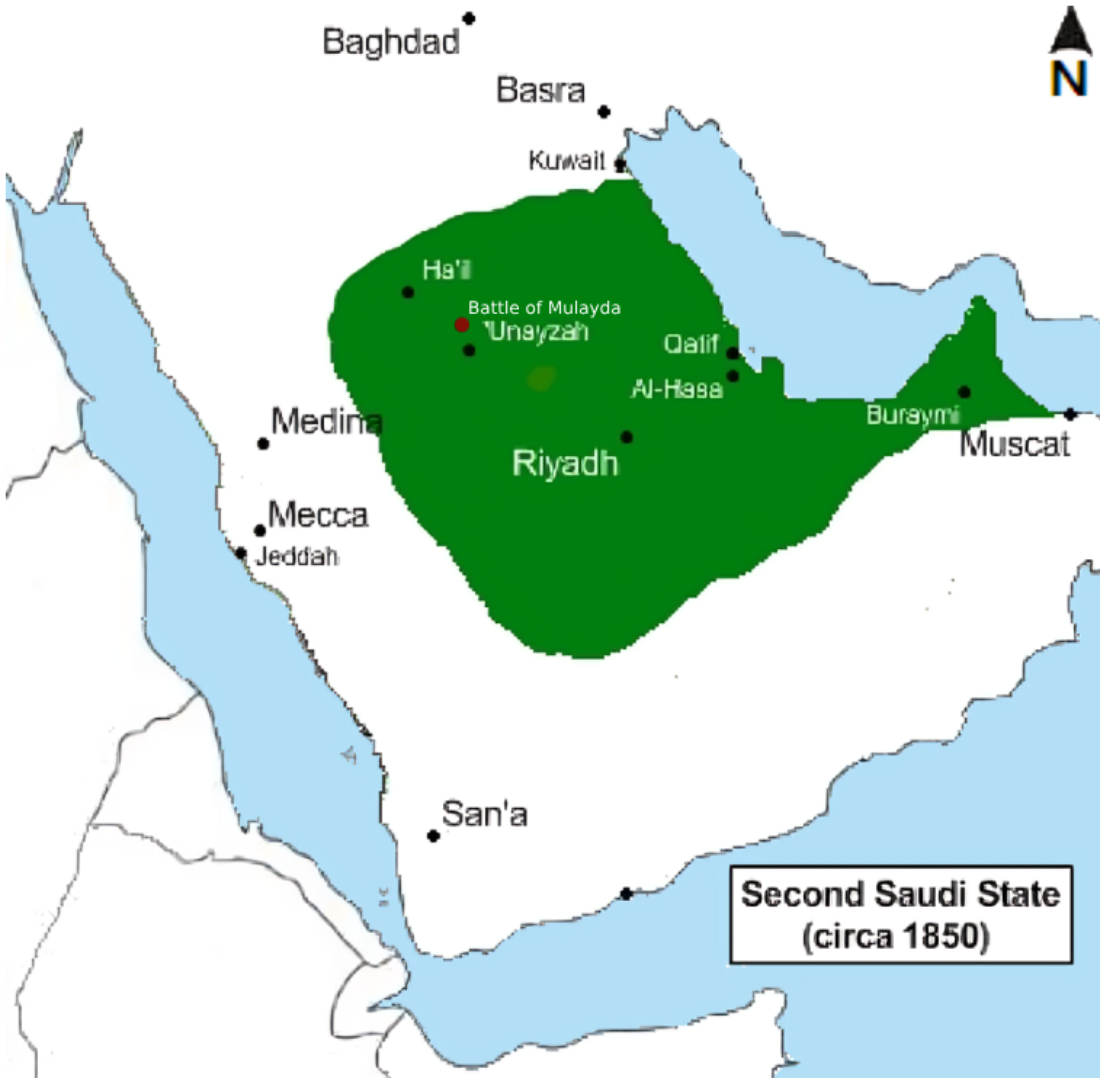
Date	21 January 1891
Location	Al-Qassim (modern day Al-Qassim Province, Saudi Arabia) 29°43′N 39°30′E
Result	Shammar victory

Belligerents
Emirate of Jabal Shammar: Shammar; Harb; Dhafeer	Second Saudi State: Al-Qassim; Mutair; Otaiba

Commanders and leaders
Muḥammad bin ʿAbdullah Al Rashid	Abdul Rahman bin Faisal Al Saud; Abdulaziz bin Abdul Rahman Al Saud; Hassan ibn Muhanna; Zamil ibn Sulaym †

Strength
27,000	24,000

Casualties and losses
Unknown	20.000 killed

The Battle of Mulayda was the last major battle during the period of the Second Saudi State which occurred on 21 January 1891 over issues regarding zakat and the arrest of the Rashidi leader. The Rashidis plotted to end the Saudi state and conquer both the Qassim region and Riyadh. Following the invasion, the Rashidis and their Arab ally clans successfully conquered the Second Saudi State, forcing the House of Saud, led by Abdul Rahman bin Faisal, and their allies to flee.

== Background ==
In 1818, the emir of Nejd, Faisal ibn Turki Al Saud acquired new territories in the Arabian Peninsula following the collapse of the First Saudi state in the aftermath of the Ottoman siege of Diriyah. The House of Saud established the Second Saudi state in 1824. Faisal eventually appointed his heir, Abdullah bin Faisal Al Saud to the throne in the summer of 1865.

Under Abdullah's reign, the Salafist Islamic framework similar to that of the first state was preserved, but it was also marked by plenty of civil strife as he attempted to consolidate power. His brother Saud bin Faisal Al Saud challenged it twice within five years (once in 1871 and again from 1873-1875). Abdullah took power for the final time in 1889, the same year of his death, and his youngest brother Abdul Rahman bin Faisal Al Saud assumed the throne; however, by that point, the state was significantly weakened.

== See also ==
- List of wars involving Saudi Arabia
