= Muhammad bin Talal Al Rashid =

Emir of Jabal Shammar (r. 1921)

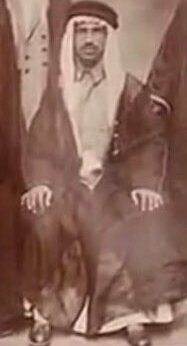
- Rare photo of Muhammad (probably 1920s)

Emir of Jabal Shammar
- Reign: August 1921 – 2 November 1921
- Predecessor: Abdullah bin Mutaib
- Successor: Office abolished (Ibn Saud as Saudi Sultan)
- Born: 1904; Ha'il, Emirate of Jabal Shammar
- Died: 1954 (aged 49–50); Riyadh, Saudi Arabia
- Issue: Princess Jawaher; Princess Wafta; Talal (father of Madawi al-Rasheed)
Names
- Muhammad bin Talal bin Nayef bin Talal bin Abdullah Al Rashid Al Shammari
- House: House of Rashid

Muhammad bin Talal Al Rashid (Arabic: محمد بن طلال الرشيد Muḥammad bin Ṭalāl Āl Rašīd; c. 1904 – 1954) was the twelfth and last emir of Jabal Shammar in Ha'il. He ruled from August 1921 to 2 November 1921.

== Reign ==
Muhammad began his rule in early 1921, after the reign of Emir Abdullah bin Mutaib ended, which signaled the end of the Emirate of Jabal Shammar. Abdulaziz Al Saud, Emir of Nejd and future King of Saudi Arabia, made it his goal to take over the territory of Jabal Shammar. Emir Muhammad, the people of Ha'il, and the Shammar and Bani Tamim tribes fought several battles against the Al Saud forces, but Abdulaziz was triumphant, and the Emirate of Ha'il (Jabal Shammar) was subsumed into the Saudi state. Ha'il fell to Abdulaziz on 2 November 1921. Afterwards, Muhammad bin Talal moved to Riyadh.

== Personal life and death ==
One of Muhammad's wives was Noura bint Sibhan. After defeating Muhmmad, Abdulaziz forced Muhammad to divorce Noura so that he could marry her himself. However, Abdulaziz soon divorced Noura. Next, he married Muhammad's daughter Jawaher (born to some other wife, not Noura).

Upon Abdulaziz's insistence, Muhammad's other daughter, Princess Watfa, was married to Musaid bin Abdulaziz Al Saud, a son of Abdulaziz. Thus, the sisters Jawaher and Watfa became mother-in-law and daughter-in-law to each other. A son born to Watfa and Musaid al-Saud, namely Faisal bin Musaid, assassinated Musaid's half-brother King Faisal on 25 March 1975.

Muhammad bin Talāl's granddaughter is Madawi al-Rasheed.

Muhammad bin Talāl died in Riyadh in 1954, one year after the death of Abdulaziz al-Saud.
