= Qishlah =

Palace in Saudi Arabia

Coordinates: 27.51906°N 41.69442°E

Al-Qishlah Palace
- قصر القشلة (Arabic)
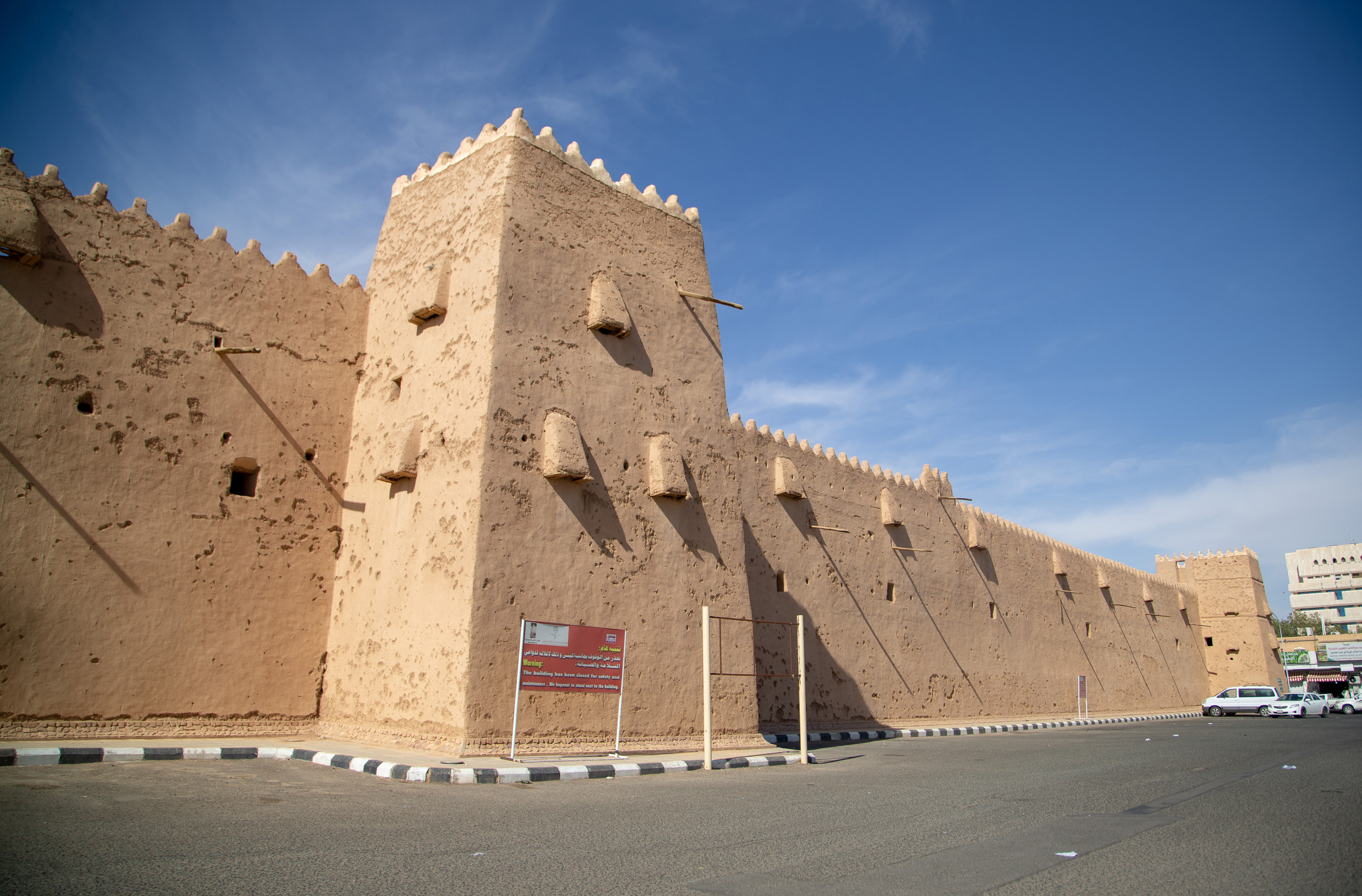
- Qishlah palace in Ha'il
- Interactive map of Al-Qishlah Palace
- Type: Fortress
- Location: Ha'il, Saudi Arabia

History
- Built: 1941–1943
- Original use: Military barracks

Site notes
- Material: Clay, mudbrick and stone
- Architectural style: Najdi architecture

Al-Qishlah Palace (Arabic: قصر القشلة, romanized: Qaṣr al-Qišla) is a historic mudbrick fortress and former military barracks in Ha'il, Saudi Arabia. Commissioned by King Abdulaziz in 1941, it was completed within approximately eighteen months in the Najdi architectural style.

== History ==
Al-Qishlah was built between 1941 and 1943 during the reign of King Abdulaziz as a military barracks for accommodating and training soldiers. Its central courtyard was used for training and military parades, while its rooms served as offices for army officers and the general administration and as storage for weapons. In 2017, the site was included in the first phase of restoration projects under the Custodian of the Two Holy Mosques Cultural Heritage Program.

== Architecture ==
The palace is a rectangular two-storey complex arranged around a central open courtyard. It was constructed from clay, mudbrick and stone, with plaster decorations featuring geometric and botanical motifs characteristic of the traditional architecture of Ha'il. The complex contains 143 rooms, a mosque and eight cylindrical defensive towers.

== Gallery ==
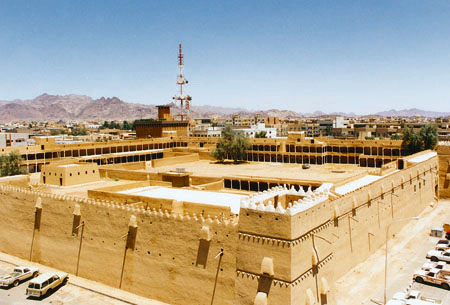
Aerial view of Al-Qishlah Palace

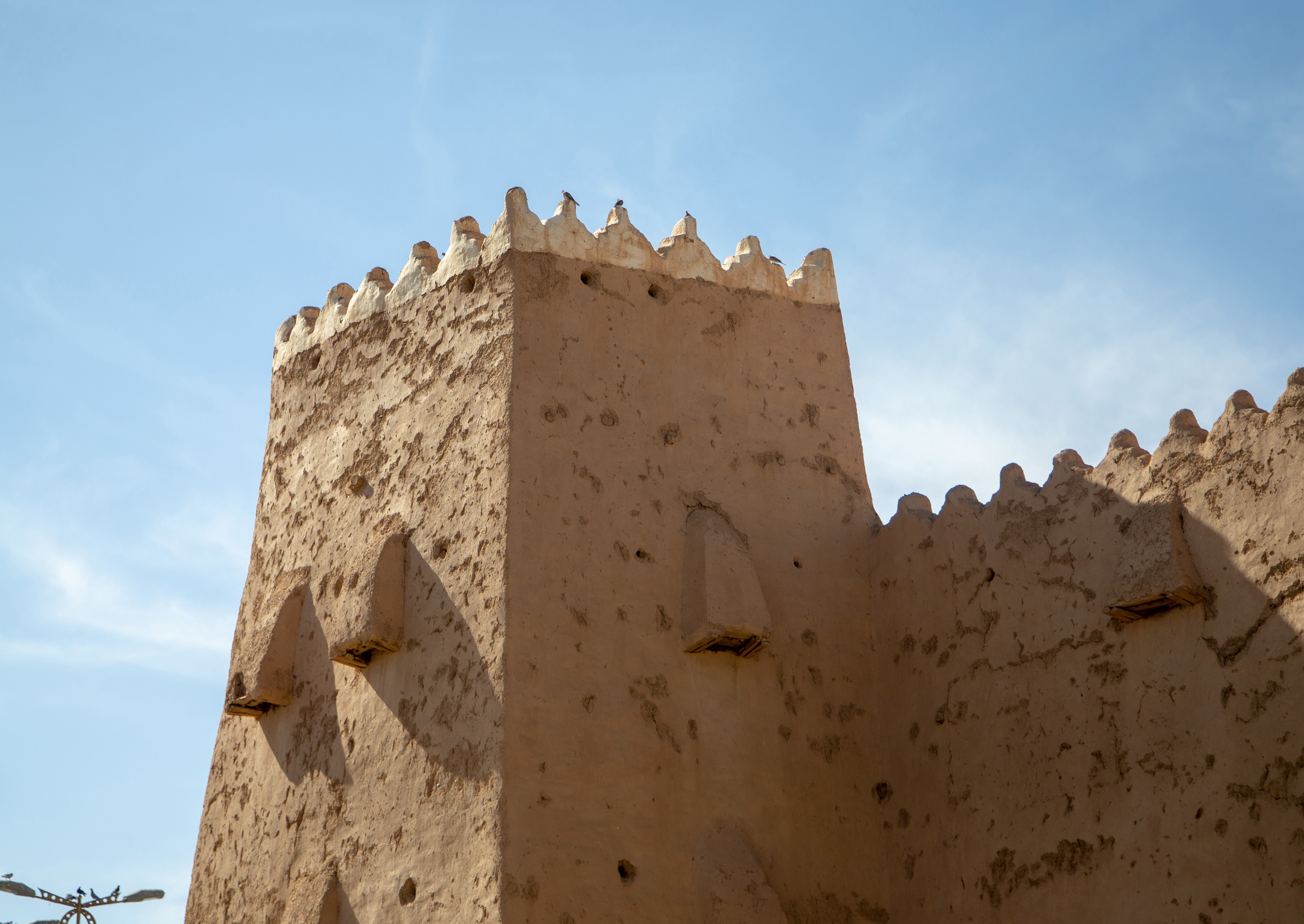
A tower and exterior wall of the palace

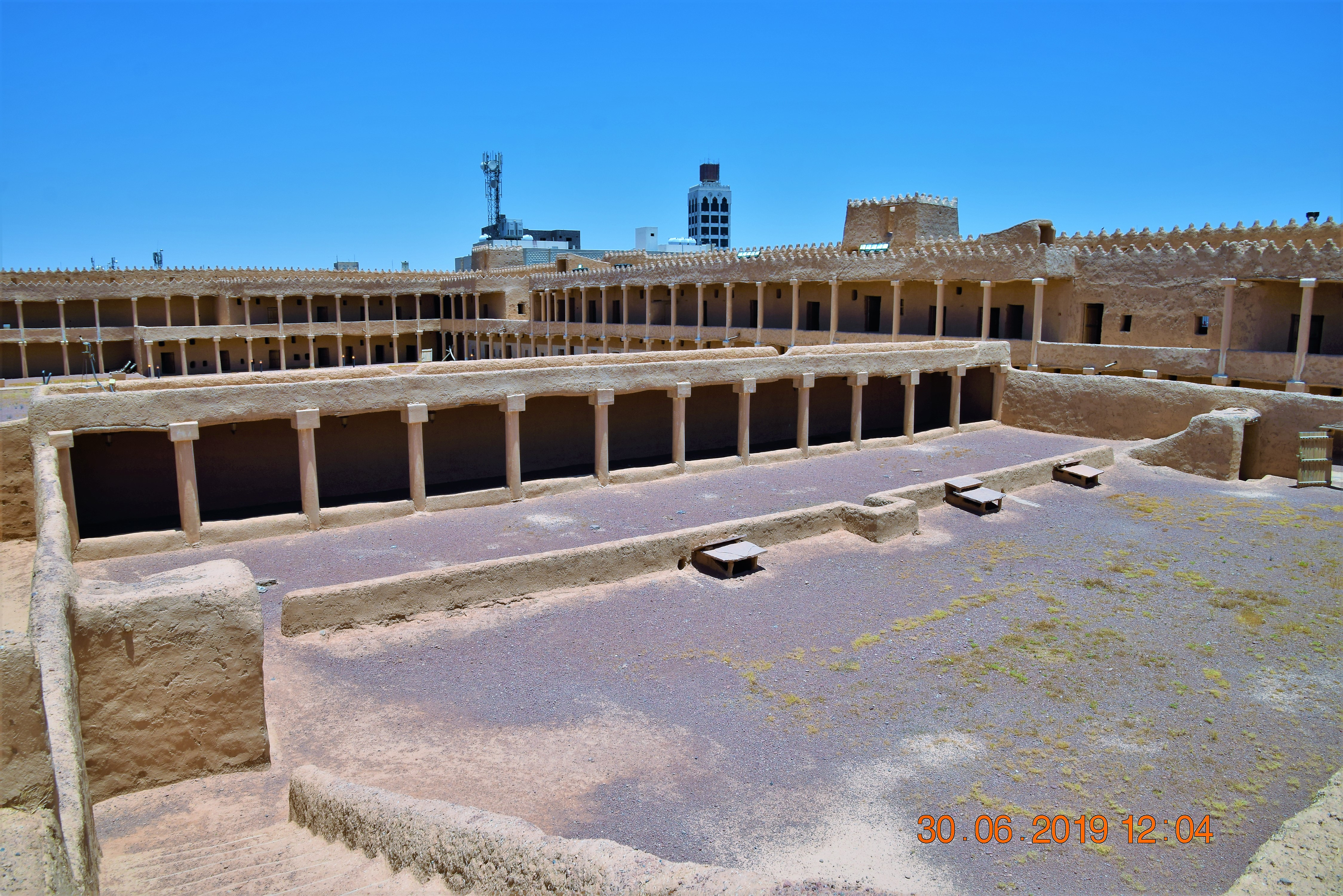
The central courtyard

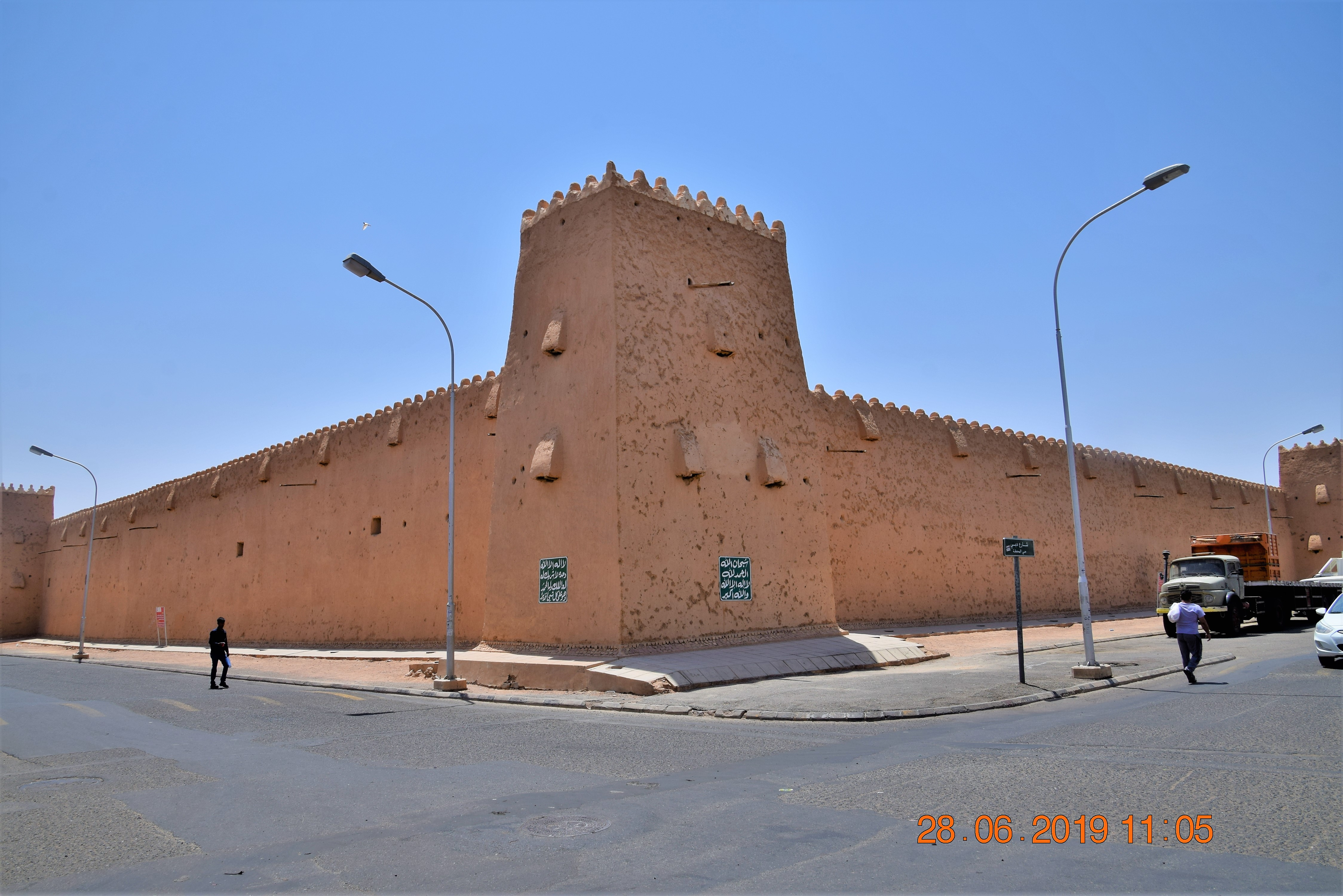
Exterior view of the palace

== See also ==
- List of castles in Saudi Arabia

== Notes ==
- Ishteeaque, Ellahi M. (2008). The Native Architecture of Saudi Arabia: Architecture and Identity. Riyadh Municipality. p. 228. ISBN 978-603-8014-02-8.
