= Abdulaziz bin Mutaib Al Rashid =

Emir of Jabal Shammar (r. 1897–1906)

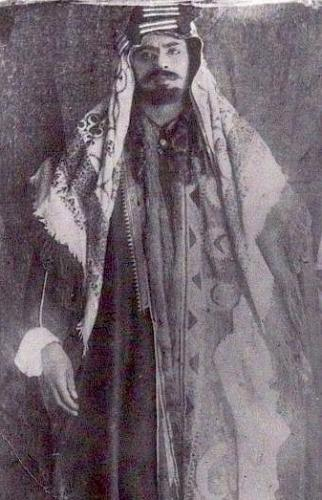
- Abdulaziz c. 1897–1906

Emir of Jabal Shammar
- Reign: 1897 – 12 April 1906
- Predecessor: Muhammad bin Abdullah
- Successor: Mutaib bin Abdulaziz
- Born: 1870; Ha'il
- Died: 12 April 1906 (aged 35–36); Rawdat Muhanna
- Issue: List: Mutaib, Emir of Jabal Shammar; Prince Mishaal; Prince Mohammed; Saud, Emir of Jabal Shammar; Princess Munira; Princess Salma; Princess Jozaa
Names
- Abdulaziz bin Mutaib bin Abdullah bin Ali Al Rashid
- House: House of Rashid
- Father: Mutaib bin Abdullah, Emir of Jabal Shammar

Abdulaziz bin Mutaib Al Rashid (Arabic: عبد العزيز بن متعب الرشيد, romanized: ʿAbd al ʿAzīz bin Mitʿeb arRašīd; 1870–12 April 1906), better known as Ibn Rashid, was the Emir of Jabal Shammar from 1897 to 1906.

== Biography ==
Abdulaziz bin Mutaib was born in 1870. He was the son of the third Rashidi emir, Mutaib bin Abdullah, and was adopted by his uncle Muhammed, the fifth emir who made Abdulaziz his heir. After Muhammed died of natural causes in 1897 Abdulaziz succeeded him unopposed. However, the Rashidi rule was insecure, as their Ottoman allies were unpopular and weakening. In 1902, Ibn Saud, the founder of Saudi Arabia, returned from Kuwait with a small force and retook Riyadh. Ibn Rashid, who engaged in several battles with Ibn Saud's forces, died in 1906 in the battle of Rawdat Muhanna against Ibn Saud.

Abdulaziz bin Mutaib Al Rashid House of Rashid Born: 1870
Regnal titles
Preceded by Muhammad bin Abdullah Al Rashid	Emir of Jabal Shammar; 1897–1906	Succeeded by Mutaib bin Abdulaziz Al Rashid
