= Al Ulayyan =

Al Ulayyan are the family which ruled Buraidah, the capital of Qassim, and part of Qassim region in specific times for more than 300 years.
