= Barzan Palace =

Historical palace in Ha'il, Saudi Arabia

- قصر برزان (Arabic)
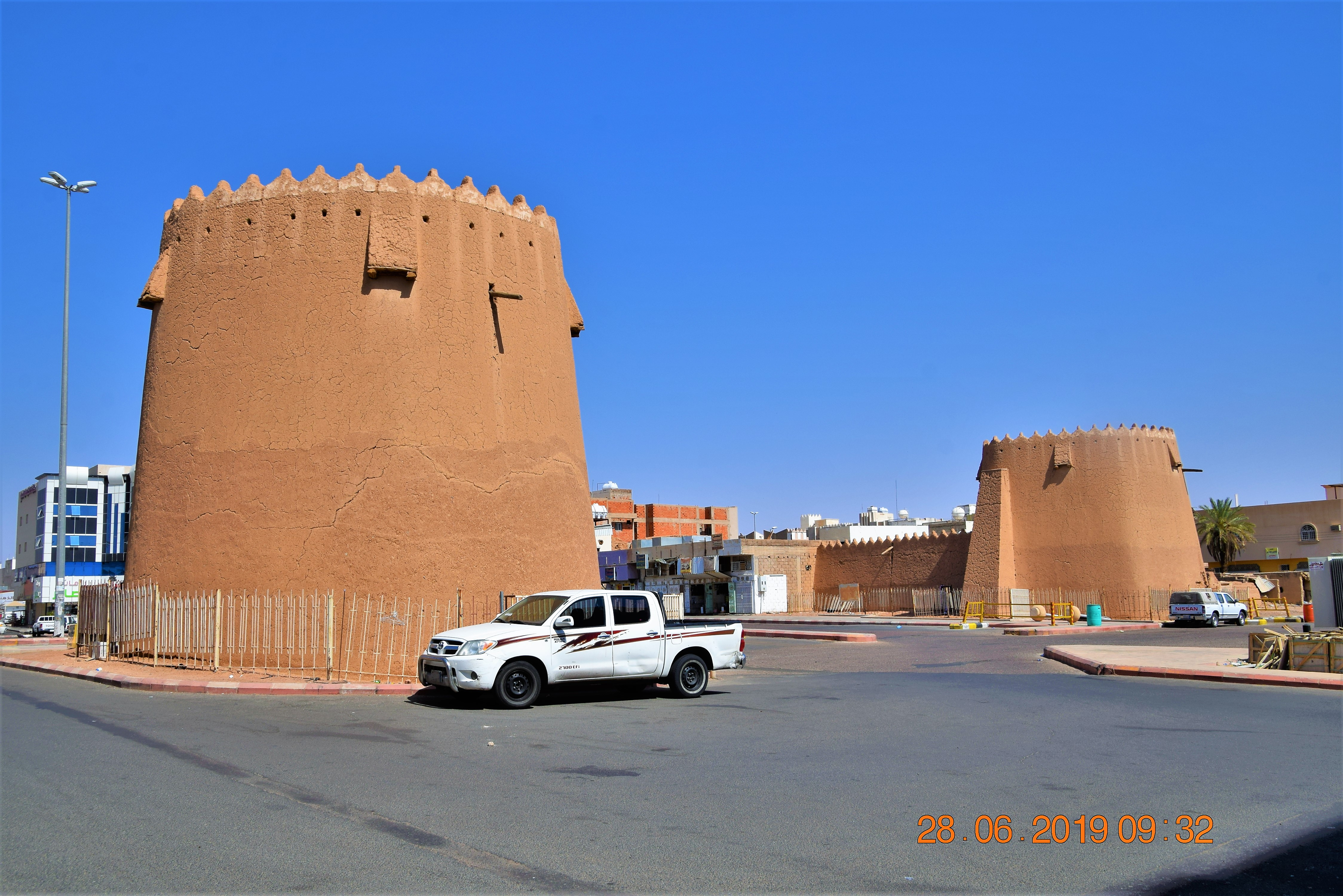
- Barzan Palace in 2019
- Interactive map of Barzan Palace
- 27.52534°N 41.70504°E
- Type: Palace
- Location: Ha'il, Saudi Arabia

History
- Built: Construction began in 1808
- Built by: Prince Muhammad bin Abdul Muhsin Al Ali

Site notes
- Height: 70 ft (21 m)
- Area: 300,000 m^{2} (3,200,000 sq ft)
- Architectural style: Traditional Najdi architecture
- Restored: 2025 (surviving towers)

Barzan (Arabic: قصر برزان) was a historical palace and fort in Ha'il, Saudi Arabia. Its construction was begun in 1808 by Prince Muhammad bin Abdul Muhsin Al Ali. The palace was completed during the rule of the second Rashidi amir, Talal bin Abdullah. The Barzan Palace, along with the A’arif fort and the Qishlah fortress, is among the three large forts in the city of Hail.

Barzan Palace stood about 70 feet (21 m) tall, consisted of three floors, and covered an area of approximately 300,000 square meters. The first floor featured the reception halls, gardens, and kitchens. The second floor housed diplomatic guests, and the third floor was occupied by the royal family. It was located near Barzan souq.

Ibn Saud of Saudi Arabia ordered the palace destroyed after he had ousted the last Al Rashid emir from power in 1921.

== Heritage and restoration ==
Barzan Palace forms part of the wider Barzan heritage area in central Ha'il, which also includes Barzan Souq, A'arif Fort, Qishlah Palace, and the traditional Barzan district.

The surviving Barzan Towers and remaining wall sections are regarded as some of Ha'il's earliest historic sites. The towers stand beside the Barzan Grand Mosque and reach approximately 12 meters (39 ft) in height. Their design reflects traditional Najdi architecture through the use of local building materials and defensive architectural elements.

In 2025, the Heritage Commission completed a restoration and rehabilitation project for the towers to preserve their architectural heritage and prepare the site to receive visitors.
