= Talal bin Abdullah Al Rashid =

Emir of Jabal Shammar (r. 1848–1868; (1823–1868))

Emir of Jabal Shammar
- Reign: 1848–1868
- Predecessor: Abdullah bin Rashid
- Successor: Mutaib bin Abdullah
- Born: 1823
- Died: 11 March 1868 (aged 44–45)
- Issue: Bandar; Badr; Nayef
Names
- Talal bin Abdullah bin Ali
- House: Rashidi dynasty
- Father: Abdullah bin Ali Al Rashid

Talal bin Abdullah Al Rashid (Arabic: طلال بن عبد الله الرشيد; 1823–11 March 1868) was the second ruler of the Emirate of Jabal Shammar. He was a skillful ruler who died by suicide. Unlike the founding ruler, Abdullah, who was titled as sheikh, the rulers of Jabal Shammar began to be referred to as emirs with the reign of Talal. In addition, Talal managed to create a state-like administration in the Emirate which had been based on the tribal alliance during the reign of Abdullah.

== Early life ==
Talal bin Abdullah was born in 1823. He was the eldest of Abdullah Al Rashid's three sons, and his brothers were Mutaib and Mohammad.

== Reign ==
Talal succeeded his father in 1848 without any dispute in the family. In addition, his succession was supported by the locals.

Qassim region was partially controlled by the Emirate of Jabal Shammar during his reign when the leaders of Qassimi tribes asked him to protect them from the Emirate of Nejd. The alliance between the Rashidis and the Ottoman Empire also started during Talal's reign when the route of Hajj from Iraq to Mecca was made safe for Ottomans. They also began to mention the name of the Ottoman Sultan as Caliph in Friday prayers. In addition, Emir Talal was very careful of not experiencing any conflict with the Ottomans and declared that he ruled the Emirate on behalf of the Caliph. He was very tolerant for Shia Muslims and Jews whom he allowed to reside and work in Hail although they were expected to pay large amount of taxes. He used these and other revenues to complete a palace and a fortress which his father Abdullah began to build in the Bazargan area of Hail. The Emirate of Jabal Shammar paid an annual levy to the Emirate of Nejd, and Emir Talal had good relations with Faisal bin Turki, Emir of Nejd, and then with his son and successor, Abdullah bin Faisal. In the 1860s Faisal bin Shalaan occupied Al Jouf region which had been under Talal's rule.

Talal's reign lasted until 11 March 1868 when he killed himself with a pistol. The reason for the suicide was his illness, possibly ulcer, that he thought cureless. Following his death his younger brother Mutaib bin Abdullah became the Emir of Jabal Shammar and briefly ruled the Emirate between March and July 1868.

== Personal life ==
Talal married three women from Al Rashid and one woman from Al Saud. The latter was Noura, daughter of his ally Emir Abdullah of Nejd. There is also another report arguing that he married a daughter of Faisal bin Turki, Emir Abdullah's father. Talal had seven sons, including Bandar, Badr and Nayef. The former also served as the Emir of Jabal Shammar in 1869, but soon he was killed by his uncle Muhammad bin Abdullah.

Talal bin Abdullah Al Rashid House of Rashid
Regnal titles
Preceded by Abdullah bin Ali Al Rashid	Emir of the House of Rashid; 1848–1868	Succeeded by Mutaib bin Abdullah Al Rashid
