= Emirate of Jabal Shammar =

1836–1921 state in northern Arabia

Emirate of Jabal Shammar إِمَارَة جَبَل شَمَّر (Arabic)
- 1836–1921
- Flag

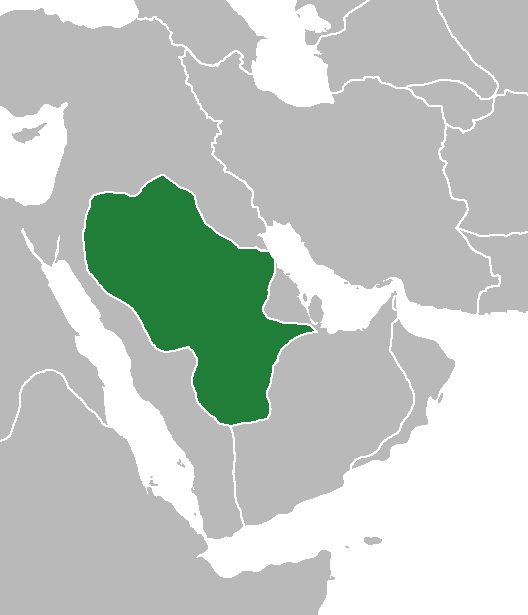
- Jabal Shammar at its greatest extent in 1891

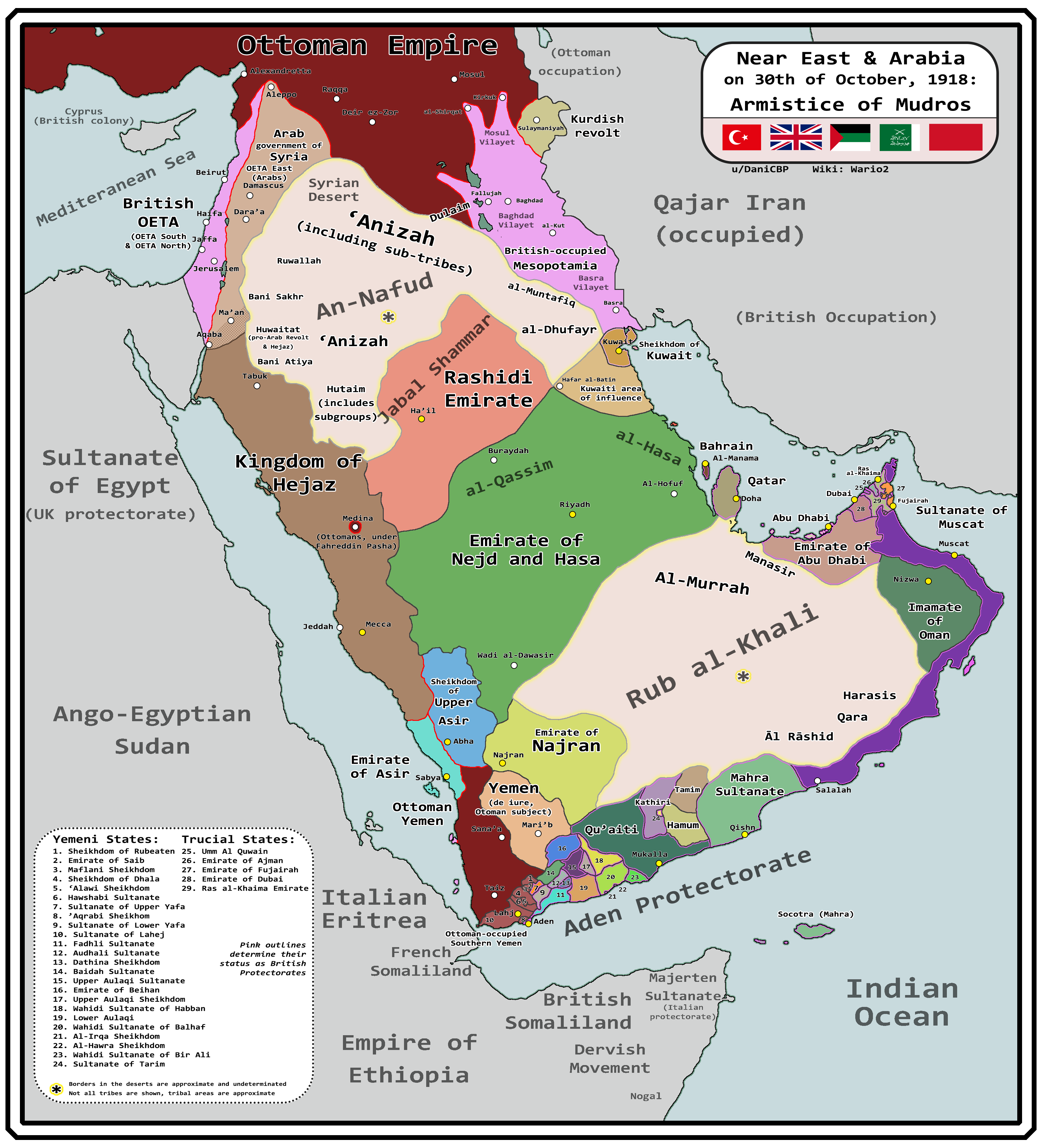
- Jabal Shammar (center, light red) at the end of World War I (1918)
- Status: Nominal vassal of the Second Saudi State (1836–1848); Sovereign kingdom (1848–1921)
- Capital: Ha'il
- Common languages: Arabic
- Religion: Sunni Islam
- Demonym: Shammari
- Government: Absolute monarchy
- Emir
  - 1836–1848 (first): Abdullah bin Rashīd
  - 1921 (last): Muhammad bin Talāl
- History
  - Abdullah bin Rashīd coup: 1836
  - Saudi conquest: 3 November 1921
Preceded by
Second Saudi state
Succeeded by
Emirate of Riyadh
Sultanate of Nejd
Kingdom of Hejaz
- Today part of: Saudi Arabia; Jordan; Iraq

The Emirate of Jabal Shammar (Arabic: إِمَارَة جَبَل شَمَّر, romanized: Imārah Jabal Shammar), also known as the Emirate of Haʾil (إِمَارَة حَائِل) or the Rashidi Emirate (إِمَارَة آل رَشِيْد), was a state in the northern part of the Arabian Peninsula, including Najd, existing from the mid-nineteenth century to 1921. Shammar had been a confederation in the Arabian Peninsula. Jabal Shammar in English is translated as the "Mountain of Shammar". Jabal Shammar's capital was Ha'il. It was led by the monarchy of the Rashidi dynasty. It included parts of modern-day Saudi Arabia, Iraq, and Jordan.

== History ==
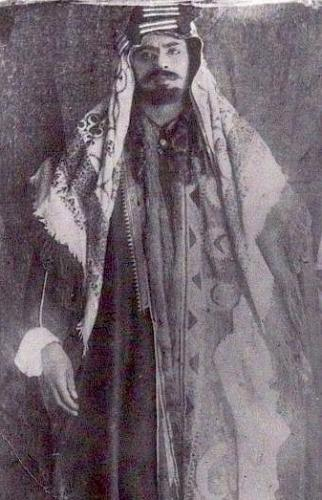
A photograph of Abdul Aziz bin Mutʿib, nicknamed "Al-Janāzah", the sixth Amir of Jabal Shammar.

The Emirate of Jabal Shammar was established in 1836 as a vassal of the second Saudi state when the first ruler of the emirate Abdullah bin Rashid was appointed as governor of Ha’il by the Saudi Imam Faisal bin Turki. However after the weakening of the second Saudi state, the Rashīdis, rulers of Jabal Shammar, had succeeded in ousting their Saudi overlords from Riyadh in 1891 following the Battle of Mulayda. This resulted in the abolition of the Second Saudi State, the Emirate of Nejd, and incorporation of its territory into Jabal Shammar. As the Saudis were out of the picture, exiled in Kuwait, the House of Rashīd sought friendly ties with the Ottoman Empire to its north. This alliance became less and less profitable during the course of the 19th century as the Ottomans lost influence and legitimacy. The Emirate’s capital, Ha’il, served as an important stopping point for persons traveling between the cities of Mecca and Medina and the towns and cities of Iraq and Iran.

In 1902, Abdulaziz ibn Saud succeeded in recapturing Riyadh for the House of Saud, and began a campaign to reconquer the region – a campaign which turned out to be highly successful for the Saudis. After several clashes, the Rashīdis and Saudis engaged into a full scale war over the region of Qassim, which resulted in a painful defeat for the Rashīdis and the death of the Rashīdi emir Abdul Aziz ibn Mitaab Al Rashīd.

Following the death of the Emir, Jabal Shammar gradually went into decline, being further pressed with the demise of its Ottoman ally in World War I. Ibn Saud, allied with the British Empire as a counterweight to the Ottomans' support for Jabal Shammar, emerged far stronger from the First World War. The Emirate of Jabal Shammar was finally terminated with the Saudi campaign of late 1921. The Emirate surrendered to the Saudis on November 2, 1921, and was subsequently incorporated into the Sultanate of Nejd.

== Emirs ==
1. ʿAbdullah (I) bin Rashīd (Arabic: عبدالله بن رشيد; 1836–48). Abdullah bin Rashid came to power after leading a revolt (together with his brother prince ʿUbayd Al Rashīd) against the ruler of Ha'il, Muhammad bin Ali, who was a fellow member of the Jaafar al-Shammari lineage. As a leader, Abdullah was praised for bringing peace and stability both to Ha'il and to the surrounding region. Abdullah demanded from his brother prince ʿUbayd an ahd (covenant), according to which succession to the office of amir would remain in Abdullah's line.
2. Ṭalāl bin ʿAbdullah (طلال بن عبدالله; 1848–68). The son of Abdullah, Talal is remembered for his relative liberalism and interest in building projects. During his rule, the Barzan Palace in Ha'il was completed. He established regular trade connections with Iraq and expanded the Rashīdi sphere of influence:
  "The inhabitants of Kaseem, weary of Wahhabee tyranny, turned their eyes towards Telal, who had already given a generous and inviolable asylum to the numerous political exiles of that district. Secret negotiations took place, and at a favourable moment the entire uplands of that province—after a fashion not indeed peculiar to Arabia—annexed themselves to the kingdom of Shammar by universal and unanimous suffrage." (William Gifford Palgrave, 1865: 129.)
  Talal was considered relatively tolerant towards foreigners, including traders in Ha'il:
  "Many of these traders belonged to the Shia sect, hated by some Sunni, doubly hated by the Wahabees. But Telal [sic] affected not to perceive their religious discrepansies, and silenced all murmurs by marks of special favour towards these very dissenters, and also by the advantages which their presence was not long in procuring for the town". (William Gifford Palgrave 1865: 130.)
  In the 1860s, internal disputes in the House of Saud allowed a Rashīd/Ottoman alliance to oust them. The Rashīd occupied the Saudi capital of Riyadh in 1865 and forced the leaders of the House of Saud into exile. Talal later died in a shooting incident which has been termed "mysterious". Charles Doughty, in his book Travels in Arabia Deserta, writes that Talal committed suicide. Talal left seven sons, but the oldest, Bandar, was only 18 or 20 when his father died.
3. Mutʿib (I) bin ʿAbdullah (متعب بن عبدالله; 1868–69). A younger brother of Talal, he was supported by senior members of the Rashīd family and the sheikhs of the Shammar sections. After only a year, he was shot and killed in the Barzan Palace by his nephew and next amir, Bandar. Doughty's version of the events is that Bandar and Badr, the second-oldest son, cast a silver bullet to kill their uncle because they knew he wore an amulet that protected him against lead.
4. Bandar bin Talal (بندر بن طلال; 1869). Ruled for only a short time before he was killed by his uncle, Muḥammad. Bandar reportedly married his uncle's widow and had a son by her.
5. Muḥammad bin ʿAbdullah; 1869–97). A confrontation outside Ha'il with his nephew, the young Amir Bandar, ended with Muhammed killing Bandar. Muhammed then continued his journey to Ha'il and announced himself as the new amir. In order to prevent the possibility of revenge, Muhammed gave orders for the execution of all of Bandar's brothers (the sons of Talal), Bandar's cousins (the children of Talal's sister), and their slaves and servants. Only one of Talal's sons, Naif, survived. In spite of the inauspicious beginning, his rule turned out to be the longest in the history of the Rashīdi dynasty. His rule became "a period of stability, expansion and prosperity" (ref.: p. 61, Al Rashīd). His expansion reached al-Jawf and Palmyra to the north and Tayma and Khaybar to the west. In 1891, after a rebellion, ʿAbd al-Rahman bin Faysal bin Turki Al Saud left Riyadh. The Saudi family, including the ten-year-old Abdul Aziz Al-Saud, went into exile in Kuwait.
6. ʿAbdulazīz bin Mutaib (عبدالعزيز بن متعب; 1897–1906). A son of Mutʿib, the third amir, he was adopted by his uncle Muhammad, the fifth amir, and brought up to be his heir. After Muhammad died of natural causes, Abd al-ʿAziz succeeded him unopposed. However Rashīd rule was insecure as their Ottoman allies were unpopular and weakening. In 1904, the young Ibn Saud, the future founder of Saudi Arabia, returned from exile with a small force and retook Riyadh. Abd al-ʿAziz died in the battle of Rawdat Muhanna with Ibn Saud in 1906.
7. Mutaib (II) bin ʿAbdulazīz (متعب بن عبدالعزيز; 1906). Succeeded his father as amir. However, he was not able to win support of the whole family and, within a year, he was killed by Sultan bin Hammud.
8. Sultān bin Ḥammūd (سلطان بن حمود; 1906–08). A grandson of Ubayd (the brother of the first amir), he was criticized because he ignored the ahd (covenant) between his grandfather and the first amir. He was unsuccessful in fighting Ibn Saud, and was killed by his own brothers.
9. Saud bin Hamoud (سعود بن حمود; 1908). Another grandson of Ubayd. Saʿud was killed by the maternal relatives of Saʿud bin ʿAbd al-ʿAziz, the tenth amir.
10. Saud bin Abdulaziz (سعود بن عبدالعزيز; 1908–20). A boy of 10 when he was made amir, his maternal relatives of the Al Sabhan family ruled as regents on his behalf until he came of age, based on the constitution of Emara. In 1920, he was assassinated by his cousin, Abdullah bin Talal (a brother of the 12th amir). Two of his widows remarried: Norah bint Hammud Al Sabhan became Ibn Saud's eighth wife and Fahda bint Asi Al Shuraim of the Abde section of the Shammar tribe became Ibn Saud's ninth wife and the mother of King Abdullah of Saudi Arabia.
11. ʿAbdullah (II) bin Mutʿib (عبدالله بن متعب; 1920–21; died 1947). A son of the 7th amir, he surrendered to Ibn Saud in 1921, after having come to the throne the year before, at the age of thirteen.
12. Muhammad (II) bin Talāl (محمد بن طلال; 1921; died 1954). A grandson of Naif, the only surviving son of Talal, the 2nd Amir. Muhammad bin Talal's wife Nura bint Sibban married King Abdulaziz after he was imprisoned by him. Surrendered to Ibn Saud. One of the daughters of Muhammad bin Talal, Watfa, married Prince Musa'id bin Abdulaziz Al Saud, the fifteenth son of Ibn Saud. Prince Musa'id and Watfa became the parents of Prince Faisal bin Musa'id, the assassin of King Faisal.

== Economy ==
The Emirate had a mixed economy of pastoral nomadism, oasis agriculture, urban crafts, and trade. Historically, the Emirate produced alfalfa.

== See also ==
- Battle of Jabal Shammar (1929)
- List of Sunni Muslim dynasties
