= Abdullah bin Ali Al Rashid =

Founder and Emir of Jabal Shammar (r. 1836–1848) (1788–1848)

Emir of Jabal Shammar
- Reign: 1836–1848
- Predecessor: Office established
- Successor: Talal bin Abdullah Al Rashid
- Born: 1788
- Died: April 1848 (aged 59–60)
- Issue: List: Emir Talal bin Abdullah; Emir Mutaib bin Abdullah; Emir Muhammad bin Abdullah
- Abdullah bin Ali bin Rashid
- House: Rashidi dynasty

Abdullah bin Ali Al Rashid (Arabic: عبد الله بن علي الرشيد; 1788–1848) was the founder of the Emirate of Jabal Shammar. He founded the Emirate in 1836 and ruled it until 1848. He was called Sheikh due to his noble lineage and military ability.

== Biography ==
Abdullah was the eldest son of Ali Al Rashid. The family were from the Jafar clan of the Abdih section of the Shammar tribe. He had a younger brother, Ubayd, with whom he founded the Emirate. They were both major Nabati poets.

Abdullah was very influential in Ha'il which caused him to be forced out of the region by Mohammed bin Ali, his cousin and ruler of the region. Another reason for his exile was his challenging the rule of Muhammad bin Ali. Therefore, he left Ha'il and settled in Riyadh where he became a companion of Faisal bin Turki Al Saud, the ruler of the Second Saudi State. Abdullah supported Faisal against the latter's cousin Mishari bin Abdul Rahman. In fact, it was Abdullah bin Ali who murdered Mishari in 1834.

Faisal bin Turki named Abdullah bin Ali as governor of Ha'il the same year. Then he became the sole ruler of the region after he defeated his cousin. Abdullah bin Rashid announced his loyalty to Faisal bin Turki, Emir of Najd, and permitted a Wahhabi qadi to settle in Hail. However, when Faisal bin Turki was arrested and sent by the Egyptian forces led by Mohammad Ali Pasha to exile in Cairo, Abdullah bin Rashid declared his independence from Al Saud in 1836.

During his cooperation with Faisal bin Turki he married one of his daughters, Al Jawhara. Under Abdullah Al Rashid's leadership, the Rashidi dynasty contended with the Second Saudi State in Najd and the Ottoman Empire in Iraq. He was succeeded by his son, Talal, in 1848. He had two other sons, Mutaib and Mohammed.

His state fell to the Saudis in 1921.

Abdullah bin Ali Al Rashid House of Rashid
Regnal titles
Preceded by Office established	Emir of the House of Rashid; 1836–1847	Succeeded by Talal bin Abdullah Al Rashid
