= Rashidi dynasty =

Arabian Muslim dynasty (1836–1921)

House of Rashid
- Flag of Rashidi Dynasty
- Parent house: Jaafar al-Shammari branch of Shammar
- Country: Emirate of Jabal Shammar
- Founded: 1836
- Founder: Abdullah bin Ali Al Rashid
- Final ruler: Muhammad bin Talāl
- Titles: Emir of Jabal Shammar
- Estate: Jabal Shammar
- Dissolution: 1921

The Rashidi dynasty, also called Al Rashid or the House of Rashid (Arabic: آل رشيد Āl Rashīd; pronounced [ʔæːl raˈʃiːd]), was a historic Arabian House or dynasty that existed in the Arabian Peninsula between 1836 and 1921. Its members were rulers of the Emirate of Ha'il and the most formidable enemies of the House of Saud, rulers of the Emirate of Nejd. They were centered in Ha'il, a city in northern Najd that derived its wealth from being on the route of the Hajj pilgrimage to Mecca, and was also a commercial center. The rulers of Ha'il were the sons of Abdullah bin Rashid, founder of the dynasty.

== History ==
The Rashidi dynasty derived their name from their forebear Abdullah bin Ali Al Rashid, the first emir, who began the establishment of the Emirate of Ha'il. The Rashidi emirs co-operated closely with the Ottoman Empire. However, that co-operation became problematic as the Ottoman Empire lost popularity.

In 1890, Al Rashid occupied Riyadh and then defeated the Saudi tribes, who fled into exile, first to Bahrain, then to Qatar, and finally to Kuwait.

As with many other Arab ruling dynasties, the lack of an accepted rule of succession was a recurrent problem for the Rashidi. The internal dispute normally centered on whether succession to the position of emir should be horizontal (to a brother) or vertical (to a son) and often were resolved violently. Six Rashidi leaders died violently in the last years of the nineteenth century. Nevertheless, the Rashidi still ruled and fought together during the Saudi–Rashidi Wars.

During the first two decades of the 20th century, the Arabian Peninsula saw a long-running series of wars as the Saudis and their allies sought to unite the peninsula under their rule. By 1921, Ha'il was captured by Abdulaziz Al Saud.

Some members of the Rashid family left the country and went into voluntary exile, mostly to the Kingdom of Iraq, Pakistan, Oman, Kuwait, and the UAE. By the 1990s, only a handful were still inside Saudi Arabia.

== Emirs of the House of Rashid ==
1. ʿAbdullah bin Ali Al Rashid (Arabic: عبدالله بن رشيد), (1836–48). Abdullah came to power after he got the support from Imam Faisal bin Turki bin Abdullah Al Saud to be assigned officially and takeover the Emirate of Hail instead of the current Emir, Muhammad bin Ali al-Jaafar al-Shammari. Abdullah bin Rashid came to the picture after leading a revolt (together with his brother prince ʿUbayd Al Rashīd) against the ruler of Ha'il, Muhammad bin Ali, who was a fellow member of the Jaafar al-Shammari lineage. As a leader, Abdullah was praised for bringing peace and stability both to Ha'il and to the surrounding region. Abdullah demanded from his brother prince ʿUbayd an ahd (covenant) according to which succession to the office of emir would remain in Abdullah's line. Where it was supported by their cousin and close friend Zamil Bin Sabhan from Al Sabhan Family who supported both brothers for the succession.
2. Talāl bin ʿAbdullah (Arabic: طلال بن عبدالله), (1848–68). The son of Abdullah. Talal is remembered for his relative liberalism and interest in building projects. During his rule, the Barzan Palace in Ha'il was completed. He established regular trade connections with Iraq, and expanded the Rashidi sphere of influence:
  "The inhabitants of Kaseem, weary of Wahhabee tyranny, turned their eyes towards Telal, who had already given a generous and inviolable asylum to the numerous political exiles of that district. Secret negotiations took place, and at a favourable moment the entire uplands of that province—after a fashion not indeed peculiar to Arabia—annexed themselves to the kingdom of Shommer by universal and unanimous suffrage." (William Gifford Palgrave, 1865: 129.)
  Talal was considered relatively tolerant towards foreigners, including traders in Ha'il:
  "Many of these traders belonged to the Shia sect, hated by some Sunni, doubly hated by the Wahabees. But Telal [sic] affected not to perceive their religious discrepansies, and silenced all murmurs by marks of special favour towards these very dissenters, and also by the advantages which their presence was not long in procuring for the town". (William Gifford Palgrave 1865: 130.)
  In the 1860s, internal disputes in the House of Saud allowed a Rashidi/Ottoman alliance to oust them. The Rashidi occupied the Saudi capital of Riyadh in 1865 and forced the leaders of the House of Saud into exile. Talal later died in a shooting incident which has been termed "mysterious". Charles Doughty, in his book Travels in Arabia Deserta, writes that Talal committed suicide. Talal left seven sons, but the oldest, Bandar, was only 18 or 20 when his father died.
3. Mutaib bin Abdullah (Arabic: متعب بن عبدالله), (1868–9). A younger brother of Talal, he was supported by senior members of the Rashid family and the sheikhs of the Shammar sections. After less than two years of reign, he was shot and killed in the Barzan Palace by his nephew and next emir, Bandar. Doughty's version of the events is that Bandar and Badr, the second-oldest son, cast a silver bullet to kill their uncle because they knew he wore an amulet that protected him against lead. Henry Rosenfeld also stated that Mutaib bin ʿAbdullah was killed by Bandar and Badr.
4. Bandar bin Talal (Arabic: بندر بن طلال), (1869). Ruled for only a short time before he was killed by his uncle, Muhammed, the brother of Mutaib. Bandar reportedly married his uncle's widow and had a son by her.
5. Muhammed bin ʿAbdullah (Arabic: محمد بن عبدالله); (1869-1897) A confrontation outside Ha'il with his nephew, the young emir Bandar, ended with Muhammed killing Bandar. Muhammed then continued his journey to Ha'il and announced himself as the new emir. In order to prevent the possibility of revenge, Muhammed gave orders for the execution of all of Bandar's brothers (the sons of Talal), Bandar's cousins (the children of Talal's sister), and their slaves and servants. Only one of Talal's sons, Naif, survived. Additionally he eliminated the threat around him from "his uncle" Ubaid and his sons, while he relied on the far cousins Al Sabhan family who identified as supporter for his father before himself. In spite of the inauspicious beginning, his rule turned out to be the longest in the history of the Rashidi dynasty. His rule became "a period of stability, expansion and prosperity" His expansion reached al-Jawf and Palmyra to the north, and Tayma and Khaybar to the west. In 1891, after a rebellion, ʿAbdul Rahman bin Faisal Al Saud left Riyadh. The Saud family, including the ten-year-old Ibn Saud, went into exile in Kuwait.
6. ʿAbdulazīz bin Mutaib (Arabic: عبدالعزيز بن متعب), (1897–1906). A son of Mutʿib, the third emir, he was adopted by his uncle Muhammed, the fifth emir, and brought up to be his heir. After Muhammed died of natural causes, Abd al-ʿAziz succeeded him unopposed. However Rashidi rule was insecure as their Ottoman allies were unpopular and weakening. In 1904, the young Ibn Saud, the future founder of Saudi Arabia, returned from exile with a small force and retook Riyadh. Abd al ʿAziz died in the battle of Rawdat Muhanna with ibn Saud in 1906.
7. Mutʿib bin ʿAbd al ʿAzīz (Arabic: متعب بن عبدالعزيز), (1906–07). Succeeded his father as emir. However, he was not able to win support of the whole family, and, within a year, he was killed by Sultan bin Hammud.
8. Sultān bin Hammūd (Arabic: سلطان بن حمود), (1907–08). A grandson of Ubayd (the brother of the first emir), he was criticized because he ignored the ahd (covenant) between his grandfather and the first emir. He was unsuccessful in fighting Ibn Saud, and was killed by his own brothers.
9. Saʿūd bin Hammūd (Arabic: سعود بن حمود), (1908–10). Another grandson of Ubayd. Saʿud was killed by the maternal relatives of Saʿud bin ʿAbd al-ʿAziz, the 10th emir.
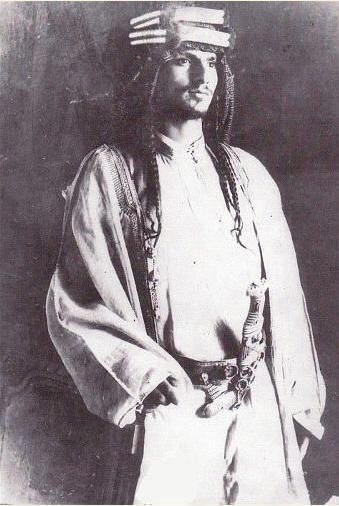
  Saud bin Abdul Aziz Rashid
10. Saud bin Abdulaziz (Arabic: سعود بن عبدالعزيز), (1910–20). A boy of 10 when he was made emir, his maternal relatives of the Al Sabhan family ruled as regents on his behalf until he came of age, based on the constitution of Emara. In 1920, he was assassinated by his cousin, Abdullah bin Talal (a brother of the 12th emir). Two of his widows remarried: Norah bint Hammud Al Sabhan became Ibn Saud's eight wife, and Fahda bint Asi bin Shuraim Al Shammari of the Abde section of the Shammar tribe became Ibn Saud's ninth wife and the mother of King Abdullah of Saudi Arabia.
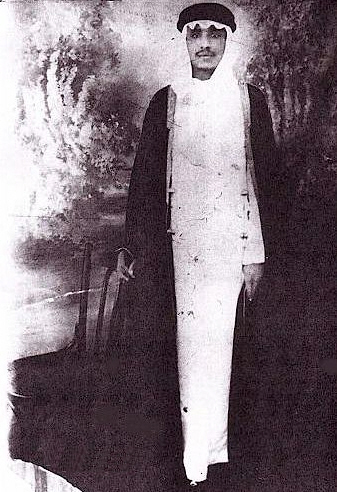
  Abdullah bin Mutʿib
11. ʿAbdullah bin Mutʿib (Arabic: عبدالله بن متعب), (1920–21). A son of the 7th emir, he surrendered to Ibn Saud, he was 20 years old. Despite that, he was one of the key factor of Hail Emara deterioration.
12. Muhammad bin Talāl (Arabic: محمد بن طلال), (1921). A grandson of Naif, the only surviving son of Talal, the second emir. Muhammad bin Talal's wife Nura bint Sabhan from the Al Sabhan family married to King Abdulaziz after he was imprisoned by him. Surrendered to Ibn Saud. One of the daughters of Muhammad bin Talal, Watfa, married Prince Musa'id bin Abdulaziz Al Saud, the twelfth son of Ibn Saud. Prince Musa'id and Watfa became the parents of Prince Faisal bin Musa'id, the assassin of King Faisal.

There has been a tendency to attribute the development of the House of Rashid to trading and commercial expansion, but documents have come to light which emphasise the significance of external pressures and the Rashidi's interaction with foreign governments and leaders, but Al Sauds are equally said of the same thing which catapulted them to power.

== See also ==
- List of Sunni Muslim dynasties
- Unification of Saudi Arabia
