= Hail (city) =

Seat of Hail Province, Saudi Arabia

Hail حائل
- City
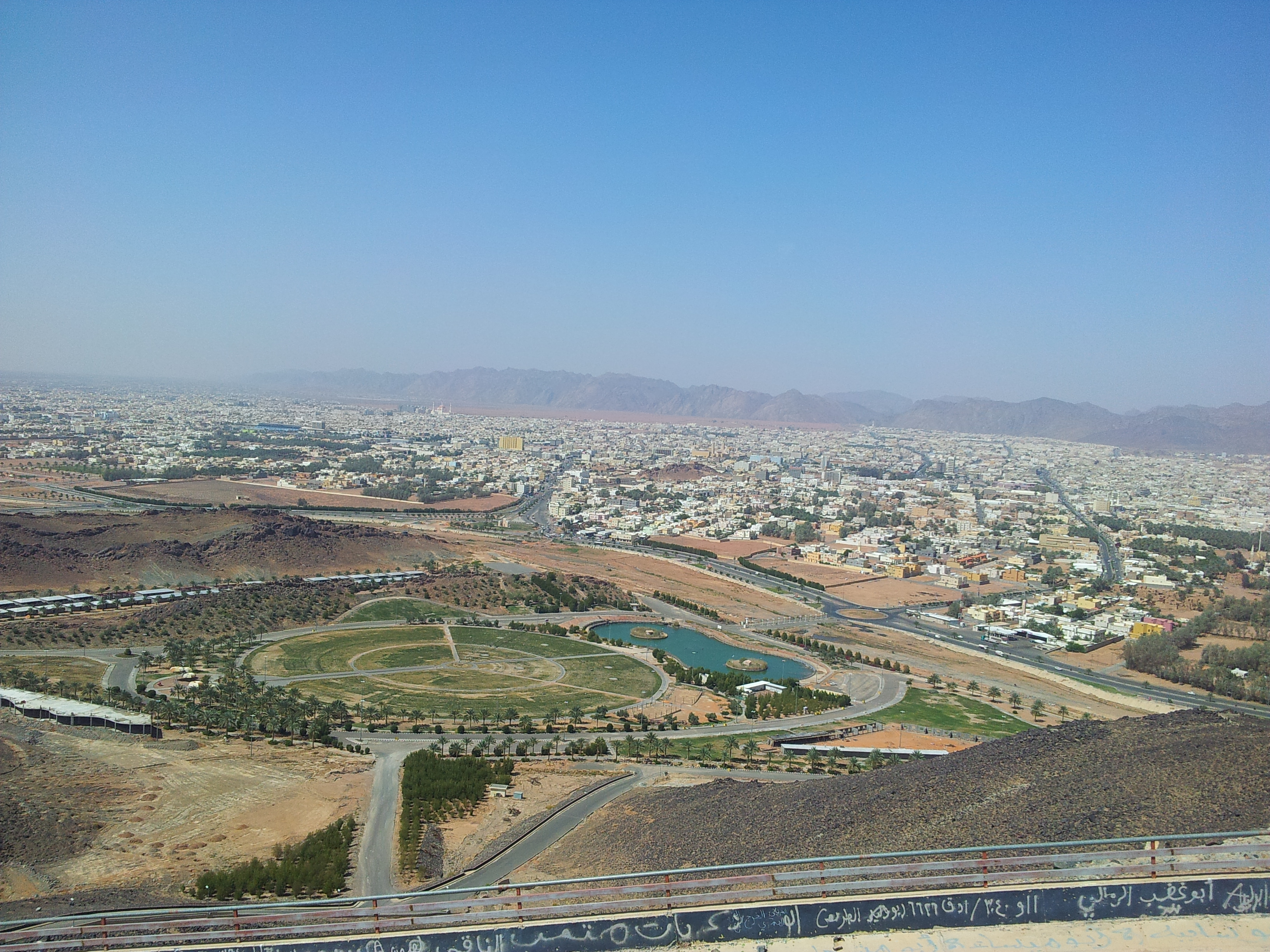
- A view of the city from the top of Samra Mountain
- Nickname: The Bride Of The North
- Location of Hail within Hail Province

- Location of Hail within Saudi Arabia
- Coordinates: 27°31′00″N 41°41′00″E
- Country: Saudi Arabia
- Province: Hail Province
- Region: Najd

Government
  - Type: Development Authority / Municipality
  - Body: Hail Development Authority (Upper body); Hail Municipality (Lower body)
- Highest elevation (Mount Aja): 1,550 m (5,090 ft)

Population (2022 census)
  - City: 448,623
  - Metro: 498,575 (administrative center)
- Time zone: UTC+03:00 (SAST)
- Area code: 016
- Website: www.hail.gov.sa

Hail (Arabic: حائل, Ḥāʾil) is a city in north-western Saudi Arabia, located between the Shammar Mountains of Aja and Salma. It is the seat and largest city of Hail Province. As of 2022, Hail has a population of 498,575.

Hail is largely agricultural, with significant grain, date, and fruit production. A large percentage of the kingdom's wheat production comes from Hail Province, where the area to the northeast, 60 to 100 km (37 to 62 miles) away, consists of irrigated gardens. Historically, Hail derived its wealth from being on the camel caravan route of the Hajj. Hail is well known for the generosity of its people throughout Saudi Arabia and the Arab world as it is the place where Hatim al-Tai lived. It is also the homeland of the Rashidi dynasty, historical rivals to the House of Saud.

== History ==
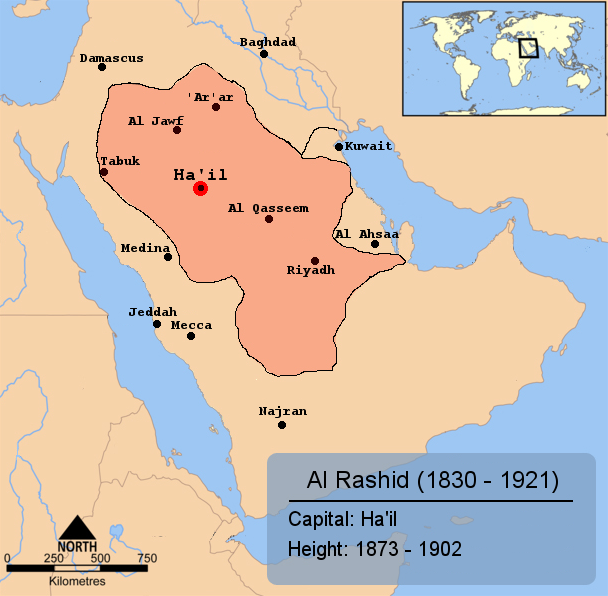
The extent of the Rashidi dynasty rule

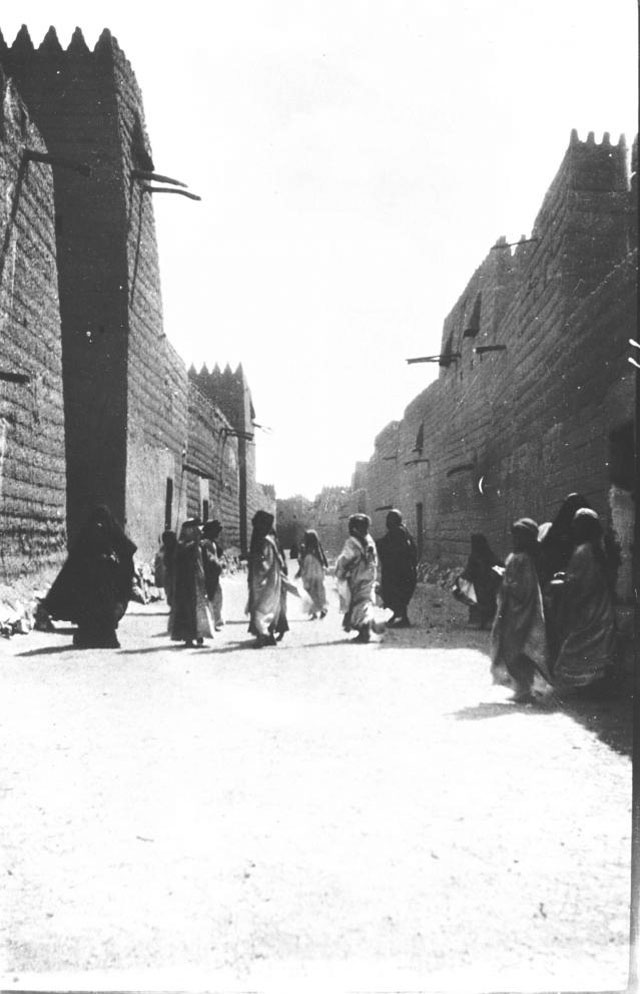
A street in Hail, 1914

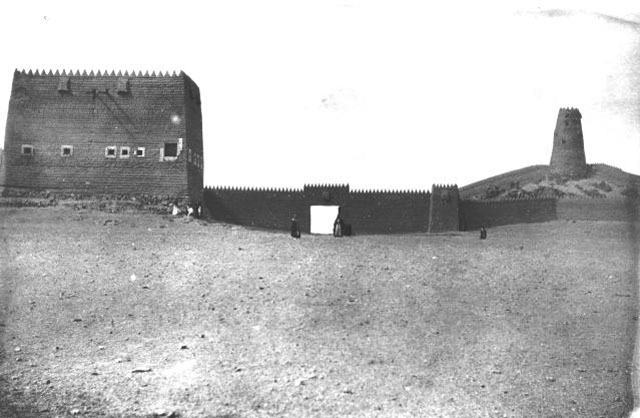
Gates of the city in the early 20th century

The city of Hail was the capital of the Emirate of Jabal Shammar from 1836 until the Saudi conquest of the emirate in 1921. The emirate was ruled by the Rashidi dynasty and was supported by the Ottoman Empire.

The first emir, Abdullah bin Ali, took power with his brother Emir Obaid and Jabbr's sons. He continued constructing the Barzan Palace in Hail, which had been started by Muhammad bin Abdul Muhsin of the Emirate of Al Ali, the predecessor state that ruled Hail between 1489 and 1834. After Abdullah bin Ali's death in 1848, his son and successor, Talal bin Abdullah, completed the palace.

Flag of the Emirate of Jabal Shammar, ruled by the Rashidi dynasty (1836–1921)

During the Rashidi period many foreign travellers visited Hail and the Rashidi emirs, and described their impressions in different journals and books, including those of Georg August Wallin (1845), Gifford Palgrave (1865), Lady Anne Blunt (1881), Charles Montagu Doughty (1888), and Gertrude Bell (1914). Rashidi emirs were considered relatively tolerant towards foreigners, including traders in Hail:

"Many of these traders belonged to the Shiyaa sect, hated by some Sonnites, doubly hated by the Wahabees. But Telal affected not to perceive their religious discrepancies, and silenced all murmurs by marks of special favor towards these very dissenters, and also by the advantages which their presence was not long in procuring for the town."

The construction of the Hejaz railway between Damascus and Medina, together with new inexpensive steamship routes to Jeddah, undermined the traditional camel caravan economy of Hail.

The last Rashidi emir was ousted from power by Ibn Saud in 1921. Ibn Saud then gave orders to destroy the Barzan Palace and also ordered the leaders of the Rashidi dynasty and Al Sabhan dynasty to move from Hail to Riyadh, and he assigned one person from the mentioned families, as temporary emir Prince Ibraheem bin Salem Al Sabhan in order to assure the loyalty from the Hail people and Shammar. After this, Hail fell into steep decline, as witnessed by E. Rutter in 1931:

"Hail seems like a city marooned among the sand...the population of Hail was plainly in decline. Numbers of houses in the northern quarter of the town were in ruins...many people of Hail had fled to the comfortable realms of King Faisal of Iraq."

.

== Notable people ==
- Hatim al-Tai was a famous Arabian poet who lived before Muhammad's preaching of Islam, and the father of the latter's companion Adi ibn Hatim and Safana bint Hatim. He was a Christian, and belonged to the Tayy Arabian tribe. Stories about his extreme generosity have made him an icon to Arabs up till the present day, as in the proverbial phrase "more generous than Hatim". There is a hill overlooking the city of Hail which has a reproduction of the campfire he lit to welcome his guests, which is turned on every night and can be seen from the center of the town. He was the ruler of his tribe. After Hatim's death, his son Adi became the ruler of Tayy. He also became a Muslim in 628 after a meeting with Muhammad.
- Abdulaziz bin Mutaib Al Rashid was the son of the third emir of the Rashidi dynasty. He was adopted by his uncle, Mohammed, the fifth emir, and was brought up as his heir. After Mohammed died of natural causes, Abdulaziz succeeded him without opposition. However, Rashidi rule was insecure, as their Ottoman allies were increasingly unpopular and weakening. In 1902, the young Ibn Saud, the founder of the Third Saudi state, returned from exile with a small force and retook Riyadh. Abdulaziz died in the battle of Rawdat Muhanna while fighting against the House of Saud.

== Geography ==
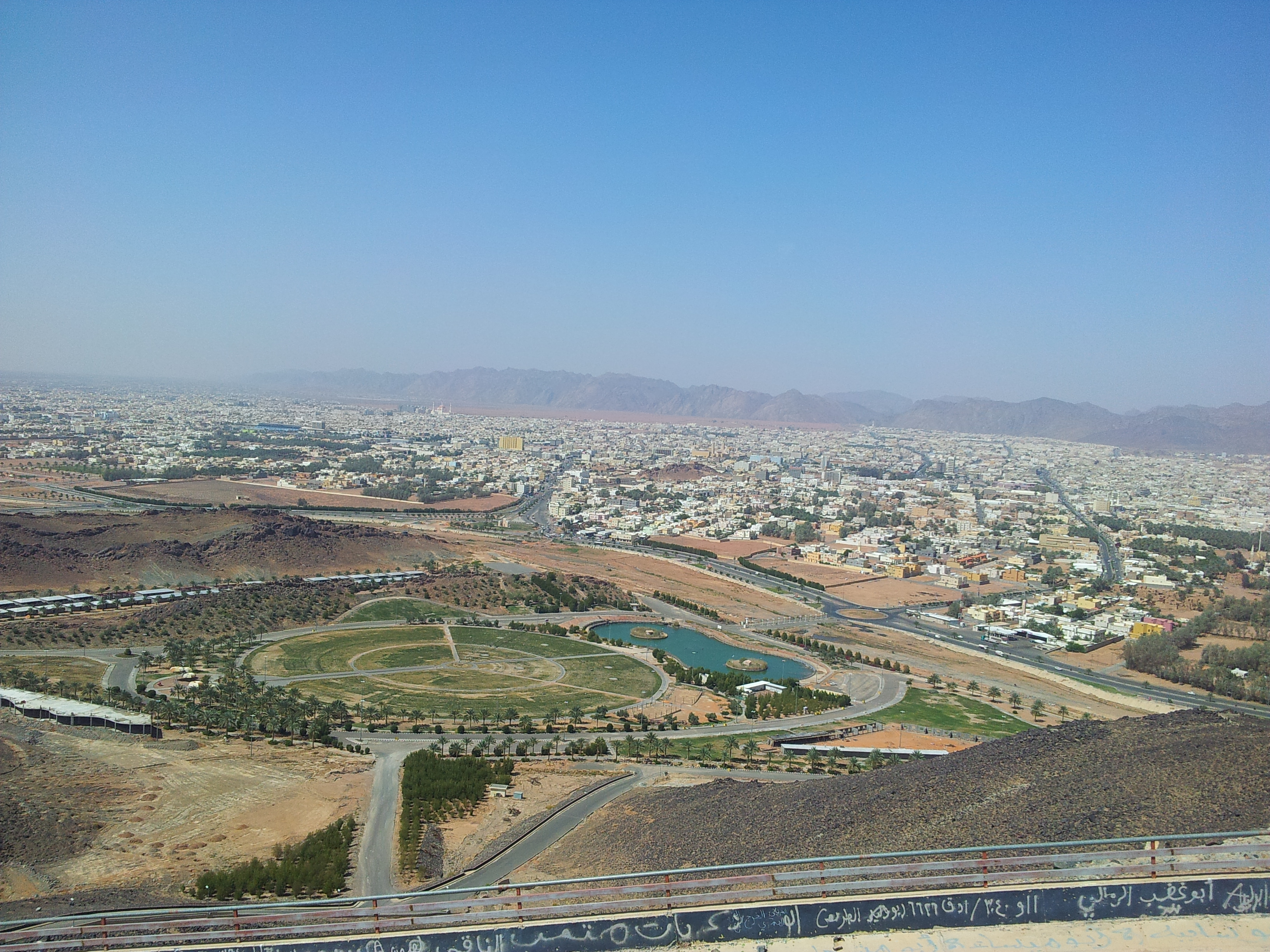
A view of the city from the top of Samra Mountain

- Samra Mountain overlooks the city. This is where Hatim al-Tai lit a fire on the summit to welcome guests. Today an asphalt road leads to the summit where a natural gas-powered fire is lit at night. There is a park with a lake at the bottom of the mountain, and on the side of the mountain is the Emblem of Saudi Arabia (date palm and crossed swords) made from electric lights which are turned on at night.

- Aja Mountain (Jabal Aja) is on the opposite side of Hail city from As-Samra. A huge Saudi flag made of electric lights, turned on at night, is located on the side of the mountain.
- The Adayra Valley runs roughly along a north–south axis, dividing central Ha'il in two.

=== Climate ===
Hail has a hot desert climate (Köppen climate classification BWh) with hot summers and cool winters with frequent frosts. It has a somewhat milder climate than other Saudi cities due to its higher altitude.

Climate data for Hail (1991-2020)
Month	Jan	Feb	Mar	Apr	May	Jun	Jul	Aug	Sep	Oct	Nov	Dec	Year
Record high °C (°F)	29.0 (84.2)	31.4 (88.5)	36.0 (96.8)	38.5 (101.3)	42.3 (108.1)	43.4 (110.1)	44.4 (111.9)	46.0 (114.8)	44.0 (111.2)	38.6 (101.5)	33.4 (92.1)	28.0 (82.4)	46.0 (114.8)
Mean daily maximum °C (°F)	17.8 (64.0)	20.4 (68.7)	24.3 (75.7)	29.7 (85.5)	34.8 (94.6)	38.7 (101.7)	39.7 (103.5)	40.4 (104.7)	38.2 (100.8)	32.7 (90.9)	24.2 (75.6)	19.6 (67.3)	30.0 (86.1)
Daily mean °C (°F)	10.9 (51.6)	13.3 (55.9)	17.3 (63.1)	22.7 (72.9)	28.0 (82.4)	32.0 (89.6)	33.2 (91.8)	33.6 (92.5)	30.8 (87.4)	25.0 (77.0)	17.2 (63.0)	12.5 (54.5)	23.0 (73.5)
Mean daily minimum °C (°F)	4.1 (39.4)	6.0 (42.8)	9.8 (49.6)	15.0 (59.0)	20.0 (68.0)	22.9 (73.2)	24.0 (75.2)	24.5 (76.1)	21.8 (71.2)	16.6 (61.9)	10.4 (50.7)	5.8 (42.4)	15.1 (59.1)
Record low °C (°F)	−10.0 (14.0)	−5.8 (21.6)	−1.4 (29.5)	5.2 (41.4)	10.4 (50.7)	16.5 (61.7)	17.7 (63.9)	18.0 (64.4)	14.0 (57.2)	8.0 (46.4)	−1.0 (30.2)	−5.6 (21.9)	−10.0 (14.0)
Average precipitation mm (inches)	10.8 (0.43)	6.2 (0.24)	16.7 (0.66)	11.5 (0.45)	6.3 (0.25)	0.1 (0.00)	0.1 (0.00)	0.1 (0.00)	0.0 (0.0)	5.6 (0.22)	15.4 (0.61)	7.0 (0.28)	79.9 (3.15)
Average precipitation days (≥ 1.0 mm)	1.6	1.0	2.1	1.9	1.2	0.1	0.0	0.1	0.0	1.6	2.6	1.3	13.4
Average relative humidity (%)	56	48	42	35	26	18	17	18	19	29	46	55	34
Average dew point °C (°F)	0 (32)	0 (32)	1 (34)	3 (37)	3 (37)	1 (34)	2 (36)	4 (39)	3 (37)	3 (37)	4 (39)	2 (36)	2 (36)
Mean monthly sunshine hours	248.0	240.1	282.1	279.0	310.0	354.0	372.0	356.5	279.0	291.4	246.0	235.6	3,493.7
Mean daily sunshine hours	8.0	8.5	9.1	9.3	10.0	11.8	12.0	11.5	9.3	9.4	8.2	7.6	9.6
Source 1: World Meteorological Organization, Deutscher Wetterdienst (humidity 1970–1993, sun)
Source 2: Time and Date (dewpoints, 1985–2015)

== Sights ==
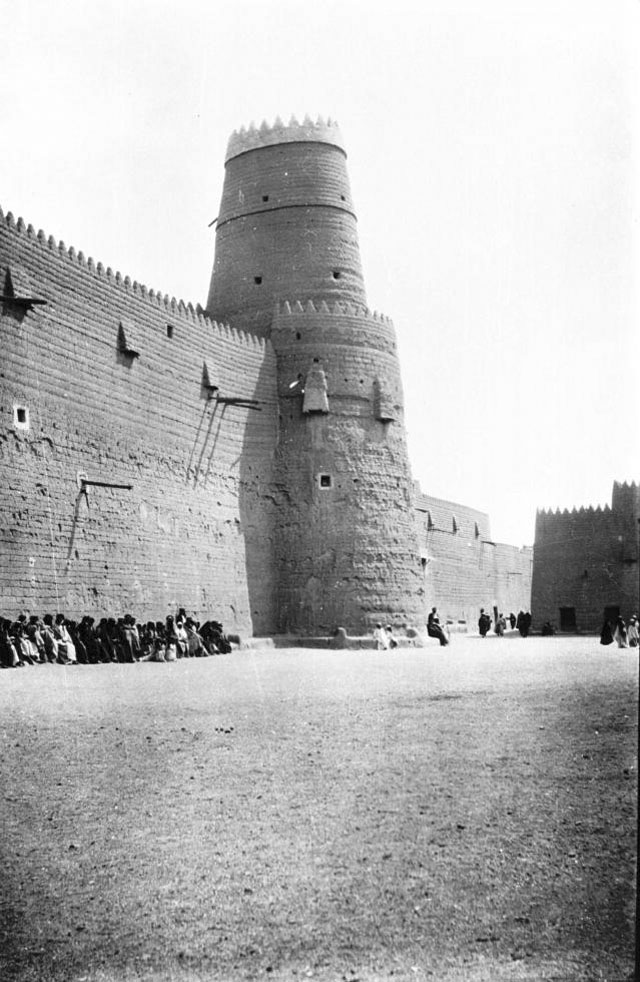
Barzan Palace

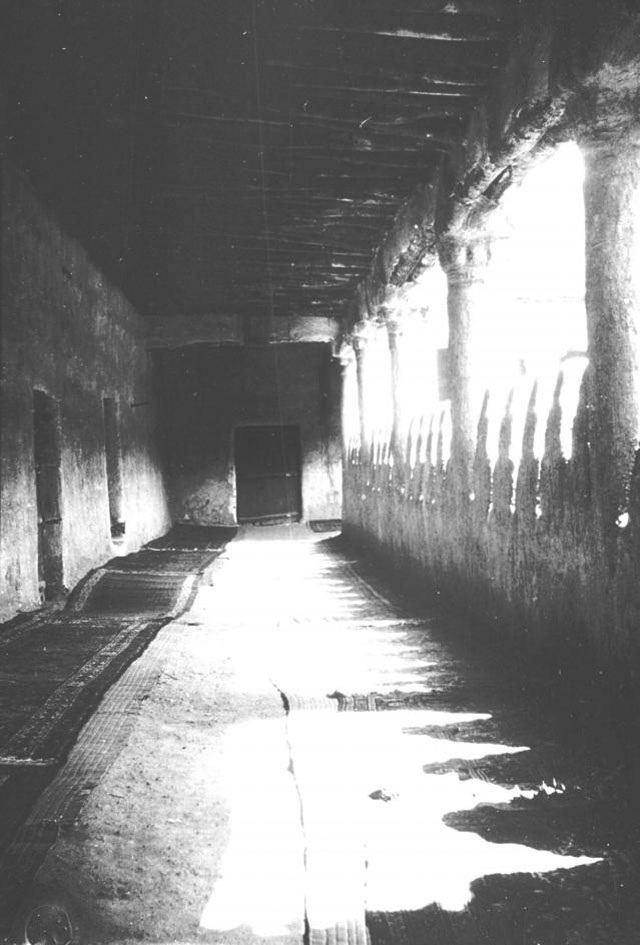
Corridor with rugs off courtyard of Barzan

- Barzan Palace was a historic palace that used to be located in Hail up until the 1920s. It was built in 1808 by Prince Muhammad bin Abdul-Muhsin Al Ali over an area of more than 300,000 square meters. The Palace was completed during the rule of the 2nd Rashidi emir, Talal bin Abdullah (1848–68). The Palace consisted of 3 floors, the first had the reception halls, gardens, and kitchens. The second had the diplomatic guest rooms. The third had the royal family rooms. It was demolished at the orders of Ibn Saud after the conquest of Hail in 1921.
- Barzan Souk is in the place where many years ago stood the Barzan Palace of the Rashidi extended family who governed the area around Hail.
- Friday Market is a traditional-style souk, held on Friday because it is a national weekend.
- Garden Mall is the largest shopping mall in Hail,located near the famous Fahad Ali arafi street it has shops like lifestyle, shoe mart, babyshop, H&M, giordano, iconic etc. "Samah Center" became the second largest shopping center in Hail. The third being the "Hyper Panda" shopping mall.
- Airif Fort (also spelled Oreif) is on a hill on the edge of the city. It is a mud-brick (adobe) fort built over 200 years ago as a combined observation post and stronghold. There is a view of the city from the main watchtower.
- Qishlah Fortress is an impressive sight located in the center of Ha'il. The current building was built in the 1940s while Prince Abdulaziz bin Musaed held office in Hail province. It is the largest traditional mud-brick fortress in Hail and is very well restored and preserved both outside and inside. It was used mostly as a barracks. Its two floors are 142.8x141.2 meters high, its walls are 8.5m high, and it has eight large watch-towers along with the wall with two main gates, eastern and western, and has a large inner courtyard with old military items on exhibition.
- At-Turathy Restaurant is a large historical mud-brick building located in Hail center which is used as a traditional restaurant. Its appearance is half-restaurant, half-museum with a large number of local traditional items used as decorations. The atmosphere is very traditional, food is traditional, and seating is on the floor.
- Hail Roundabouts are located in different parts of the city. These have large sculptures of traditional items located in the center of the traffic rotaries which are decorative fountains. One has a Gerba (traditional animal skin canteen) built as a fountain, another has a Mabakara (traditional incense burner) with Dellahs (traditional coffee pots) and cups around it built as a fountain.
- Hail Museum is the museum of the city of Hail. It is also one of the places where visitors can buy permits to see the petroglyphs near the oasis of Jubbah, Saudi Arabia, the other place being Ateeq Naif al-Shammari's Jubbah Palace of Heritage museum just off the main street in the town of Jubbah itself. The rock carvings, which are believed to date from 5500 BC are in an area that is about an hour and a half from Hail city by car. Tours to the Nafud desert can also be organized there.
- Aja Palace is located on the outskirts of the city. It was where the former governor of Hail province Prince Saud bin Abdulmohsen lived. It can only be seen from a distance - from the main highway nearby. It is a residential compound and as such is not open to the general public for sightseeing.
- Hail Desert Life Festival is an annual festival held in the province of Hail to celebrate and exchange experiences about desert life and culture around the world.
- Hail Rally is an important event in Hail and even in Saudi Arabia as it is the first car rally in Saudi Arabia, which started in 2006 and was approved by Fédération Internationale de l'Automobile in 2008.

== Education ==
=== Hail University ===
The University of Hail (UoH) began as Hail Community College (HCC), established in September 1998 (28 years ago) under the supervision of the King Fahd University of Petroleum and Minerals (KFUPM). HCC was the first community college launched as part of a national initiative to expand higher-education opportunities for Saudi Arabian students. It initially offered associate-degree programs in Business administration, Computer Systems, and Electronic engineering and Instrumentation, later expanding to bachelor’s degrees in Applied Electrical Engineering, Computer Science, and Management Information Systems.

The University of Hail was officially founded on 14 June 2006.

In 2007, the men’s Hail Teachers College (now the College of Education) and the Girls College of Education were incorporated into the university. Both institutions were previously affiliated with the Ministry of Education.

=== Colleges of Technology ===
Hail also hosts several colleges and institutes affiliated with the Technical and Vocational Training Corporation (TVTC), offering technical and vocational diploma programs for both men and women.

=== General Education ===
All schools in Hail, from elementary to high school, are supervised by the Ministry of Education.

== Transportation ==
=== Air ===
Hail International Airport serves as the main airport for the city and province, providing both domestic and limited international flights.

=== Rail ===
Hail is served by Hail railway station, which is part of the Riyadh–Qurayyat railway operated by Saudi Arabia Railways. The station was opened in 2017 and connects Hail with Riyadh, Majmaah, Al-Qassim, Al-Jouf, and Qurayyat.

== Sports ==
Hail is home to several sports clubs, with Al-Tai and Al-Jabalain being the most prominent. The Prince Abdulaziz bin Musaed Sports City Stadium serves as the main sports hub of the province and is the home venue for both clubs.

Hail hosts the Hail Rally, a popular motorsport event in Saudi Arabia.

== See also ==
- Provinces of Saudi Arabia
- List of governorates of Saudi Arabia
- List of cities and towns in Saudi Arabia
- Salma Mountains
