= Abdulaziz bin Musaed bin Jiluwi Al Saud =

Saudi royal and military commander (died 1977)

Abdulaziz bin Musaed
- عبدالعزيز بن مساعد
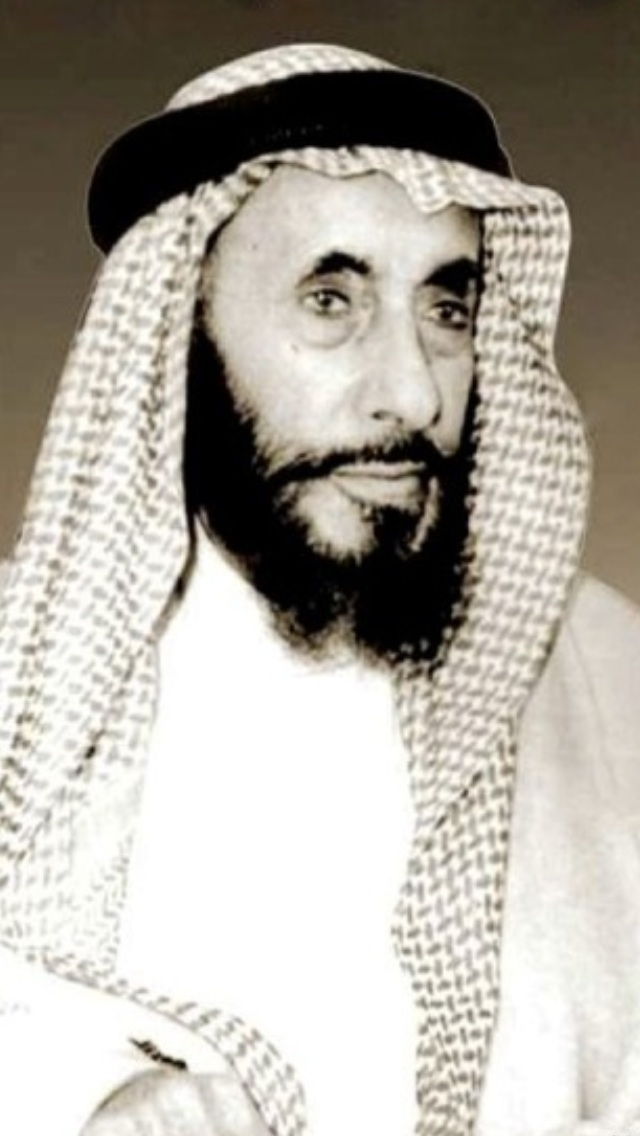

2nd Governor of Hail Province
- In office 1923–1970
- Appointed by: King Abdulaziz
- Monarchs: Abdulaziz; Saud; Faisal
- Preceded by: Ibrahim Al-Sabhan
- Succeeded by: Fahd bin Saad

Personal details
- Born: 1885 Riyadh, Second Saudi state
- Died: 19 February 1977 (aged 92) Riyadh, Saudi Arabia
- Resting place: Al Oud cemetery, Riyadh
- Spouses: See list: Princess Hussa bint Abdul Rahman Al Saud; Princess Tarfah bint Musaed Al-Batall Al-Mutairi; Princess Noura bint Hamoud Al-Sabhan; Princess Ruqayyah bint Ibrahim Al-Rashoudi; Princess Azizah; Princess Sultana Al-Shahri; Princess Noura bint Hassan Al-Hasan Al-Rashid
- Children: See list: Prince Abdullah; Prince Jiluwi; Princess Munira; Princess Sarah; Princess Lolwah; Princess Al Jawhara; Princess Al Anoud; Princess Modhi; Princess Noura
- Parent(s): Musaed bin Jiluwi (father); Hussa bint Abdullah (mother)
- Relatives: See list: Al Jawhara bint Musaed (sister); Jiluwi bin Turki (grandfather); Turki bin Abdullah (great-grandfather); Abdullah bin Muhammad (great-great-grandfather)

Military service
- Allegiance: Third Saudi state
- Branch/service: Saudi Arabian Army
- Years of service: 1902–1934
- Rank: Commander
- Battles/wars: Unification of Saudi Arabia; Battle of Riyadh (1902); Battle of Al-Bukiryah (1904); Battle of Shinanah (1904); Battle of Majmaah (1907); Battle of Tarafiyah (1907); Conquest of Asir 1920; Saudi conquest of Hail (1921); Ikhwan rebellion (1927–1930); Saudi–Yemeni War (1934)

Abdulaziz bin Musaed bin Jiluwi Al Saud (1885–1977; Arabic: عبدالعزيز بن مساعد بن جلوي آل سعود) was a Saudi Arabian military commander and royal. He played a key role in the campaigns led by Ibn Saud, including the conquest of Asir, where he commanded a contingent that secured the surrender of Abha. He was the brother-in-law of Ibn Saud, the maternal uncle of future King Khalid, and the father-in-law of future King Fahd.

== Biography ==
Abdulaziz bin Musaed was the grandson of Jiluwi bin Turki and the full brother of Al Jawhara bint Musaed. He grew up an orphan after his father Musaed bin Jiluwi was killed during the fall of the Second Saudi state in 1891. His sister Al Jawhara married their second cousin Ibn Saud, who later became the first King of Saudi Arabia. Al Jawhara and Ibn Saud had three children: King Khalid, Prince Mohammed, and Princess Al Anoud.

Ibn Saud sent Abdulaziz bin Musaed with a strong contingent of warriors to conquer Asir in 1920. Abdulaziz later served as the second governor of Hail Province from 1923 to 1970, making him the longest-serving governor of the province. He also served as governor of Al-Qassim Province for a period.

Three of Abdulaziz's daughters married members of the powerful Sudairi Seven. His daughters Al Anoud (died 1999), Munira, and Al Jawhara were the wives of King Fahd, Prince Sultan, and Prince Nayef, respectively. Princess Al Jawhara and Prince Nayef had two sons together, Saud bin Nayef and Muhammad bin Nayef.

Abdulaziz bin Musaed died in February 1977 and was buried next to the grave of Ibn Saud.

His sons also held important provincial governorships. Abdullah bin Abdulaziz (1931–2015), like his father, served as governor of the Northern Borders Province from 1957 until 4 July 2015, making him the longest-serving governor of that province. His other son, Jiluwi bin Abdulaziz, has served as governor of Najran Province since 12 November 2014.

== See also ==
- Hail Province
- Hail City
- Unification of Saudi Arabia
