= Arar =

Arar or Ar-Ar may refer to:

== Geography and history ==
- Arar City, the capital and seat city of Saudi Arabia's Northern Borders Province
  - Arar border crossing, a Saudi–Iraqi border crossing near Arar City and Nukhayb, Iraq
- Arar, Pakistan, a village in Sargodha District, Pakistan
- Saône, a river in eastern France, formerly known as Arar
- Battle of the Arar, a battle between the Romans and the Helvetii in 58 BC

== People ==
- Arar (surname)
  - Ege Arar (born 1996), Turkish basketball player
  - Funda Arar (born 1975), Turkish singer
  - Maher Arar (born 1970), Canadian-Syrian engineer, deported from the US
    - Arar v. Ashcroft, a legal case brought by Maher Arar
  - Taleb Abu Arar (born 1967), Bedouin Israeli Arab politician
- Mustafa Wahbi al-Tal (1897–1949), Jordanian poet nicknamed Arar

== Science ==
- Argon–argon dating, a radiometric dating method
- Juniperus phoenicea, also known as Arâr, a juniper found throughout the Mediterranean region
- Tetraclinis, also known as arar, a genus of evergreen coniferous tree endemic to the western Mediterranean region

== Organizations ==
- Azienda Rilievo Alienazione Residuati, Italian war surplus disposal organization

== See also ==
- Arrar, a village in Chakwal District, Pakistan
