= Mishaal (name) =

Mishaal or Mishal is a unisex given name of Arabic origin. Notable people with the name include:

== Given name ==
=== Mishaal ===
- Mishaal bin Saud Al Rashid (1913–1931), member of the Rashidi dynasty
- Mishaal Al-Saeed (born 1983), Saudi footballer
- Mishaal bin Abdulaziz Al Saud (1926–2017), Saudi royal and government official
- Mishaal bin Abdullah Al Saud (born 1970) (born 1970), Saudi royal and government official
- Mishaal bin Abdullah Al Saud, Saudi royal and government official
- Mishaal bint Fahd Al Saud (1958–1977), Saudi royal
- Mishaal bin Majid Al Saud (born 1957), Saudi royal and government official
- Mishaal bin Saud Al Saud (born 1940), Saudi royal and military officer
- Mishaal bin Hamad bin Khalifa Al Thani (born 1972), Qatari royal and former crown prince of Qatar

=== Mishal ===
- Mishal Awad Sayaf Alhabiri (born 1980), Saudi Guantanamo detainee
- Mishal AlMarzouqi, Emirati mechatronics engineer and innovator
- Mishal Al-Harbi (athlete) (born 1975), Kuwaiti sprinter
- Mishal Husain (born 1973), British journalist, broadcaster, and author
- Mishal Hamed Kanoo (born 1969), Emirati businessman
- Mishal Raheja, Indian television actor
- Mishal Al-Ahmad Al-Jaber Al-Sabah (born 1940), Emir of Kuwait
- Mishal bin Abdullah bin Abdulaziz bin Musaed Al Saud, Saudi royal and politician
