= Mishal bin Abdullah bin Abdulaziz bin Musaed Al Saud =

Saudi Arabian royal and politician

Mishal bin Abdullah bin Abdulaziz bin Musaed bin Jiluwi Al Saud

3rd Governor of the Northern Borders Province
- In office 13 July 2015 – 22 April 2017
- Appointed by: King Salman
- Monarch: Salman
- Preceded by: Abdullah bin Abdulaziz
- Succeeded by: Faisal bin Khalid

Personal details
- Born: Arar, Saudi Arabia
- Parent: Abdullah bin Abdulaziz (father)
- Education: University of Denver
- Awards: Order of Merit; Kuwait Liberation Medal

Mishal bin Abdullah Al Saud (Arabic: مشعل بن عبدالله آل سعود) is a Saudi Arabian royal and politician. He served as the third Governor of the Northern Borders Province from 13 July 2015 to 22 April 2017. Prior to his appointment as governor, Mishal served as an advisor to King Salman.

== Biography ==
Prince Mishal was born in Arar City and completed his early education there, receiving his general secondary school certificate. He is the son of Abdullah bin Abdulaziz bin Musaed, the grandson of Abdulaziz bin Musaed and Tarfah bint Musaed Al-Batall Al-Mutairi, and the great-grandson of Jiluwi bin Turki. He later earned a bachelor's degree in industrial management, followed by a master's degree in international business administration and a master's degree in political science from the University of Denver. He also obtained a doctorate in international relations from the same university.

After completing his studies, Mishal worked alongside Prince Sultan bin Abdulaziz as head of the Office of the Information Centre. He also served as an advisor, at the rank of minister, to Salman bin Abdulaziz during his tenure as Crown Prince and later as King.

Mishal was appointed as Governor of the Northern Borders Province on 13 July 2015, following the death of his father, Abdullah bin Abdulaziz bin Jiluwi, who had served as governor from 1957 until his death in 2015. Mishal’s term ended on 23 April 2017, when Faisal bin Khalid was appointed to the position.

Mishal has received several honors and medals, including the Order of Merit in 2008 and the Kuwait Liberation Medal in 1991.

== See also ==
- Arar City
- Northern Borders Province
- House of Saud
