= Abdullah bin Abdulaziz Al Saud (1931–2015) =

Saudi royal and governor

Abdullah bin Abdulaziz bin Musaed bin Jiluwi Al Saud

Governor of Al-Qassim Province
- In office 1947–1957
- Appointed by: King Abdulaziz
- Monarchs: Abdulaziz; Saud
- Preceded by: Abdulaziz bin Musaed
- Succeeded by: Mohammed bin Abdullah

2nd Governor of the Northern Borders Province
- In office 1957 – 4 July 2015
- Appointed by: King Saud
- Monarchs: Saud; Faisal; Khalid; Fahd; Abdullah; Salman
- Preceded by: Mohammed bin Ahmed
- Succeeded by: Mishal bin Abdullah

Personal details
- Born: 1 January 1931 Hail City, Kingdom of Hejaz and Nejd
- Died: 4 July 2015 (aged 84) Arar, Saudi Arabia
- Resting place: Al-Adl cemetery, Mecca
- Children: See list: Prince Mansour bin Abdullah; Prince Musaed bin Abdullah; Prince Fahd bin Abdullah; Prince Sultan bin Abdullah; Prince Mishal bin Abdullah; Prince Muteb bin Abdullah; Prince Mishari bin Abdullah; Prince Saad bin Abdullah; Prince Bandar bin Abdullah; Prince Turki bin Abdullah; Prince Faisal bin Abdullah; Princess Qumashah bint Abdullah; Princess Al-Bandari bint Abdullah
- Parents: Abdulaziz bin Musaed (father); Tarfah bint Musaed Al-Batall Al-Mutairi (mother)

Abdullah bin Abdulaziz Al Saud (Arabic: عبد الله بن عبد العزيز بن مساعد بن جلوي آل سعود) (1 January 1931 – 4 July 2015) was a Saudi Arabian royal and politician. He served as the second governor of the Northern Borders Province from 1957 until his death in 2015. Prior to that, he was the governor of Al-Qassim Province from 1947 to 1957. He was one of the longest-serving governors in the kingdom.

== Biography ==
Prince Abdullah bin Abdulaziz bin Musaed was born in Hail City in 1931. He was the son of Prince Abdulaziz bin Musaed and Princess Tarfah bint Musaed Al-Batall Al-Mutairi. His father was a cousin of King Abdulaziz and served as a commander during the unification of Saudi Arabia. He was the grandson of Musaed bin Jiluwi. His brother, Prince Jiluwi bin Abdulaziz, later became the governor of Najran Province.

Prince Abdullah served as the governor of Al-Qassim Province between 1947 and 1957, appointed by King Abdulaziz. He was later appointed by King Saud as the governor of the Northern Borders Province in 1957. He served in this position until his death in 2015.

== Death ==
Prince Abdullah bin Abdulaziz died on 4 July 2015. He was buried after Isha prayer on 6 July 2015 at Al-Adl cemetery in Mecca.

== See also ==
- Arar City
- Hail City
- Northern Borders Province
- House of Saud
