= Jiluwi bin Abdulaziz Al Saud =

Saudi royal, military officer and governor

Governor of Najran Province
- In office: November 2014 - present
- Predecessor: Mishaal bin Abdullah
- Monarch: King Abdullah; King Salman
- Born: 1958 (age 67–68); Ḥaʼil
Names
- Jiluwi bin Abdulaziz bin Musaed bin Jiluwi bin Turki Al Saud
- House: House of Saud
- Father: Abdulaziz bin Musaed

Jiluwi bin Abdulaziz Al Saud (Arabic: جلوي بن عبد العزيز آل سعود; born 1958) is a member of the Jiluwi cadet branch of the Saudi royal family, House of Saud. The Jiluwis are the descendant of Jiluwi bin Turki who was younger brother of King Abdulaziz's grandfather and the second ruler of the Emirate of Najd, Faisal bin Turki. He is a former military personnel and has been serving as the governor of Najran Province since November 2014.

== Biography ==
Prince Jiluwi was born in Hail in 1958. His father, Abdulaziz bin Musaed, was the governor of Hail Province and the full brother of Al Jawhara bint Musaed, mother of Prince Mohammed and King Khalid.

He is a graduate of the School of Paratroopers and Special Forces Security Center and held a diploma from the British Parachute Association. He involved in the Operation Desert Storm. Following his retirement from the Saudi military forces he was appointed the deputy governor of Tabuk Province which he held between April 2000 and July 2004. His next post was the deputy governor of the Eastern Province from July 2004 to November 2014.

Jiluwi bin Abdulaziz was named the governor of Najran Province with the rank of minister in November 2014. He replaced Mishaal bin Abdullah in the post.

Political offices
Preceded by Mishaal bin Abdullah	Governor of Najran Province; November 2014 – present	Succeeded by Incumbent
