= List of regions of Saudi Arabia by Human Development Index =

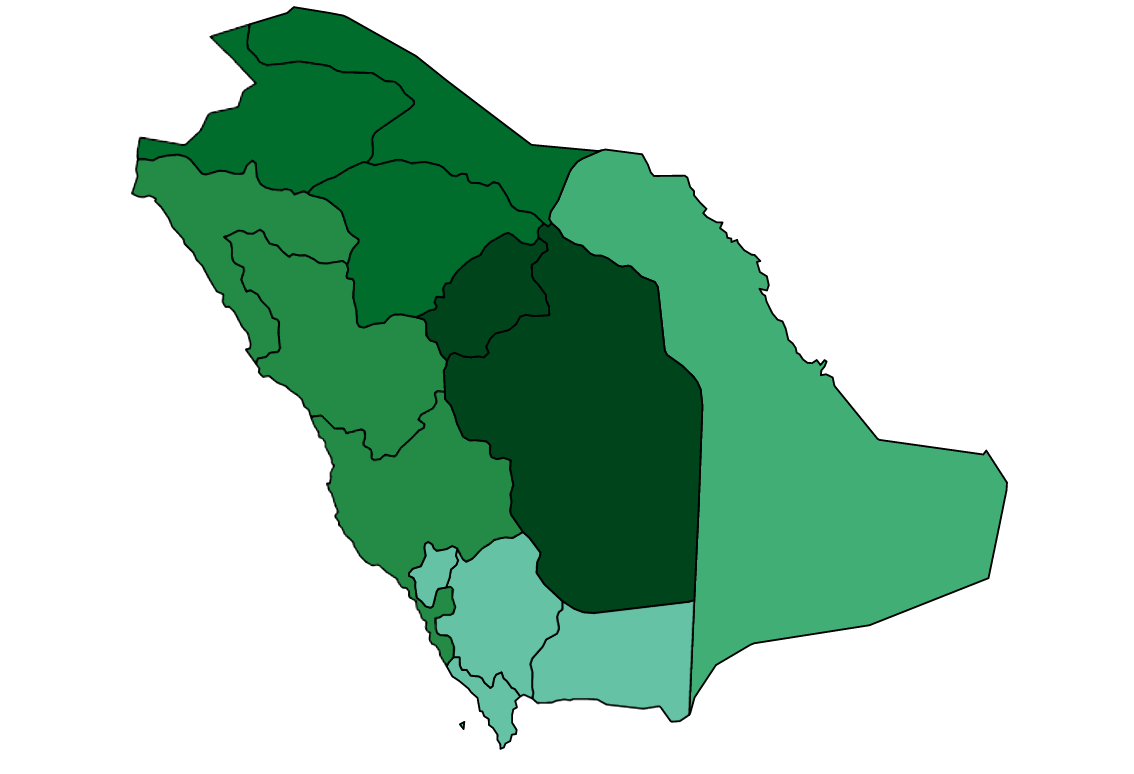
Saudi regions in 2023 by HDI 0.924 0.914 0.895 0.886 0.879

This is a list of regions of Saudi Arabia by Human Development Index as of 2024 with data for the year 2023.

Rank	Region (provinces)	HDI (2023)
Very high human development
1	Center (Riyadh, Al-Qassim)	0.952
2	North (Northern Borders, Al Jawf, Ha'il)	0.943
–	Saudi Arabia	0.928
3	West (Mecca, Medina, Tabuk)	0.924
4	Eastern province	0.914
5	South (Al Bahah, Jizan, 'Asir, Najran)	0.907

== See also ==
- List of countries by Human Development Index
