= Flight 163 =

Flight 163 may refer to:

Listed chronologically

- Saudia Flight 163, caught fire on 19 August 1980
- Iraqi Airways Flight 163, hijacked and bombed on 25 December 1986
