= Al Jawhara bint Musaed Al Saud =

Saudi royal (1891–1919)

- Born: 1891
- Died: 1919 (aged 27–28); Riyadh
- Spouse: Abdulaziz, Emir of Nejd (later King of Saudi Arabia) (m. 1908)
- Issue: Prince Muhammad; King Khalid; Princess Al Anoud
Names
- Al Jawhara bint Musaed bin Jiluwi bin Turki bin Abdullah bin Muhammad bin Saud
- House: Al Saud
- Father: Musaed bin Jiluwi bin Turki bin Abdullah bin Muhammad bin Saud
- Mother: Hussa bint Abdullah bin Turki Al Turki

Al Jawhara bint Musaed bin Jiluwi Al Saud (Arabic: الجوهرة بنت مساعد بن جلوي آل سعود Al Jawhara bint Musāʿid bin Jiluwī Āl Suʿūd; 1891–1919) was the fourth spouse and one of the 22 consorts of Abdulaziz, Emir of Nejd, who later became the first King of Saudi Arabia. She was the mother of King Khalid, Prince Muhammad and Princess Al Anoud. King Abdulaziz stated in 1951 that despite being married many times, Al Jawhara bint Musaed was his only love.

== Background ==
Al Jawhara bint Musaed was from the Al Jiluwis, a cadet branch of the Al Saud. The Al Jiluwi family is connected to the Al Saud family because they are descended from Prince Jiluwi bin Turki, who was the younger brother of Abdulaziz's grandfather, Faisal bin Turki Al Saud. Prince Jiluwi served as governor of Unayzah during Faisal's reign.

Al Jiluwi and Al Sudairi clans were strong supporters of the Al Saud in the early years of state formation. The members of Al Jiluwi family allied themselves with Abdulaziz to eliminate the threat posed by the Al Kabir clan. For instance, Abdallah bin Jiluwi served as his deputy commander and helped Al Saud in the conquest of the eastern region of Arabia. He served as the governor of the Eastern Province from 1913 to 1938. Then, his son, Saud bin Abdullah, served as the governor of this province between 1938 and 1967. Next, another son, Abdul Muhsin bin Abdullah, served as the governor of the province from 1967 to 1985 until being replaced by Prince Muhammed bin Fahd.

Additionally, the members of Al Jiluwi intermarried with the Al Sauds. King Faisal, King Fahd, King Abdullah, Prince Sultan and Prince Nayef all married women from the Al Jiluwi clan.

== Early life ==
Al Jawhara was born in 1891. She was the daughter of Musaed, a nephew of Faisal bin Turki Al Saud. Her mother was Hussa bint Abdullah bin Turki Al Turki. Al Jawhara's paternal grandparents were Prince Jiluwi bin Turki who was the son of Turki bin Abdullah and Noura bint Ahmed Al Sudairi, a sister of King Abdulaziz's mother, Sara bint Ahmed Al Sudairi.

Abdulaziz bin Musaed, a full brother of Al Jawhara, was the governor of Ha'il Province. One of Abdulaziz bin Musaed's spouses was the sister of King Abdulaziz, Hussa bint Abdul Rahman. They had no child. The daughter of Abdulaziz bin Musaed, Al Jawhara bint Abdulaziz, was the wife of late Prince Nayef and the mother of Prince Saud and Prince Mohammad, former crown prince of Saudi Arabia. Another daughter, Al Anood bint Abdulaziz, was the first wife of King Fahd.

== Marriage ==
The marriage of Al Jawhara and Abdulaziz was arranged by Sara bint Ahmed, Abdulaziz's mother. They married in 1908 when she was seventeen years old. She was the fourth spouse of King Abdulaziz. It was the only marriage of King Abdulaziz to one of the Al Saud members or a close relative.

Al Jawhara left him once due to the disputes, but soon they reunited. Their marriage produced three children; Prince Mohammad, King Khalid and Princess Al Anoud. Her daughter, Al Anoud, married to the sons of Saad bin Abdul Rahman. She first married Fahd bin Saad and they divorced in 1935. Then she married Saud bin Saad, brother of her ex-husband, in 1940.

In Spring 1913, before the capture of Al Hasa, Abdulaziz was in Hofuf and sent an ode to Al Jawhara. She was special to him for several reasons. First, Al Jawhara was his second cousin. Secondly, Abdulaziz's mother chose her as a wife for his son. And lastly, she died at a young age.

== Activities ==
Al Jawhara bint Musaed was interested in horse riding and breeding. She formed a stable within the palace in Riyadh and hired the best Najdi horse riders to train cavalry who in turn contributed significantly to King Abdulaziz's attempts to unify Saudi Arabia. She donated her books to a local organization.

== Death ==
Al Jawhara bint Musaed died in Riyadh in 1919 in the flu epidemic, which also killed Prince Turki bin Abdulaziz, eldest son of King Abdulaziz. Her death is reported to have devastated King Abdulaziz. He mourned for weeks and locked himself up in her room in the palace, and no one was allowed to enter the room except for Abdulaziz's sister, Noura bint Abdul Rahman. Her possessions were also kept untouched, and her maids continued to live in the palace.

King Abdulaziz visited Al Jawhara's grave each Friday after the morning prayers until the end of his life. In private meetings with his friends he talked about her stating that she was a great companion for him during the difficult times of establishing his rule.
