= Muhammad Hazi =

Algerian writer

- Education: École Normale Supérieure
- Occupations: Writer and professor
- Notable work: Loaned Hemiparesis in Exams and Assignments - Part I. From the Analysis Notebooks: Real functions with a Real Variable - Their Limits and Continuities. From the Analysis Books: Riemannian Integral and Original Function Calculation - Theory and Application. Loaned Hemiparesis in Exams and Assignments - Part II.
- Awards: The second prize of the Supreme Council of the Arabic Language in the 2012 competition

Muhammad Hazi (Arabic: محمد حازي) is an Algerian writer. He graduated from École Normale Supérieure, University Of Science And Technology Houari Boumediene, and Universities of Paris VI and XI (Center of Orsay). He is an associate professor at the National School of Public Works of Kouba, the Polytechnic School of El Harrach, and the Ecole Normale Supérieure of Laghouat. He also worked at the Community College of Rafha in Saudi Arabia. He was a former director of studies and training at École Normale Supérieure in El-Kobba. He was also previously the head of the mathematics department at the same school and still works there as a teacher.

== Career ==
Apart from this academic career, Hazi has excelled in the field of writing, as he has published more than ten books in various fields mostly centered on science. His book “Key Principles in Topological Concepts” was widely popular and got adopted by educational institutions in Algeria. It is the first book in a trilogy including 'Key Principles in Topological Concepts,' 'Comprehensive Lessons in Metric Spaces,' and 'The Abstract Seat of Semantic Analysis.' Hazi's second book in the series, “Adequate Lessons in Metric Spaces,” a book in which he reviewed, in the context of metric spaces, the concepts of convergence, continuity, agglutination, and interconnectedness, as well as several famous and important theorems, which are among the main pillars of semantic analysis.

His third book titled “Functional analysis bench; Solved Exercises and Practice” is the final in the series. In this book, Hazi focuses on a structural tool, the systematic spaces and their features, and reviews aspects of its applications and ramifications. It was issued in six chapters: Systematic space: definitions and general properties, The space of linear and radial applications, additive families, Hilbertarian spaces, Fourier series, and an introduction to the theory of influences. Each chapter also contains many solved problems and exercises, and others for research, the number of which exceeds in total one hundred and forty-seven exercises.

Muhammad Hazi published more books over the years, one of which was the book “From the Notebooks of Numerical Sequences Analysis”, in which he reviewed a major pillar of the mathematics analysis program at the first university-level ـــ all scientific divisions and other branches and specializations participate. He followed it up with another book, "The False Loan in Exams and Homework," which did not achieve as much fame as the previous books.

Hazi later published a new series revolving around the mathematical analysis. He published a book entitled “From the Notebooks of Analysis: Riemannian Integration and Calculation of Original Functions.” It is a book in which he dealt with the Riemannian integral and the arithmetic of the original functions, and he referred to the generalized integrals in some detail. After that, he issued a book titled “From the Analysis Notebooks: Real Functions with a Real Variable - Their Ends and Continuity,” where he dealt with functions according to five sections: limits, continuation, prime functions, and their inverses, and two other sections for exercises and solutions. There is another book in the same series under the title “From the Analysis Notebooks: Ordinary Differential Equations of the First and Second Orders - Theoretical and Applications,” which is the book in which he mainly presented the Ordinary Differential Equations of the first and second orders, in addition to other manuals.

== List of works ==
This is a list of his most influential works:

- Functional analysis bench; Solved Exercises and Practice.
- Key Principles in Topological Concepts.
- From the Notebooks of Analysis of Numerical Sequences: Solved Exercises and Problems.
- Adequate Lessons in Metric Spaces.
- From the Analysis Notebooks: Differentiation and Finite Propagation of Real Functions with a Real Variable - Theory and Applications.
- Loaned Hemiparesis in Exams and Assignments - Part I.
- From the Analysis Notebooks: Real functions with a Real Variable - Their Limits and Continuities
- From the Analysis Books: Riemannian Integral and Original Function Calculation - Theory and Application.
- Loaned Hemiparesis in Exams and Assignments - Part II.
- From the Analysis Books: Ordinary Differential Equations of the First and Second-Order - Theoretical Structure and Applications.
