= Wadi Arar =

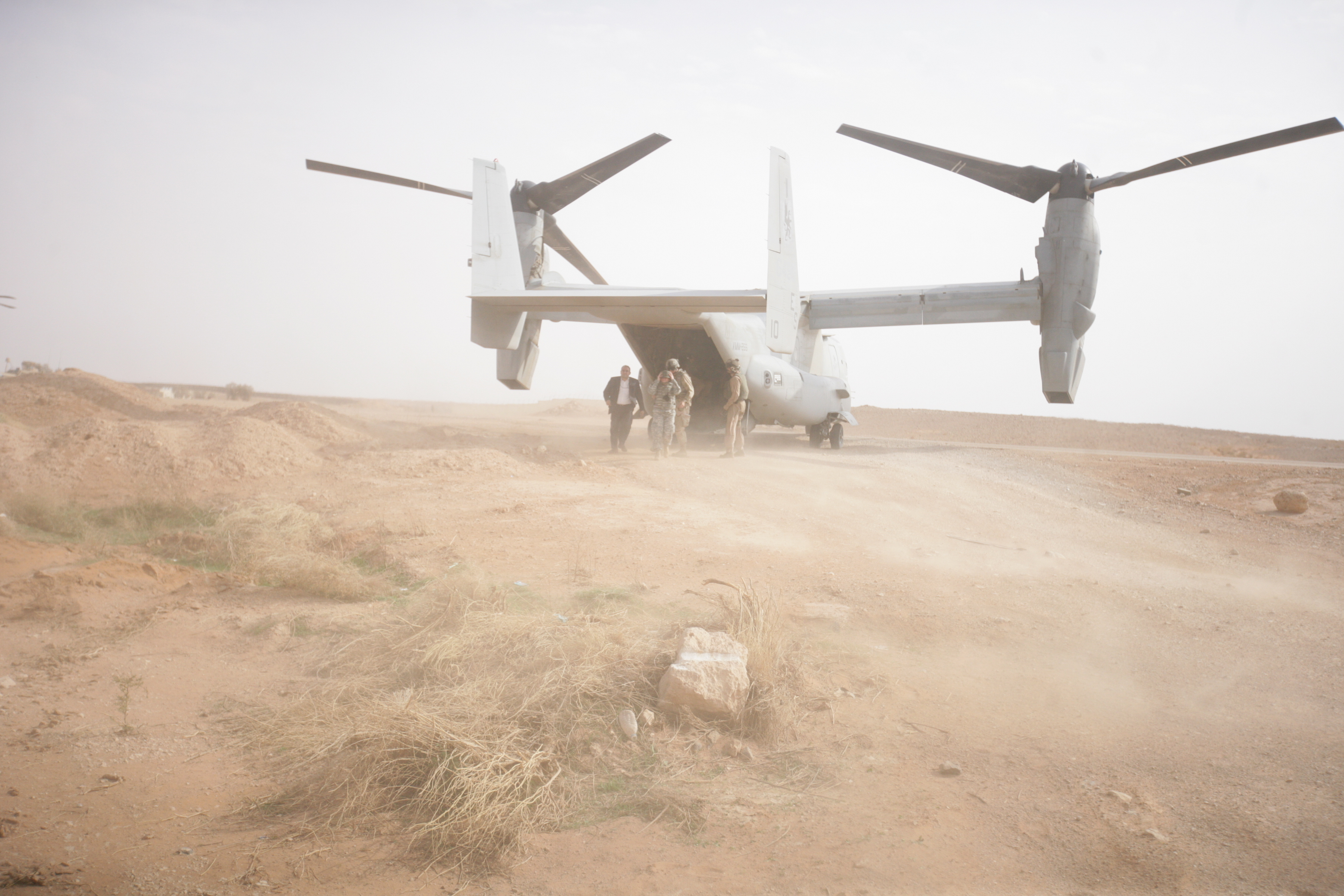
- Arar, near the Iraq–Saudi Arabia border

Location
- Country: Saudi Arabia
- Region: Northern Borders Province

Physical characteristics
- Source
  - location: South of Arar, Northern Borders Province
- Mouth
  - location: Flows into Iraq, merges into Euphrates valley
- Length: 125 km (78 mi)

Wadi Arar is a wadi, in the central part of the Northern Borders Province of Saudi Arabia. Originating about 125 km southwest of the city of Arar, it flows in a general southwest-to-northeast direction, eventually crossing into Iraq where it contributes to the Euphrates valley.

== Geography ==
Wadi Arar begins approximately 125 kilometers from the city of Arar, running northeastward, and passes close to the city itself. Along its course, the wadi merges with numerous smaller wadis and Sha’ibs before crossing the border into Iraq.

The wadi lies between latitudes 31°00’N and 30°45’N and longitudes 40°30’E and 41°05’E, at an average elevation of 568 meters above sea level.

== Geology ==
The regional bedrock along Wadi Arar consists primarily of Cretaceous-aged limestone and sandstone, with occasional layers of dolomite and silt. The area is marked by an arid desert environment, featuring multiple smaller seasonal streams (Sha’ibs) that feed into the main wadi during periods of rainfall.

== Hydrology ==
Although it is a seasonal watercourse, Wadi Arar plays a critical role in the drainage and soil sedimentation of the Northern Borders Province. The sediment within the wadi has been studied for its geological and civil engineering implications, reflecting typical alluvial processes in arid environments.

== Cultural and historical significance ==
Wadi Arar is historically associated with the tribe of Anizah. It is considered one of the main wadis of the Anizah tribal lands that ultimately feed into the Euphrates River system. Alongside Wadi Al-Khurr, it is one of the largest such wadis in the region.

== See also ==
- List of wadis of Saudi Arabia
- Geography of Saudi Arabia
