= Battle of Rawdat Muhanna =

معركة روضة مهنا Battle of Rawdat Muhanna
- Part of Saudi–Rashidi War
Date	12 April 1906
Location	Qassim region, Arabia
Result	Emirate of Riyadh victory
Territorial changes	End of Ottoman existence in Nejd and Qassim

Belligerents
Emirate of Jabal Shammar; Ottoman Empire	Emirate of Nejd and Hasa: Mutayr (braih branch)

Commanders and leaders
Abdulaziz bin Mutaib †	Abdulaziz Ibn Saud; Ibrahim bin Aqeel †

Strength
12,000	10,000

Casualties and losses
Unknown	35

The Battle of Rawdat Muhanna (Arabic: معركة روضة مهنا or Arabic: معركة روضة ابن مهنا) was a major battle of the Saudi–Rashidi War, during the unification of Saudi Arabia, fought between the Rashidi dynasty and Saudi rebels. It occurred on 12 April 1906, in Muhanna's Gardens in Qassim region. After Ibn Saud's victory in Battle of Shinanah, Abdulaziz bin Mithab, better known as Ibn Rashid, planned to forge a new alliance with Qassimi leaders. Ibn Saud sent his troops under the command of Ibrahim Ibn Aqeel to destroy this alliance before it grew. Ibn Aqeel's troops killed Ibn Rashid in the battle along with hundreds of his Qassimi and Ottoman allies. Ibn Saud's victory in this battle ended the Ottoman presence in Nejd and Qassim by the end of October 1906.

== Death of Abdulaziz bin Mutaib Al Rashid ==
Following repeated raids by Abdulaziz bin Mutaib Al Rashid on the Mutayr tribe, including attacks on the Smeran and Huwamel sub-tribes, the Mutayr sought revenge. Allying with Abdulaziz bin Abdul Rahman Al Saud, the Mutayr played a crucial role in the Battle of Rawdat Muhanna. During the confrontation, Abdulaziz bin Mutaib was killed, reportedly by a warrior from the Mutayr tribe, a decisive act that led to the collapse of Rashidi power. The involvement of the Mutayr sheikhs, including Aqab al-Habidani al-Ghaleeb, in leading their tribe during the battle was instrumental in securing the victory. This act of revenge not only avenged previous raids on the Mutayr but also further solidified the tribe's alliance with Ibn Saud, shifting the balance of power in central Arabia.
