= Sultan Ayoub Meo =

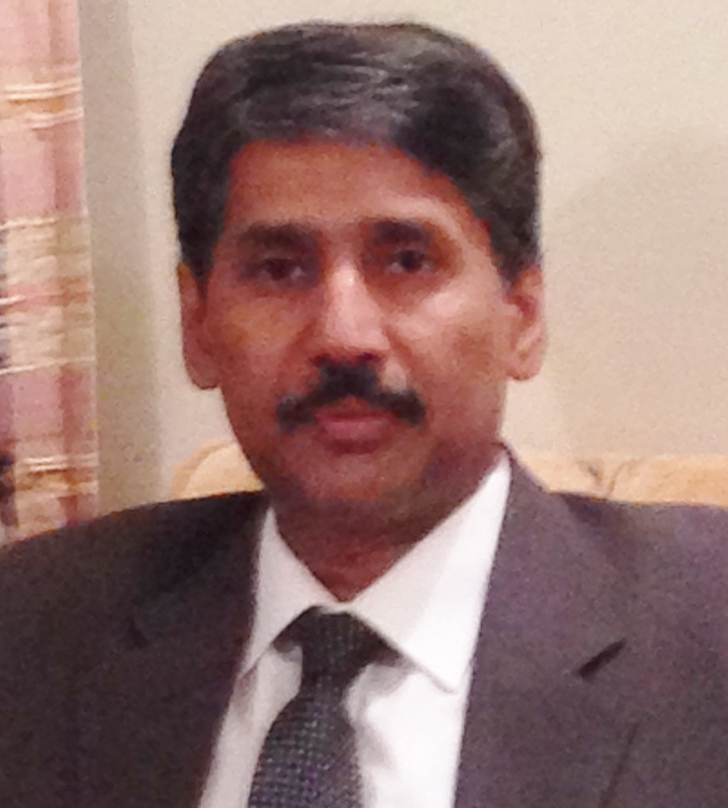
- Born: Ghogharo, Larkana, Pakistan
- Education: MBBS; PhD (Physiology); M Med Ed (University of Dundee)
- Known for: Research on diabetes, respiratory and cardiovascular effects of pollution
- Awards: KSU Excellence Award in Medicine (2017)
- Medical career
- Profession: Physician, clinical physiologist, academician
- Field: Physiology
- Institutions: King Saud University; King Edward Medical University
- Sub-specialties: Environmental pollution and chronic disease
- Website: faculty.ksu.edu.sa/en/smeo

Sultan Ayoub Meo is a Pakistani physician, clinical physiologist, and academician. He is a professor in the Department of Physiology at the College of Medicine, King Saud University. He is known for his research on the health impacts of environmental pollution, particularly its effects on the respiratory system, cardiovascular system, brain, and diabetes mellitus.

He is a Fellow of the Royal College of Physicians of Ireland (FRCP), Fellow of the Royal College of Physicians of London, Glasgow and Edinburgh. He has written 12 books in medical sciences and 300 articles, with 26,000 citations, h-index 66, and ranked among the top 2% of scientists worldwide. He received the KSU Excellence Award in Medicine in 2017.

== Early life and education ==
Meo was born in the village of Ghogharo, Larkana, Pakistan. He completed his medical degree (MBBS) and earned a Doctorate (PhD) in Physiology and Clinical Physiology. He earned a master's in medical education (M Med Ed) from the University of Dundee, Scotland.

== Career and research ==
Meo is a Professor and Consultant in the Department of Physiology at King Saud University.

=== Environmental pollution and chronic disease ===
Meo’s research focuses on the effects of air pollution and climate change on human health, particularly their links to type 2 diabetes mellitus, cardiovascular disease, and respiratory disorders. He has studied the mechanisms by which pollutants affect organs such as the brain, pancreas, and cardiovascular system.

He has authored Environmental Pollution and the Brain (2021), Environmental Pollution and Type 2 Diabetes Mellitus (2024), and Environmental Pollution and Cardiovascular Diseases (2025).

Meo's work has examined issues such as the relationship between air pollution, sandstorms, and SARS-CoV-2 transmission, and has appeared in journals including Science of the Total Environment, PLoS ONE, and the International Journal of Environmental Research and Public Health.

== Awards ==
Meo received the Excellency Award in Medicine in 2017 by The Governor of Riyadh, Prince Faisal bin Bandar bin Abdulaziz Al Saud. He was also appointed a distinguished Professor at the College of Medicine, King Saud University. Meo was also appointed as a Vice-Chancellor of King Edward Medical University, Lahore.

== Selected books ==
- Meo, Sultan Ayoub (2021). Environmental Pollution and the Brain. Boca Raton: CRC Press. ISBN 9781032080031.
- Meo, Sultan Ayoub (2024). Environmental Pollution and Type 2 Diabetes Mellitus. Elsevier. ISBN 9780443216466.
- Meo, Sultan Ayoub (2025). Environmental Pollution and Cardiovascular Diseases. Elsevier. ISBN 9780443267697.
- Meo, Sultan Ayoub (2026). Artificial Intelligence in Clinical, Diagnostic and Laboratory Medicine. Elsevier. ISBN 9780443459733.
