= Salman bin Abdulaziz Al Saud (born 1982) =

Saudi royal (born 1982)

- Born: 1 November 1982 (age 44); Riyadh, Saudi Arabia
- Spouse: Princess Oraib bint Abdullah Al Saud
Names
- Salman bin Abdulaziz bin Salman bin Mohammed bin Saud Al Saud
- Father: Abdulaziz bin Salman bin Muhammad Al Saud
- Mother: Nouf bint Abdullah bin Abdul Rahman Al Saud
- Education: King Saud University; Saint Clements University; Paris-Sorbonne University

Salman bin Abdulaziz Al Saud (Arabic: سلمان بن عبد العزیز آل سعود, romanized: Salmān bin ʿAbd al ʿAzīz ʾĀl Suʿūd; born 1 November 1982) is a member of the Saudi ruling family. He has been detained without charge or explanation since January 2018 as part of Saudi Crown Prince Mohammed bin Salman's 2017–2019 Saudi Arabian purge.

== Early life and education ==
Prince Salman was born in Riyadh on 1 November 1982. He is a member of a cadet branch of Al Saud, Al Kabeer. His mother is Princess Nouf bint Abdullah bin Abdul Rahman whose father, Abdullah bin Abdul Rahman, was the younger brother of King Abdulaziz Ibn Saud, founder of the Kingdom of Saudi Arabia. His father is Prince Abdulaziz bin Salman bin Mohammed Al Saud. His great-grandfather, Mohammed bin Saud, was the son of Noura bint Abdul Rahman and Saud Al Kabeer.

Prince Salman received his early education at the Najd School in Riyadh and graduated from King Saud University after studying law. He completed his postgraduate studies at Oxford University and obtained a master's Degree in international law at Saint Clements University. He received a PhD degree in international law from the Paris-Sorbonne University. His doctoral thesis was published in French and is entitled, Problèmes de base du droit des entreprises en difficulté: Etude comparée droit français-droit saoudien.

He is fluent in Arabic, English and French.

== Business ==
Prince Salman established Buonasera jet Ltd, a private aviation company in 2015 and one of the largest yacht charter company in the south of France, he owns 6 Mega Lürssen yachts. He is CEO of the company. He owns oil and construction business inside Saudi Arabia and in several other countries.

== Arrest ==
Prince Salman was detained in January 2018 as part of the 2017–2019 Saudi Arabian purge. Salman's father was also arrested two days after his son. People close to him told the Washington Post that he was summoned, in the middle of the night, to the palace where he was beaten and arrested. As of November 2018, Salman and his father had still not been released, according to his Paris-based attorney, Elie Hatem, and neither of them were charged as of October 2018. Again, neither were brought to trial, and there was no official recognition of their presence with the Saudi authorities. The lawyer and the family of the two princes confirmed that there were no corruption suspicion against them and stressed that they had been detained because they expressed their opinions.

Sources close to Salman also told The Washington Post that they believed Crown Prince Mohammed bin Salman harbored "personal jealousy" toward Salman.

Salman and his father were held at the al-Ha'ir Prison. His lawyer was in contact with the President of France Emmanuel Macron and the French Foreign Minister Jean-Yves Le Drian to achieve their release. Several members of the royal family campaigned in favor of Macron. The most active was the billionaire Prince Al-Waleed bin Talal who was still under house arrest. Following the assassination of journalist Jamal Khashoggi on 2 October 2018, the family of the two detained expressed grave concern about their fate, because they had not heard any news about them since they were summoned to the Royal Palace 10 months prior. As of 2026, he is still in jail, and his whereabouts are unknown.

== Personal life ==
Prince Salman married a daughter of King Abdullah, Oraib bint Abdullah. She is the blood sister of Prince Turki bin Abdullah who has been in detention since November 2017 and Mishaal bin Abdullah, and their mother is Tadhi bint Mishaan Al Jarba.

The net worth of Prince Salman was estimated at 2.7 billion USD in February 2017. Salman collects art pieces from around the world in his palaces. Salman is passionate about horse racing, falconry, and camel racing. He supports the Horse Annual Racing Prize taking place in Riyadh and set up the first camel race in France.
