= Arar (surname) =

Arar is a surname. Notable people with the surname include:

- Ege Arar (born 1996), Turkish basketball player
- Funda Arar (born 1975), Turkish singer
- Maher Arar (born 1970), Canadian-Syrian engineer, deported from the US
- Taleb Abu Arar (born 1967), Bedouin Israeli Arab politician
