= Turaif =

City and Governorate in the Northern Borders Province, Saudi Arabia

Turaif طريف
- City and Governorate
- Location of Turaif within the Northern Borders Province

- Location of Turaif within Saudi Arabia
- Coordinates: 31°40′39″N 038°39′11″E
- Country: Saudi Arabia
- Province: Northern Borders
- Region: Badiyat al-Sham
- Seat: Turaif City

Government
  - Type: Municipality
  - Body: Turaif Municipality

Population (2022)
  - Metro: 66,004 (Turaif Governorate)
- Time zone: UTC+03:00 (SAST)
- Area code: 014

Turaif (Arabic: طريف) is a city and governorate in northern Saudi Arabia. It is part of the Northern Borders Province and is located near the border with Jordan.

== Overview ==
Turaif is one of the cities that were established due to the presence of the Trans-Arabian Pipeline.

== Transportation ==
=== Air ===
Turaif Domestic Airport serves the governorate, providing scheduled domestic flights and connecting the governorate to major destinations within Saudi Arabia.

== Climate ==
Turaif has hot desert climate (Köppen climate classification: BWh) with long, very hot summers and cool winters. Frost during the night is common in the winter months. Snow may also fall at times. The lowest recorded temperature, −12.0 °C (10.4 °F), was measured in Turaif.

Climate data for Turaif Domestic Airport (1991–2020)
Month	Jan	Feb	Mar	Apr	May	Jun	Jul	Aug	Sep	Oct	Nov	Dec	Year
Record high °C (°F)	24.0 (75.2)	29.0 (84.2)	34.0 (93.2)	38.0 (100.4)	41.0 (105.8)	43.0 (109.4)	45.5 (113.9)	45.2 (113.4)	43.0 (109.4)	38.0 (100.4)	31.4 (88.5)	28.0 (82.4)	45.5 (113.9)
Mean daily maximum °C (°F)	13.2 (55.8)	15.6 (60.1)	20.2 (68.4)	25.8 (78.4)	31.2 (88.2)	35.4 (95.7)	37.6 (99.7)	37.8 (100.0)	34.8 (94.6)	29.1 (84.4)	20.5 (68.9)	15.1 (59.2)	26.4 (79.5)
Daily mean °C (°F)	7.3 (45.1)	9.3 (48.7)	13.6 (56.5)	18.9 (66.0)	24.1 (75.4)	27.9 (82.2)	30.0 (86.0)	30.0 (86.0)	27.0 (80.6)	21.8 (71.2)	13.8 (56.8)	8.9 (48.0)	19.4 (66.9)
Mean daily minimum °C (°F)	1.8 (35.2)	3.3 (37.9)	6.9 (44.4)	11.6 (52.9)	16.4 (61.5)	19.6 (67.3)	21.6 (70.9)	21.7 (71.1)	19.2 (66.6)	14.7 (58.5)	7.8 (46.0)	3.4 (38.1)	12.4 (54.3)
Record low °C (°F)	−12.2 (10.0)	−8.0 (17.6)	−6.0 (21.2)	−1.0 (30.2)	7.0 (44.6)	13.0 (55.4)	14.6 (58.3)	15.0 (59.0)	7.0 (44.6)	−1.0 (30.2)	−5.0 (23.0)	−6.0 (21.2)	−12.2 (10.0)
Average precipitation mm (inches)	12.7 (0.50)	12.1 (0.48)	11.6 (0.46)	8.2 (0.32)	3.5 (0.14)	0.1 (0.00)	0.0 (0.0)	0.0 (0.0)	0.3 (0.01)	4.9 (0.19)	9.7 (0.38)	11.4 (0.45)	74.3 (2.93)
Average precipitation days (≥ 1.0 mm)	2.7	2.6	2.0	1.3	0.8	0.0	0.0	0.0	0.2	1.1	1.6	2.3	14.7
Average relative humidity (%)	69	62	49	39	29	27	27	27	29	37	51	67	43
Source 1: NOAA
Source 2: Deutscher Wetterdienst (humidity, 1971–1979)

== See also ==
- Provinces of Saudi Arabia
- List of governorates of Saudi Arabia
- List of cities and towns in Saudi Arabia
