= Faisal bin Khalid Al Saud (born 1973) =

Saudi Arabian royal and politician

Faisal bin Khalid bin Sultan Al Saud

4th Governor of the Northern Borders Province
- In office 22 April 2017 – present
- Appointed by: King Salman
- Monarch: Salman
- Preceded by: Mishal bin Abdullah

Personal details
- Born: 10 July 1973 (age 53) Taif, Saudi Arabia
- Spouses: Princess Mudawi; Princess Sara (m. 2013)
- Children: Princess Deem; Princess Lulwa; Prince Khalid; Princess Lin; Princess Nouf; Prince Sultan
- Parents: Khalid bin Sultan (father); Lulwa bint Fahd bin Abdulaziz (mother)
- Education: King Saud University, University of Massachusetts

Faisal bin Khalid bin Sultan Al Saud (Arabic: فيصل بن خالد بن سلطان آل سعود) is a Saudi Arabian royal and politician. He has served as the 4th governor of the Northern Borders Province since 22 April 2017. Faisal is the son of former deputy defense minister Khalid bin Sultan and the grandson of former Crown Prince of Saudi Arabia Sultan bin Abdulaziz.

== Early life and education ==
Faisal was born to Khalid bin Sultan, former deputy minister of defense, and Lulwa bint Fahd, a daughter of King Fahd, who died in April 2022. He is also the grandson of Crown Prince Sultan.

Faisal earned a bachelor's degree in political science from King Saud University. He later attended Basic Underwater Demolition/US SEAL (BUD/S) training at Naval Amphibious Base Coronado, graduating with BUD/S class 189. He subsequently received a master's degree with honors in international affairs from the University of Massachusetts in Boston, United States.

== Career ==
In 2006, Faisal was appointed as an advisor to the Crown Prince's Court. Ten years later, in 2016, King Salman issued an order appointing him as an adviser at the Royal Court. On 22 April 2017, King Salman appointed him as the governor of the Northern Borders Province with the rank of minister. He succeeded Mishal bin Abdullah in the position.

== See also ==
- Northern Borders Province
- House of Saud
