= Tarafiyah =

Tarafiyah الطرفية
- Location in Saudi Arabia
- Coordinates: 26.3645784°N 43.9762473°E
- Country: Saudi Arabia
- Region: Al-Qassim Region

Population (2010)
  - Total: 3,040

Tarafiyah (Arabic: الطرفية) is a city in Al-Qassim Region, Saudi Arabia. It was the site of the Battle of Tarafiyah (1907). As of 2010, It has 3040 inhabitants.
