= Battle of Unaizah (1904) =

- Part of Saudi–Rashidi War
- Location of Unaizah, Saudi Arabia
Date	March 1904
Location	Unaizah, Qassim region, Arabia
Result	Emirate of Nejd victory

Belligerents
Emirate of Ha'il Supported by: Ottoman Empire	Emirate of Riyadh

Commanders and leaders
Abdul-Aziz bin Mitab	Abdulaziz Ibn Saud

Casualties and losses
370 killed	2 killed

The Battle of Unaizah (Arabic: معركة عنيزة) took place during the early stage of the Saudi-Rashidi War. Abdulaziz captured Unaizah (Anaiza) in March 1904, killing 370 while losing only two men.
