= Rafha Domestic Airport =

Airport in Saudi Arabia

Rafha Domestic Airport مطار رفحاء المحلي
- IATA: RAH; ICAO: OERF

Summary
- Airport type: Public
- Owner: General Authority of Civil Aviation
- Operator: General Authority of Civil Aviation
- Serves: Rafha Governorate
- Location: Rafha, Northern Borders Province, Saudi Arabia
- Opened: 1962; 64 years ago
- Elevation AMSL: 1,474 ft / 449 m
- Coordinates: 29°37′34.8″N 043°29′26.5″E

Map
- Location of airport in Saudi Arabia

Runways
| Direction | Length | | Surface |
| Direction | m | ft | Surface |
|---|---|---|---|
| 11/29 | 3,000 | 9,843 | Asphalt |

Rafha Domestic Airport (IATA: RAH, ICAO: OERF) is an airport serving Rafha Governorate in the Northern Borders Province of Saudi Arabia.

== Facilities ==
The airport resides at an elevation of 1,474 feet (449 m) above mean sea level. It has one runway designated 11/29 with an asphalt surface measuring 3,000 by 45 metres (9,843 ft × 148 ft).

== Airlines and destinations ==
Airlines offering scheduled passenger service:

| Airlines | Destinations |
|---|---|
| Nesma Airlines | Hail |
| Saudia | Jeddah, Riyadh |

== See also ==
- Transport in Saudi Arabia
- List of airports in Saudi Arabia
