= First Saudi–Rashidi War (1903–1907) =

Conflict in the unification of Saudi Arabia

- Part of Unification of Saudi Arabia
Date	1903–1907
Location	Qassim region, Arabia
Result	Saudi victory

Belligerents
Emirate of Ha'il; Ottoman Empire	Emirate of Riyadh: Otaibah tribe; Mutayr tribe

Commanders and leaders
Abdul-Aziz bin Mitab † (Ottoman Empire) Shukri pasha † (Ottoman Empire) Emir Al Homoud Ibn Rashid: Abalkhail Emir of Qassim region	Ibn Saud; Ibrahim bin Aqeel †; Muhammad ibn Abdullah Aba al Khail †; Dulaym ibn Baraak †; Sultan bin Bajad; Faisal al-Duwaish

Strength
20,000–25,000 (Ottoman Empire) 8 battalions	10,000–12,000

Casualties and losses
~At least 2,570 casualties	~At least 1,037 casualties
- ~At least 3,607 total^{[a]}

The Saudi–Rashidi War of 1903–1907, also referred to as the First Saudi–Rashidi War or the Battles over Qasim, was a conflict between Saudi loyalist forces of the newborn Emirate of Riyadh and the Emirate of Ha'il (Jabal Shammar), supported by the Rashidis. The pro-Ottoman Rashidis were supported by 8 battalions of Ottoman infantry. The majority of the war was fought out in around half a dozen sporadic battles, ending with a Saudi takeover of the al-Qassim region following their decisive victory at Qassim on April 13, 1906, though additional engagements followed in 1907.

== Casualties ==
Saudi–Rashidi War (combined 2,607+ casualties):

- Battle of Unaizah (1904) - 372 killed.
- Battle of Buraidah - unknown.
- Battle of Bekeriyah (1904) - 2,200 killed.
- Battle of Shinanah (1904) - unknown.
- Battle of Rawdat Muhanna (1906) - 35+ killed.
- Battle of Tarafiyah (1907) - unknown.
