= Turaif Domestic Airport =

Airport in Saudi Arabia

Turaif Domestic Airport مطار طريف المحلي
- IATA: TUI; ICAO: OETR

Summary
- Airport type: Public
- Owner: General Authority of Civil Aviation
- Operator: General Authority of Civil Aviation
- Serves: Turaif Governorate
- Location: Turaif, Northern Borders Province, Saudi Arabia
- Opened: 1979; 47 years ago
- Elevation AMSL: 2,803 ft (854 m)
- Coordinates: 31°41′33″N 038°43′52″E

Map
- Location of airport in Saudi Arabia

Runways
Direction	Length		Surface
Direction	m	ft	Surface
10/28	3,000	9,843	Asphalt

Turaif Domestic Airport (IATA: TUI, ICAO: OETR) is an airport serving Turaif Governorate in the Northern Borders Province of Saudi Arabia.

== Facilities ==
The airport resides at an elevation of 2,803 feet (854 m) above mean sea level. It has one runway designated 10/28 with an asphalt surface measuring 3,000 by 45 metres (9,843 ft × 148 ft).

== Airlines and destinations ==
Airlines offering scheduled passenger service:

Airlines	Destinations
Nesma Airlines	Hail
Saudia	Dammam, Jeddah, Riyadh

== See also ==
- Transport in Saudi Arabia
- List of airports in Saudi Arabia
