= Faisal bin Mishaal Al Saud =

Saudi royal, politician, and writer (born 1959)

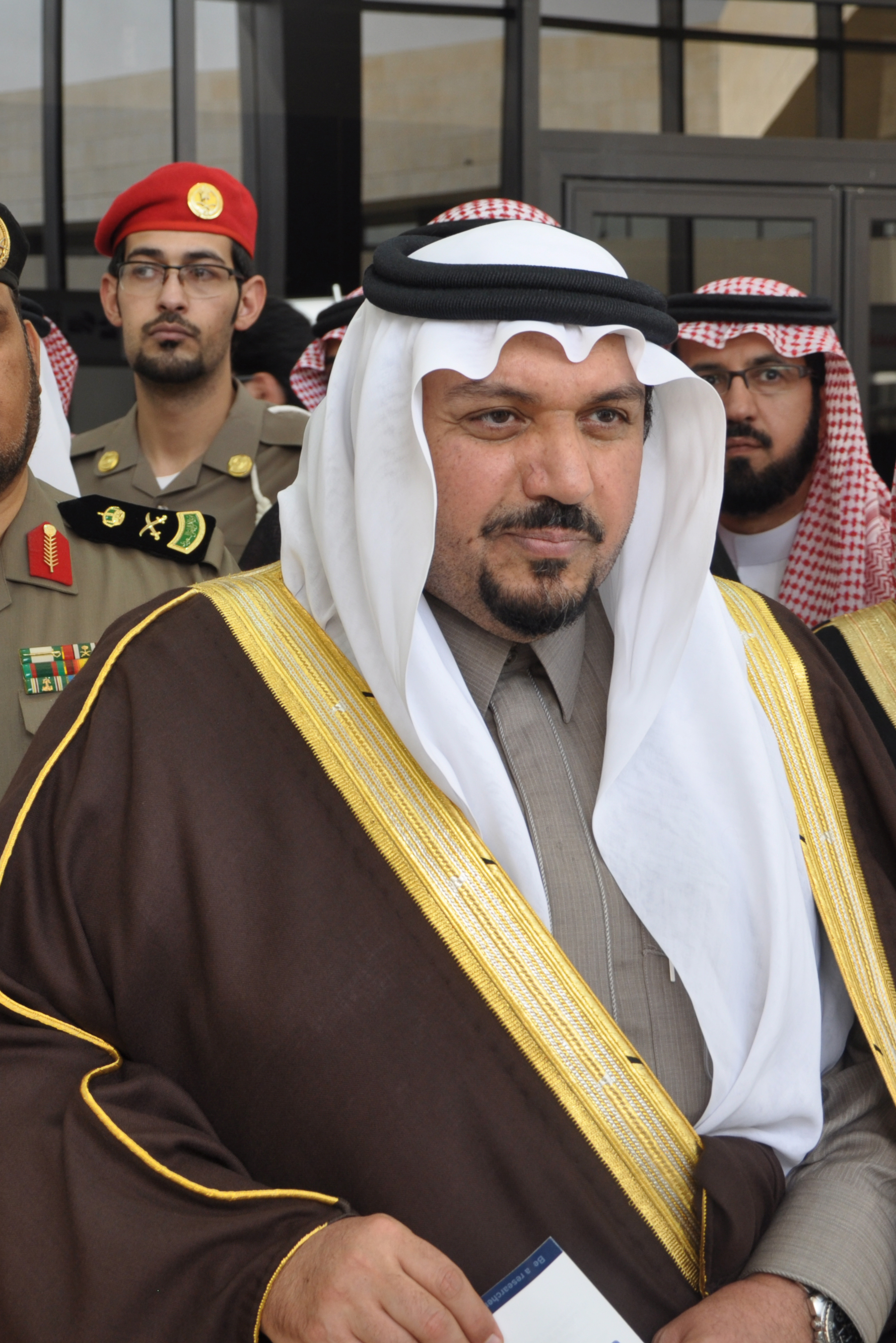
- Prince Faisal in 2012

Governor of Al Qassim province
- Incumbent
- Assumed office 29 January 2015
- Monarch: King Salman
- Preceded by: Faisal bin Bandar

Personal details
- Born: 1959 (age 66–67)
- Parents: Mishaal bin Saud (father); Fawzia bint Mohammed bin Abdullah Al Qahtani (mother)
- Education: King Saud University; Durham University
- House: Al Saud

Faisal bin Mishaal Al Saud (Arabic: فيصل بن مشعل آل سعود; born 1959) is a Saudi Arabian politician and writer who has served as the governor of Al-Qassim Region since 29 January 2015. He is the eldest son of Prince Mishaal bin Saud Al Saud, a grandson of King Saud and a great-grandson of King Abdulaziz.

== Early life and education ==
Prince Faisal was born in Riyadh in 1959. He received a bachelor's degree in political science in 1982 from King Saud University and his doctorate degree in political science in 2000 from Durham University.

== Career ==
Immediately after graduating from the university Prince Faisal joined the Ministry of Defense management cooperation and foreign aid in 1982. Moved to work in the form of intelligence and security of the armed forces in the Ministry of Defense in 1984. He served as an adviser for defense minister's office in 1988. In 2006, a royal decree appointed Faisal as deputy governor of Al-Qassim Region.

On 29 January 2015, he was appointed governor of the Al Qassim Region at the rank of minister, succeeding Prince Faisal bin Bandar Al Saud, who was appointed governor of Riyadh region.
