= Al Bukayriyah =

Bukayriyah البكيرية
- Location in Saudi Arabia
- Coordinates: 26.161984°N 43.654683°E
- Country: Saudi Arabia
- Region: Al-Qassim Province

Population (2018)
  - Total: 25,153

Al-Bukayriyah, located in Najd, central Saudi Arabia, in the heart of Al-Qassim Province southwest of the city of Buraidah, 36 km away, and about fifteen kilometers west of Al-Qassim Airport, about thirty kilometers away from Onaizah, about thirty kilometers to the east, and from behind it Al-Badaa'ah by about fifteen kilometers, and from the west by experts and from Behind it is the Ryad al-Khabara and al-Rass, and from the north of al-Shehiya, and behind it, Ayyun al-Jawa, about twenty-five kilometers from al-Bukayriyah, and in the northwest al-Fuwailiq, and below Mount Saq. These countries are considered to be Bukayriyah's neighbors

== Climate ==
Al-Bukayriyah is part of the climatic conditions found in the Najd region, which is the desert climate that is known to be very hot in summer and very cold in winter. What distinguishes Al-Bukayriyah is that the climate during the summer is less hot compared to the climate of Najd. This is due to the effect of the farms and orchards surrounding Al-Bukayriyah, as they contribute to tempering of the temperatures in the summer. Since many farms are located in the heart of Al-Bukayriyah and its near ends, they soften the temperatures due to moisture as the density of vegetation causes moderate temperatures in summer. Also, rain falls on Al Bukayriyah in winter due to the western winds.

== Inception ==
When the waters of al-Dhalafa ', northwest of the Mulaida region, came after the middle of the twelfth century AH, its people, the majority of whom were from the Areenat from the Subay tribe, were dispersed, leaving their properties and homes except for a few of them who had enough in their wells close to the well of palm trees or greenery, and they were those whose wells were in A depression from the ground in the northeast of Rawdat al-Dhalafa ', at a site known as al-Rjimiya. Among them is Othman bin Imran Al-Arini, who is the grandfather of (the family of Dakhil Allah, Al Khudair, Al Omair, Al Suwailem) who bought Al Bukayriyah from its owner Al Bukairi, so they built it and settled there. The boundaries of Al-Bukayriyah are as follows: from the northwest, starting from Jabal Saq, heading east to the continent of the ancestors, in Fasal, until it turns southeast to Asda, west of the town of Laayoune, and south of Hilaliya and Wadi al-Ramah from the southeast, and from the west, starting from Rawda Saq, heading south, then the continent of Hasani to Al-Hazm, known as Al-Ubaid, is the boundary between the experts and Al-Bukayriyah, and it is fixed with the same boundaries and borders from the east, starting from the south at Al-Suaibiyya in the far southeast of Ghamis Al-Bukayriyah, heading north along the stretch of Irq Bin Omairah, in the center of which is the well-known Qalib Al-Rajhi. The eastern border extends to the north until it reaches the dribbling horse, now known as the diphtheria donkey. Then it heads north to the west of Ayyun al-Jawa. And the determination of this before the town of Shehiya is a country in itself. With the help of God and the solidarity and cooperation of the people of Al-Bukayriyah, Al-Bukayriyah became, in record time, one of the largest countries surrounding it, despite its recent inception. Among the properties of Al-Bukayriyah, and one of the battles recorded in history is the Battle of Al-Bukayriyah.

== See also ==
- List of cities and towns in Saudi Arabia
