= Abdullah bin Jalawi Al Saud =

Saudi royal (1870–1938)

Governor of Eastern Province
- In office: 1913 – 1938
- Successor: Saud bin Abdullah
- Monarch: Abdulaziz
- Born: 1870
- Died: 1938 (aged 67–68)
- Issue: List: Prince Fahd; Prince Saud; Prince Muhammad; Prince Nasir; Prince Abdulaziz; Prince Saad; Prince Abdul Muhsin; 20 others
Names
- Abdullah bin Jiluwi bin Turki
- House: Al Saud
- Father: Jiluwi bin Turki Al Saud

Abdullah bin Jiluwi Al Saud (Arabic: عبد الله بن جلوي آل سعود, romanized: ʿAbd Allāh ibn Jalawī Āl Suʿūd; 1870–1938) was one of the early Saudi governors.

== Biography ==
Abdullah bin Jiluwi was born in 1870. He was the grandson of the founder of the Second Saudi State, Turki bin Abdullah, and the son of Jiluwi bin Turki. Abdullah was a close companion of Abdulaziz bin Abdul Rahman, founder and first king of the modern Saudi Arabia. He was Abdulaziz's first cousin once removed, being a cousin of Abdulaziz's father Abdul Rahman bin Faisal.

Abdullah bin Jiluwi accompanied his cousin Abdul Rahman bin Faisal in exile to Kuwait after the family's retreat from the capital at Riyadh. Abdullah bin Jiluwi was a principal supporter in the raid on the Masmak Castle on 15 January 1902 which resulted in the recovery of Riyadh by Abdulaziz. He killed Ajlan Al Shammar, the Rashidi governor, and saved the life of Abdulaziz in the battle for the fortress. In addition, he was Abdulaziz's deputy commander and assisted him in capturing the Eastern Province in 1913.

As the Saudi state was founded and consolidated, Abdullah bin Jiluwi was first appointed governor of Al Ahsa and then of Al Qassim Province. As governor of Al Ahsa, Abdullah had clashes with Ikhwan due to their moral vigilantism, which he considered a serious threat to the order. Next he was transferred to the Eastern province (then known as Al Hasa province) because Abdullah bin Jiluwi could not claim the succession and Abdulaziz's sons were not old enough to assume this responsibility. Abdullah was the second most powerful member of the Al Saud during this time after Abdulaziz himself.

The province was ruled sternly and became almost a semi-independent family fiefdom. When Abdullah died in 1938, his son Saud succeeded him as governor. Saud bin Abdullah served as governor from 1938 to 1967. Another son of Abdullah, Abdul Muhsin, served as the governor of the province from 1967 to 1985, when King Fahd appointed his own son Muhammad to the post.

== Personal life and death ==
Abdullah bin Jiluwi died in 1938 and one of his spouses, Wasmiyah Al Damir, became one of the numerous wives of King Abdulaziz. They had no child from this marriage. Abdullah also wed a woman from the Al Subai tribe. His eldest son, Fahd, was killed by the Ajman tribe in May 1929 following the murder of Ajman tribe leader Dhaydan bin Hithlain.
