= Arrar =

Arrar is a small village in Chakwal District, Punjab, Pakistan. This village is part of Chakwal Tehsil and located between Kallar Kahar and Choa Saiden Shah. It has a government school up to primary level. To the east of Arrar is the village Lilyandi, and to the north Dharyala Kahoon.
