= Azienda Rilievo Alienazione Residuati =

Italian state enterprise

The Azienda Rilievo Alienazione Residuati (ARAR) was the body to which the Italian National Unity Government formed after the Second World War entrusted the task of selling the goods and war materials confiscated from the enemy or war surplus material abandoned by the allied army in order to make it easier to return home.

Prime Minister Ferruccio Parri formed ARAR on 29 October 1945, placing it under the direction of economist Ernesto Rossi, who would also be confirmed by Alcide De Gasperi, remaining at the helm of the institution until the end of its activities, concluded January 2, 1958.
