= Battle of Shinanah (1904) =

Battle of the Saudi–Rashidi War

Coordinates: 25.8128°N 43.4463°E

- Part of Saudi–Rashidi War
- Location of Shinanah, Saudi Arabia
Date	29 September 1904
Location	Shinanah, Qassim region, Arabia
Result	Emirate of Riyadh victory

Belligerents
Al Rashid; Ottoman Empire	Emirate of Riyadh: 'Utaybah tribe

Commanders and leaders
Abdulaziz bin Mitab	Abdulaziz Ibn Saud

Strength
25,000	10,000

Casualties and losses
Unknown	Unknown

The Battle of Shinanah was a major battle of the Saudi–Rashidi War, during the Unification of Saudi Arabia campaign, between the Rashidi dynasty and Saudi rebels. It occurred on 29 September 1904, in the town of Shinanah in Qassim region. After Ibn Saud's victory in Battle of Bekeriyah, he planned to conquer the whole Qassim region. Ibn Rashid also planned to regain control of the region. The battle ended in a Saudi victory, Ibn Saud gained extensive Turkish supplies in the town. Ibn Rashid and his Ottoman allies were forced to retreat to Rawdat Muhanna.
