= Battle of Tarafiyah (1907) =

Coordinates: 26.3645784°N 43.9762473°E

- Part of Saudi–Rashidi War
- Location of Tarafiyah, Saudi Arabia.
| Date | 24 September 1907 |
| Location | Tarafiyah, Qassim region, Arabia |
| Result | Emirate of Riyadh victory |

Belligerents
| Al Rashid; Mutayr; Rebel Qassim region Ottoman Empire | Emirate of Riyadh; Otaibah tribe |

Commanders and leaders
| Sultan bin Hamoud Al Rashid; Faisal al-Dawish (Mutayr tribe); Muhammad Abdullah Abalkhail Emir of Qassim region. | Abdulaziz Ibn Saud |

Strength
| 12,000 | 10,000 |

Casualties and losses
| Unknown | Unknown |

The Battle of Tarafiyah (Arabic: معركة الطَّرَفِيَّة) was a major battle of the Saudi–Rashidi War, during the Unification of Saudi Arabia, fought between the Rashidi dynasty and Saudi rebels in the town of Tarafiyah in Qassim region. The battle took place on 24 September 1907 and resulted in a Saudi victory.

== Background ==
After the execution of Abalkhail's cousin, Emir of Qassim, Abalkhail planned to take revenge from his king, Ibn Saud. Abalkhail re-allied again with the Rashidis, the traditional enemies of Ibn Saud. Abalkhail also made an alliance with Faisal Al-Duwaish, leader of the Mutayr clan and the Ikhwan forces, who used to aid Ibn Saud forces in his former battles. Ibn Saud met the allied forces in the battle of Tarafiyah.

Ibn Saud was supported by elements of the Otaibah tribe.
