= Mishal AlMarzouqi =

Emarati inventor

- مشعل المرزوقي
- Education: Higher Colleges of Technology; Hamdan Bin Mohammed Smart University; New York University Abu Dhabi
- Occupations: Mechatronics engineer, inventor
- Website: mmr.ae

Mishal AlMarzouqi is an Emirati mechatronics engineer and innovator. He is the first international arbitrator in the Middle East specializing in the field of Mechatronics.

== Education ==
AlMarzouqi studied mechatronics engineering at the Higher Colleges of Technology (HCT) in Dubai and obtained his bachelor's degree in 2013, graduating with distinction. He obtained a Master of Management in Entrepreneurial Leadership and a Master of Science in Innovation and Change Management from Hamdan Bin Mohammed Smart University, and is a graduate of the Mohamed bin Zayed Program for Distinguished Students from New York University Abu Dhabi.

== Career ==
Following graduation, AlMarzouqi joined the Abu Dhabi National Energy Company (TAQA) as an asset management associate. After 3 years at TAQA, he transitioned to Taweelah Asia Power Company (TAPCO) as the Deputy Technical Projects Advisor. He currently serves as the director of research and development (R&D) at Eanan, the first manufacturing company for UAVs in Dubai, where he leads the development of drone technologies and advanced air mobility solutions.

In 2014, he launched the Dubai based Strada Parfumerie creating bespoke fragrances for private clients including the Royal Family, and by 2018, started offering perfumes for the public. AlMarzouqi, Sultan Al Ameri and Ibrahim Al Hedidi founded Edison Media Production, a media production company specializing in smart media. AlMarzouqi founded the Mishal AlMarzouqi Artificial Intelligence Consulting Company, and established AlBait Art boutiques, an online store promoting products that embody Emirati culture.

In 2018, AlMarzouqi co-founded The Futurist with Rashid AlMazroui, a venture dedicated to creating innovative Emirati technological products. The Futurist team consists of 15 specialists and operates in 8 different technical fields, with its headquarters located at the Youth Center in Dubai. In 2019, with Ahmed Al Hashimi and Khaled Belhoul, he co-founded Signature Yashmagh, an apparel brand headquartered in Dubai.

During his career, AlMarzouqi presented several innovations, including a drone that provides solutions such as tire repair and battery recharge for stranded travelers, and inventing a smart helmet that helps people with disabilities by converting neural signals into actionable commands, allowing them to interact with their environment more seamlessly.

== Awards and recognitions ==
In 2009, he won the Falak Tayyeb Award for developing a training simulation device for the Dubai Metro to train the metro employees. In the same year, he was named the Man of the Year by Dubai Men's College, and came in second place in the Al Owais Award for Creativity and Scientific Innovation.

In 2012, AlMarzouqi achieved second place in the Emirates Skills Competition in the Mechatronics category, while studying at the Higher Colleges of Technology in Dubai, which qualified him to participate in the World Skills Competition that was held in 2013 in Germany.

In 2015, AlMarzouqi won first place in the Gulf Youth Award for his Dream Factory project, and received the Abu Dhabi Industry and Emirates National Achievement Awards for his innovative drone designed for medical supply delivery. In 2016, 4 years after serving as a judge in the Emirates Skills Competition, he became the first international judge in the Middle East specializing in mechatronics engineering.

== Published works ==
- Al Marzouqi, Mishal. Mechatronics From an Emirati Perspective. ISBN 9789948232490..
