= Mishaal bin Abdullah Al Saud (born 1970) =

Saudi royal and former governor (born 1970)

Governor of Makkah Region
- In office 22 December 2013 – 29 January 2015
- Appointed by: King Abdullah
- Preceded by: Khalid bin Faisal
- Succeeded by: Khalid bin Faisal

Governor of the Najran Province
- In office 1 April 2009 – 22 December 2013
- Appointed by: King Abdullah
- Preceded by: Mishaal bin Saud
- Succeeded by: Jiluwi bin Abdulaziz Al Saud

Personal details
- Born: 25 November 1970 (age 55) Riyadh
- Spouses: Luluwah bint Nawaf bin Mohammed bin Abdullah bin Abdul Rahman Al Saud (divorced); Muneerah Albawardi; Nouf bint Bandar Al Saud
- Parents: King Abdullah (father); Tathi bint Mishan Al Faisal Al Jarba (mother)
- Education: King Saud University
- House: Al Saud

Mishaal bin Abdullah Al Saud (Arabic: مشعل بن عبدالله بن عبدالعزيز آل سعود; born 25 November 1970) is a Saudi prince, diplomat, and politician. Mishaal is a son of former King Abdullah and one of the grandsons of Saudi Arabia's founder King Abdulaziz. He served as the governor of Najran Province (2009–2013) and then as the governor of Mecca Province (2013–2015).

== Early life and education ==
Prince Mishaal was born on 25 November 1970 in Riyadh. He is the sixth son of King Abdullah. His mother is Tathi bint Mishan al Faisal al Jarbah, a member of the Iraqi branch of the Shammar tribe. He has six blood siblings, including Turki bin Abdullah and Oraib bint Abdullah, wife of Salman bin Abdulaziz.

Mishaal received a Bachelor of Arts degree in political science from King Saud University in 1995. He has a PhD in political science.

== Early career ==
Mishaal bin Abdullah started his career as the director of the computer department of the National Guard, and served there from 1997 to 2003. Then, he was appointed the minister plenipotentiary with a third rank at the Ministry of Foreign Affairs on 22 August 2003.

Next, he became minister plenipotentiary at the same ministry ranked fourteenth on 12 February 2006. He was also an adviser at the Saudi royal court. In November 2006, he led Saudi Arabia's delegation to a meeting of the UN General Assembly.

== Governorship ==
Mishaal was appointed the Governor of Najran Province on 1 April 2009. It is reported that the province witnessed considerable progress following his appointment. He warned public and private agencies on 18 November 2011 that he would monitor service projects carried out in the province and take punitive action against negligent companies and officials. His appointment to Najran Province is commonly regarded as King Abdullah's positive gesture towards the Ismailis residing in the province.

Mishaal was one of the advisors of the late Crown Prince Nayef. The other two were Mohammed bin Fahd and Faisal bin Khalid.

On 22 December 2013, Mishaal was appointed governor of Mecca Province, replacing Khalid bin Faisal Al Saud in the post. He was released from this position by King Salman on 29 January 2015, six days after his father's death. Khalid bin Faisal Al Saud replaced Mishaal in the post. The latter was made an advisor to the King on the same date.

=== Reasons for his appointment as governor of Najran Province ===
In the Najran Province, the south of Saudi Arabia, the small Saudi Ismaili minority (population approximately 400,000) experienced systematic discrimination after the appointment of the highly conservative Mishaal bin Saud in 1996. During his tenure, Ismailis' religious freedoms were curtailed such as the closure of mosques, the arrest of clerics and restrictions on religious schooling for young Ismailis. As a result, the Ismailis thought that it was under siege and began to arm itself in case of an attack upon its religious leader, Da’i al-Mutlaq (the Absolute Guide), at his home in Najran. Despite the fact that the Ismailis are the majority of the population of Najran, they hold only a tiny minority of all senior government posts. Moreover, the Saudi government pursued a policy of naturalising Yemeni Sunnis from the Hadramawt region of Yemen, providing them with land plots, letting them to carry weapons and allegedly turning a blind eye to attacks upon Ismailis. This policy would appear to be remarkably short-sighted in that many of the tribes invited to live in Najran have been the most fertile recruiting ground for al-Qaeda in Yemen. Due to these negative events, tension between local authorities and the Ismaili population increased, resulting in a confrontation between armed Ismaili demonstrators and police and army units outside the Holiday Inn hotel in Najran city in April 2000.

As a result of domestic and international reactions, King Abdullah fired Mishaal bin Saud as governor of Najran Province in late 2008 and appointed his son, Prince Mishaal, in April 2009. Mishaal bin Abdullah who has acquired a reputation for his intellect and diligence in working to reduce poverty in Saudi Arabia began a programme to address the social and economic grievances of the Ismaili community, including the distribution of land to previously dispossessed Ismailis.

== Controversy and detention ==
On 27 March 2012, Mishaal bin Abdullah was reported to ask the ministry of culture and information to investigate the programs of a satellite TV channel which allegedly provoked sectarianism and harmed the national unity due to the fact that the channel aired a program that allegedly aimed to divide the residents of the region along sectarian lines. A speaker on the related TV channel made negative comments against the people of Najran Province along sectarian lines. Upon his request, an investigation was started. Then Saudi minister of culture and information, Abdul Aziz Khoja, declared that such provocations of sectarianism were against national unity and cannot be tolerated.

In November 2017, Mishaal bin Abdullah was detained together with other senior members of the royal family. They were held at Ritz-Carlton hotel in Riyadh. He was released in December 2017 following the undisclosed financial settlement with the Saudi government.

== Personal life ==
Prince Mishaal married Luluwah bint Nawaf bin Mohammed bin Abdullah bin Abdulrahman Al Saud in January 2009. He secondly married Princess Nouf bint Bandar bin Abdullah Al Saud on 10 May 2012, and has twin daughters, Seeta and Mashael. Prince Mishaal is an honorary member of Al-Hilal FC.
