= Muhammad bin Abdulaziz Al Saud =

Saudi royal and politician (1908–1988)

- Muhammad bin Abdulaziz Al Saud with his paternal cousin, Mohammed bin Saud Al Kabir

Crown Prince of Saudi Arabia
- Tenure: 2 November 1964 – 29 March 1965
- Predecessor: Faisal bin Abdulaziz
- Successor: Khalid bin Abdulaziz
- Monarch: Faisal

Governor of Al Madinah Province
- Tenure: December 1925–1954
- Predecessor: Office established
- Successor: Abdul Muhsin bin Abdulaziz
- Monarch: Abdulaziz; Saud; Faisal
- Born: 4 March 1908; Riyadh, Emirate of Riyadh
- Died: 25 November 1988 (aged 80); Riyadh, Saudi Arabia
- Burial: 25 November 1988; Al Oud cemetery, Riyadh
- Spouse: Sara bint Saad bin Abdul Rahman Al Saud
- Issue: 8
Names
- Muhammad bin Abdulaziz bin Abdul Rahman
- House: Al Saud
- Father: King Abdulaziz
- Mother: Al Jawhara bint Musaed Al Jiluwi
- Occupation: Politician; businessman; philanthropist

Muhammad bin Abdulaziz Al Saud (Arabic: محمد بن عبد العزيز آل سعود Muḥammad bin ʿAbdulʿazīz Āl Saʿūd; 4 March 1908 – 25 November 1988) was the crown prince of Saudi Arabia from 1964 to 1965 and the nominal governor of Al Madinah Province from 1925 to 1954. He resigned as crown prince in order to pave the way for his brother Khalid bin Abdulaziz to become the heir apparent. Prince Muhammad was one of the wealthiest and most powerful members of the House of Saud. His advice was sought and deferred to in all matters by his brothers.

Prince Muhammad was a son of King Abdulaziz and Al Jawhara bint Musaed Al Jiluwi. He often played a role in his father's campaigns which resulted in the formation of the Kingdom of Saudi Arabia. He opposed the appointment of his elder half-brother Saud as the crown prince of Saudi Arabia. Prince Muhammad was the acting viceroy of Hejaz in 1932 during the absence of the viceroy Faisal bin Abdulaziz (later king), another of his half-brothers, from the country. The royal family council, under the leadership of Prince Muhammad, deposed King Saud and placed Faisal on the throne in 1964.

After taking the throne, King Faisal nominated Prince Muhammad as crown prince, but he stepped away from the succession. His younger full brother, Prince Khalid, then became crown prince. Following the assassination of King Faisal in 1975, the members of the royal family council including Prince Muhammad proclaimed Khalid as king. Prince Muhammad was an important advisor to King Khalid. He was a traditionalist who opposed efforts at modernising Saudi Arabia in the late 1970s, believing the reforms would harm the country's traditional Islamic values. He ordered the controversial execution of his granddaughter Misha'al bint Fahd on charges of adultery in 1977. He led the family council in swearing allegiance to his younger half-brother Fahd as king upon the death of King Khalid in 1982. Six years later, Prince Muhammad died aged 80.

== Early life ==
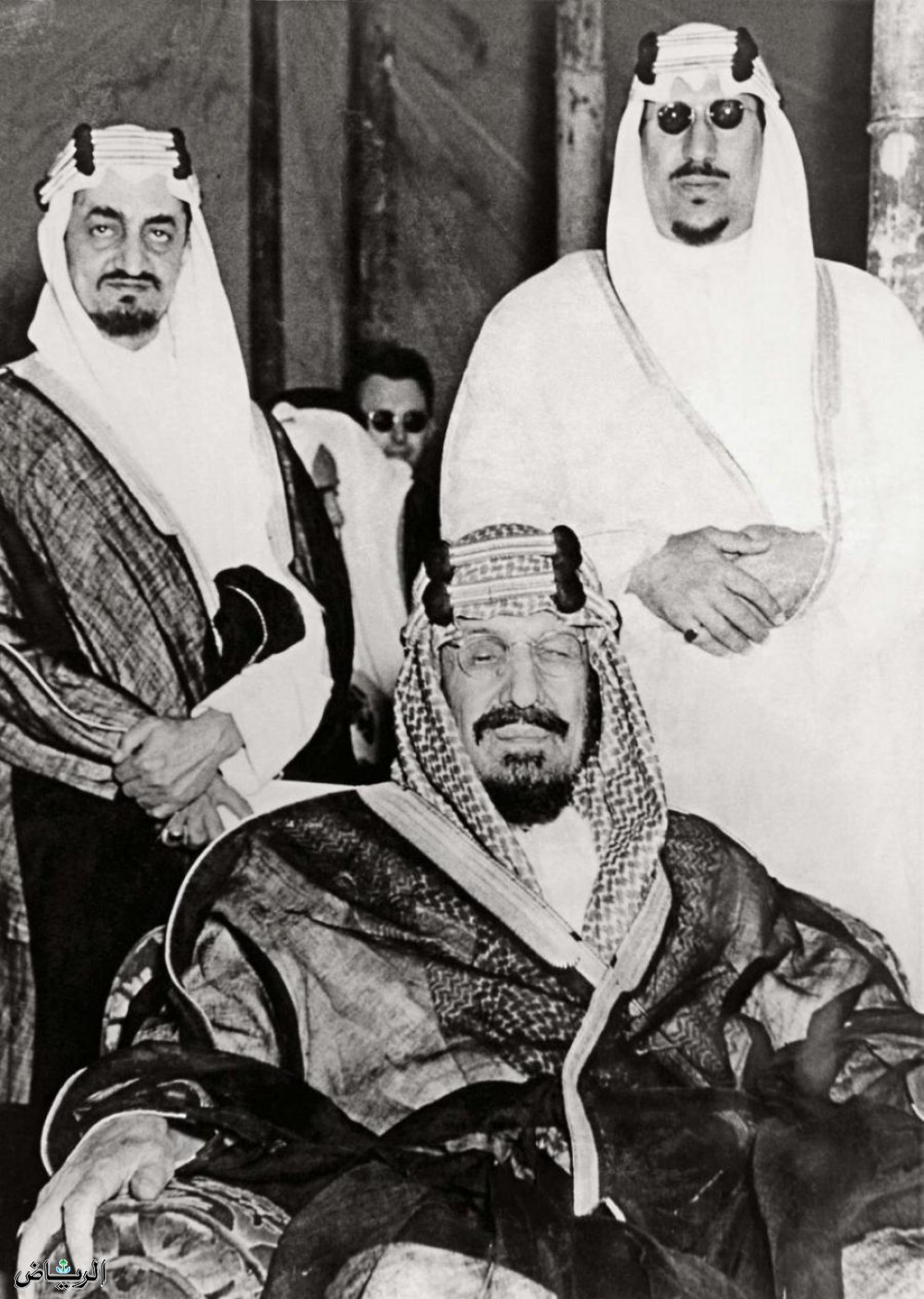
Prince Muhammad's father, Abdulaziz (seated), and older brothers Faisal (left) and Saud, who all served as kings of Saudi Arabia

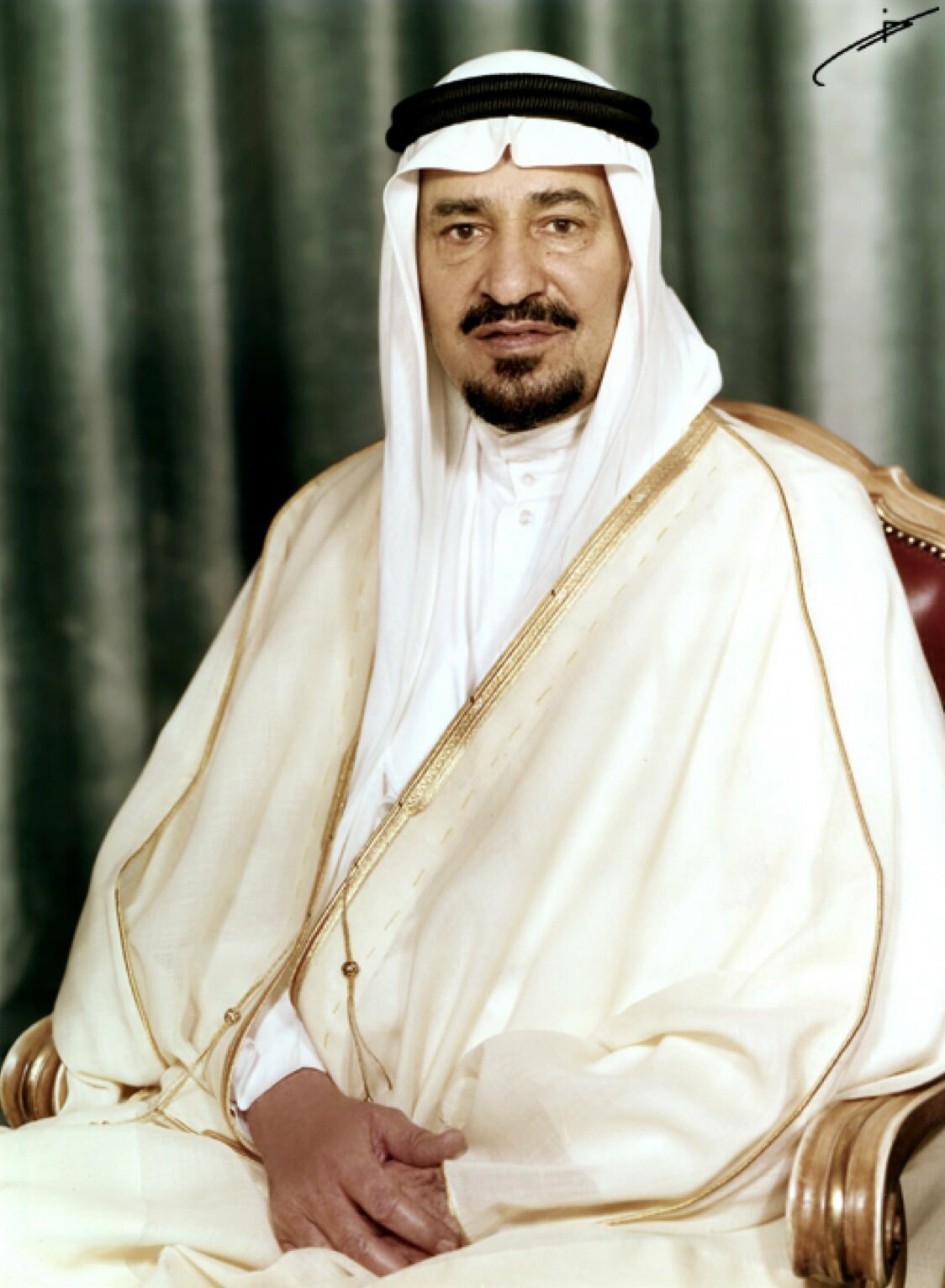
King Khalid bin Abdulaziz, Muhammad's younger brother

Prince Muhammad was the fourth son of King Abdulaziz and was born in Qasr Al Hukm, Riyadh, in 1908. His mother was Al Jawhara bint Musaed of the important Al Jiluwi family, which is a cadet branch of the Al Saud family itself. She and her husband were second cousins. Their respective fathers, Musaed bin Jiluwi and Abdul Rahman bin Faisal, were first cousins while their grandfathers, Jiluwi bin Turki and Faisal bin Turki, were brothers. This was in keeping with long-standing traditions in Arabia of marriage within the same lineage, and the members of Al Jiluwi frequently intermarried with the members of Al Saud.

Prince Muhammad was one of three children born to Al Jawhara bint Musaed and King Abdulaziz. His full brother Prince Khalid would later serve as king, and his full sister Princess Al Anoud married successively to two sons of their uncle Saad bin Abdul Rahman. First Al Anoud married Saud bin Saad. Later Saud and Al Anoud divorced, and she married his brother Fahd bin Saad.

== Royal duties ==
From an early age Prince Muhammad participated in fights during the formation years of the Kingdom with his older brothers and cousins. He and Prince Faisal were given the responsibility for the Ikhwan in mid-1920s. In December 1925 Prince Muhammad was named governor of Madinah following the conquest of the city in which he was involved. His tenure lasted until 1954.

In early 1932 Prince Muhammad was made acting viceroy of Hejaz due to the long visits of the viceroy Prince Faisal to other countries. However, he was soon replaced by Prince Khalid due to his careless administration of the region. In 1934 King Abdulaziz ordered his forces to attack Yemen's forward defences. The King sent his nephew Faisal bin Saad to Baqem and another of his nephews, Khalid bin Muhammad, to Najran and Saada. The King's son Prince Faisal assumed command of the forces on the coast of Tihama and Prince Muhammad had advanced from Najd at the head of a reserve force to support Prince Saud.

Prince Muhammad and Crown Prince Saud represented King Abdulaziz at the coronation of King George VI and Queen Elizabeth in London in 1937. Prince Muhammad and Prince Mansour accompanied their father in his meeting with US President Franklin D. Roosevelt on 14 February 1945. The King's two sons Muhammad and Mansour along with their uncle Abdullah bin Abdul Rahman attended the meeting between King Abdulaziz and British Prime Minister Winston Churchill in Egypt in February 1945. Prince Muhammad accompanied King Saud during his visit to the US in January 1962.

Prince Muhammad was known as a king-maker. He was a key prince in the coalition against King Saud. He was head of the royal family council and acted as a mediator during the dispute between King Saud and Crown Prince Faisal. He was sent to King Saud's Al Naṣariah Palace in Fall 1964 to demand his and his sons' loyalty to the chosen king, Faisal. On 28 November 1964 Radio Mecca announced the allegiance of eleven of Saud's sons to King Faisal.

== Royal advisor ==
Muhammad bin Abdulaziz was Crown Prince during the first few months (November 1964 – March 1965) of the reign of King Faisal. He then voluntarily stepped aside from the succession to allow his younger and only full brother, Prince Khalid, to become heir apparent to the Saudi throne. However, it is argued by Ayman Al Yassini that it was not a voluntarily move and that Prince Muhammad was forced to step aside from the succession by the senior members of the Al Saud family and the ulema due to his personal characteristics which were considered not to be proper for Wahhabism.

Prince Muhammad's nickname was Abu Sharayn or "the father of two evils" referring to his bad temper and his habit of drinking. In fact, his original nickname was "the father of evil" due to his aggressive and violent character during his youth which was first said by King Abdulaziz. In addition, Prince Muhammad was a frequent visitor to the parties in Beirut which he himself did not consider a proper act for a royal. All such traits were the reasons for not being selected as the king by his brothers. It is also argued that Prince Muhammad, the oldest surviving son of King Abdulaziz after Faisal, either declined the role of crown prince or was passed over because of his close association with King Saud during the latter's reign.

During the reign of King Khalid, Prince Muhammad was one of the members of the inner family council headed by the King and included his half-brothers Crown Prince Fahd, Prince Abdullah, Prince Sultan, and Prince Abdul Muhsin as well as two of his surviving uncles, Prince Ahmed and Prince Musaid. Prince Muhammad was very influential in reducing the power of the Sudairi Seven, who attempted to put to end Prince Abdullah's potential position of future crown prince. After the death of King Khalid on 13 June 1982, the royal family council led by Prince Muhammad expressed its allegiance to the new king, Fahd. Prince Muhammad died on 25 November 1988 at approximately 78 years of age and was buried in Riyadh.

=== Controversy ===
Prince Muhammad's granddaughter, Misha'al bint Fahd, was convicted of adultery in Saudi Arabia; she and her lover were sentenced to death on the explicit instructions of her grandfather, Prince Muhammad, who was a senior member of the royal family, for the alleged dishonour she brought on her clan and defying a royal order calling for her to marry a man selected by the family, and were subject to public execution. Western media criticized the event as a violation of women's rights. A British TV channel presented a dramatized documentary, Death of a Princess, which was based on this incident. The broadcast hurt Saudi–UK relations significantly.

Following the execution, segregation of women became more severe, and the religious police also began patrolling bazaars, shopping malls and any other place where men and women might happen to meet. When Prince Muhammad was later asked if the two deaths were necessary, he said, "It was enough for me that they were in the same room together".

== Wealth ==
Prince Muhammad owned various business interests. He had considerable wealth which was based on his share of the sales of crude oil. In the early 1980s his daily share was half a million barrels of oil.

== Views ==
Prince Muhammad objected to King Abdulaziz's appointment of his eldest son, Saud, as crown prince. He sent a letter to his father stating his negative views about Prince Saud's capacity to rule the state.

Following the announcement that Prince Khalid was chosen as crown prince on 29 March 1965 Radio Mecca reported a statement by Prince Muhammad: "I would rather stay away from positions and titles." Prince Muhammad later stated that he would not be a good king if he would have been chosen as the king.

Prince Muhammad led the conservative members of the royal family. They did not support the fast modernization of the society witnessed at the end of the 1970s and thought that modernization and the presence of too many foreign workers in the country would lead to the erosion of traditional Muslim values.

== Personal life ==
Muhammad bin Abdulaziz married five times to women linked to the Al Saud family. One of them was his cousin Sara, daughter of his father's brother Saad bin Abdul Rahman. Prince Muhammad also had concubines. In 1945 he allegedly had an extramarital affair with an Arab-American woman in the US, and although he denied the reports, the incident caused a conflict between Prince Muhammad and the future King Faisal.

Prince Muhammad had twenty-nine children, seventeen sons and twelve daughters. One of his daughters, Al Anoud, was the spouse of his nephew Khalid bin Saud, a son of King Saud. His eldest son, Prince Fahd, was one of the members of Al Saud Family Council established by Crown Prince Abdullah in June 2000 to discuss private issues such as business activities and marriages of younger royals to individuals who were not members of the House of Saud. One of his grandsons, Muhammad bin Abdulaziz bin Muhammad, was named deputy governor of Jizan Province in May 2017.

In the 1940s Prince Muhammad mostly resided in Riyadh and did not stay in Hejaz for long periods. He was fond of hunting with falcons and rifles. He had philanthropic activities and was the founder of many mosques in different places.

== Legacy ==
Prince Mohammad bin Abdulaziz International Airport in Medina is named after Prince Mohammed. A hospital in Riyadh, Prince Mohammed bin Abdulaziz Hospital, is also named after him. In 2014, the Saudi Ministry of Health started a medical complex in Sakakah, Al Jawf region, called Prince Mohammad bin Abdulaziz Medical City.

Saudi Arabian royalty
Preceded by Faisal	Crown Prince of Saudi Arabia; 2 November 1964 – 29 March 1965	Succeeded by Khalid
