= Mishaal bin Saud Al Saud =

Saudi royal, politician, businessman, and military officer (born 1940)

Governor of Najran Province
- In office: 1996 – November 2008
- Predecessor: Fahd bin Khalid Al Sudairi
- Successor: Mishaal bin Abdullah Al Saud
- Monarch: Fahd; Abdullah
- Born: 1940 (age 85–86)
- Spouse: Sara bint Faisal bin Turki Al Saud
Names
- Mishaal bin Saud bin Abdulaziz
- House: Al Saud
- Father: King Saud of Saudi Arabia
- Mother: Noura bint Nahar Al Mandeel

Styles of Mishaal bin Saud bin Abdul Aziz al Saud
- Reference style: His Royal Highness
- Spoken style: Your Royal Highness

Mishaal bin Saud Al Saud (Arabic: مشعل بن سعود آل سعود, romanized: Mishaʿal ibn Suʿūd Āl Suʿūd; born 1940) is a Saudi Arabian retired politician, businessman, and former military officer who served as the governor of the Najran Province from 1996 to 2008. He is a member of the House of Saud, one of the grandsons of Saudi Arabia's founder King Abdulaziz, and son of King Saud.

== Early life ==
Prince Mishaal is one of King Saud's children. His mother is Noura bint Nahar Al Mandeel.

Prince Mishaal and his brother Prince Abdul Rahman were the first sons of King Saud who declared their allegiance to King Faisal following the abdication of their father, King Saud, in November 1964. Prince Mishaal announced his allegiance to the new king on 10 November 1964.

== Career and official duties ==
Mishaal bin Saud was a military officer. He served at the national guard with the rank of brigade commander. He successfully led a national guard unit that was among the first sent to defend the northern border during the Gulf War in 1991. His military expertise provided him with an opportunity to hold the position in the Najran Province as governor.

Prince Mishaal was one of the members of Al Saud Family Council established by Crown Prince Abdullah in June 2000 to discuss private issues such as business activities of princes and marriages of princess to individuals who were not member of House of Saud. He represented his older brother Muhammed bin Saud in the council.

Prince Mishaal is the chairman of the company named Tourism Enterprises. While serving as governor of Najran Province, Mishaal also chaired the Charitable Society for Social Services in Najran.

=== Governorship ===
Mishaal bin Saud was made governor of the Najran Province in 1996. He replaced Fahd bin Khalid Al Sudairi in the post and became the first governor of the province from Al Saud family. Najran Province is border-area with Yemen. Therefore, the possibility of terror cells crossing from Yemen into Saudi Arabia is a serious threat. Tensions among the Ismaili community remained high since Prince Mishaal's arrival as governor, leading to major protests in 2000. Ismailis accused the local government of harassment, discrimination and arbitrary arrest and detention. As a result, activists from Najran petitioned King Abdullah to remove Prince Mishaal. To succeed, Mishaal bin Saud must be able to govern the local Ismaili population and maintain stability. However, Najran Province became the scene of violent clashes in 2000 when hundreds of Ismailis clashed with police. Ismailis told that it was the spur for plans to reduce their presence in the province, but that the settlement policy could provoke more social unrest. On 23 April 2000, three months after the authorities closed down their mosques on the Ismaili day of Eid al Fitr, strained relations between Ismaili Najranis and the governor, Mishaal bin Saud, came to a head over the arrest of an Ismaili cleric.

Saudi Shiites asked the authorities to decline the settlement plans of Sunni Muslim Yemenis in southern Saudi Arabia to change the demographic balance in favor of Sunnis, although they are the majority. The Ismaili Shiites of Najran said they had petitioned King Abdullah in 2006 to halt settlement of up to 10,000 Yemeni tribesmen in housing projects built for them on the surrounding area of Najran city.

A protest letter sent in January 2008 to the Governor Mishaal bin Saud complained of marginalisation and said plans to settle another Yemeni tribe must stop. "We received assurances that some issues might be resolved, but others will take time," said Mohammed Al Askar, an Ismaili activist involved in drawing up the petition.

Prince Mishaal's term was last renewed in April 2005. On 4 November 2008, King Abdullah issued a royal decree relieving Mishaal bin Saud from his duties as governor reportedly at his own request. However, it was commonly believed that he was removed from office for his inability to maintain positive relations with the Ismaili community.

In other words, Mishaal bin Saud was relieved of his duties in November 2008 partly due to his inability to eliminate or at least, reduce tensions among the Ismailis in the province. On the other hand, as a result of increased violence across the border in Yemen as well as tensions between the Yemeni and Saudi governments, a secure and stable Najran province is all the more critical to the Kingdom. Mishaal ruled the province during a time of rapid deterioration in the relationship between the majority Ismaili residents and the provincial authorities. Eventually, Mishaal bin Abdullah Al Saud, son of King Abdullah, replaced him as the governor of the province in March 2009.

== Personal life ==
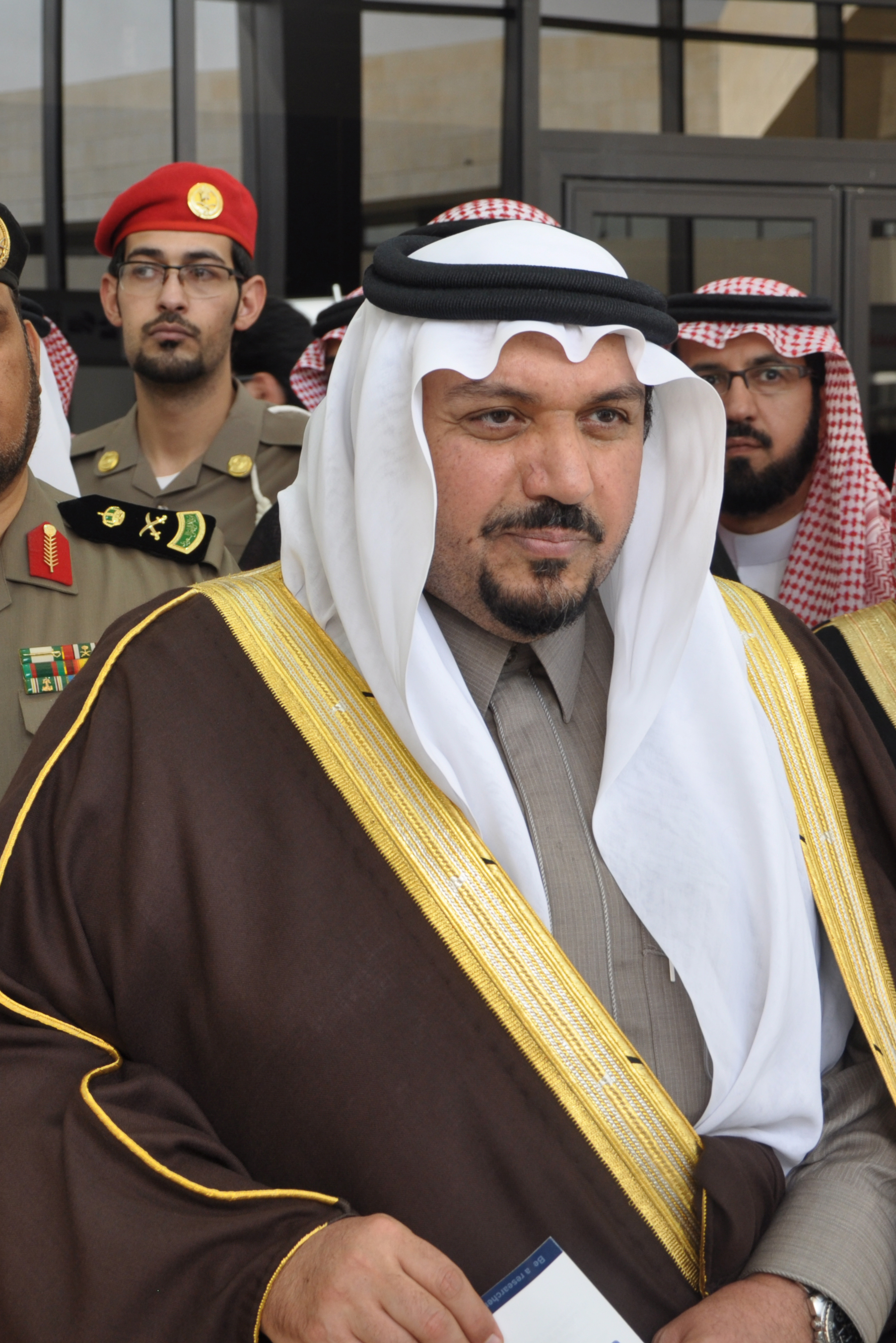
Faisal bin Mishaal, the eldest son of Prince Mishaal bin Saud

Mishaal bin Saud is son-in-law of Sultan bin Abdulaziz. He also married Princess Sara who is his first cousin once removed and a daughter of Faisal bin Turki. He has six children, five sons and a daughter.

- Prince Faisal bin Mishaal
- Prince Khalid
- Princess Lamia who married Prince Ahmed bin Salman in 1986. She has four daughters and a son.
- Prince Nawaf
- Prince Abdulaziz
- Prince Fahd who is the chairman of Saudi Aviation Association since March 2018 and also, of the GCC Aviation Association.
