= Iraqi Airways Flight 163 =

1986 aircraft hijacking and crash

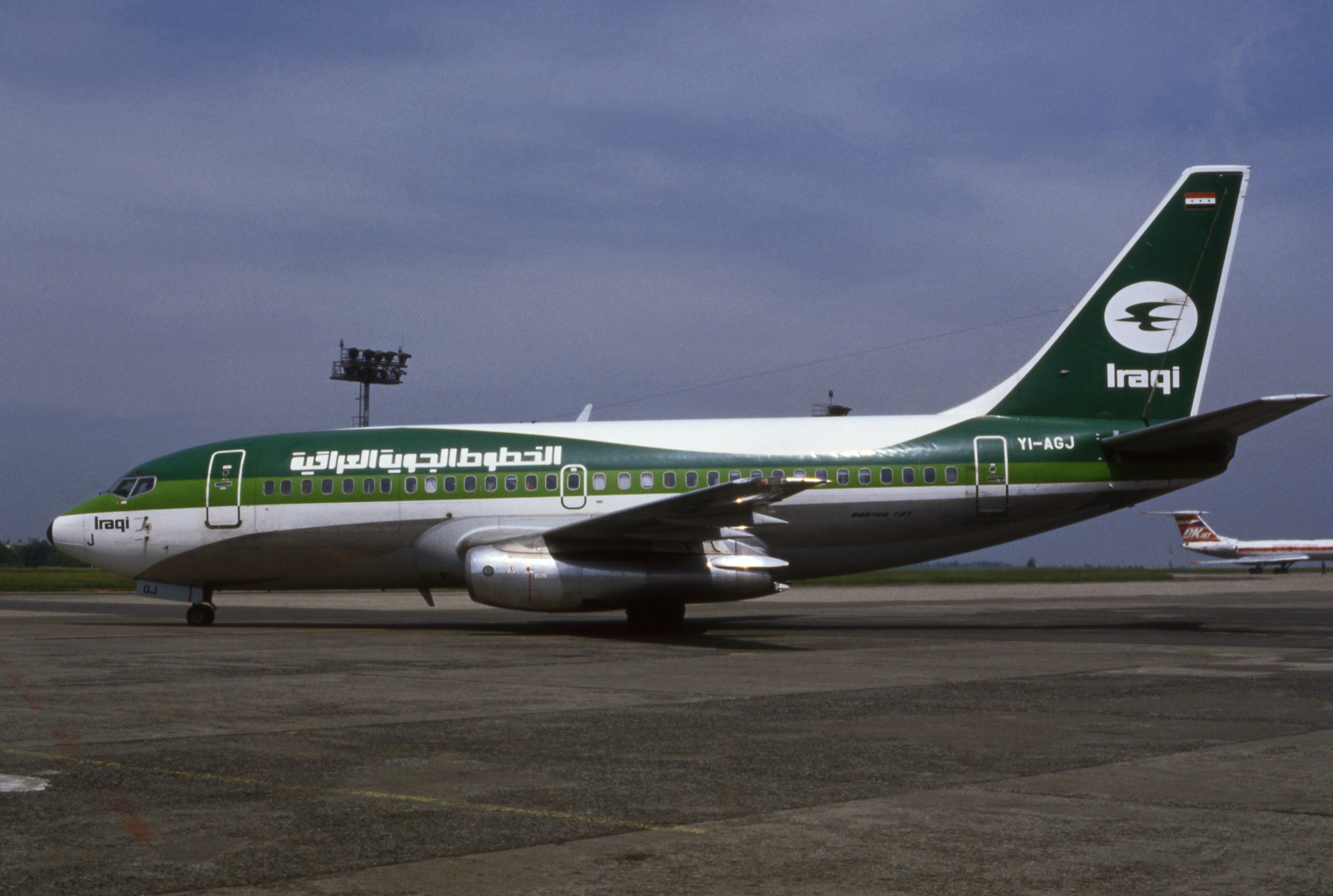
- YI-AGJ, the Iraqi Airways Boeing 737 involved

Hijacking
- Date: 25 December 1986
- Summary: Hijacking, explosion in cockpit leading to crash
- Site: Arar Domestic Airport, Arar, Saudi Arabia

Aircraft
- Aircraft type: Boeing 737-270C
- Operator: Iraqi Airways
- Call sign: IRAQI 163
- Registration: YI-AGJ
- Flight origin: Saddam International Airport; Baghdad, Iraq
- Destination: Queen Alia International Airport; Amman, Jordan
- Occupants: 106
- Passengers: 91
- Crew: 15
- Fatalities: 63
- Injuries: 35
- Survivors: 43

Iraqi Airways Flight 163 was a Boeing 737-200, registered YI-AGJ, that was hijacked in 1986. On 25 December 1986, en route from Baghdad's Saddam International Airport to Amman, Jordan, Flight 163 was hijacked by four men. Iraqi Airways security personnel tried to stop the hijackers, but a hand grenade was detonated in the passenger cabin, forcing the crew to initiate an emergency descent. Another hand grenade exploded in the cockpit, causing the aircraft to crash near Arar, Saudi Arabia, where it broke in two and caught fire.

There were 106 people on board, and 60 passengers and 3 crew members died. The pilots who survived, and the surviving passengers were able to tell authorities what transpired on the aircraft. The hijacking was one of the deadliest ever and was one of many in 1985 and 1986.

Shortly after the hijacking, the pro-Iranian group Islamic Jihad Organization (a widely used name for Hezbollah) claimed responsibility. One of the dead hijackers was later identified by the Central Intelligence Agency as a Lebanese national named Ribal Khalil Jallul, whose passport photo was matched to a Hezbollah martyr poster found near a mosque in Beirut. Iraq accused Iran of being behind the attack.

The incident resulted in some Iraqi Airways flights banning carry on luggage.

== See also ==
- Air Vietnam Flight 706
- Avianca Flight 203
- Aviation safety
- Cubana de Aviación Flight 455
- List of aircraft hijackings
