= Northern Borders Province =

Province of Saudi Arabia

Northern Borders Province منطقة الحدود الشمالية
- Province
- Map of Saudi Arabia with the Northern Borders Province highlighted
- Coordinates: 30°0′N 41°0′E
- Country: Saudi Arabia
- Region: Badiyat al-Sham
- Seat: Arar City
- Governorates: 3

Government
  - Type: Municipality
  - Body: Northern Borders Municipality
  - Governor: Faisal bin Khalid

Area
  - Total: 111,797 km^{2} (43,165 sq mi)

Population (2022)
  - Total: 373,577
  - Density: 3.34157/km^{2} (8.65461/sq mi)
- Time zone: UTC+03:00 (SAST)
- ISO 3166-2: SA–08
- Area code: 014
- Website: arar-mu.momah.gov.sa/ar

The Northern Borders Province (Note: also known as the Northern Borders Region (Arabic: منطقة الحدود الشمالية, romanized: Minṭaqat al-Ḥudūd ash-Shamāliyya)) is a province in Saudi Arabia, situated in the northern region, bordering Iraq to the north and northwest, and Jordan to the west.

== History ==
Historically, the location of the modern-day province served as a key passage for caravans and trade between the Arabian Peninsula, the Levant, and Mesopotamia. It was established as an official administrative province in 1970, and its proximity to international borders has given it strategic importance since the formation of the Third Saudi State in the early 20th century. In recent decades, the province has witnessed growing development in infrastructure and industry, particularly in mining, as part of national efforts to stimulate growth in northern Saudi Arabia.

== Geography ==
The Northern Borders Province is located in the far north of Saudi Arabia. It shares international borders with Jordan to the northwest and Iraq to the north. Domestically, it borders the Eastern Province to the south, Al-Jouf Province to the west, Hail Province and Al-Qassim Province to the southwest. The province covers an area of approximately 104,000 square kilometers, making up about 5.3% of the total area of Saudi Arabia.

The province experiences a continental desert climate, with hot summers and cold winters—temperatures can drop below freezing in winter, and occasional snowfall is observed on elevated terrain. Rainfall is sparse and mainly occurs during the winter and spring seasons.

Geologically, the province lies on the Arabian Shelf, and is known for its rich mineral deposits, particularly phosphate. It hosts the Waad Al-Shamal Industrial City, a major mining and industrial hub established to support Saudi Arabia’s economic diversification, with investments exceeding SAR 85 billion.

The Northern Borders Province also includes several protected natural reserves, such as Mu'ayla, Al-Owaisi, Al-Ghurabah, and a portion of the Harrat Al-Harrah reserve. These areas are home to desert wildlife and are associated with traditional hunting practices like falconry.

== Etymology ==
The name Al-Ḥudūd Aš-Šamāliyya (Arabic: الحدود الشمالية) translates literally to "the Northern Borders" in English. It is derived from two Arabic words: al-ḥudūd (الحدود), meaning "the borders" or "boundaries," and aš-šamāliyya (الشمالية), meaning "northern." The name reflects the province's geographical position in the far north of Saudi Arabia, where it borders Iraq and Jordan. The term emphasizes the region's role as a frontier zone and its historical significance as a point of connection and transition between the Arabian Peninsula and the Levant.

== Transportation ==
=== Air ===
The Northern Borders Province has three domestic airports:

- Arar Domestic Airport – serves the provincial seat, Arar.
- Rafha Domestic Airport – serves Rafha.
- Turaif Domestic Airport – serves Turaif.

=== Border crossing ===
The province is connected to Iraq via the Jadidat Arar border crossing. The crossing was closed in 1990 following the Gulf War, except during the Hajj season. In 2017, it was partially reopened for limited travel, and it was fully reopened on 18 November 2020, allowing travelers, visitors, and commercial transport between Saudi Arabia and Iraq.

== Education ==
The Northern Borders Province is served by Northern Borders University (NBU), the only university in the province. It was established in 2007 by royal decree following a visit by the late King Abdullah. The university's main campus is located in Arar, with additional branches in Rafha, Turaif, and Al-Uwayqilah. It offers a variety of academic programs across disciplines such as medicine, engineering, computer science, business, and education. The university serves both men and women.

The province also has a network of public schools administered by the Ministry of Education, serving students at the elementary, intermediate, and secondary levels. Schools are distributed across urban centers and smaller towns to ensure access to education for all residents.

In addition to the university, the province hosts several institutions for technical and vocational education and training. These institutions are managed by the Technical and Vocational Training Corporation (TVTC),

== Population ==
Historical population
Year	Pop.	±% p.a.
1992	229,060	—
2004	279,971	+1.69%
2010	321,880	+2.35%
2022	373,577	+1.25%

== Governorates ==
Map of The Northern Borders Province

The province consists of three governorates, with Arar City serving as the seat of the province. The governorates can be categorized into Category A and Category B based on the availability of services.

Seat
Governorate (A)
Governorate (B)

#	Governorate	2010 Census	2022 Census
–	Arar	191,402	202,719
1	Rafha	81,201	84,536
2	Turaif	49,277	66,004
3	Al-Uwayqilah	16,696	20,318

== Provincial government ==
The province is governed by a governor (Emir) appointed by the King of Saudi Arabia, assisted by a deputy governor.

Governor	Term of Office	Monarch(s)
Office established
Mohammed bin Ahmed	1948 – 1957	Abdulaziz, Saud
Abdullah bin Abdulaziz	1957 – 4 July 2015	Saud, Faisal, Khalid, Fahd, Abdullah, Salman
Mishal bin Abdullah	13 July 2015 – 22 April 2017	Salman
Faisal bin Khalid	22 April 2017 – present	Salman

== See also ==
- Provinces of Saudi Arabia
- List of governorates of Saudi Arabia
- List of cities and towns in Saudi Arabia
