= Arar border crossing =

International border crossing between Saudi Arabia and Iraq

Coordinates: 31°21′30″N 41°26′35″E

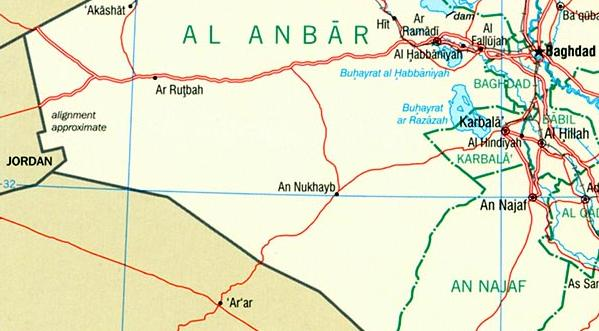
Arar border crossing

Arar (Arabic: عرعر ʿArʿar [ˈʕarʕar]) is a border crossing between Saudi Arabia and Iraq. The nearest town in Saudi Arabia is Arar (ʿArʿar) and the nearest in Iraq is An Nukhayb. The crossing has barracks for Iraqi border guards, a mosque, and offices for processing people crossing the border. The crossing sees a huge spike in traffic during the Hajj as Iraqis cross into Saudi Arabia to visit Mecca.

== Background ==
On 5 January 2015, the Saudi forces at the crossing were subject to a suicide attack by ISIL. Two guards were killed in the attack.

On 18 November 2020, Arar crossing was reopened after 30 years of closure following the Gulf War.
