= Arar City =

Capital of Northern Borders Province, Saudi Arabia

Arar عرعر
- City
- Location of Arar within the Northern Borders Province

- Location within Saudi Arabia
- Coordinates: 30°58′31″N 41°01′23″E
- Country: Saudi Arabia
- Province: Northern Borders
- Region: Badiyat al-Sham

Government
  - Type: Municipality
  - Body: Arar Municipality

Area
  - Total: 21,360 km^{2} (8,250 sq mi)
- Elevation: 536 m (1,759 ft)

Population (2022)
  - Total: 202,719
  - Density: 9.491/km^{2} (24.58/sq mi)
- Time zone: UTC+03:00 (SAST)
- Area code: 014
- Website: www.arar-mu.gov.sa

Arar (Arabic: عرعر) is a city in northern Saudi Arabia. It is the seat of the Northern Borders Province. The city is located near the border with Iraq. As of the 2022 census, it had a population of 202,719.

== History ==
The city of Arar was founded in 1951 following the construction of the Trans-Arabian Pipeline by Saudi Aramco. Initially, Arar served as an oil pumping station, equipped with a health center and worker housing. The early workforce primarily consisted of individuals from Al-Ahsa, Hail, Yanbu, and Al-Wajh. In 1954, a summit was held in Arar between King Saud of Saudi Arabia and King Hussein of Jordan during their respective reigns. In 1968, the remains of an ancient city were discovered approximately 30 km from Arar. The site yielded numerous finely crafted sculptures and statues of aquatic creatures such as turtles and fish. Additionally, around 200 inscriptions in the Safaitic and Thamudic scripts were found. Iraqi Airways Flight 163 crashed near the Arar Domestic Airport on 25 December 1986. The plane was flying from Baghdad, Iraq, to Amman, Jordan. In 1990, the Arar border crossing with Iraq was officially closed following the Gulf War, except during the Hajj season. It was partially reopened in 2017 for limited travel and religious purposes, and later fully reopened on November 18, 2020. The Islamic State had planned to attack the city as part of their invasion of Iraq. On 5 January 2015, two Saudi border guards were killed in a suicide attack by the Islamic State at the Arar Border Crossing. However, thereafter ISIS was diminished militarily by other events elsewhere and could not pursue further attacks in the city. In 2019, King Salman and Crown Prince Mohammed bin Salman visited the city.

== Geography ==
Arar is located in the northernmost part of Saudi Arabia, approximately 1,100 kilometers northwest of Riyadh and about 60 kilometers from the Iraqi border. It serves as the capital of the Northern Borders Province (Al-Ḥudūd Aš-Šamāliyya).

Arar lies within a vast rocky limestone plain characterized by arid desert landscapes. The city's elevation is approximately 536 meters (1,759 feet) above sea level.

The city is situated along Wadi Arar, a major valley in the central part of the Northern Borders Province of Saudi Arabia. The wadi originates about 125 kilometers southwest of Arar, flowing in a southwest-to-northeast direction. It passes through Arar and merges with several other wadis and shaʻibs (dry tributaries) before crossing the border into Iraq. Historically, Wadi Arar supported rich vegetation and native wildlife, and in recent years, environmental restoration projects have been initiated to combat desertification and restore biodiversity.

=== Climate ===
According to the Köppen–Geiger climate classification system, Arar has a hot desert climate (BWh). Winds in the region generally blow from the east or west, and rarely from the south. Over recent decades, rainfall levels have gradually declined. Although the city is located in a desert region, snowfall is not uncommon and typically occurs every two to three years.

Climate data for Arar (1991–2020)
Month	Jan	Feb	Mar	Apr	May	Jun	Jul	Aug	Sep	Oct	Nov	Dec	Year
Record high °C (°F)	27.0 (80.6)	33.2 (91.8)	38.1 (100.6)	41.2 (106.2)	45.1 (113.2)	48.0 (118.4)	49.0 (120.2)	48.8 (119.8)	47.2 (117.0)	42.7 (108.9)	40.0 (104.0)	30.3 (86.5)	49.0 (120.2)
Mean daily maximum °C (°F)	16.0 (60.8)	18.7 (65.7)	23.9 (75.0)	29.8 (85.6)	35.6 (96.1)	40.2 (104.4)	42.4 (108.3)	42.6 (108.7)	39.2 (102.6)	32.8 (91.0)	23.1 (73.6)	17.5 (63.5)	30.1 (86.2)
Daily mean °C (°F)	9.3 (48.7)	11.8 (53.2)	16.8 (62.2)	22.4 (72.3)	28.1 (82.6)	32.4 (90.3)	34.6 (94.3)	34.7 (94.5)	31.1 (88.0)	24.8 (76.6)	16.1 (61.0)	10.8 (51.4)	22.7 (72.9)
Mean daily minimum °C (°F)	3.7 (38.7)	5.5 (41.9)	9.6 (49.3)	15.0 (59.0)	20.3 (68.5)	24.1 (75.4)	26.3 (79.3)	26.3 (79.3)	22.9 (73.2)	17.6 (63.7)	10.1 (50.2)	5.2 (41.4)	15.5 (59.9)
Record low °C (°F)	−6.3 (20.7)	−5.0 (23.0)	0.0 (32.0)	1.0 (33.8)	12.0 (53.6)	17.0 (62.6)	21.1 (70.0)	20.1 (68.2)	14.8 (58.6)	7.5 (45.5)	−2.9 (26.8)	−5.0 (23.0)	−6.3 (20.7)
Average precipitation mm (inches)	10.1 (0.40)	6.2 (0.24)	5.7 (0.22)	6.4 (0.25)	1.7 (0.07)	0.0 (0.0)	0.0 (0.0)	0.0 (0.0)	0.0 (0.0)	4.2 (0.17)	11.6 (0.46)	8.0 (0.31)	54.0 (2.13)
Average precipitation days (≥ 1.0 mm)	2.0	1.3	1.2	1.3	0.5	0.0	0.0	0.0	0.0	1.0	1.8	1.3	10.5
Source: NOAA

== Etymology ==
The name Arar (Arabic: عرعر) is derived from the name of a nearby valley called Wadi Arar. The term "Arar" is linked to the Arabic verb ʿarara, which means "to cut" or "to tear the earth," reflecting the valley’s distinctive erosive landscape.

While the word "Arar" is also the Arabic name for the Juniperus procera tree (ʿarʿar), which is native to the southwestern highlands of Saudi Arabia, the juniper tree itself does not naturally grow in the northern region where the city is located. The association with the juniper tree is primarily linguistic and historical rather than botanical.

Historical Arabic literature, including poetry by Imru' al-Qais and writings by geographers such as Yaqut al-Hamawi and Al-Hijri, mention Wadi Arar, indicating that the name has long been linked to the region well before the establishment of the modern city.

== Sports ==
Arar is home to Prince Abdullah bin Musaad Sports City Stadium, a multi-purpose stadium that opened in 1981. The stadium is primarily used for football matches and serves as the home ground of Arar FC, the city's main football club. It has a seating capacity of 6,000 spectators.

== Transportation ==
=== Air ===
Arar Domestic Airport serves as the primary airport for the city, providing domestic flights that connect Arar to other major cities in Saudi Arabia.

== Notable people ==
- Bander Faleh – professional football player.
- Ibn al-Khattab – Islamic rebel separatist and former commander of the Chechen Mujahideen during the Second Chechen War.

== See also ==
- Arar
- Arar border crossing
- List of wadis of Saudi Arabia
- List of cities and towns in Saudi Arabia
