= Talab Abu Arar =

Bedouin Israeli-Arab politician

- طلب أبو عرار
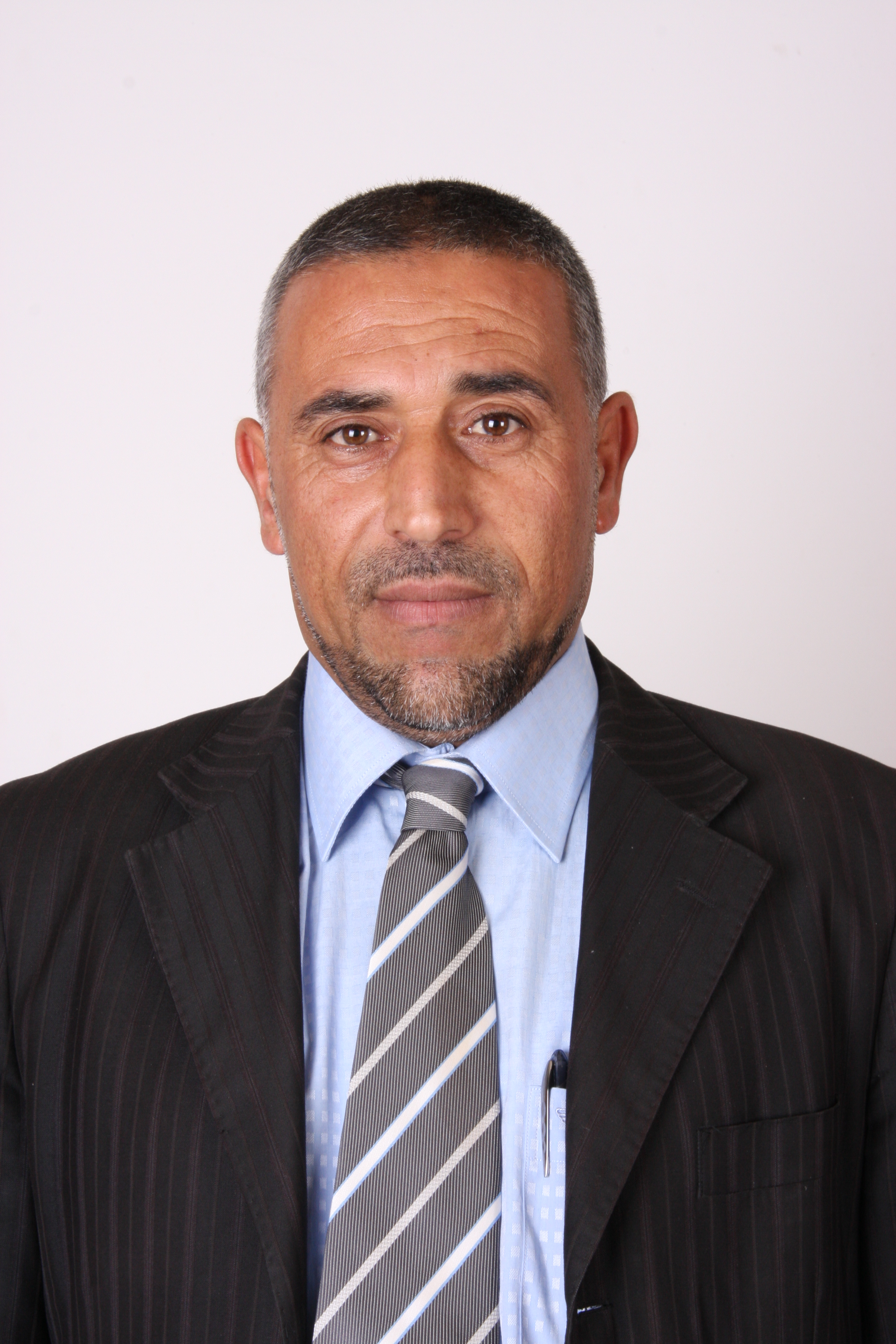

Faction represented in the Knesset
- 2013–2015: United Arab List
- 2015–2019: Joint List

Personal details
- Born: 4 May 1967 (age 59) Israel
- Education: Ono Academic College

Taleb Abu Arar (Arabic: طلب أبو عرار, Hebrew: טלב אבו עראר; born 4 May 1967) is a Bedouin Israeli-Arab politician who previously served as a member of the Knesset for the United Arab List.

== Biography ==
Abu Arar began his career as a teacher, working at the Abu-Arar school from 1989 until 2000. Between 2000 and 2004 he served as Head of the Ar'arat an-Naqab local council.

In 2009 he was appointed manager of the United Arab List faction in the Knesset. In 2012 he was placed fourth on the United Arab List's list for the 2013 Knesset elections, and entered the Knesset as the party won four seats. Abu Arar was placed Ninth on the Joint List's electoral list for the 2015 election and was re-elected as the list won 13 seats. ahead of the April 2019 election, he was placed fifth on the joint Ra'am-Balad list, and was not re-elected as the alliance won four seats.

Abu Arar is married to two women and between them, has 10 children. He earned a Bachelor's Degree in law, at Ono Academic College.
