= Battle of Al-Bukiryah =

1904 battle of the Saudi–Rashidi War

Coordinates: 26.25°N 43.76667°E

Battle of Bekeriyah
- Part of Saudi–Rashidi War
- Location of Bekeriyah, Saudi Arabia.
Date	June 15, 1904
Location	Bekeriyah, Qassim region, Arabia
Result	Saudi victory

Belligerents
Emirate of Ha'il; Ottoman Empire	Emirate of Riyadh

Commanders and leaders
Abdul-Aziz bin Mitab	Abdulaziz Ibn Saud

Strength
20,000	12,000

Casualties and losses
300–500; 1,900–2,000 Ottoman killed or wounded	1,000

Battle of al-Bukayriyya was a major battle of the 1903–1907 Saudi–Rashidi War, during the Unification of Saudi Arabia campaign, fought between the ruling Rashidi dynasty and the Saudi rebels. It occurred in July 1904 at the town of Bekeriyah in the Qassim region. After Ibn Saud's victory in the Battle of Dilam, he tried to expand his power by capturing Qassim, weakening his Rashidi enemies and their Ottoman allies. The battle ended in a Saudi victory with heavy casualties on both sides.
