= Turki bin Abdullah Al Saud (1755–1834) =

Ruler of the Emirate of Nejd (1755–1834)

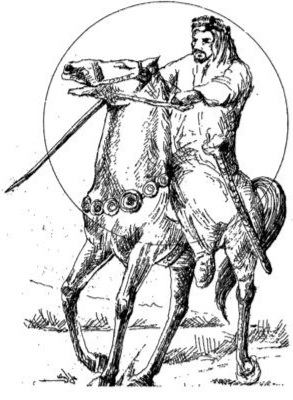
- A drawing of Turki bin Abdullah by Munir al-Ajlani

Emir of Najd
- Reign: 1823–9 May 1834
- Predecessor: Abdullah bin Saud Al Saud; Muhammad Ali of Egypt
- Successor: Mishari bin Abdul Rahman Al Saud
- Born: 1755; Ottoman Empire
- Died: 9 May 1834 (aged 78–79); Riyadh, Emirate of Nejd
- Issue: List: Faisal bin Turki; Fahd bin Turki; Jiluwi bin Turki; Abdullah bin Turki
Names
- Turki bin Abdullah bin Muhammad bin Saud bin Muhammad bin Muqrin Al Maridi Al Adui
- Dynasty: Saud
- Father: Abdullah bin Muhammad

Turki bin Abdullah Al Saud (Arabic: ترکي بن عبدالله بن محمد; 1755 – 9 May 1834) was the founder of the Emirate of Najd, also known as Second Saudi State and ruled Najd from 1823–1834 following administration by the Ottoman Empire.

== Family background and early life ==
Turki was born in 1755. He was the son of Abdullah bin Muhammad who was the youngest son of Muhammad bin Saud, founder of the First Saudi State, and the brother of Abdulaziz bin Muhammad, the second ruler and first Imam of the State. Imam Abdulaziz's grandson, Abdullah bin Saud, was the last Imam of the First Saudi State. This made Turki the first cousin once removed of Imam Abdullah bin Saud.

== Ascent ==
Turki fought in defense of Diriyah against the Egyptians and hostile tribes, including Banu Khalid. He escaped when the city was seized by Ibrahim Pasha in 1818, marking the end of the First Saudi State. He spent the next two years in hiding due to the ensuing persecution of the Al Saud with Abdullah bin Saud being sent to Cairo and then, to İstanbul to be executed by the Ottomans. Turki briefly collaborated with Mohammad bin Mishari bin Muammar, an Arab client of Muhammad Ali, who aspired to rule Najd himself. However, when Mishari bin Saud, the last Imam’s brother, escaped from Egyptian captivity to reassert Saudi rule, Turki joined him and was appointed governor of Riyadh. Ibn Muammar quickly crushed the revolt, however, and imprisoned Mishari. Turki retaliated by capturing Ibn Muammar and his son (also named Mishari). An attempt to exchange both men for Mishari bin Saud before the latter was returned to Egyptian custody failed, resulting in the execution of Ibn Muammar and his son. Turki was then forced back into hiding. By this time, many senior members of the House of Saud had been killed, exiled, or imprisoned, leaving Turki as one of the few within the family willing and able to assume leadership.

== Reign ==
In 1823, Turki re-emerged to form an alliance with Sawaid, the ruler of Jalajil in Sudair, and had soon established himself in Irqah. He made further incursions into Najd, in which he seized major settlements such as Durma and Manfuhah in order to isolate Riyadh and its Egyptian garrison. By August 1824, Riyadh itself came under siege and fell a few months later; Turki designated Riyadh as the new Saudi capital the same year as Diriyah had been devastated and largely depopulated by the Egyptians during their occupation. In Riyadh he constructed Qasr Al Hukm in 1824 to be used as the headquarters of the Amir.

Though he had succeeded in re-establishing a viable Saudi polity, Turki chose to remain a nominal vassal of the Ottomans due to what had happened to Abdullah bin Saud. This in no way inhibited his attempts over the next several years to consolidate his hold in Najd, with Kharj, Qasim, and Jabal Shammar all having submitted to Saudi rule by 1828 despite clashes with the local Bedouin. With Hejaz and the Red Sea remaining in Egyptian hands, further expansion was directed eastwards. The conquest of the Eastern Province was achieved in 1830, in response to a Bedouin invasion from this region led by the Banu Khalid. Efforts to extend Saudi influence along the Persian Gulf littoral, however, met with mixed success. The mere threat of invasion was enough to subdue Oman in 1833 yet Bahrain revolted in the same year (having agreed to pay tribute three years prior), a situation that remained unresolved at the time of Turki’s death.

In addition to his religious personality and extensive involvement in war Turki was also a patron of poets, namely Rahman bin Jabir and Abdulaziz bin Hamad bin Nasir bin Muammar, during his reign.

== Assassination ==
In spite of his success in returning the House of Saud to power, Turki could not avoid falling victim to familial intrigue. On 9 May 1834, as the imam was leaving the mosque, he was ambushed and slain by three assassins working for his second-cousin (and fellow member of the House of Saud) Mishari bin Abdul Rahman. It was Mishari who then emerged “with an unsheathed sword”, insisting that he, and not Faisal (who was away on campaign against Bahrain), was the new imam. Faisal, however, quickly learned of his father's assassination and hurried back to Riyadh. He reached this city by the end of May, defeating and executing Mishari within a matter of weeks. Yet this was only a partial victory as it would take almost a decade of fighting against other would-be usurpers before Faisal succeeded in establishing his authority as Turki’s successor.

== Personal life ==
The Second Saudi State would endure until 1891. In addition, Turki was the progenitor of four branches of the House of Saud:

- The Al Faisal- through his eldest son and successor Faisal; this is the branch to which the present line of Saudi monarchs belongs. According to the Library of Congress, it contained several thousand male descendants of Turki by the late twentieth century.
- The Al Turki- through his youngest son Abdullah bin Turki.
- The Al Jiluwi- through his son Jiluwi who was born while Turki was in exile. His mother was Huwaydiya bint Ghaydan bin Jazi Al Shamir.
- The Saud Al Kabir- through Faisal's son Saud whose mother was Dashisha bint Rakan bin Mandil.

The Imam Turki bin Abdullah Mosque in Riyadh is named in his honour.

== Bibliography ==
- Joseph A. Kechichian (2001). Succession in Saudi Arabia. Palgrave Macmillan. ISBN 978-0312299620.
- Alexei Vassiliev (2013). The History of Saudi Arabia. London: Saqi. ISBN 978-0863567797.
- R. Bayly Winder (1965). Saudi Arabia in the Nineteenth Century. London: Palgrave Macmillan. ISBN 978-1349817238.

Preceded by Office established	Imam of the Second Saudi State; 1819–1820	Succeeded by Muhammad Ali of Egypt
Preceded by Muhammad Ali of Egypt	Imam of the Second Saudi State; 1824–1834	Succeeded by Mishari bin Abdul Rahman bin Mishari
