= Jiluwi bin Turki Al Saud =

Saudi royal (1819–1875)

- Born: 1819
- Died: 1875 (aged 55–56)
- Spouse: Noura bint Ahmed Al Sudairi
- Issue: List: Princess Sara; Prince Musaed; Prince Abdullah; Prince Abdulaziz; Prince Fahd
Names
- Jiluwi bin Turki bin Abdullah bin Muhammad bin Saud
- House: Al Saud
- Father: Turki bin Abdullah bin Muhammad bin Saud
- Mother: Huwaydiya bint Ghaidan bin Jazi bin Ali Al Shamir

Jiluwi bin Turki Al Saud (1819–1875) was one of the children of Turki bin Abdullah who ruled the Emirate of Najd between 1819 and 1834 with an interruption from 1820 to 1824.

== Biography ==
Jiluwi was born in about 1819. He was the younger brother of King Abdulaziz's grandfather and the second ruler of the emirate, Faisal bin Turki.

Jiluwi's mother was Huwaydiya bint Ghaidan bin Jazi bin Ali Al Shamir. His parents married when Turki bin Abdullah took refuge with the Al Shamir branch of the Ajman tribe. In fact, his name, Jiluwi (dialectically, Jlūwi), was originated from the Arabic phrase fi jalwatihi referring to a person in exile like Turki bin Abdullah.

Jiluwi bin Turki accompanied his brother Faisal, ruler of the Emirate of Najd, when he was sent to exile in Egypt in the December 1838. When they returned to Arabia and Faisal reestablished his rule Jiluwi was appointed governor of Qassim based in Unaizah in 1849. Jiluwi served in the post until 1854. Due to the tensions between local people and Faisal as well as due to the poor administration of Jiluwi a rebellion against the Emirate emerged in 1854.

Jiluwi's spouse was Noura bint Ahmed Al Sudairi, sister of Sara bint Ahmed who was the mother of King Abdulaziz. Jiluwi's two sons, Abdulaziz and Fahd, accompanied their cousin, Abdul Rahman bin Faisal, during the exile of the Al Saud family. Another son, Abdullah, joined to them later who would become the first and long-term governor of the Eastern Province following the capture of the region by Abdulaziz.

Jiluwi's daughter, Sara, married Abdul Rahman bin Faisal, and one of their children was Muhammad. The granddaughter of Jiluwi and Noura, Al Jawhara bint Musaed, married King Abdulaziz with whom she had three children, Prince Muhammad, King Khalid and Princess Al Anoud.

Jiluwi bin Turki died in 1875. His descendants are known as the Al Jiluwi branch of the Saudi royal family, House of Saud.
