= Asi bin Shuraim Al Shammari =

Arabian Shammar tribe chief (1854–1937)

- Born: c. 1854
- Died: 1937 (aged 82–83)
- Issue: Fahda bint Asi Al Shuraim Al Shammari
- House: Al Rashid
- Father: Kulayb bin Hamdan bin Shuraim Al Shammari

Asi bin Shuraim Al Shammari (Arabic: عاصي بن الشريم الشمري) (c. 1854–1937) was an Arab leader of the powerful Shammar tribe and the grandfather of King Abdullah of Saudi Arabia. He was a member of the Abde section of the Shammar tribe. He was a former tribal chief and the sheikh of the southern part of the tribe.

Asi's daughter Fahda married the tenth Al Rashid emir, Saud bin Abdulaziz Al Rashid. After Emir Saud was assassinated, she was married to Abdulaziz, who later became king of Saudi Arabia. She was the eighth spouse of Abdulaziz. She was one of the two Al Rashid women married to him. She was the mother of Abdulaziz and Mishaal by her first marriage as well as King Abdullah, Princess Nouf and Princess Seeta by her second marriage.

Asi became one of the most prominent supporters of King Abdulaziz. He joined his forces in several battles during the formation of Saudi Arabia, including the Battle of Sabilla in 1929. He died in 1937.
