= Abdullah of Saudi Arabia =

King of Saudi Arabia from 2005 to 2015

Abdullah
- Custodian of the Two Holy Mosques
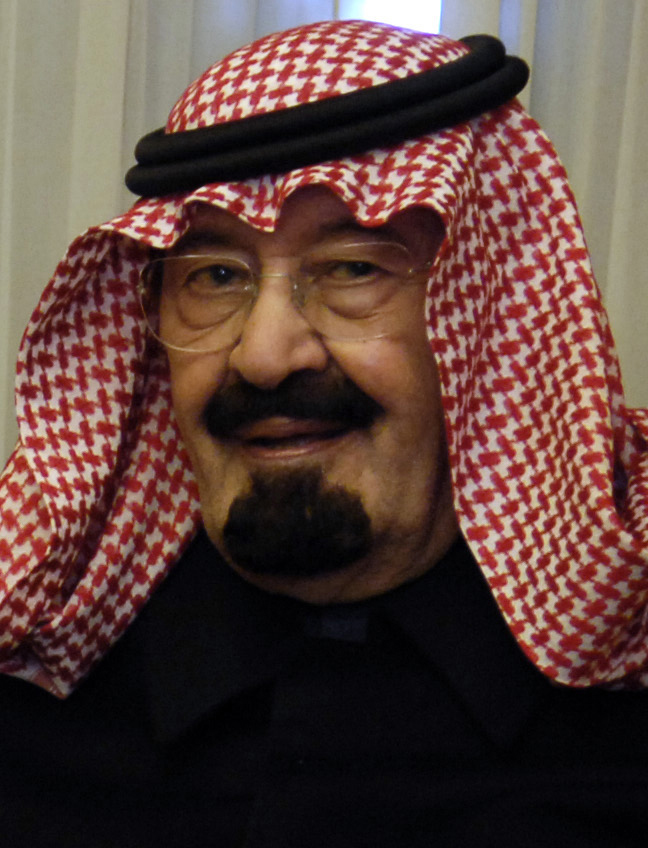
- Abdullah in 2007

King and Prime Minister of Saudi Arabia
- Reign: 1 August 2005 – 23 January 2015
- Bay'ah: 2 August 2005
- Predecessor: Fahd
- Successor: Salman

Regent of Saudi Arabia
- Tenure: 1 January 1996 – 1 August 2005
- Monarch: Fahd

Crown Prince of Saudi Arabia First Deputy Prime Minister
- Tenure: 13 June 1982 – 1 August 2005
- Monarch: Fahd
- Prime Minister: King Fahd
- Predecessor: Fahd bin Abdulaziz
- Successor: Sultan bin Abdulaziz

Second Deputy Prime Minister of Saudi Arabia
- Tenure: 25 April 1975 – 13 June 1982
- Monarch: Khalid
- Prime Minister: King Khalid
- Predecessor: Fahd bin Abdulaziz
- Successor: Sultan bin Abdulaziz

Commander of the National Guard
- Tenure: 1963–2010
- Monarch: List: Saud; Faisal; Khalid; Fahd; Himself
- Predecessor: Saad bin Saud
- Successor: Mutaib bin Abdullah
- Born: 1 August 1924; Riyadh, Sultanate of Nejd
- Died: 23 January 2015 (aged 90); Riyadh, Saudi Arabia
- Burial: 23 January 2015; Al Oud cemetery, Riyadh
- Spouses: List: Al Anoud Al Fayez (1972–2003; divorced); Jawahir bint Ali Hussein; Aida Fustuq (divorced); Munira Al Otaishan; Munira bint Abdullah Al Al Shaykh; Tathi bint Mishan al Faisal al Jarba; Hessa bint Trad Al Shaalan; (23 or more other wives)
- Issue Detail: 36, including: Prince Khalid; Prince Faisal; Prince Abdulaziz; Prince Mishaal; Prince Turki; Princess Adila; Princess Abeer
Names
- Abdullah bin Abdulaziz bin Abdul Rahman
- House: Al Saud
- Father: Abdulaziz of Saudi Arabia
- Mother: Fahda bint Asi Al Shuraim

Abdullah bin Abdulaziz Al Saud (Note: Arabic: عبد الله بن عبدالعزيز آل سعود, romanized: ʿAbd Allāh ibn ʿAbd al ʿAzīz Āl Suʿūd, Najdi Arabic pronunciation: [ʢæbˈdɑɫ.ɫɐ ben ˈʢæbdæl ʢæˈziːz ʔæːl sæˈʢuːd]) (1 August 1924 – 23 January 2015) was King and Prime Minister of Saudi Arabia from 1 August 2005 until his death in 2015. Prior to his accession, he was Crown Prince of Saudi Arabia from 13 June 1982. He was the tenth son of King Abdulaziz, the founder of Saudi Arabia.

Abdullah was the son of King Abdulaziz and Fahda bint Asi Al Shuraim. His mother was a member of the Al Rashid dynasty, historical rivals of the Al Saud dynasty. Abdullah held important political posts throughout most of his adult life. In 1961 he became mayor of Mecca, his first public office. The following year, he was appointed commander of the Saudi Arabian National Guard, a post he was still holding when he became king. He also served as deputy defense minister and was named crown prince when his half-brother Fahd took the throne in 1982. After King Fahd suffered a serious stroke in 1995, Abdullah became the de facto ruler of Saudi Arabia until ascending the throne a decade later.

During his reign, Abdullah maintained close relations with the United States and the United Kingdom and bought billions of dollars' worth of defense equipment from both states. Abdullah maintained the status quo when there were waves of protest in the kingdom during the Arab Spring. He held four of his daughters, which he fathered with Al Anoud Al Fayez whom he married when she was age 15, captive against their will.

The three crown princes during Abdullah's reign were among the full brothers of King Fahd. Upon becoming king in 2005, Abdullah appointed his half-brother Sultan bin Abdulaziz as crown prince. When Sultan died in 2011, Sultan's full brother Nayef was named heir to the throne, but Nayef himself died the next year. Abdullah then named Salman bin Abdulaziz as crown prince. According to various reports, Abdullah married up to 30 times and had more than 35 children. He was among the wealthiest royals in the world. Upon his death in 2015 at age 90, he was succeeded by his half-brother Salman.

== Early life ==
Abdullah is said to have been born on 1 August 1924 in Riyadh. However, some sources state that this date is incorrect, and that he was approximately eight years older. He was the tenth son of King Abdulaziz. His mother, Fahda bint Asi Al Shuraim, was a member of the Al Rashid dynasty, longtime rivals of the Al Saud dynasty. She was descended from the powerful Shammar tribe and was the daughter of former tribe chief Asi bin Shuraim. She died when Abdullah was six years old. Abdullah had two younger full-sisters, Nouf and Seeta, and two maternal half-brothers, Abdulaziz and Mishaal, who were the children of his mother's first marriage to Saud bin Abdulaziz Al Rashid. Madawi Al-Rasheed argues that Abdullah's maternal roots and his earlier experience of a speech impediment led to delay in his rise to higher status among the sons of King Abdulaziz.

== Commander of National Guard ==
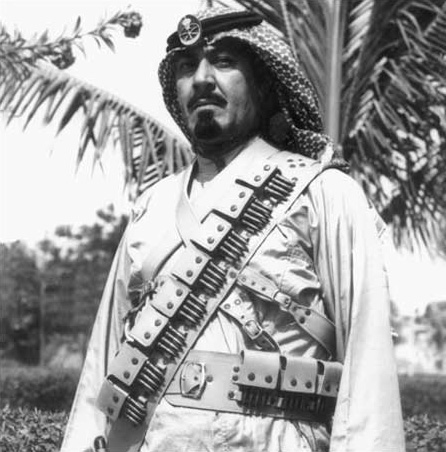
Abdullah as commander of Saudi National Guard

In August 1963, Abdullah was made commander of Saudi National Guard replacing Saad bin Saud, a son of King Saud, in the post. This post allowed him to secure his position in the House of Saud. SANG, which had been based on the Ikhwan, became a modern armed force under his command. Beginning 1985, SANG also sponsored the Janadiriyah festival that institutionalized traditional folk dances, camel races and tribal heritage.

== Second in line ==
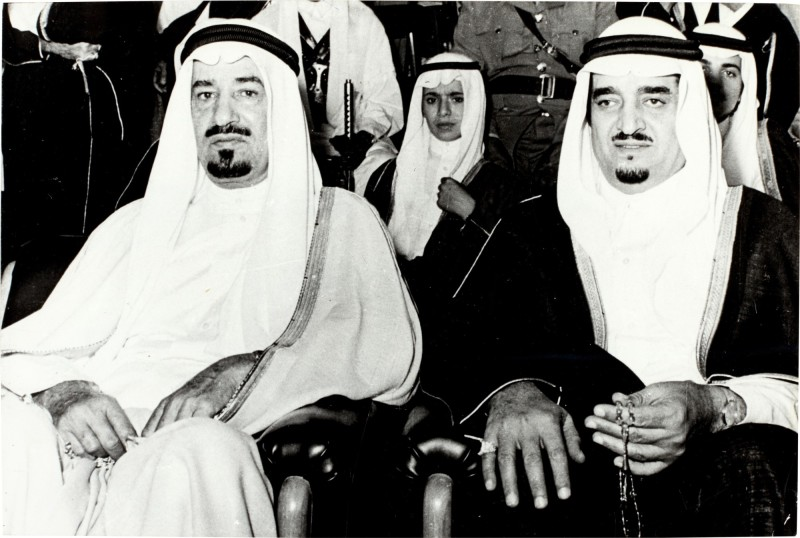
Abdullah's two predecessors on the throne, King Khalid (left) and King Fahd

King Khalid appointed Abdullah as second deputy prime minister on 29 March 1975 just four days after his kingship which was a reflection of his status as second in the line of succession to the Saudi throne. Therefore, he became the number three in the Saudi administration. However, his appointment caused friction in the House of Saud. Then-Crown Prince Fahd, together with his full-brothers, known as the Sudairi Seven, supported the appointment of their own full brother, Sultan. Abdullah was pressured to cede control of SANG in return for his appointment as second deputy prime minister. In August 1977, this generated a debate among hundreds of princes in Riyadh. Abdullah did not relinquish authority of SANG in that he feared that this would weaken his authority.

In March 1979 when Crown Prince Fahd left Saudi Arabia and stayed in Europe for a long time Prince Abdullah presided over the council of ministers and held a much more active role in diplomatic affairs of Saudi Arabia. During the same period he was one of the members of the inner family council which was led by King Khalid and included Abdullah's half-brothers Prince Mohammed, Crown Prince Fahd, Prince Sultan and Prince Abdul Muhsin as well as his uncles Prince Ahmed and Prince Musaid.

== Crown Prince and Regent ==
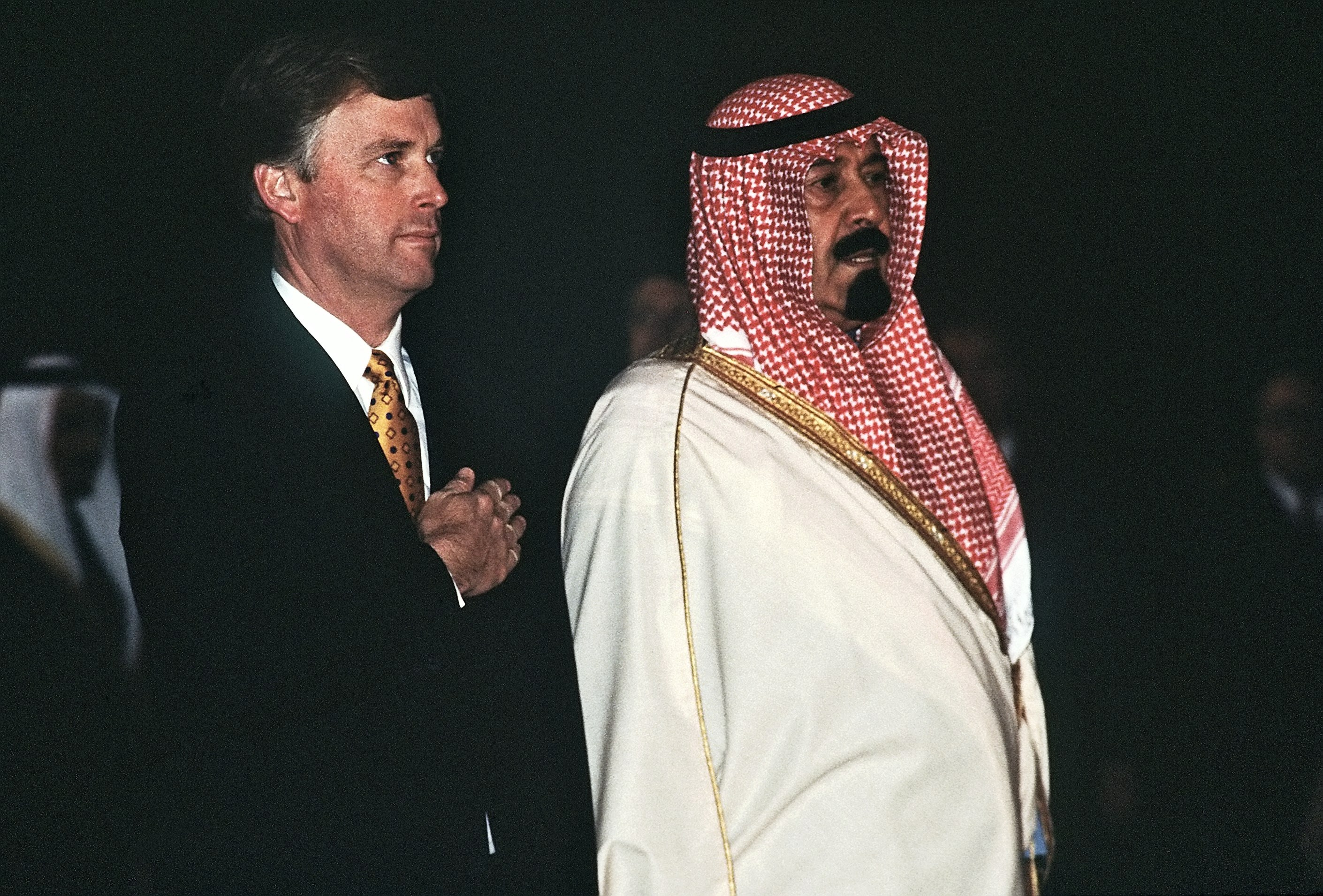
Abdullah with Dan Quayle, 1990

On 13 June 1982 King Khalid died, and Fahd bin Abdulaziz became King. Abdullah became Crown Prince the same day who also maintained his position as head of the National Guard. During his years as crown prince, Abdullah bin Abdulaziz was described as a supporter of accommodation. He managed to group a large number of fringe and marginalized princes discontented with the prospect of the succession being passed among the Sudairi brothers one after the other. His control of the National Guard was also a key factor to his success in becoming crown prince. When King Fahd was incapacitated by a major stroke in 1995, Crown Prince Abdullah acted as de facto regent of Saudi Arabia.

On 4 June 2000, the Al Saud Family Council was established by Crown Prince Abdullah to discuss some private issues, including the business activities of House of Saud members and the marriages of princesses to nonroyals. In May 2001 he did not accept an invitation to visit Washington due to the US support for Israel in the Second Intifada. He also appeared more eager than King Fahd to cut government spending and open Saudi Arabia up economically. He pushed for Saudi membership of the World Trade Organization, surprising some.

In August 2001, he ordered then Saudi Ambassador to the US, Bandar bin Sultan, to return to Washington from Aspen to deliver a message. This reportedly occurred after Crown Prince Abdullah witnessed brutality inflicted by an Israeli soldier upon a Palestinian woman. "This is it. Those bastards!" Abdullah yelled over the phone, according to an account that Bandar has given associates. "Even women they're stepping all over them." Later, he also condemned Israel for attacking families of suspects.

In 2002, he developed the Arab Peace Initiative, commonly referred to as the "Abdullah plan", to achieve a mutually agreed-on resolution of the Arab–Israeli conflict. The initiative was adopted at the Arab League's Beirut summit in March 2002.

On the second anniversary of the September 11 attacks, Crown Prince Abdullah wrote a letter to US President George W. Bush, which ended with the following words:

"God Almighty, in His wisdom, tests the faithful by allowing such calamities to happen. But He, in His mercy, also provides us with the will and determination, generated by faith, to enable us to transform such tragedies into great achievements, and crises that seem debilitating are transformed into opportunities for the advancement of humanity. I only hope that, with your cooperation and leadership, a new world will emerge out of the rubble of the World Trade Center: a world that is blessed by the virtues of freedom, peace, prosperity and harmony."

By late 2003, after the Saudi Arabian branch of al-Qaeda carried out a series of bombings that threatened to destabilize the country, Crown Prince Abdullah, together with other decision-making elites began to deal with political concerns. As Toby Jones wrote in Middle East Report:

One of such moves was his project to promote more tolerance for religious diversity and rein in the forces of politico-religious extremism in the kingdom, leading to the establishment of National Dialogue. In the summer of 2003, Abdullah threw his considerable weight behind the creation of a national dialogue that brought leading religious figures together, including a highly publicized meeting attended by the kingdom's preeminent Shi'i scholar Hasan al-Saffar, as well as a group of Sunni clerics that had previously expressed their loathing for the Shi'i minority.

== King of Saudi Arabia ==
Royal Standard of the King

Abdullah succeeded to the throne upon the death of his half-brother King Fahd. He was formally enthroned on 2 August 2005.

=== Domestic affairs ===
In 2005, Abdullah declared that the national day of the country, 23 September, would be a public holiday in an attempt to reduce the influence of religious figures and some social restrictions. It was criticized by the religious figures who argued that such celebration was not part of Islam.

Abdullah implemented many reform measures. He re-shuffled the ministry of education's leadership in February 2009 by bringing in his pro-reform son-in-law, Faisal bin Abdullah, as the new minister. He also appointed Nora Al Fayez, a U.S.-educated former teacher, as deputy education minister in charge of a new department for female students.

He promoted the construction of the King Abdullah University for Science and Technology (the country's new flagship and controversially co-ed institution for advanced scientific research). The Kingdom's 2010 budget reflected these priorities—about 25 percent was devoted to education alone—and amounts to a significant economic stimulus package.

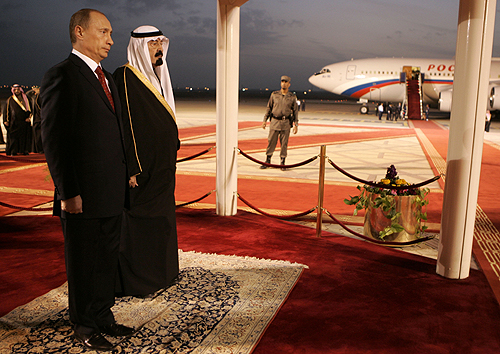
King Abdullah with Vladimir Putin on 11 February 2007

The Saudi government's response to homegrown terrorism was a series of crackdowns including raids by security forces, arrests, torture and public beheadings.

In August 2010, Abdullah decreed that only officially approved religious scholars associated with the Senior Council of Ulema would be allowed to issue fatwas. Similar decrees since 2005 were previously seldom enforced. Individual fatwas relating to personal matters were exempt from the royal decree. The decree also instructed the Grand Mufti to identify eligible scholars.

In light of the Arab Spring, Abdullah laid down a $37 billion (€32.8 billion) programme of new spending including new jobless benefits, education and housing subsidies, debt write-offs, and a new sports channel. There was also a pledge to spend a total of $400 billion by the end of 2014 to improve education, health care and the kingdom's infrastructure. However, Saudi police arrested 100 Shiite protesters who complained of government discrimination. Later during the 2011–2012 Saudi Arabian protests, in September 2011, the King announced women's right to vote in the 2015 municipal council elections, a first significant reform step in the country since the protests. He also stated that women would become eligible to take part in the unelected shura.

In January 2012, Abdullah dismissed the head of Saudi Arabia's powerful religious police, replacing him with a more moderate cleric, state news agency SPA reported, without giving reasons. Abdullatif Abdel Aziz al-Sheikh was named, in place of Sheikh Abdulaziz al Humain, to head the Commission for the Promotion of Virtue and Prevention of Vice. Abdullah had appointed Humain in 2009 to head the "mutaween," which ensures the strict application of the country's ultra-conservative version of Islam, as a step towards reforming it. Humain hired consultants to restructure the organisation, met local human rights groups and consulted professional image-builders in a broad public relations campaign. Under his leadership the commission also investigated and punished some "out-of-control" officers for misbehaviour.

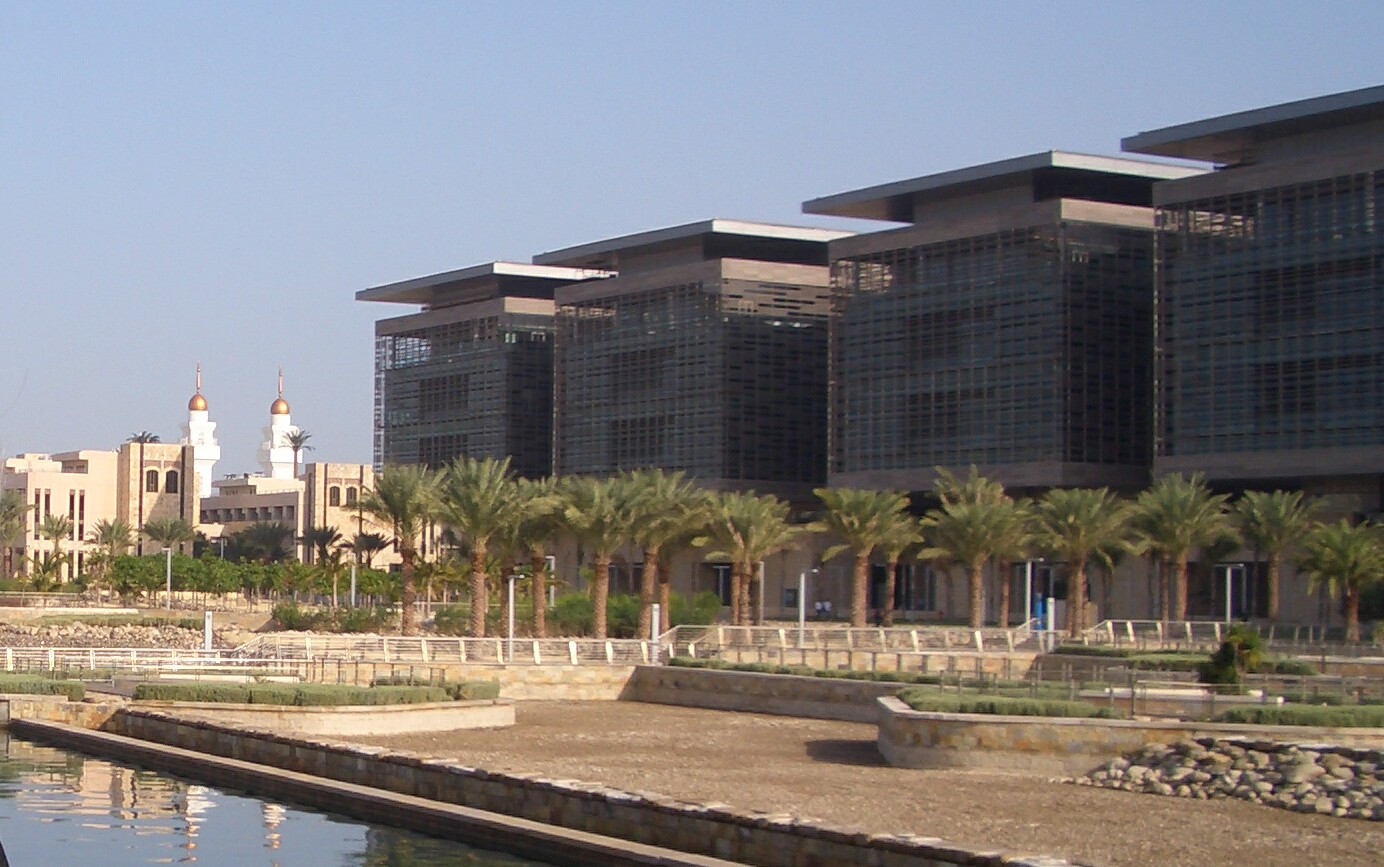
King Abdullah University of Science and Technology

In July 2012, Saudi Arabia announced that it would allow its women athletes to compete in the Olympics for the first time and that the country's Olympic Committee would "oversee participation of women athletes who can qualify". The decision ended speculation that the entire Saudi team might have been disqualified on grounds of gender discrimination. The public participation of women in sport was still fiercely opposed by many Saudi religious conservatives. There had been almost no public tradition of women participating in sport in the country. Saudi officials said that, if successful in qualifying, female competitors would be dressed "to preserve their dignity". On 11 January 2013, Abdullah appointed thirty women to the Consultative Assembly or Shura Council and modified the related law to mandate that no less than 20 percent of 150 members would be women.

In August 2013, the Saudi cabinet, for the first time, approved a law making domestic violence a criminal offence. The law calls for a punishment of up to a year in prison and a fine of up to 50,000 riyals (€11,500/US$13,000). The maximum punishments could be doubled for repeat offenders. The law criminalizes psychological, sexual as well as physical abuse. It also includes a provision obliging employees to report instances of abuse in the workplace to their employer. The move followed a Twitter campaign. The new laws were welcomed by Saudi women's rights activists, although some expressed concerns that the law could not be implemented successfully without new training for the judiciary, and that the tradition of male guardianship would remain an obstacle to prosecutions.

=== Interfaith dialogue ===
In November 2007, Abdullah visited Pope Benedict XVI in the Apostolic Palace, being first Saudi monarch to do so. In March 2008, he called for a "brotherly and sincere dialogue between believers from all religions".

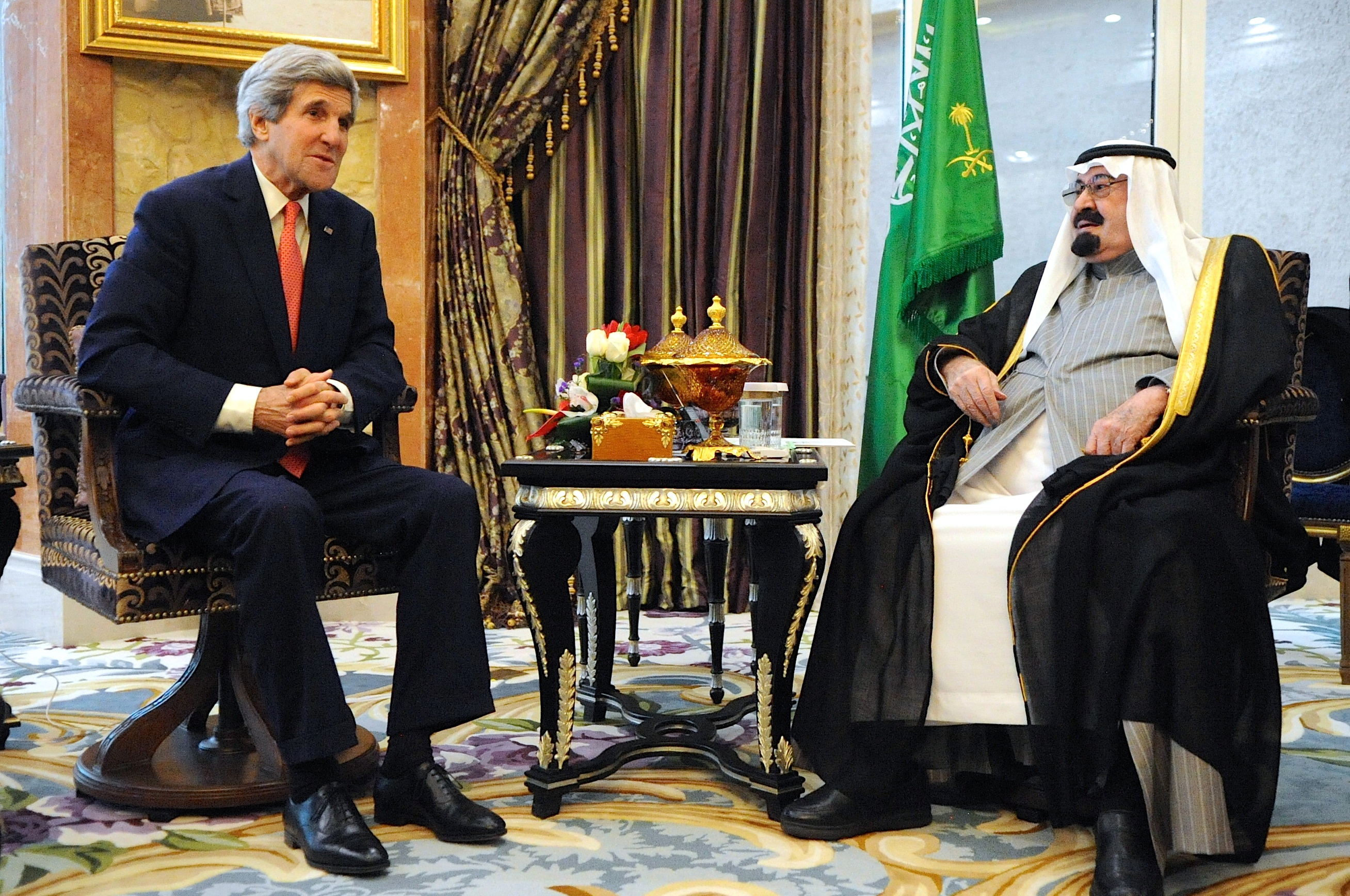
Abdullah in a meeting with US secretary of state John Kerry, 5 January 2014

In June 2008, Abdullah held a conference in Mecca to urge Muslim leaders to speak with one voice with Jewish and Christian leaders. He discussed with, and obtained approval from, Saudi and non-Saudi Islamic scholars to hold the interfaith dialogue. In the same month, Saudi Arabia and Spain agreed to hold the interfaith dialogue in Spain. The historic conference finally took place in Madrid in July 2008, wherein religious leaders of different faiths participated, and which later led to the 2010 proclamation of World Interfaith Harmony Week.

Abdullah had never previously made overtures for dialogue with eastern religious leaders, such as Hindus and Buddhists. The Mecca conference discussed a paper on dialogue with monotheists—highlighting the monotheistic religions of southeast Asia, including Sikhism—in the third axis of the fourth meeting, titled "With Whom We Talk," presented by Sheikh Badrul Hasan Al Qasimi. The session was chaired by Ezz Eddin Ibrahim, cultural adviser to the president of the United Arab Emirates. The session also discussed a paper presented on coordination among Islamic institutions on Dialogue by Abdullah bin Omar Nassif, Secretary General of the World Islamic Council for Preaching and Relief and a paper on dialogue with divine messages, presented by Professor Mohammed Sammak—Secretary General of the Islamic Spiritual Summit in Lebanon.

In November 2008, Abdullah and his government arranged discussion at the United Nations General Assembly to "promote dialogue among civilizations, cultures and peoples, as well as activities related to a culture of peace" and calling for "concrete action at the global, regional and subregional levels." It brought together Muslim and non-Muslim nations to eradicate preconceptions as to Islam and terrorism, with world leaders—including former UK Prime Minister Tony Blair, Israeli President Shimon Peres, US President George W. Bush and King Abdullah II of Jordan—attending.

In 2011, an agreement for the establishment of the Abdullah bin Abdulaziz International Centre for Interreligious and Intercultural Dialogue in Vienna was signed between the governments of Austria, Spain, and Saudi Arabia. The official opening of the centre was in November 2012, with foreign minister Saud Al Faisal as its first general secretary and Austria's former federal justice minister Claudia Bandion-Ortner as the first deputy general secretary.

=== Arab common market ===
Abdullah called for the establishment of an Arab common market in January 2011. Saudi foreign minister, Saud bin Faisal, stated that the Arab Customs Union would be ready by 2015, and that by 2017 the common market would also be in place. There have been intensive efforts to link Arab countries with a railway system and an electricity power grid. Work on the power grid project has started in some Arab countries.

=== United States ===
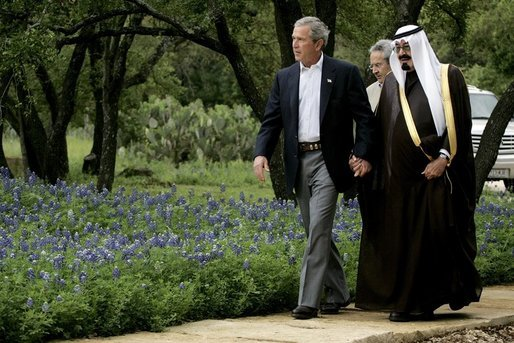
Abdullah visits the United States in April 2005.

Abdullah had long been pro-American and a longtime close ally of the United States. In October 1976, as Prince Abdullah was being trained for greater responsibility in Riyadh, he was sent to the United States to meet with President Gerald Ford. He again traveled to the United States as Crown Prince in October 1987, meeting Vice President George H. W. Bush. In September 1998, Crown Prince Abdullah made a state visit to the United States to meet in Washington with President Bill Clinton. In September 2000, he attended millennium celebrations at the United Nations in New York City. In April 2002, Crown Prince Abdullah made a state visit to the United States with President George W. Bush and he returned again in April 2005 with Bush. In April 2009, at a summit for world leaders President Barack Obama met with Abdullah, while in June 2009 he hosted President Obama in Saudi Arabia. In turn, Obama hosted the King at the White House in the same month.

Abdullah showed great support for Obama's presidency. "Thank God for bringing Obama to the presidency", he said, adding that Obama's election created "great hope" in the Muslim world. He stated, "We (the US and Saudi Arabia) spilled blood together" in Kuwait and Iraq, that Saudi Arabia valued this tremendously and that friendship could be a difficult issue that requires work, but that the United States and Saudi Arabia had done it for 70 years over three generations. "Our disagreements don't cut to the bone", he stated. He was the leading gift-giver to the US president and his office in his first two years in office, his gifts totaling more than $300,000. A ruby and diamond jewelry set, given by the king and accepted by First Lady Michelle Obama on behalf of the United States, was worth $132,000. However, according to US federal law, gifts of such nature and value are accepted "on behalf of the United States" and are considered property of the US government.

=== Iraq ===
The Bush administration ignored advice from him and Saudi foreign minister Saud Al Faisal against invading Iraq. However, other sources said that many Arab governments were only nominally opposed to the Iraq invasion because of popular hostility. Before becoming king, Prince Abdullah was thought to be completely against the US invasion of Iraq; this, however, was not the case. Riyadh provided essential support to the United States during the war and proved that "necessity does lead to some accommodations from time to time". The King expressed a complete lack of trust in Iraqi Prime Minister Nouri Al Maliki and held out little hope for improved Saudi-Iraqi relations as long as Al Maliki remained in office. Abdullah told an Iraqi official about Al Maliki, "You and Iraq are in my heart, but that man is not."

In September 2014, following the spread of the Islamic State of Iraq and the Levant (ISIL), he issued a statement, "From the cradle of revelation and the birthplace of the Prophet Muhammad, I call on leaders and scholars of the Islamic nation to carry out their duty towards God Almighty, and to stand in the face of those trying to hijack Islam and present it to the world as a religion of extremism, hatred, and terrorism, and to speak the word of truth, and not fear anybody. Our nation today is passing through a critical, historic stage, and history will be witness against those who have been the tool exploited by the enemies to disperse and tear the nation and tarnish the pure image of Islam".

=== Iran ===
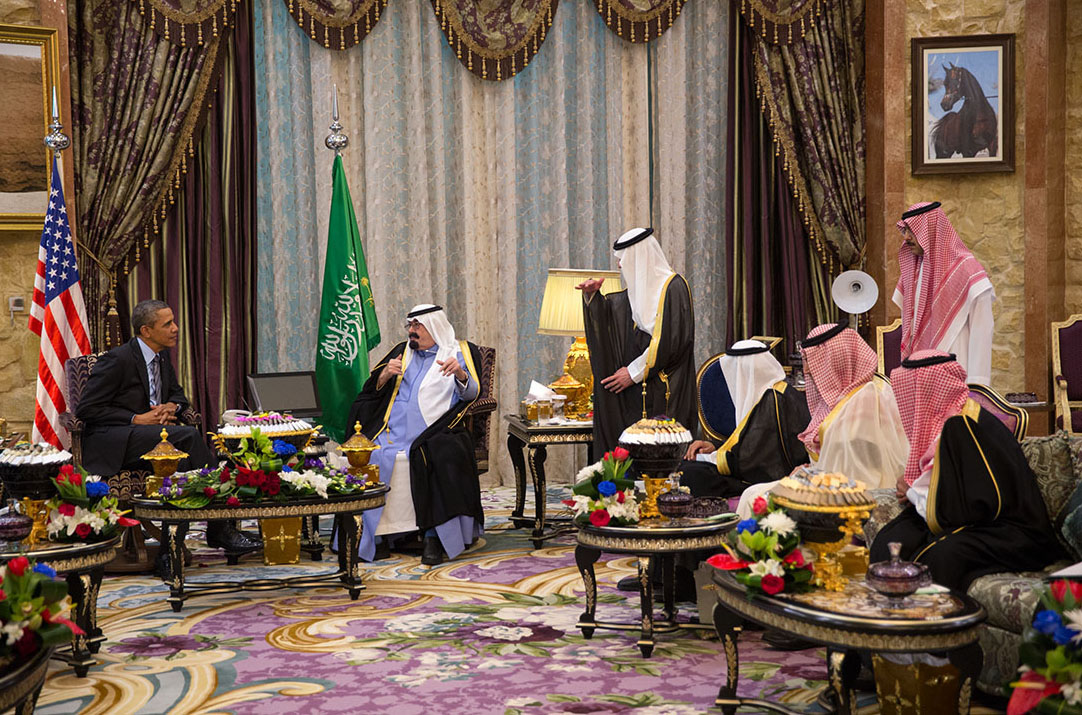
Barack Obama meets with Abdullah

In 2006, Iranian Supreme Leader Khamenei had sent his adviser Ali Akbar Velayati with a letter asking for Abdullah's agreement to establish a formal back channel of communication between the two leaders. Abdullah said he had agreed, and the channel was established, with Velayati and Saud Al Faisal as the points of contact. In the ensuing years, the King noted, the channel had never been used.

In April 2008, according to a leaked US diplomatic cable, Abdullah had told the US Ambassador to Iraq, Ryan Crocker, and General David Petraeus to "cut off the head of the snake". Saudi Arabia's Ambassador to Washington, Adel al-Jubeir, "recalled the King's frequent exhortations to the US to attack Iran" and to put an end to that country's nuclear program. Abdullah asserted that Iran was trying to set up Hezbollah-like organizations in African countries, observing that the Iranians didn't think they were doing anything wrong and didn't recognize their mistakes. He said that the Iranians "launch missiles with the hope of putting fear in people and the world". The King described his conversation with Iranian foreign minister Mottaki as "a heated exchange, frankly discussing Iran's interference in Arab affairs". When challenged by the King on Iranian meddling in Hamas affairs, Mottaki apparently protested that "these are Muslims". "No, Arabs", countered the King. "You as Persians have no business meddling in Arab matters". Abdullah said he would favor Rafsanjani in an Iranian election.

He told General Jones that Iranian internal turmoil presented an opportunity to weaken the regime—which he encouraged—but he also urged that this be done covertly, stressing that public statements in support of the reformers were counterproductive. The King assessed that sanctions could help weaken the government, but only if they are strong and sustained.

=== Bahrain ===
Saudi Arabia, by the endorsement of the Gulf Cooperation Council, sent 1,200 troops to Bahrain to protect industrial facilities, resulting in strained relations with the United States. The military personnel were part of the Peninsula Shield Force, which is stationed in Saudi Arabia, but not affiliated to one country alone.

=== Guantánamo Bay ===
In December 2010, leaked diplomatic cables published by WikiLeaks revealed that Abdullah wanted all released detainees from the Guantanamo Bay detention camp to be tracked using an implanted microchip, in a way similar to race horses. The King made the private suggestion during a meeting in Riyadh in March 2009 with White House counterterrorism adviser, John O. Brennan. Brennan replied that "horses don't have good lawyers" and that such a proposal would "face legal hurdles" in the United States.

=== China ===
Since Abdullah's visit to Beijing in January 2006, Saudi-Chinese relations have focused predominantly on energy and trade. The king's visit was the first by a Saudi head of state to China since the two countries established diplomatic ties in 1990. Bilateral trade with China has more than tripled, and China would soon be Saudi Arabia's largest importer. Saudi Arabia also committed significant investments in China, including the $8 billion Fujian refinery. Based on a WikiLeaks cable, the King told the Chinese that it was willing to effectively trade a guaranteed oil supply in return for Chinese pressure on Iran not to develop nuclear weapons.

In late March 2011, Abdullah sent Bandar bin Sultan, Secretary General of the National Security Council, to China to gain its support regarding Saudi Arabia's attitude towards the Arab Spring. In turn, lucrative arms contracts were secretly offered to China by the Kingdom. Furthermore, Abdullah believed that China as well as India were the future markets for Saudi energy.

=== Relations with other nations ===
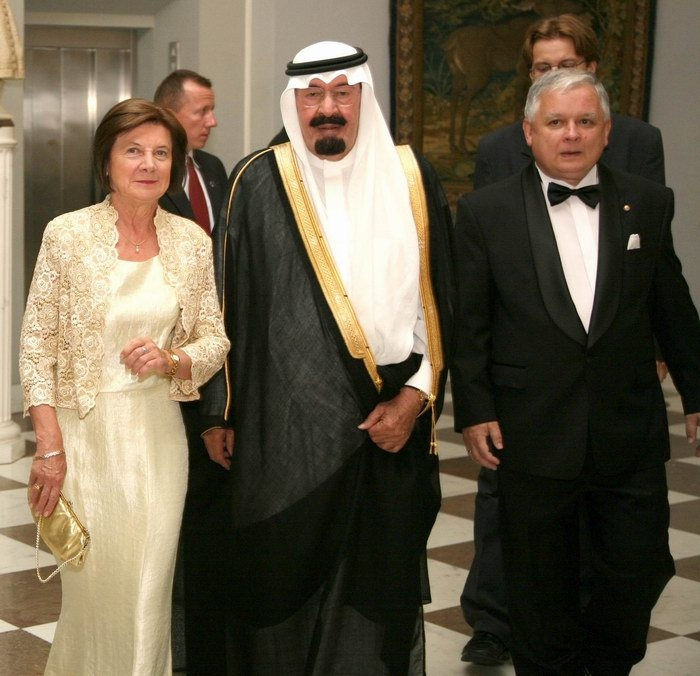
Abdullah with Polish president Lech Kaczyński

Abdullah visited Turkey in August 2006 being the first Saudi king who paid an official visit there. In November 2009, Abdullah was received by Nicolas Sarkozy, who committed various diplomatic faux pas. The diplomatic relationship Jacques Chirac had with Saudi Arabia was not evident with Sarkozy. In January 2011, the Kingdom granted asylum to the ousted Tunisian leader, Zine El-Abidine Ben Ali, under conditions of no further political involvement. According to leaked cables, Abdullah was more receptive than Crown Prince Sultan to former Yemeni President Saleh.

Abdullah supported renewed diplomatic relations with the Syrian government and Bashar al-Assad. They met in Damascus on 7 October 2009. In addition, Assad attended the opening of King Abdullah University of Science and Technology in October 2009. Relations between Syria and Saudi Arabia deteriorated as a result of the Syrian Civil War. In August 2011, Abdullah recalled the Saudi Ambassador from Damascus due to the political unrest in Syria and closed its embassy.

In December 2011, Abdullah called on leaders of the Gulf Cooperation Council to strengthen their alliance into a united "single entity" as they confront threats to national security. "I ask you today to move from a stage of cooperation to a stage of union in a single entity", Abdullah said at the opening session of a GCC meeting in Riyadh in comments aired on Saudi state television. "No doubt, you all know we are targeted in our security and stability".

=== Criticism as king ===
On 16 February 2003, Parade magazine's David Wallechinsky rated King Fahd and Crown Prince Abdullah as the second worst dictators in the world. Most of this criticism stems from the fact that most of Saudi citizens live under Sharia law, which mandates the amputation of hands as a punishment for theft and floggings for crimes like drunkenness. Execution by public beheading is common for murder, rape, drug trafficking and witchcraft, and Abdullah's policies towards the rights of women have also been criticized. In a slight rebuff to accusations of human rights violations, Saudi inmates of Najran Province sent the King well-wishes from jail and wished him a speedy recovery.

Abdullah has also been criticized for his policies on religious freedom and the Saudi government allegedly has arrested Shiite pilgrims on the Hajj. On 24 January 2007, Human Rights Watch sent an open letter to Abdullah asking him to cease religious persecution of the Ahmadi faith in Saudi Arabia. Two letters were sent in November 2006 and February 2007 asking him to remove the travel ban on critics of the Saudi government. Human Rights Watch has not yet indicated whether they have received any response to these letters.

On 30 October 2007, during a state visit to the UK, Abdullah was accused by protestors of being a "murderer" and a "torturer". Concerns were raised about the treatment of women and homosexuals by the Saudi kingdom and over alleged bribes involving arms deals between Saudi Arabia and the UK.

== Succession to the throne ==
Abdullah's heir apparent was his half-brother Crown Prince Sultan until the latter's death on 22 October 2011. The title of Crown Prince then passed to Prince Sultan's full-brother, Nayef, until his death in Geneva, Switzerland, on 16 June 2012, while undergoing medical tests for an undisclosed ailment. His third heir apparent was his half-brother Salman, who was named as crown prince on 18 June 2012, and would succeed him in 2015.

In 2006, Abdullah set up the Allegiance Council, a body that is composed of the sons and grandsons of Saudi Arabia's founder, King Abdulaziz, to vote by a secret ballot to choose future kings and crown princes. The council's mandate was not to have started until after the reigns of both Abdullah and Prince Sultan were over. It was not clear what was to happen when Prince Sultan died before the end of Abdullah's reign, leaving a question as to whether the council would vote for a new crown prince, or whether Prince Nayef would automatically fill that position. Despite such concerns, Prince Nayef was appointed Crown Prince on 27 October 2011 after consultation with the Allegiance Council by Abdullah.

In November 2010, Prince Nayef chaired a cabinet meeting because of the deterioration of the King's health. During the same month, Abdullah transferred his duties as Commander of the Saudi National Guard to his son Prince Mutaib. Abdullah is credited with building up the once largely ceremonial unit into a modern 260,000-strong force that is a counterweight to the army. The Guard, which was Abdullah's original power base, protects the royal family. This was suggested as an apparent sign that the elderly monarch was beginning to lessen some of his duties.

== Personal life ==
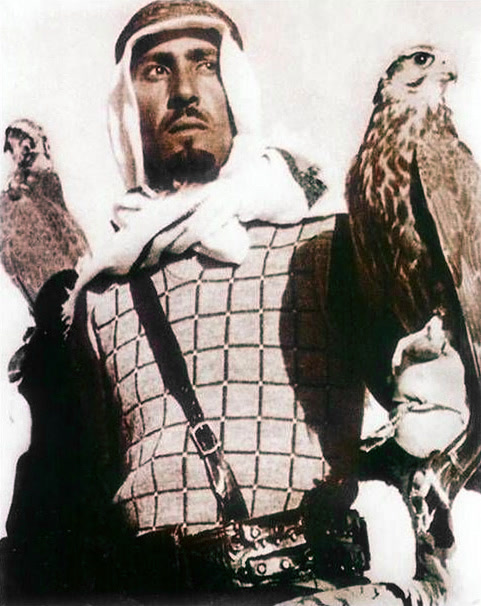
Abdullah was a falconer in his youth.

Abdullah mostly married women who had tribal backgrounds. He had 36 children with about 30 different spouses. His wives, grandchildren, and great-grandchildren have been subject to travel bans since 2017.

=== Wives ===
Abdullah married the daughters of the Al-Fayez of Bani Sakher, the Al Shaalan of Anizah, and Al Jarbah of the Iraqi branch of the Shammar tribe. He had about 30 wives, and fathered 36 children.

Munira bint Abdullah Al Sheikh was the mother of King Abdullah's eldest living son, Prince Khaled. One of Abdullah's wives, Aida Fustuq, was the sister of Rifaat al-Assad's wife. Abdullah had two children with Aida: Adila and Abdulaziz. They divorced later. Another wife, Sultana bint Abdulaziz bin Ahmed, was from the Al Sudairi clan. King Abdullah also married Jawahir bint Ali Hussein from the Al Jiluwi clan, with whom he had two children, Princess Anoud and Prince Saud. Tathi bint Mishan Al Faisal Al Jarba gave birth to another six of his children, including Prince Mishaal, Prince Turki, and Princess Oraib. Another wife was Malka bint Saud bin Zaid Al Jarba Al Choumri, and they had three children: Prince Saad, Princess Sahab and Prince Sultan. Haifa Al Muhanna was the mother of Abdullah's youngest child, Prince Bandar. A prominent wife of the King, Hessa bint Trad Al Shaalan, is the mother of Prince Faisal and Princess Abeer among others.

=== Sons ===
Abdullah had thirty-six children, sixteen of whom are male. His eldest son, Mutaib, died at a young age. His second eldest son, Prince Khalid, was deputy commander of the Saudi Arabian National Guard West until 1992. His third son, Prince Mutaib, is former commander and former minister of the National Guard. Prince Mishaal was governor of the Makkah Province between 2013 and 2015. Prince Abdulaziz was the King's former Syria adviser and was deputy foreign affairs minister from 2011 to 2015. Prince Faisal was the head of the Saudi Arabian Red Crescent Society. Abdullah's seventh son, Prince Turki, was a pilot in the Royal Saudi Air Force and served as governor of the Riyadh Province from 2014 to 2015). His youngest son, Prince Bandar, was born in 1999, when Abdullah was about 75 years old.

In October 2015, King Abdullah's son Prince Majid was arrested in Los Angeles on suspicion of "forcing oral copulation", amid allegations that he had been unlawfully imprisoning, threatening, sexually harassing, and assaulting employees while under the influence of cocaine and alcohol. He was released on bail, and felony charges were dropped for lack of evidence; a civil suit filed by three housekeepers continued. Another son, Mohammed, is married to Nouf bint Nayef, a daughter of Prince Nayef bin Abdulaziz and Maha bint Mohammed Al Sudairi.

=== Daughters ===
Abdullah had twenty daughters. Princess Adila married Faisal bin Abdullah, who served as minister of education. She is one of the few Saudi princesses with a semi-public role, and is a known advocate of a woman's right to drive. She was also known as "her father's public face". On 6 June 2011, Abdullah's daughter Princess Sahab (born 1993) married Khalid bin Hamad Al Khalifa, son of Bahraini King Hamad bin Isa Al Khalifa. Another daughter, Abeer, is the wife of Fahd bin Turki Al Saud. Sara bint Abdullah married Turki bin Talal and they had one son, Abdulaziz. She later married Fahd bin Badr, with whom she has five children.

One of Abdullah's daughters, Noura, died in 1990 in a car accident near Riyadh airport. She was married to Sultan bin Turki Al Saud. Abdullah's daughter Fayza is the mother of Prince Saud bin Abdulaziz bin Nasser Al Saud, who was accused of murdering his servant Bandar Abdulaziz in London in 2010. His daughter Hayfa was featured on the cover of Vogue Arabia magazine's June 2018 issue. Salman bin Abdulaziz bin Salman, a member of the Al Kabir branch of Al Saud, is married to a daughter of King Abdullah, Oraib, who is the full sister of Turki bin Abdullah. Another daughter, Seeta, was married to Faisal bin Thamir, a son of Thamir bin Abdulaziz Al Saud.

From his marriage to Al Anoud Al Fayez (arranged when she was 15 without her having ever met him), whom he later divorced, Abdullah had four daughters: Sahar, Maha, Hala and Jawahir. They have been under house arrest for several years, and are not allowed to leave the country. According to an interview with an American doctor for the family, Maha and Hala were regularly forcibly sedated with various drugs, including Valium, Ativan, Xanax, and Ambien. Their mental and physical health reportedly severely deteriorated. After media releases in March 2014, Sahar and Jawahir received no food or clean water for 25 days, lost 10 kg each and their mother carried out weekly protests in front of the Saudi Arabian embassy in London. They spoke and released a video while under house arrest, pleading for help from the international community. After 2014, media reports of their condition dried up. Princess Hala's health severely declined due to her drug and alcohol dependence, and she reportedly lost most of her hair and became incoherent. She died on 30 September 2021 at age 47, and there was no mention about the cause of her death. Funeral prayer for her was performed after evening prayers at the Grand Mosque in Mecca.

=== Illness and death ===
The King had curtailed his activities from June 2010 with no clear explanation. Diplomats said there had been uncertainty about the extent of his health problems since Abdullah canceled a visit to France. In a television appearance in which he was seen to use a cane, Abdullah said he was in good health but had something "bothering" him. In a visit by US diplomats to Saudi Arabia in April 2014, he was seen connected to breathing tubes during talks, indicating increasing health problems.

From 2010 to 2012 Abdullah had four back surgeries. The first two surgeries were in New York, one in 2010 for a slipped disk and a blood clot pressing on nerves in his back and a second to stabilize vertebrae in 2011. The third surgery was in Riyadh in 2011, and the last one was also in Riyadh on 17 November 2012.

In November 2010, Abdullah's back problems came to light in the media. He had an "accumulation of blood" around the spinal cord. He suffered from a herniated disc and was told to rest by doctors. To maintain the Kingdom's stability, Crown Prince Sultan returned from Morocco during the King's absence. The King was admitted to NewYork–Presbyterian Hospital after a blood clot complicated a slipped disc and underwent successful back surgery. The lead surgeon was Muhammad Zaka, who probably removed the herniated disk and performed a lumbar fusion. He subsequently had another successful surgery in which surgeons "stabilized a number of vertebras". He left the hospital on 22 December 2010 and convalesced at The Plaza in New York City. On 22 January 2011, he left the United States for Morocco, and returned to the Kingdom on 23 February 2011.

Abdullah left Saudi Arabia on "special leave" on 27 August 2012. Al Quds reported that he had an operation at Mount Sinai Hospital, New York, on or before 4 September 2012, following a heart attack. However, there was no official report on this alleged operation—instead, it was announced that the King went on a private trip to Morocco, where he was known to frequent. He returned to Saudi Arabia from Morocco on 24 September. Nearly two months later, in November 2012, Abdullah underwent another back surgery in Riyadh and left hospital on 13 December 2012.

On 2 January 2015, Abdullah was hospitalized in Riyadh for pneumonia and died on 23 January at the age of 90. In accordance with Islamic tradition, his funeral was held the same day, a public ceremony at the Grand Mosque of Riyadh before burial in an unmarked grave at the Al Oud cemetery. Three days of national mourning were declared, in which flags would fly at half-mast. Flags were also flown half-mast at Buckingham Palace and Westminster Abbey in London.

=== Influence ===
In 2012, Abdullah was named as the most influential Muslim among 500 Muslims for the previous four years. In December 2012, Forbes named him as the seventh-most-powerful figure in its list of the "World's Most Powerful People" for 2012, being the sole Arab in the top ten.

== Wealth ==
In 2011, the financial magazine Forbes estimated the documentable wealth of King Abdullah and his immediate family at US$21 billion, making him one of the world's richest monarchs. One estimate places his wealth at US$18 billion, making him the third-wealthiest head of state in the world.

King Abdullah was an expert equestrian in his youth. His stables were considered the largest in Saudi Arabia, with over 1,000 horses spread throughout five divisions led by his son Prince Mutaib. The King also owned Janadria Farm, a large complex located in the suburbs of Riyadh.

For holidays, the King maintained a large palace complex with several residential compounds in Casablanca, Morocco. It is equipped with two heliports and is surrounded by large mansions on 133 acres of vegetation.

While still Crown Prince, Abdullah paid for the separation surgery of a pair of Polish conjoined twins, which took place at the King Abdulaziz Medical City in Riyadh on 3 January 2005.

He donated $50 million in cash and $10 million worth of relief materials for the 2008 Sichuan earthquake in China.

He donated $10 billion to the endowment fund of the King Abdullah University of Science and Technology in May 2008.

== Honours and awards ==
Styles of King Abdullah
- Reference style: Custodian of the Two Holy Mosques

Abdullah received a number of international high orders. Most notably, he was an honored knight of the strictly Roman Catholic Order of the Golden Fleece (the Spanish branch), which caused some controversy.

In April 2012, he was awarded by the United Nations a gold medal for his contributions to intercultural understanding and peace initiatives.

=== Foreign honours ===
- Honorary Grand Commander of the Order of Loyalty to the Crown of Malaysia (1982)
- Honorary Grand Commander of the Order of the Defender of the Realm (2003)

== Notes ==
Abdullah House of Saud Born: 1 August 1924 Died: 23 January 2015
Regnal titles
| Preceded by Fahd | King of Saudi Arabia; 2005–2015 | Succeeded by Salman |
Saudi Arabian royalty
| Preceded by Fahd | Crown Prince of Saudi Arabia; 1982–2005 | Succeeded by Sultan |
