= Norah Al Faiz =

Saudi deputy education minister (born 1956)

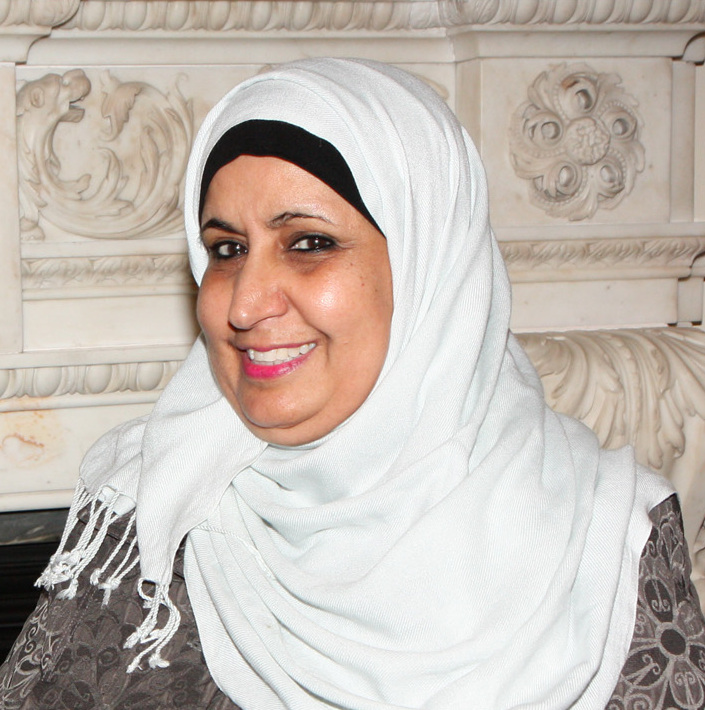
- Norah Al Faiz in 2012

Vice Minister of Education
- In office February 2009 – April 2015
- Monarchs: Abdullah; Salman
- Prime Minister: King Abdullah; King Salman
- Preceded by: Khalid bin Abdullah bin Mohammed bin Muqrin Al Mishari Al Saud

Personal details
- Born: Norah bint Abdullah bin Musaed Al Fayez; 1956 (age 69–70) Shaqra, Saudi Arabia
- Education: King Saud University; Utah State University

Norah bint Abdullah Al Faiz (Arabic: نورة بنت عبد الله الفايز), also spelled Noura Al Fayez, (born 1956) is the first woman to hold a cabinet-level office in Saudi Arabia. She was vice minister of education from 2009 to 2015.

== Early life and education ==
Norah Al Faiz was born in Shaqra in 1956. Al Faiz received a bachelor of arts degree in sociology from King Saud University in Riyadh in 1979. She also received a master's degree in Instructional Technologies from Utah State University in 1982.

== Career ==
Upon returning to Saudi Arabia, Al Faiz worked as a teacher. She became head principal of the girls' section at Prince Alwaleed bin Talal’s Kingdom Schools.

Later, Al Faiz served as the head of ministry of education’s educational technology center, and a lecturer and head of the training board of the ministry’s administration institute from 1983 to 1988. In 1993, she became ministry's educational supervisor for girls’ private education. She was also appointed the director general of women's section of the institute of public administration in 1993, which she held until 2009. In addition, she worked as an associate professor in the department of education techniques from 1989 to 1995 at the College of Education, King Saud University.

Al Faiz was named deputy minister of education in charge of women’s affairs in February 2009 and is the first woman to direct girls’ education in Saudi Arabia. She said that her appointment was "a source of pride for all women." Al Faiz was dismissed from the post in late April 2015.

=== Reactions to her appointment ===
Saudi journalist Khalid Almeena stated "People are very excited about this [her appointment]." Prince Talal considered her appointment as part of a larger process of change, initiated by King Abdullah even before his coronation, when he was still crown prince. He further stated that this appointment was good news for men even more than women, and was a call for women to take their natural place in society.

Faisal bin Abdallah, education minister, also welcomed her appointment as a deputy. He told that the Saudi education ministry was proud to be the first to have a woman in a ministry post, and that women help men in numerous areas, including in education.

However, Ali Alyami argued that her appointment was largely a move to make democratic reformers ineffective in and outside the country with the goal of reducing global criticism over the Saudi segregationist policies and oppression of women. For him, this move strengthens and reinforces King Abdullah’s position in the country. Shortly, he thought that her appointment led to a short-lived positive impact on the psyche and ethos of Saudi society, but it did not last for a long-time.

== Views ==
Her Al Watan interview seems to support Ali Alyami's views. Four months after her appointment, in June 2009, Norah Al Faiz told that "the time was still too soon for [the] topic ”of sports for girls." Since her photo was published in the same daily, showing her face without niqab, she angrily reacted and said "The publication of my photo upset me immensely ... [I]t is well known that I am a Saudi woman from Najd, and thus I wear a niqab. I will never allow the publishing of my photo in newspapers and I will not accept that it be put up anywhere."

== Personal life ==
Al Faiz is married and has three sons and two daughters. In April 2012, Utah State University granted her an honorary degree.

In 2009, she was regarded as one of the 500 influential Muslims by Georgetown University's center for Muslim-Christian understanding.

== See also ==
- Walid Fitaihi
