= Fahda bint Asi Al Shammari =

Arab royal woman (died 1934)

- Died: 1934
- Spouses: Saud bin Abdulaziz, Emir of Jabal Shammar (m. 1916; died 1920) Abdulaziz bin Abdulrahman, King of Saudi Arabia (m. 1922)
- Issue: List: Mishaal bin Saud Al Rashid; Abdulaziz bin Saud Al Rashid; King Abdullah bin Abdulaziz; Nouf bint Abdulaziz Al Saud; Seeta bint Abdulaziz Al Saud
Names
- Fahda bint Asi bin Shuraim Al Shammari
- House: Al Rashid (by marriage); Al Saud (by marriage)
- Father: Asi bin Shuraim Al Shammari
- Mother: marzogah bint saied al ali al shammari مرزوقة بنت صايد آل علي الشمري

Fahda bint Asi bin Shuraim Al Shammari (Arabic: فهدة بنت العاصي بن شريم الشمري) (died 1934) was an Arab woman of the Shammar tribe who was first married to her kinsman Saud bin Abdulaziz Al Rashid, Emir of Jabal Shammar, and later to King Abdulaziz of Saudi Arabia. By her first marriage, she had two sons: Abdulaziz and Mishaal. By her second marriage, she was the mother of King Abdullah, Princess Nouf, and Princess Seeta.

== Early life ==
Fahda was a member of the Abde section of the powerful Shammar tribe. She was the daughter of Asi bin Shuraim Al Shammari, who was the sheikh of the southern part of the tribe. Fahda had three brothers, Mutani, Sultan and Ghazi, and one sister, Shima.

== Personal life ==
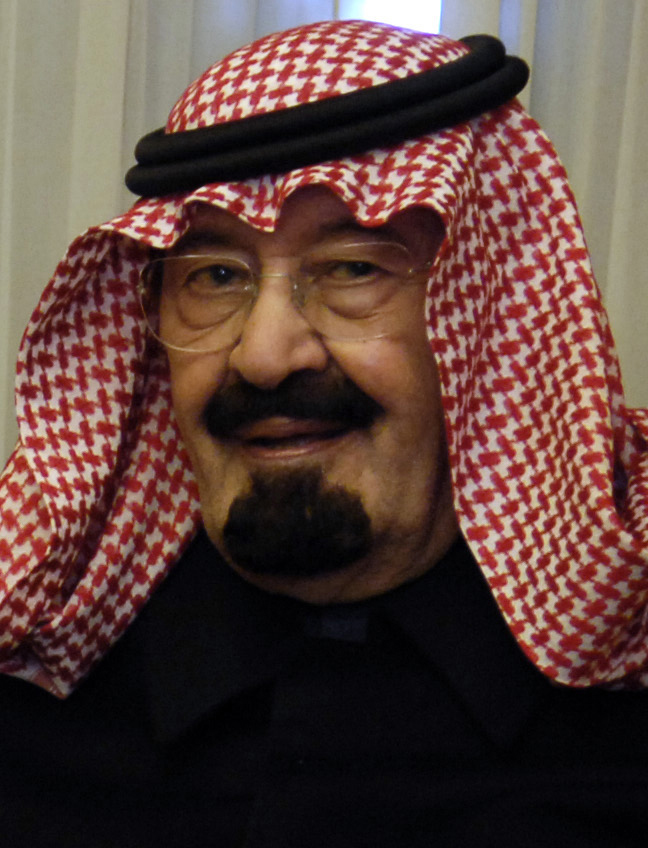
King Abdullah, Fahda's son from her second marriage

Fahda bint Asi first married her kinsman and the tenth Al Rashid Emir, Saud bin Abdulaziz Al Rashid. Fahda had two children with Emir Saud: Abdulaziz and Mishaal. They lived in Barzan Palace, Hail. In 1920 one of Fahda and Saud's cousins, Abdullah bin Talal, assassinated Saud.

Following her husband's killing, Fahda married Abdulaziz Al Saud in 1922 becoming his eighth spouse. Abdulaziz adopted Fahda's two sons following the marriage.

Fahda was one of the three Al Rashid women married to Abdulaziz. The others were Noura bint Sibhan, former spouse of Emir Muhammad bin Talal Al Rashid and Jawaher, daughter of Emir Muhammad bin Talal. The reason for these marriages is thought to build a truce with the Rashidis or to make them loyal elements in the country. In other words, Abdulaziz married them to eliminate the potential problems caused by the Rashidis. In addition, Fahda's father, Asi bin Shuraim Al Shammari, became one of the most prominent supporters of King Abdulaziz, and joined his forces in several battles during the formation of Saudi Arabia, including the Battle of Sabilla in 1929.

Fahda and King Abdulaziz had three children. Her first child from this marriage was Abdullah, the sixth king of Saudi Arabia. Her other two children were Nouf and Seeta. Fahda died in 1934.

== Legacy ==
King Abdullah inaugurated the Fahda bint Asi Al Shuraim Secondary School for Qualification in Boskora, Morocco, in August 2009. The school is made up of eighteen classrooms for general training, nine science classrooms, three classrooms for preparation, a library, and special areas for sports.
