= Nouf bint Abdulaziz Al Saud =

Saudi royal and philanthropist (died 2015)

- Died: August 2015; Riyadh, Saudi Arabia
- Spouse: Abdullah bin Mohammed Al Saud
- Issue: Faisal bin Abdullah Al Saud
Names
- Nouf bint Abdulaziz bin Abdulrahman Al Saud
- House: Al Saud
- Father: King Abdulaziz
- Mother: Fahda bint Asi bin Shuraim Al Shammari

Nouf bint Abdulaziz Al Saud (Arabic: نوف بنت عبد العزيز آل سعود Nūf bint ʿAbd al ʿAzīz Āl Suʿūd; died August 2015) was a Saudi royal. She was known for her patronage of several exhibitions in Saudi Arabia.

== Biography ==
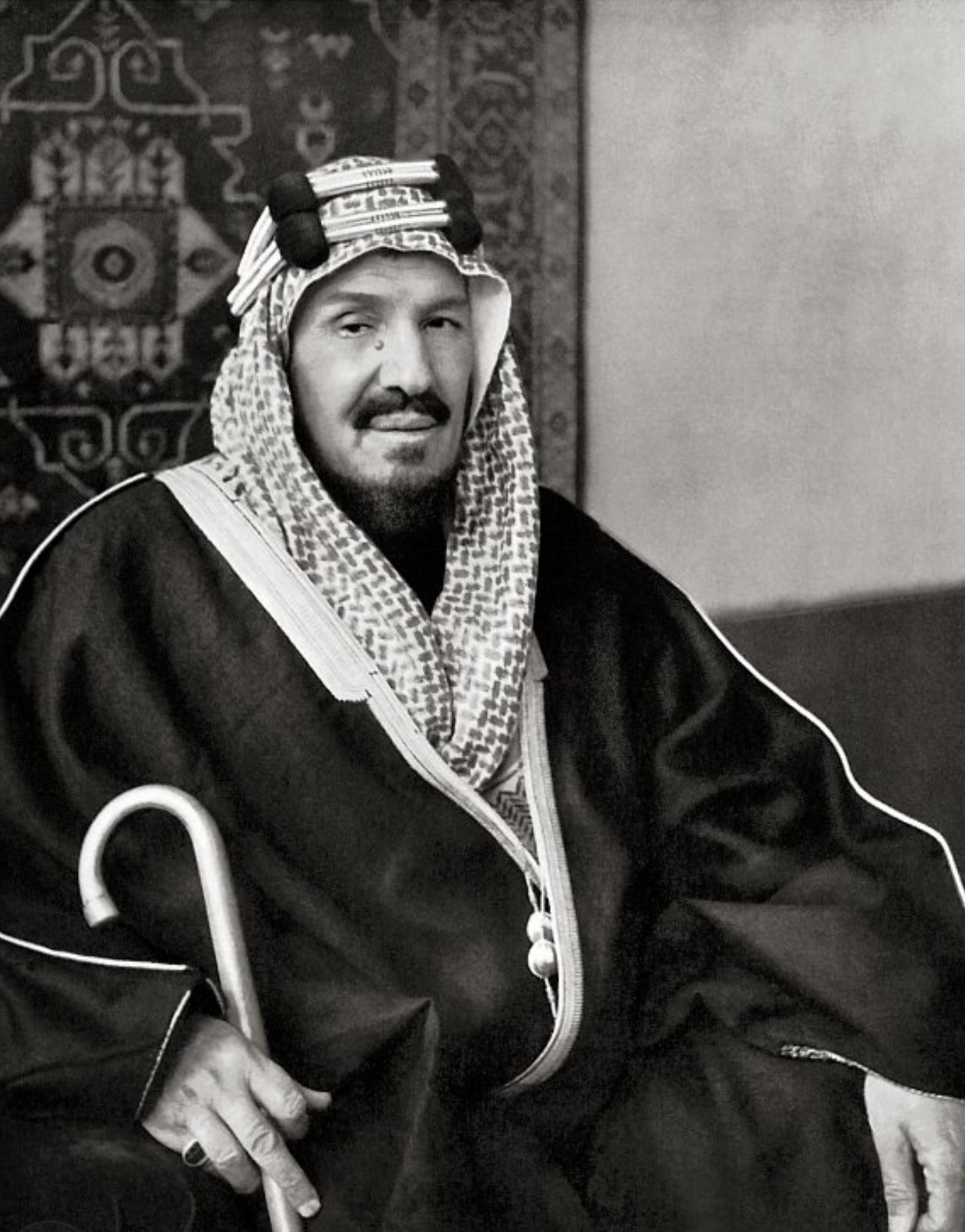
Nouf's father, King Abdulaziz

Nouf bint Abdulaziz was one of three children of King Abdulaziz and Fahda bint Asi Al Shuraim. Her mother, Fahda, belonged to the Abde section of the Shammar tribe. She was the daughter of Asi bin Shuraim Al Shammari, who was the sheikh of the southern part of the tribe. After her husband, Saud bin Abdulaziz Al Rashid, the last emir of the Rashidi dynasty, was killed by his cousin in 1920, Fahda married Abdulaziz. Nouf had two full-siblings: King Abdullah and Princess Seeta.

Nouf bint Abdulaziz married Abdullah bin Mohammed Al Saud, a descendants of Saud bin Faisal, an uncle of King Abdulaziz. One of her children was Faisal bin Abdullah Al Saud, Saudi education minister from 2009 to 2013. Nouf bint Abdulaziz funded several exhibitions one of which was the Khalid Exhibition at the King Abdulaziz Historical Center in Riyadh in May 2010. The exhibition covered the publications, photographs, books, films and some private belongings of King Khalid. She died in August 2015.
