= Saud bin Abdulaziz =

Saud bin Abdulaziz may refer to:

- Saud bin Abdulaziz Al Saud (1748-1814) - Ruler of Diriyah Emirate (r.1803-1814)
- Saud of Saudi Arabia - King of Saudi Arabia (r.1953-1964) and Prime Minister of Saudi Arabia (1953-1954; 1960-1962)
- Saud bin Abdulaziz Al Rashid - Emir of Jabal Shammar (r.1908-1920)
