= Sultan bin Hamoud Al Rashid =

Emir of Jabal Shammar (r. 1906-1908)

Emir of Jabal Shammar
- Reign: 31 December 1906 – January 1908
- Predecessor: Mutaib bin Abdulaziz
- Successor: Saud bin Hamoud
- Born: 1870; Ha'il
- Died: January 1908 (aged 37–38); Ha'il
- Spouse: Moudi bint Sabhan Al Sabhan
- Issue: Ali bin Sultan Al Rashid; Abta bint Sultan Al Rashid
Names
- Sultan bin Hamoud bin Obaid bin Ali Al Rashid
- House: House of Rashid
- Father: Hamoud bin Obaid Al Rashid

Sultan bin Hamoud Al Rashid (Arabic: سلطان بن حمود الرشيد, romanized: Sultān bin Ḥammūd Āl Rašīd; 1870–January 1908) was the eighth Emir of Jabal Shammar from 1906 until 1908.

== Early life ==
Sultan was born around 1870, the third son of Hamoud bin Obaid Al Rashid.

== Career ==
In June 1905, disgruntled by the rule of the Emir, Abdulaziz bin Mutaib Al Rashid, Sultan seized control of Jauf al Amir and its surroundings. He complained to the Ottoman Sultan about Ibn Rashid, but without result. On 12 April, 1906, Emir Abdulaziz was killed in the Battle of Rawdat Muhanna, succeeded by his eldest son (and Sultan's nephew), the barely 18-year-old Mutaib bin Abdulaziz. Despite Mutaib's popularity with the people of Ha'il, he was not supported by the Obaid branch of the Al Rashid family. Sultan and two of his brothers, Saud and Faisal, began planning to murder the Emir and other members of the House of Rashid in order to seize control. According to Gertrude Bell, Sultan was unwilling to kill Emir Mutaib, though Saud told him that whoever killed him would become Emir. In late December 1906, the brothers invited the Emir, his brothers, and cousins on a hunting trip. There, Mutaib was killed by Sultan; Talal bin Nayef Al Rashid (the father of Muhammad, the twelfth Emir and Abdullah) was killed by Saud, and Mutaib's brother Mishaal was killed by Faisal. Sultan asked who the people of Ha'il support, and they said Muhammad, the remaining full brother of Mutaib, who was then killed in Ha'il. The only son of Abdulaziz who was not killed in the bloodshed was Saud, half-brother of the murdered Emir, who was taken to Medina. Sultan married Saud's mother, Moudi and had a son, Ali, and a daughter, Abta.

Upon becoming Emir, Sultan reinitiated conflicts with Ibn Saud, who had made peace with Mutaib. Sultan allied with the Emir of Buraydah, Muhammad bin Abdullah Al Muhanna, and the Sheikh of Mutair, Faisal al-Duwaish, against Ibn Saud, though this was not enough to quell the growing Wahhabi power, and they were defeated at the Battle of Tarfiya. Sultan and his brothers Saud and Faisal had a falling out and he became increasingly unpopular in Ha'il. The three agreed in 1908 for Saud to become Emir and for Sultan to leave for Tayma. When he left, Saud realized that Sultan had emptied the treasury for himself, so Sultan was tracked down at Mogug and killed.
