= Faisal bin Abdullah Al Saud (born 1978) =

Saudi royal and former government official (born 1978)

Head of the Saudi Arabian Red Crescent Society
- In office: 20 November 2006 – 18 July 2016
- Successor: Mohammad Al Qassem
- Monarch: Abdullah
- Born: 23 July 1978 (age 48)
Names
- Faisal bin Abdullah bin Abdulaziz
- House: Al Saud
- Father: King Abdullah
- Mother: Hessa bint Trad Al Shaalan
- Education: American University in London

Faisal bin Abdullah Al Saud (Arabic: فيصل بن عبدالله آل سعود, romanized: Fayṣal bin ʿAbdullāh Āl Saʿūd; born 23 July 1978) is a member of the House of Saud, one of the grandsons of Saudi Arabia's founder King Abdulaziz, and was head of the Saudi Arabian Red Crescent Society. He has been in detention since March 2020.

== Early life and education ==
Prince Faisal was born on 23 July 1978. He is the fifth son of King Abdullah who ruled Saudi Arabia from 2005 to his death in January 2015. His mother is Hessa bint Trad Al Shaalan, who is the most prominent wife of King Abdullah. Prince Faisal has six blood siblings, including Mansour bin Abdullah. One of his full sisters is Abeer bint Abdullah who is married to Fahd bin Turki.

Prince Faisal attended Royal Military Academy Sandhurst, but he could not complete his education and dropped. He graduated from the American University in London in 1983. He also attended and completed a special course in security and intelligence studies with the British Army in 1988.

== Career ==
Faisal bin Abdullah was one of Crown Prince Abdullah's advisors. In 1991, he was appointed director general of the Department of Documents and Information at the National Guard and served there until 2000. Faisal then served as an advisor to the head of General Intelligence from 2000 to 2006. He was named as the head of the Saudi Arabian Red Crescent Society with the rank of minister on 20 November 2006. He was removed from the office on 18 July 2016 without any official announcement. He was replaced by Mohammad Al Qassem in the post.

Faisal bin Abdullah also has some business activities.

=== Controversy and detention ===
Faisal bin Abdullah filed a lawsuit due to perceived defamation against one of Al Watan journalists, Saleh al Shehy in June 2007.

He was arrested in November 2017 together with other senior members of the royal family. He was freed in December 2017 following a financial settlement, but an arbitrary travel ban was imposed on him.

It was reported by Human Rights Watch in May 2020 that he had been detained again on 27 March 2020. He was taken by the Saudi security forces from his house near Riyadh.

== Personal life ==
Former wife of Faisal bin Abdullah was Noura bint Ahmed bin Abdulaziz, a daughter of Ahmed bin Abdulaziz. They have three children. Later they divorced.

In 2001, Faisal bin Abdullah married Fahda Hussain Abdulrahman Al Athel. In 2016, they divorced.

While he was in the United States in 2015, Faisal bin Abdullah survived a heart attack.

In 2022, it was reported that Faisal bin Abdullah was "foot-dragging" in connection with the sale of a $16.8 million mansion in Beverly Hills, which he bought with his then-wife Fahda Hussain Abdulrahman Al Athel.
