= Mishaal Al Saud =

Mishaal Al Saud can refer to number of members of Saudi royal family:

- Mishaal bin Abdulaziz Al Saud (1926–2017)
- Mishaal bin Abdullah Al Saud (born 1970)
- Mishaal bin Saud al-Rashid Al Saud (born 1918)
- Mishaal bin Saud Al Saud (born 1940)
