= Abdulaziz bin Turki Al Saud (born 1986) =

Saudi prince, businessman, entrepreneur and investor (born 1986)

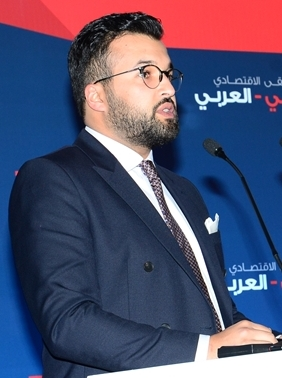
- Abdulaziz in 2015
- Born: 6 December 1986 (age 39); Los Angeles, California
- Education: King Fahd University of Petroleum and Minerals; Coventry University, London Campus
- Occupations: Chairman of Eleventh Holding; Vice President of Smantah Group
- Parents: Turki bin Talal Al Saud (father); Sara bint Abdullah bin Abdulaziz Al Saud (mother)
- Relatives: Talal bin Abdulaziz Al Saud (paternal grandfather); King Abdullah of Saudi Arabia (maternal grandfather); Al-Waleed bin Talal Al Saud (paternal uncle)
- House: House of Saud

Abdulaziz bin Turki Abdulaziz Al Saud (Arabic: عبدالعزيز بن تركي بن طلال بن عبدالعزيز آل سعود; born 6 December 1986) is a Saudi prince, businessman, entrepreneur and investor. He was born in Los Angeles, raised in Riyadh and educated in Saudi Arabia, United States and the United Kingdom. He is a grandson of late King Abdullah of Saudi Arabia and a nephew of the international business leader Al-Waleed bin Talal.

== Early life and education ==
Abdulaziz bin Turki bin Talal is the only son of Prince Turki bin Talal. His mother is Sara bint Abdullah, a daughter of former ruler, King Abdullah. His parents divorced, and his mother later married Fahd bin Badr.

Abdulaziz holds a bachelor's degree in industrial finance from King Fahd University of Petroleum and Minerals and an MBA in oil and gas management from Coventry University, United Kingdom.

== Career ==
Abdulaziz started his career at Citigroup in Los Angeles followed by working for a construction company in China, which he later purchased and brought to Saudi Arabia.

Abdulaziz is the chairman of Eleventh Holding Company, a diversified Saudi-based conglomerate, and vice president of Smantah Group headquartered in Riyadh, Kingdom of Saudi Arabia.

Abdulaziz spends considerable time engaging university-enrolled students with discussions and seminars on entrepreneurship and international business in the Kingdom of Saudi Arabia, the United Kingdom, and the United States].

In 2015, Prince Abdulaziz delivered a talk on "Growth in the Gulf and Entrepreneurship" at the London School of Economics.

He has been investing in Technology and Financial start-ups, in line with the Saudi Vision 2030, as supported by his uncle Prince Mohammed bin Salman. He is the Chairman of Aseer Investment Company with an aim to highlight the country's cultural and natural attractions for tourists.

== Philanthropy ==
On 15 May 2015, with support from one of his former academic supervisors, Abdulaziz offered financial assistance to establish an annual scholarship programme towards five Masters/MBA full-time postgraduates students in Coventry University London Campus (CULC). The official launch of the scholarship programme took place in a formal reception in the House of Commons.
