= The Center for Democracy and Human Rights in Saudi Arabia =

United States based non-profit organization

The Center for Democracy and Human Rights in Saudi Arabia (CDHR) is a United States based non-profit organization established to promote transformation of the existing Saudi autocratic institutions to a system whereby all Saudi citizens are empowered to chart a peaceful, prosperous, tolerant and safe future for themselves and for their country. CDHR was founded by Dr. Ali Alyami, executive director, in May 2004.

== Activities ==
Provides information and analysis of Saudi events and policies via its website and 5,000 strong newsletter recipients worldwide. CDHR's director analyzes Saudi news and policies for the benefit of the readers who would otherwise take the highly censored Saudi news for face value.

Operates a Blog, Twitter and Facebook accounts to spread information and engage readers in open discussions about issues that affect them, but which they cannot initiate from or discuss openly in Saudi Arabia.

Organizes public and official conferences and round table discussions in which speakers present current different prospective and analysis about Saudi policies, US-Saudi relations and the Saudi role in the financing and spread of its austere brand of Islam, Wahhabism.

Monitors and conducts research on human rights, women's and minority rights, rights of expatriates, religious tolerance and freedom of worship and expression.

Networks with other groups, think tanks and Congressional staffers in Washington, to provide them with information about Saudi Arabia as it relates to the US and its interests.

Networks with pro-democracy and human rights groups in the US, Europe and individuals in the Arab and Muslim communities.

Provides presentations at conferences and other events, utilizing the knowledge of the Executive Director as a native of Saudi Arabia and an expert familiar with its history, composition, and peoples.

== Issues ==
The Center for Democracy and Human Rights in Saudi Arabia focuses on five main issues regarding the Kingdom of Saudi Arabia.

- Political reform
- Religious freedom
- Women's rights
- Minority rights
- Economic reform

== Political reform ==
The center supports the promotion of a democratically governed Saudi Arabia. Due to its influence on an estimated 1.2 billion Muslims around the world, and its location with relation to the world's oil market, The Center believes that "Saudi Arabia cannot be disregarded or surrendered to an absolute monarchy that encourages the oppression of women and religious minorities, and fosters domestic extremism and international terrorism." By creating a constitutional, democratic government paired with the rule of law, CDHR feels that a more prosperous and united Saudi Arabia will emerge, which is not only for the best interest for the Saudi people, but the United States and all other democratic societies.

In order to do this, CDHR has consulted with democratic and constitutional experts and has devoted itself to creating a "blueprint" for a new democratic political structure in the Kingdom of Saudi Arabia. They have proposed the following steps in doing so:

The holding of full and fair, internationally verified municipal elections as a first step towards the complete democratization of the Saudi political system. Regional and national elections are to follow local elections. All citizens of voting age should have the right to vote, regardless of gender, race, ethnicity or religious orientation, at all levels of the democratic process (locally, regionally, and nationally). Representation at all levels of government is to be directly proportional to the percentage of the vote obtained in the elections by any candidate or party. To ensure fair political representation of both individuals and regions, the number of seats available for each body of government should be prescribed by the Constitution and directly related to the results of a regularly and independently held National Census. The new political structure is to be designed so that each of the five main regions enjoys equal representation at the national level in a legislative body.

A non-sectarian national Constitution should be voted on and approved in a referendum by all citizens of voting age and thereafter upheld by a politically independent Constitutional Court. The national Constitution should be amendable only by an affirmative vote of an increased majority in the national representative bodies, followed by regional ratification. Military, police, information agencies and militias, both regional and national, should be under civilian authority and employed only for national or regional security and defense priorities and for the protection of citizens’ rights and safety. All positions of public service, whether civilian or military, shall have limited terms of office and restricted mandates, and are to be regulated by the country’s regional laws and national Constitution where the national Constitution shall at all times take precedence over all regional laws.

All levels of Saudi Government should adhere to highest standards of transparency and accountability. The holy shrines in Makkah (Mecca) and Madinah (Medina) should have their own elected governing council with representatives from all Muslim countries. This council’s mandate will be limited to religious affairs and it will have no political influence in the affairs of the Saudi state.

By making these changes, The Center for Democracy and Human Rights in Saudi Arabia believes that the people in the Kingdom of Saudi Arabia will embrace democracy, a free market economy, tolerance, and in turn share in extreme productivity economically and socially.

== Religious freedom ==
Religious freedom is an important issue for the center. It is forbidden to practice any other religion in The Kingdom other than Wahhabism, which is the state-sanctioned interpretation of Islam. Representative of an estimated one percent of Muslims in Saudi Arabia, Wahhabism is considered by most to be and extremist sect of Islam that openly sponsors terrorism and the persecution of other religions. While modest efforts have been made by the Saudi government to modernize their strict adherence to Wahhabism and to try to separate themselves from the negative aspects of this brand of Islam(2008 Interfaith Conference. Madrid, Spain), CDHR believes that “unless the international community takes concrete measures to discourage the Saudi institutions from promoting religious hatred in Saudi Arabia and the rest of the Arab world, the consequences could be catastrophic.”

== Women's rights ==
Women in Saudi Arabia are less represented in political, social, economic and scientific fields than women in any other Arab or Muslim country. Women were barred from participating in the only municipal elections in the history of the Saudi State in 2005. They are prohibited from studying certain subjects in schools, such as chemistry and biology. They may not legally drive and must obtain “permission” from a male “guardian” to travel within or outside the country. Women must ride in the back of public buses, even when the buses are empty. Saudi girls are not allowed to play sports in schools, which, by Saudi health official admission, is causing health problems and staggering expenses.

All marriages are arranged by male relatives. If a Saudi woman divorces her husband, she loses custody of her children over age six. Women have little or no freedom to prosecute sexual abuse cases, being required to produce four witnesses. In court, a woman's testimony is equivalent to half that of a man's. These conditions violate women's human rights and have devastating personal and social effects.

These policies have contributed to disparities that affect Saudi society and women in Saudi Arabia and beyond. Critics argue that such policies reflect the perspectives of more extremist-leaning segments of Saudi society. CDHR supports efforts to increase opportunities for Saudi women to participate as equal partners in the country's social, political, and civic development. As activists, elected officials, and constituents, women can play an important role in shaping a society that values inclusion, civic engagement, and social progress. Supporters of women's empowerment in Saudi Arabia view greater participation and equality as important factors in promoting development, tolerance, and democratic reform within the country.

The alliance between the Saudi ruling dynasty and its extremist religious allies is at the heart of Saudi exclusion and mistreatment of women. The royal family has traditionally used a conservative brand of Sunni Islam (Wahhabism) to justify its rule. Present-day Saudi Arabia was founded by an alliance between Muhammad ibn Saud, great grandfather of the current ruling dynasty, and Muhammad Abd al-Wahhab, the founder and father of Wahhabism in the middle of the eighteenth century.

Wahhabi religious police have free rein to enforce their interpretation of religious law, and Saudi women face severe restrictions in the political, economic, and social spheres. Women cannot directly write freely, or assemble and organize against restrictions. The system has stifled the development of the country and kept its citizens divided.

Increased participation by Saudi women will tilt the balance in favor of tolerant policies that are in the best interest of all Saudi citizens and the international community. With Saudi Arabia's religious and economic influence regionally and globally, empowering women in Saudi Arabia will increase chances for democratic reforms in other Arab and Muslim societies worldwide.

== Economic reform ==
The problem of discrimination against Saudi Arabia's religious minorities is compounded by the Saudi regime's restrictive and inhumane policies towards the country's nearly nine million foreigners, or one-third of the population of Saudi Arabia, who live and work in the country without any rights or recognition under the law. The vast majority of these expatriates have fled their own poverty-stricken or war-torn countries in Africa and Asia, such as Bangladesh, India, Pakistan, Sudan, Sri Lanka and the Philippines. The 2004 report by the Saudi Statistics Department of the Ministry of Economy and Planning acknowledges that non-Saudis account for 67% of the Kingdom's labor force, while it is estimated expatriates hold 85–90% of the private sector jobs. There is no minimum wage and workers do not have the right to organize or strike.

In 2004, Human Rights Watch reported that they had encountered both women and men working in conditions resembling slavery. Female workers coming to Saudi Arabia to work as domestic servants often endure the most severe conditions. Upon arrival, they may find that the contracts they signed in their home countries are disregarded and they are forced to work 18 hours a day, 7 days a week and are paid far less than agreed in the contract, if they receive pay at all. They are forced to sleep on the floor, are underfed, and are forbidden to leave their employment facilities or compounds. They are kept in complete social isolation without outside social contacts or freedom of movement. They are subjected to frequent beatings and often face the trauma of sexual abuse by the male members of the household.

It is virtually impossible for foreign workers to improve their situations, as they are deprived of legal recourse when their passports are confiscated by their employers upon entry to Saudi Arabia. Expatriates who complain or attempt to seek legal redress can be arrested and held indefinitely without charge, legal counsel, and access to their embassies. Consequently, foreigners are executed in much larger numbers than Saudi citizens. For instance, in 2003, fifty individuals were executed by the Saudi authorities; only 19 of them were Saudis.

== Minority rights ==
Religious minorities in Saudi Arabia (non-Wahhabi Muslims and non-Muslims) face discrimination in employment and education, and are forbidden from openly practicing their religion. In cases involving the calculation of accidental injury or death compensation, a non-Muslim receives only half of the compensation that a male Muslim would receive, and in some cases only one-sixteenth of that amount, depending on intentionality. The testimony of non-Wahhabi Muslims can be disregarded, and non-Muslims are likely to receive harsher criminal sentences than Muslims. All verdicts are decided by the whim of partial Wahhabi judges.

The 2004 statistical report from the Saudi Ministry of Economy and Planning acknowledged that non-Saudis account for 67% of the Kingdom's labor force. Other estimates set this figure as high as 85 to 90%. This translates to nearly seven million foreigners, or one-third of the population of Saudi Arabia, who live and work in the country without any rights or recognition under the strict Saudi-Wahhabi religious laws and practices. Without these workers, many of whom are non-Muslims, the Saudi economy would collapse. This hiring practice permeates the government and private employment sectors. Saudis are bypassed in favor of cheap labor, mostly from poorer Asian or African countries, who accept any terms without complaint due to their fear of arrest or deportation.

Despite Saudi Arabia's dependence on its labor and expertise, foreign workers in the country are treated very poorly. Upon entry into the country, the passports of non-diplomats are confiscated by their employers or sponsors and the foreigner becomes a virtual hostage of his or her sponsor until departing the country. Foreign workers often face abusive conditions in the workplace, being denied breaks and meals while working unreasonably long hours, and in some cases not receiving pay for months or years at a time.

There are reports of verbal and physical abuse, especially of foreign women working as domestic servants in Saudi households. There is no minimum wage, and workers do not have the right to organize or strike. There is no agency that recognizes the grievances of foreign laborers, and they may not access the justice system. Embassies of foreign workers often side with the Saudis for fear of losing Saudi loans, favorable trade deals, and access to cheap oil.

CDHR strongly urges the international community to condemn these abuses and the institutional discrimination against anyone in Saudi Arabia because of belief, ethnicity, race, or gender. The recognition and protection of basic human rights constitutes a part of the democratization process. A policy of fairness and decency must replace the government-sanctioned practice of discrimination and abuse in Saudi Arabia.
