= Sultan bin Abdullah Al Saud =

Saudi royal (born 1995)

- Born: 5 January 1995 (age 31); Riyadh, Saudi Arabia
Names
- Sultan bin Abdullah bin Abdulaziz bin Abdul Rahman Al Saud
- House: House of Saud
- Father: Abdullah of Saudi Arabia
- Education: King Saud University

Sultan bin Abdullah bin Abdulaziz Al Saud (born 5 January 1995) is a son of King Abdullah and one of the grandsons of Saudi Arabia's founder King Abdulaziz.

== Early life and activities ==
Sultan bin Abdullah was born on 5 January 1995 in Riyadh. His blood siblings are Sahab bint Abdullah and Saad bin Abdullah. Sultan's father ascended to the throne on 1 August 2005 upon the death of his half-brother, King Fahd.

Prince Sultan has spoken highly of his childhood, believing it was the best times he ever lived. However, he says he wishes he "soaked it up more."

Sultan graduated from Kingdom School in Riyadh, and particularly followed his early studies in sciences. He studied law at King Saud University.

Sultan has business activities. He is also an advisor for the Saudi government, a board member of the King Abdullah Foundation, and is CEO of Alfa Imtiyaz Holding Company, where he directs day to day company operations.

Sultan has traveled extensively, and his father was the main teacher in his life. Over the course of his career, he has experienced multiple important political events, the most prominent being the peaceful transition of the authority in the Saudi Kingdom after his father died.
