= Saud bin Hamoud Al Rashid =

Emir of Jabal Shammar (r. 1908)

Emir of Jabal Shammar
- Reign: January 1908 – 13 September 1908
- Predecessor: Sultan bin Hamoud
- Successor: Saud bin Abdulaziz
- Born: 1875; Ha'il
- Died: September 1908 (aged 32–33); Ha'il
Names
- Saud bin Hamoud bin Obaid bin Ali Al Rashid
- House: House of Rashid
- Father: Hamoud bin Obaid Al Rashid

Saud bin Hamoud Al Rashid (Arabic: سلطان بن حمود الرشيد, romanized: Suʿūd bin Ḥammūd Āl Rašīd; 1870–September 1908) was the ninth Emir of Jabal Shammar from January to September 1908.

== Early life ==
Saud was born around 1875, the fifth son of Hamoud bin Obaid Al Rashid.

== Career ==
In late December 1906, Saud bin Hamoud and his two brothers Sultan and Faisal invited the Emir, his brothers and his cousins on a hunting trip. There, Mutaib was killed by Sultan, Talal bin Nayef Al Rashid (the father of Muhammad, the twelfth Emir and Abdullah) was killed by Saud, and Mutaib's brother Mishaal was killed by Faisal. Sultan then asked who the people of Ha'il supported to become Emir, who answered that they supported Muhammad, the remaining full brother of Mutaib. Muhammad was then killed in Ha'il. The only son of Abdulaziz who was not killed in the bloodshed and its aftermath was Saud, half-brother of the murdered Emir, who was taken to Medina by his Al Sabhan relatives. Sultan bin Hamoud Al Rashid then became Emir.

Sultan's reign was seen as a disaster. He renewed conflict with Ibn Saud after peace was made by Emir Mutaib, allying himself with the new Emir of Buraydah, Muhammad bin Abdullah Al Khayl. The Mutayr tribe was shortly added to the coalition and they launched an attack on the Saudis in the Battle of Tarafiyah which was repelled within weeks. Additionally, the Hajj caravans stopped using the Jabal route during his reign, which was an important source of revenue for the Emirate. Sultan recognized his unpopularity and attempted to flee into Syria, taking a chunk of wealth from the treasury with him. Saud bin Hamoud, his brother and chief minister, caught up to him hiding in a cave in the Jabal Aja. Sultan was dragged back to Ha'il by Saud and killed.

Saud bin Hamoud ascended to the throne and renewed peace with Ibn Saud, attempting to undo many of his brother's mistakes. However, he was met by opposition from Sultan bin Hamoud's bodyguard, bringing more chaos in a rebellion that although eventually quelled, caused damage to many settled areas. Saud could not find much support from either the Bedouin or the Hadir. In the summer of 1908, Al Sabhan made a move to dethrone him and install the exiled Saud bin Abdulaziz Al Rashid. They first attacked Rashidi tax collectors near Hejaz, then used the funds they extracted to create an army. Men of the men of the Hutaym tribe were enlisted and they marched on Ha'il, defeating Saud bin Hamoud's force outside the city. The people of Ha'il opened the gates to the insurgents, while Saud bin Hamoud locked himself inside the Barzan Palace. It was placed under siege and six hours later Saud bin Hamoud surrendered. Saud bin Abdulaziz was enthroned on 13 September 1908.

In the early days of the new government, Saud bin Hamoud was strangled in a dungeon.
