= Hessa bint Trad Al Shalaan =

Saudi woman who is one of King Abdullah's wives

- Spouse: King Abdullah
- Issue: List: Prince Faisal Princess Abeer Prince Mansour Princess Haifa Princess Reema Princess Seeta Princess Sara Princess Naifah
- House: Al Saud (by marriage)

Hessa bint Trad Al Shalaan (Arabic: حصة بنت طراد الشعلان) is a Saudi royal and the wife of King Abdullah who was the ruler of Saudi Arabia between 2005 and 2015. There are many reports stating that she was his favorite spouse.

Princess Hessa is from the Ruwallah tribe and her father, Trad, was a nephew of Nuri Al Shalaan, emir of the tribe. She is the founder and president of the National Home Health Care Foundation. She established the foundation in Riyadh in 1997 to provide care for the patients with terminal illnesses upon their discharge from public hospitals.

Princess Hessa has eight children with King Abdullah, including Prince Faisal and Princess Abeer. The others include Prince Mansour, Princess Haifa who is the wife of Saud bin Mishaal bin Abdulaziz, Princess Reema, Princess Seeta, Princess Sara who is the wife of Fahd bin Badr bin Abdulaziz and Princess Naifah. As of 2020 Prince Mansour was the chairman of the Knowledge Economic City Company which runs the King Abdullah Economic City.
