= Turki bin Talal Al Saud =

Saudi royal, politician, and former military officer

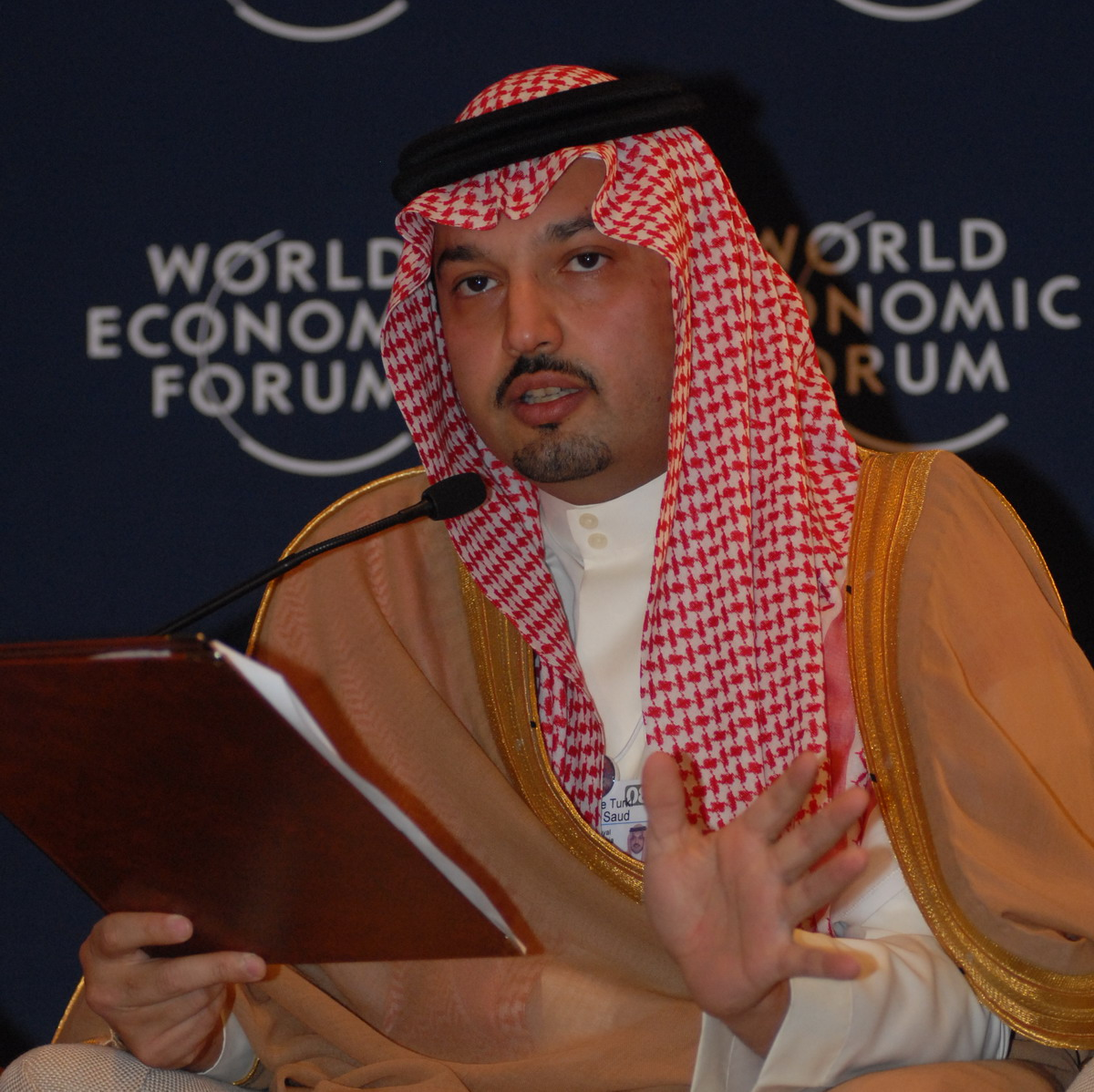
- Turki bin Talal bin Abdulaziz Al Saud at the World Economic Forum

Governor of 'Asir Region
- In office: 27 December 2018 – present
- Predecessor: Faisal bin Khalid
- Monarch: King Salman
- Born: Riyadh, Saudi Arabia
- Issue: Abdulaziz; Al Anood; Alia; Abeer; Al Johara
Names
- Turki bin Talal bin Abdulaziz bin Abdul Rahman bin Faisal Al Saud
- House: Al Saud
- Father: Talal bin Abdulaziz Al Saud
- Mother: Moudie bint Abdul Mohsen Al Angari

Turki bin Talal Al Saud (Arabic: تركي بن طلال بن عبد العزيز آل سعود) is a Saudi prince, grandson of Saudi's founder King Abdulaziz, politician, military officer and, since 2018, the governor of Asir.

== Early life and education ==
Prince Turki is Prince Talal's fourth son. His blood sister is Sara bint Talal. Their mother is Moudie bint Abdul Mohsen Al Angari who was the third wife of Prince Talal. She died in 2008.

Prince Turki has a BSc in political science. He was educated at Royal Military Academy Sandhurst in the UK and the United States Air Force Academy. He received an honorary doctorate degree in management from Amman Arab University in 2015.

== Career ==
Prince Turki served in the Royal Saudi Air Force as a pilot, eventually reaching the rank of brigadier general. He also served as personal representative of his father, Prince Talal bin AbdulAziz Al Saud, and as chairman of the Board of Trustees at Mentor Arabia.

== Family ==
Prince Turki's former wife is his cousin, Sara bint Abdullah, a daughter of King Abdullah, who was Turki's uncle. They have one son, Prince Abdulaziz bin Turki bin Talal Al Saud. Prince Turki also has four daughters: Princess Al Anood, Princess Alia, Princess Abeer and Princess Al Jawhara.
