= Abeer bint Abdullah Al Saud =

Saudi royal

- Spouse: Fahd bin Turki Al Saud
- Abeer bint Abdullah bin Abdulaziz bin Abdul Rahman Al Saud
- House: Al Saud
- Father: King Abdullah
- Mother: Hessa bint Trad Al Shaalan

Abeer bint Abdullah Al Saud is a member of the Saudi royal family. She is the chairperson of the Asayel Cooperative Society. She is a daughter of King Abdullah and one of the grandchildren of Saudi's founder King Abdulaziz. She has been in exile in Scotland since 2020.

== Early life and activities ==
Abeer bint Abdullah is the eighth daughter of King Abdullah. Her mother is Hessa bint Trad Al Shaalan. Abeer is the full sister of Faisal bin Abdullah who was former president of the Saudi Arabian Red Crescent and dismissed from the office in the mid-2016 without any official announcement.

Abeer is the president of the Asayel Cooperative Society which assists families in their production-related activities and the international ambassador for social responsibility. Some of her positions include honorary president of the Arab Traffic Safety Organization, chair of the board of governors for the Arab Women Charter, and honorary member of the Initiative for Sustainable Human Development and the Arab Women Charter. She is also the founder of the Al Obayya project. In 2019, she initiated a community partnership award bearing her name.

== Personal life ==
Abeer bint Abdullah married Fahd bin Turki who served as the commander of the Saudi-led coalition joint forces operating in Yemen between February 2018 and late August 2020. They have four children, one son and three daughters. Their son, Abdulaziz bin Fahd, was named deputy governor of Al Jouf province in 2017. His tenure ended on 31 August 2020 when his father was also dismissed. One of their daughters, Noura, married Mish'aal bin Sultan Al Saud, son of Prince Sultan, in 2013.

Just before the arrest of her husband and her son in August 2020, Abeer bint Abdullah went into exile in Scotland.
