= Ali Alyami =

Saudi human rights activist

Ali Alyami is the executive director and founder of the Center for Democracy and Human Rights in Saudi Arabia, based in Washington, DC.

== Biography ==
Ali Alyami was born and raised in Saudi Arabia. In 1967, he emigrated to the United States on an Aramco scholarship. He received an M.A. from California State University, Los Angeles, and a PhD from the Claremont Graduate University.

He has worked for the Arab Organization for Human Rights in Cairo, Egypt, the Saudi Institute in Washington, DC, and the American Friends Service Committee in San Francisco. In 2004, he founded the Center for Democracy and Human Rights in Saudi Arabia. Dr. Alyami has also delivered expert testimony, before the US Congressional Human Rights Conference, about human rights in his home country Saudi Arabia.

== See also ==
Ali Alyami, "Saudi Arabia at a Crossroads", Free Muslim Coalition Against Terrorism, June 20, 2012
Ali Alyami, "Saudi Arabia at a Crossroads", essay posted as comment at Saudi Jeans, June 26, 2012
