= Fahd bin Turki Al Saud =

Saudi royal and general (born 1959)

- Born: August 1959 (age 67)
- Allegiance: Saudi Arabia
- Branch: Royal Saudi Land Forces
- Service years: 1983–2020
- Rank: Lieutenant general
- Commands: RSLF; Joint forces in Yemen
- Conflicts: Saudi Arabian-led intervention in Yemen
- Education: U.S. Army Field Artillery School; U.S. International University
- Spouse: Abeer bint Abdullah Al Saud

Lieutenant General Fahd bin Turki Al Saud (born August 1959) is a Saudi Arabian prince, a grandson of Saudi's founder King Abdulaziz, and a military officer who served as the commander of the Saudi-led coalition joint forces operating in Yemen. He was relieved from his position and forced into retirement upon a royal decree issued on 31 August 2020. In June 2021, he was said to have been sentenced to death over an alleged coup attempt.

== Early life and education ==
Prince Fahd was born in August 1959. He is the son of Prince Turki II bin Abdulaziz Al Saud and Noura bint Abdullah bin Abdul Rahman, a daughter of his grandfather Ibn Saud's half-brother, Abdullah. Prince Fahd's full-brothers are Prince Khalid (born December 1957), Prince Faisal (born January 1965) and Prince Sultan (born May 1968).

Prince Fahd completed the U.S. Army Field Artillery School in 1984. He also has a master's degree in international business administration from the U.S. International University.

== Career ==
Prince Fahd joined the Saudi military in 1983. He first led paratroops and then special forces. Later he became deputy commander of ground forces and led the joint special operations, including Decisive Storm and Restoring Hope. Until the death of Prince Sultan bin Abdulaziz, who was the defense minister, Prince Fahd allied with him.

Prince Fahd was appointed the commander of the Saudi-led coalition joint forces in February 2018. He was the commander of the Royal Saudi Land Forces from April 2017.

On 31 August 2020, Prince Fahd was replaced by Mutlaq bin Salim Al Azaima in the post of Joint Coalition Forces Commander in Yemen. Prince Fahd was forcibly retired following his removal. The reason for Prince Fahd's dismissal was corruption allegations in regard to the transactions at the ministry of defense.

In June 2021, he was said to have been sentenced to death by a military court over an alleged coup attempt to remove King Salman and his son Crown Prince Mohammed bin Salman. King Salman and Mohammed bin Salman are Fahd's uncle and cousin, respectively.

== Personal life ==
The wife of Fahd bin Turki is Abeer bint Abdullah, a daughter of King Abdullah. Fahd bin Turki and Abeer bint Abdullah have four children, one son and three daughters. Their son, Abdulaziz, was named deputy governor of Al Jouf province in 2017. His tenure also ended on 31 August 2020 when his father was dismissed. One of their daughters married Mishaal bin Sultan Al Saud, son of Prince Sultan, in 2013.

Fahd bought a home on La Jolla's Whale Watch Way in San Diego, California, in the late 1970s.

Military offices
Preceded by Office established	Joint Coalition Forces Commander in Yemen; 2018–31 August 2020	Succeeded by Lt. Gen. Mutlaq bin Salim Al Azaima
Preceded by ?	Commander of the Royal Saudi Land Forces; 2017—2018	Succeeded by Lt. Gen. Fahd bin Abdullah bin Muhammad al Mutair
