= Faisal bin Abdullah Al Saud (born 1950) =

Saudi royal, businessman, and former official

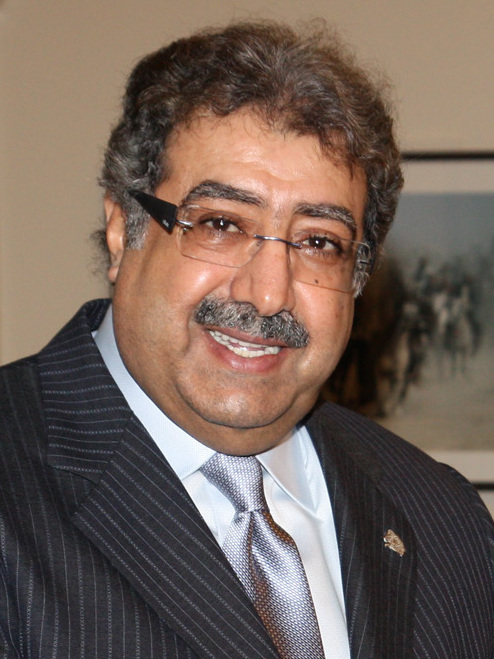
- Prince Faisal bin Abdullah in 2011

Minister of Education
- In office: 14 February 2009 – 22 December 2013
- Predecessor: Abdullah bin Saleh bin Obaid
- Successor: Khalid bin Faisal Al Saud
- Prime Minister: King Abdullah
- Born: 13 May 1950 (age 76); Riyadh
- Spouse: Adila bint Abdullah Al Saud
- Issue: 6
Names
- Faisal bin Abdullah bin Mohammed bin Abdulaziz bin Saud bin Faisal bin Turki Al Saud
- House: Al Saud
- Father: Abdullah bin Mohammed Al Saud
- Mother: Nouf bint Abdulaziz Al Saud
- Education: Menlo College; Stanford University

Faisal bin Abdullah Al Saud (Arabic: فيصل بن عبدالله آل سعود, romanized: Fayṣal bin ʿAbdullāh Āl Saʿūd; born 13 May 1950) is a retired Saudi Arabian politician and businessman who served as the Saudi Arabian minister of education from 2009 to 2013 in the administration of King Abdullah, his maternal uncle and father-in-law. He is a member of the House of Saud.

== Early life and education ==
Faisal bin Abdullah was born in Riyadh on 13 May 1950. He is one of the descendants of Saud bin Faisal. His mother is Nouf bint Abdulaziz Al Saud, a daughter of King Abdulaziz and the full sister of King Abdullah.

Prince Faisal was educated in the United States, receiving a bachelor's degree in business administration from Menlo College in 1971 and a master's degree in industrial engineering from Stanford University in 1977. His master's degree studies included the fields of values, technologies and society, and futurology.

== Career ==
Faisal bin Abdullah worked in the research and industrial development center at the ministry of commerce from 1971 to 1973. During the period 1992 to 1997, he founded companies and became stakeholder in some firms. Faisal bin Abdullah was deputy commander of the National Guard’s western sector from 1992 to 2003. In the years before his 2009 appointment as minister of education, he was deputy chief of General Intelligence Presidency (GIP), a position he had held since 2003. Prince Faisal was responsible for the reorganization of GIP's administrative structure.

In addition to these official posts, Faisal bin Abdullah played a role in improving the King Abdullah University of Science and Technology. He was also the chairman of steering committee of Al Aghar Group of Strategic Thought.

Faisal bin Abdullah was appointed minister of education to the Saudi cabinet on 14 February 2009, replacing Abdullah bin Saleh bin Obaid who had been in this post since 2005. At the time of the appointment, western news media reported that Faisal had earlier been involved in efforts to reduce extremist influences from the Saudi education system; his appointment was thought to reflect the King's intention to reinforce efforts to reduce the influence of extremists in the domain of education. However, his appointment as well as the others made in 2009 was regarded as a struggle for power rather than a dynamic of reform.

On 22 December 2013, Prince Faisal was removed from office upon his request and replaced by Khalid bin Faisal Al Saud in the post.

=== Views ===
It was thought that Faisal bin Abdullah supported the reform initiatives of King Abdullah. Furthermore, he was regarded as progressive. Faisal bin Abdullah described King Abdullah as "the closest route between two points - a straight line." He further argued that the king perceived the things as straightforward.

Faisal bin Abdullah stated in 2010 that curricula should be reorganized and improved to include more focus on progressive development and investment in human beings and to depend on Saudi Arabia's religious, historical and cultural characteristics. He said in May 2010, speaking on Saudi Television's "Good Morning" program, that women would be employed to teach boys at the public primary school level, although there are no mixed classrooms in Saudi Arabia. He further argued that it might be time for children to attend mixed-sex primary schools. Concerning the unavailability of physical education courses in public schools for female students in Saudi Arabia, he stated in August 2011 that the ministry was still reviewing the issue.

=== Membership ===
Faisal bin Abdullah was the chairman of the National Committee for Education, Culture and Sciences. He had a keen interest in heritage with a passion for archaeology. He supported the Saudi Commission for Tourism and Antiquities (SCTA) which was then headed by Sultan bin Salman. For him, SCTA was very crucial to preserve Saudi Arabia's heritage. Faisal bin Abdullah was in favor of more parallel efforts by related authorities to assist the SCTA to achieve its mission.

He was also member of the following organizations: Vice president of King Abdulaziz and his companions foundation for giftedness and creativity; president of the Saudi Arabian Boy Scouts Association, (at the age of 14 in 1963 he attended the 11th World Scout Jamboree in Marathon, Greece); president of the Saudi national commission for childhood, and chairman of the board of trustees of the equestrian fund. He founded a think tank, dealing with the reform of higher education.

== Personal life ==
Faisal bin Abdullah is married to his first cousin Adila bint Abdullah, daughter of his maternal uncle King Abdullah. Princess Adila was one of only a few female members of the royal family to have a semi-public role. It was considered that Princess Adila gave very significant backing for her husband's political initiatives. They have six children, two sons and four daughters. One of their daughters is a graduate of King's College in London.

As of 2010 Faisal bin Abdullah was living in Jeddah where he had moved in 1992 when he was appointed to the National Guard in the Western Province. He is a professional photographer. He took photographs of King Abdullah's daily life when the latter was crown prince, and published them in a book. Faisal bin Abdullah received an honorary doctorate degree from the Georgetown College in 2010.
