= List of royalty by net worth =

This is a list of richest monarchs and family members, as estimated by Business Insider in 2018. The evaluations are based on their personal net worths, excluding properties held by the State, Government or Crown, and all of the figures are in U.S. dollars.

Rank	Name	Title	Residence	Net worth	Source of wealth
1	Vajiralongkorn	King of Thailand	Thailand	$30 billion	Investments derived from the Crown Property Bureau.
2	Hassanal Bolkiah	Sultan of Brunei	Brunei	$20 billion	Profits from oil and gas industry.
3	Salman	King of Saudi Arabia	Saudi Arabia	$18 billion	Profits from oil industry.
4	Mohammed bin Rashid Al Maktoum	Ruler of Dubai	United Arab Emirates	$4 billion	Majority share of Dubai Holding and investments from the Abu Dhabi Investment Authority.
5	Henri	Grand Duke of Luxembourg (abdicated in 2025)	Luxembourg	$4 billion	
6	Hans-Adam II	Prince of Liechtenstein	Liechtenstein	$3.5 billion	Holdings in the Prince of Liechtenstein Foundation.
7	Mohammed VI	King of Morocco	Morocco	$2.1 billion	Investments in SNI and Siger Holdings.
8	Juan Carlos I	King of Spain (abdicated in 2014)	Spain	$2 billion — $2.3 billion	Oil, enterprise and real estate. Current controversy over the money hidden in offshore banks and the $100 million received from Saudi Arabia.
9	Tamim bin Hamad Al Thani	Emir of Qatar	Qatar	$1.2 billion	From various enterprises.
10	Albert II	Prince of Monaco	Monaco	$1.0 billion	Various enterprises, including Société des bains de mer de Monaco and casinos.
11	Charles III	King of the United Kingdom and other Commonwealth realms	United Kingdom	$747 million	From property, jewelry and other assets. See Finances of the British royal family.
12	Beatrix	Queen of the Netherlands (abdicated in 2013)	Netherlands	$200 million	Real estate, investments, and a stake in Shell.

== See also ==
- List of wealthiest families
