= Seeta bint Abdulaziz Al Saud =

Saudi royal and a daughter of King Abdulaziz (1930–2011)

- Born: 1930; Riyadh, Kingdom of Hejaz and Nejd
- Died: 13 April 2011 (aged 80–81); Riyadh, Saudi Arabia
- Burial: 14 April 2011; Riyadh
- Spouse: Abdullah bin Mohammed bin Saud Al Kabir Al Saud
- Issue: Noura bint Abdullah; Nouf bint Abdullah Fahd bin Abdullah; Turki bin Abdullah; Bandar bin Abdullah
Names
- Seeta bint Abdulaziz bin Abdul Rahman bin Faisal
- House: Al Saud
- Father: King Abdulaziz
- Mother: Fahda bint Asi bin Shuraim Al Shammari

Seeta bint Abdulaziz Al Saud (Arabic: صيتة بنت عبد العزيز آل سعود Ṣeeyta bint 'Abd al 'Azīz Āl Sa'ūd; 1930 – 13 April 2011) was a daughter of King Abdulaziz of Saudi Arabia and the younger full-sister of King Abdullah.

== Early life ==
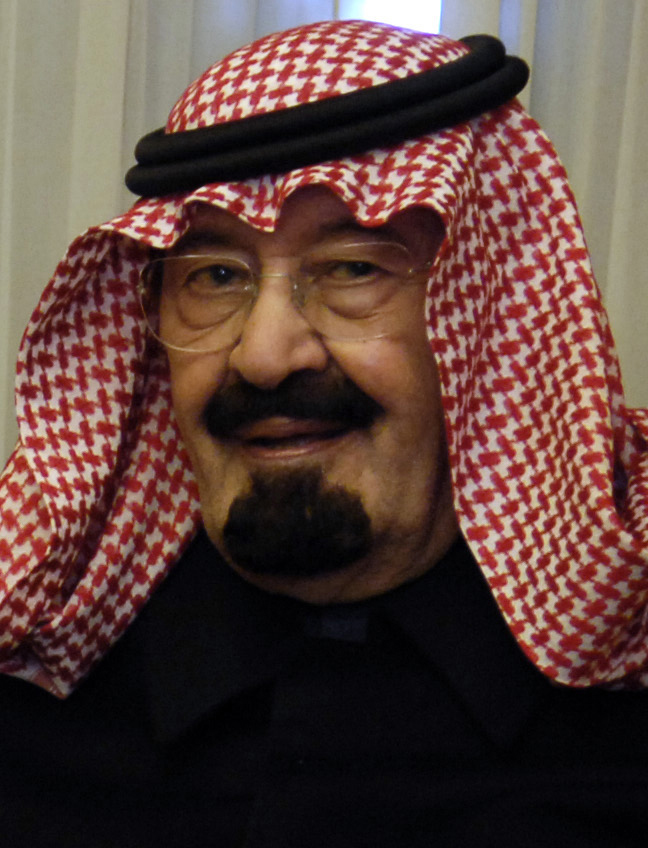
King Abdullah, Seeta's brother

Princess Seeta was born in 1930. She was the daughter of King Abdulaziz and Fahda bint Asi bin Shuraim Al Shammari who was one of two Rashidi women Abdulaziz married. She was the younger full sister of King Abdullah with whom she was very close. She had also a full sister, Nouf bint Abdulaziz, who died in August 2015.

== Activities ==
Seeta was active in charitable efforts and forming women groups such as the Princesses' Council. Furthermore, the first and second Saudi Women's Forum was carried out under her patronage in 2009 and 2010, respectively. In May 2011, a conference entitled “Saudi Women of Tomorrow” was also organized under her patronage. She sponsored many charities and made donations to various research programs and family welfare projects. Under her patronage, career days were organized towards female employment.

=== Princesses' council ===
In 2003, Princess Seeta initiated the Princesses’ Council. The council was designed to involve one member of each of the royal family's sub-branches. It was the first family council for female royals in Saudi Arabia. All members of the council were asked to be interested in social work such as health-care, children, women, and business. The council became an important body in the House of Saud. Instead of focusing on charity work, it functions as a think tank and lobbying body.

The council was designed to meet at a regular period, twice a month, every second week lasting for two or three hours. Societal issues focusing on women-related topics were discussed in the meetings. The outcomes of these meetings were mostly non-binding suggestions for solving certain issues, and petitions to relevant governmental institutions. At the initial phase, the number of the council members was twenty-two. As of 2011 the number of council members was thirty royal women.

== Personal life ==
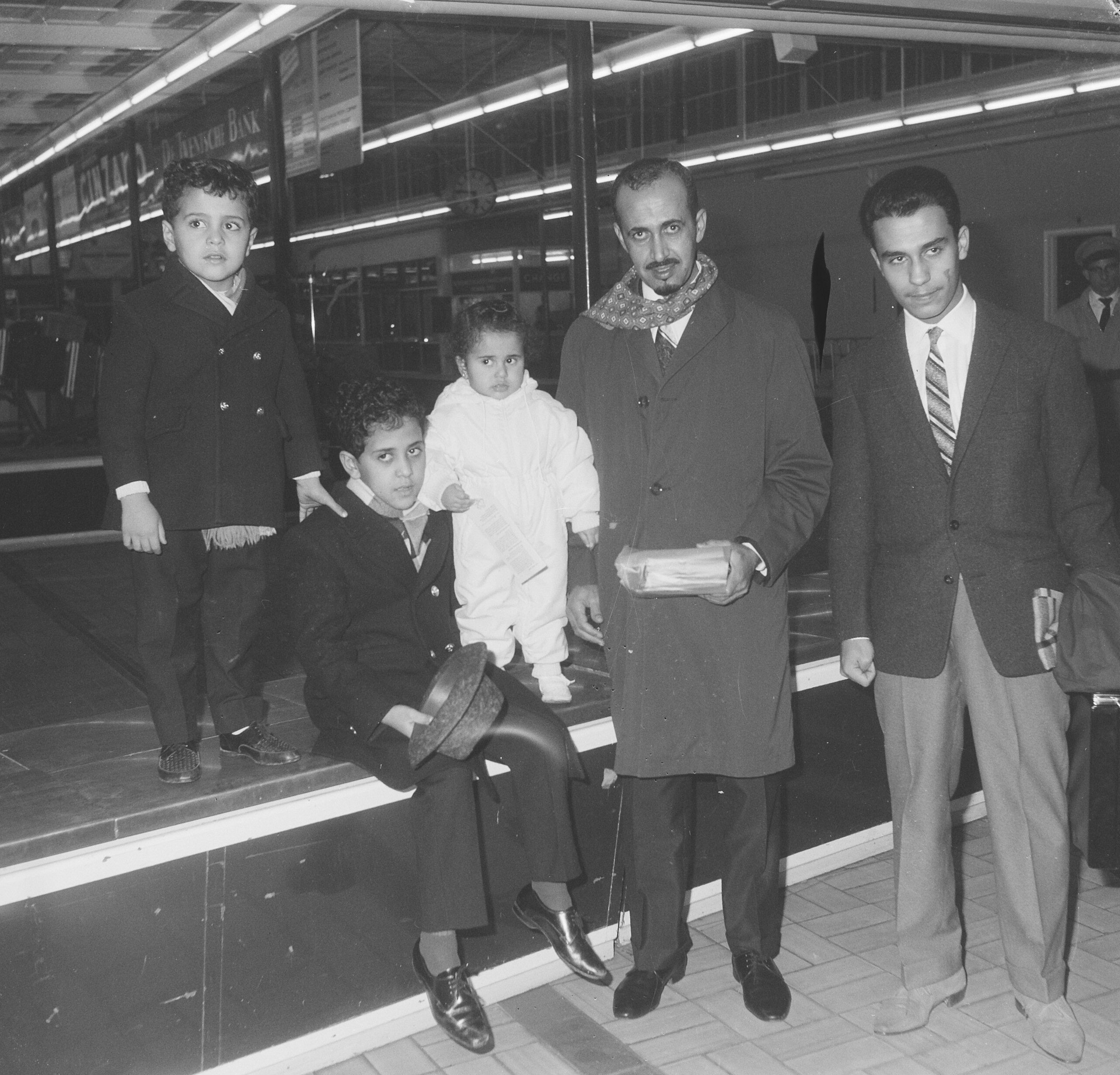
Abdullah bin Muhammad bin Saud and his children Turki, Bandar, Noura and Fahd (1961)

Seeta bint Abdulaziz married her first cousin once removed Abdullah bin Muhammad bin Saud Al Kabir. He was the eldest son of Mohammed bin Saud Al Kabir and grandson of Seeta's aunt Noura bint Abdul Rahman and Saud Al Kabir. Abdullah bin Muhammad was one of the members of Al Saud Family Council which was established in June 2000 by then Crown Prince Abdullah to discuss private issues, including business activities of princes and marriages of princesses to nonroyals. He died in January 1994 at the age of 68.

Seeta bint Abdulaziz and Abdullah bin Muhammad had five children, three sons, Turki, Fahd and Bandar, and two daughters, Noura and Nouf. Their son Turki was one of the advisors to King Abdullah and is a former military officer in the National Guard during the 1980s. Another son, Fahd, is the former assistant minister of defense. Princess Seeta's sons are considered to be significant members of the Al Kabir branch of Al Sauds. Her daughter, Noura bint Abdullah (born 1958), is married to Khalid bin Abdullah, the eldest son of King Abdullah. Another daughter, Nouf, was born in 1963.

== Death ==
Seeta bint Abdulaziz died on 13 April 2011 after a long illness. Her funeral prayer was held at the Imam Turki bin Abdullah Mosque in Riyadh on 14 April 2011. The funeral prayer was attended by King Abdullah, Crown Prince Sultan, Prince Nayef, Prince Salman, Prince Bandar, Prince Turki, Saad Hariri and other senior princes. President Barack Obama called King Abdullah to convey his condolences.
