= Mishaal bin Saud Al Rashid =

Eldest son of Rashidi Emir Saud bin Abdulaziz Al Rashid (1913–1931)

- Born: 1913
- Died: 1931 (aged 17–18)
- House: House of Rashid
- Father: Saud bin Abdulaziz Al Rashid
- Mother: Fahda bint Asi bin Shuraim Al Shammari

Mishaal bin Saud bin Abdulaziz Al Rashid (1913 – 1931) was the eldest son of Fahda bint Asi bin Shuraim Al Shammari and Rashidi Emir Saud bin Abdulaziz Al Rashid. Mishaal was assassinated in 1931. Mishaal's half-brother from his mother was King Abdullah of Saudi Arabia. His step-father was King Abdulaziz, the first ruler of modern Saudi Arabia.
