= Abdulaziz bin Saud Al Rashid =

Son of Rashidi Emir Saud bin Abdulaziz Al Rashid

- Born: 1915
- Died: c.1960s
Names
- Abdulaziz bin Saud bin Abdulaziz
- House: House of Rashid
- Father: Saud bin Abdulaziz Al Rashid
- Mother: Lulwa Al-Salih Al-Sabhan

Abdulaziz bin Saud Al Rashid (born 1915) was the son of Lulwa Al-Salih Al-Sabhan and Rashidi Emir Saud bin Abdulaziz Al Rashid. He is notable for being the father of poet Talal Al-Rasheed.
