= Saud bin Abdulaziz Al Rashid =

Monarch in the Arabian Peninsula

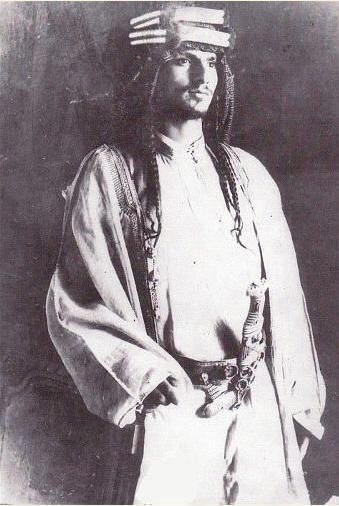
- Photograph c. 1910s

Emir of Jabal Shammar
- Reign: 1908–1920
- Predecessor: Saud bin Hamoud
- Successor: Abdullah bin Mutaib
- Regent: Hamoud bin Sabhan Al Sabhan; Zamil bin Salem Al Sabhan; Saud bin Saleh Al Sabhan; Aqab bin Jaza Al Ajil
- Born: 1898; Ha'il
- Died: March 29, 1920 (aged 21–22)
- Spouse: Fahda bint Asi bin Shuraim Al Shammari
- Issue: Mishaal bin Saud Al Rashid; Abdulaziz bin Saud Al Rashid; Muhammad bin Saud Al Rashid; Saud bin Saud Al Rashid
- House: House of Rashid
- Father: Abdulaziz bin Mutaib
- Mother: Moudi bint Sabhan Al Sabhan

Saud bin Abdulaziz Al Rashid (Arabic: سعود بن عبد العزيز الرشيد Suʿūd ibn ʿAbdulʿazīz Āl Rašid; 1898–1920) was the tenth Emir of Jabal Shammar between 1908 and 1920.

== Early life ==
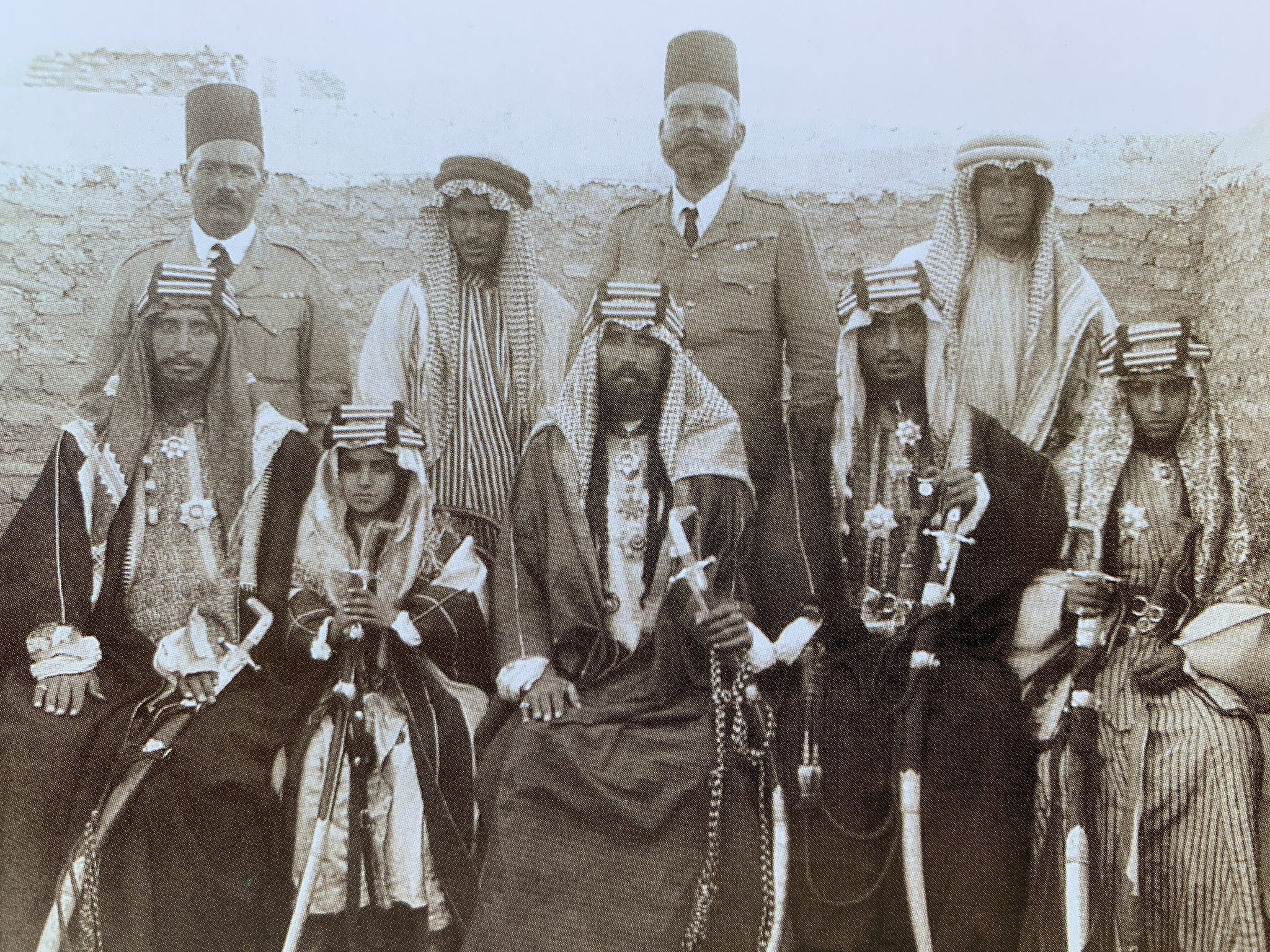
Saud (seated, second from left) in 1908 during his stay in Medina. Notable personages in this picture include Zamil bin Salem Al Sabhan (seated, first from left), Hammoud bin Sabhan Al Sabhan (seated, middle), and Saud bin Saleh Al Sabhan (seated, far right)

Saud was born around 1898. He was born to Abdulaziz bin Mutaib Al Rashid, the reigning Rashidi emir at the time, and Moudi bint Sabhan Al Sabhan, who had previously been married to Muhammad bin Abdullah Al Rashid. On April 12, 1906, his father was killed in the Battle of Rawdat Muhanna, with Saud's older half-brother, Mutaib, succeeding him as emir. Mutaib's maternal uncles Saud, Faisal, and Sultan bin Hamoud Al Rashid vied for power however, and on December 31, 1906, he and his two full brothers Mishaal and Muhammad were killed by them. Saud was saved and taken to Medina by his uncle Hamoud bin Sabhan Al Sabhan. Sultan bin Hamoud Al Rashid then became emir, though he was vastly unpopular, and he and his brothers agreed that he should go to Tayma and Saud bin Hamoud Al Rashid become emir. When he left, however, Saud was informed that he had taken all the treasure and thus he summoned the townspeople, and caught up with him at Mogug, killing him. In September 1908, Hamoud bin Sabhan Al Sabhan returned from Medina and killed Saud bin Hamoud, proclaiming ten-year-old Saud bin Abdulaziz as emir.

== Reign ==
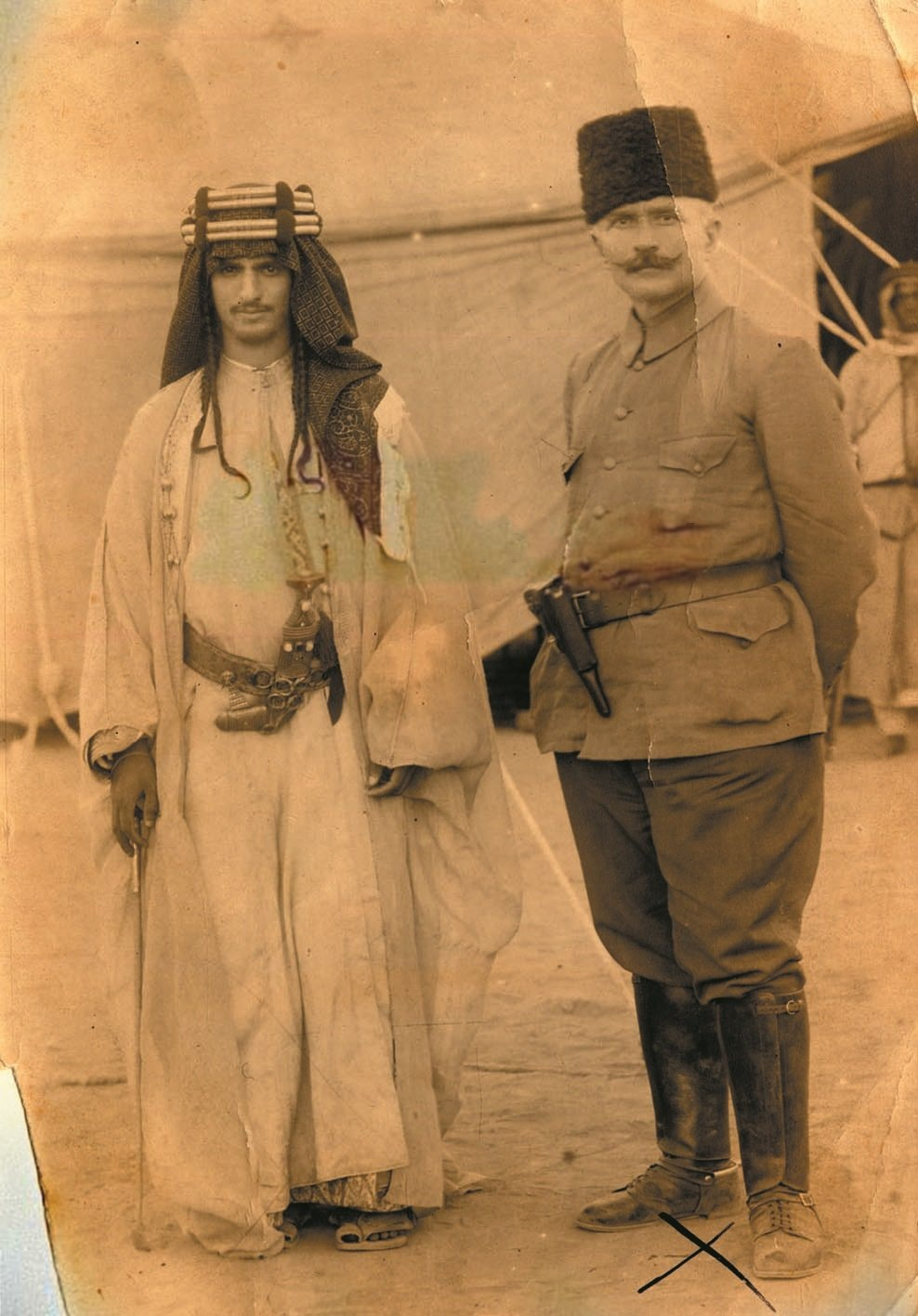
Saud bin Abdulaziz (left) with Fakhri Pasha (right)

Hamoud ruled as regent on Saud's behalf until his death in 1909. He was succeeded as regent by another member of the Al Sabhan family, Zamil bin Salem Al Sabhan. Zamil ruled until 1914 when Saud and his cousin Saud bin Saleh Al Sabhan conspired his assassination, supposedly in part due to a dispute over whether to cut off relations with Ibn Saud, which Zamil favored keeping, while Saud was pro-Turk and opposed. After the assassination of Zamil, Saud gained control over the emirate and Saud Al Sabhan became his minister.

During World War I, Saud allied himself with the Ottoman Empire. He launched Battle of Jarrab against Ibn Saud in 1915, which resulted in a Rashidi victory after the removal of Ajman forces from Saudi side and the death of Ibn Saud's British advisor, William Shakespear. His rule was influenced by his grandmother Fatima bint Zamel Al Sabhan, who hated the Saudis and Wahhabism and managed the treasury.

In 1920, he was assassinated by his cousin, Abdullah bin Talal. One of his widows, Fahda bint Asi bin Shuraim Al Shammari of the Abda section of the Shammar tribe, remarried Ibn Saud, becoming his ninth wife and the mother of King Abdullah of Saudi Arabia.

Saud bin Abdulaziz Al Rashid House of Rashid Born: ~ 1897 Died: 1920
Regnal titles
Preceded by Saʿūd bin Hammūd	Emir of the House of Rashid; 1908 – 1920	Succeeded by ʿAbdullah bin Mutʿib
