= Mawqaq =

City and Governorate in Hail Province, Saudi Arabia

Mawqaq Governorate محافظة الموقق
- City and Governorate
- Location of Mawqaq governorate in Hail Province

- Location in Saudi Arabia
- Coordinates: 27.3781°N 41.1803°E
- Country: Saudi Arabia
- Province: Hail Province
- Region: Najd
- Seat: Mawqaq City

Government
  - Type: Municipality
  - Body: Mawqaq Municipality

Population (2022)
  - Metro: 16,835 (Mawqaq Governorate)
- Time zone: UTC+03:00 (SAST)
- Area code: 016

Mawqaq (Arabic: الموقق, romanized: Al-Mawqaq) is a city and governorate in the southwestern part of Hail Province, Saudi Arabia. It lies approximately 80 kilometers from the center of Hail City. Mawqaq is considered one of the oldest and most populous towns in the region and includes numerous smaller villages within its territory.

== History ==
The town of Mawqaq was first documented by the Finnish traveler George August Galin during his visit in 1847. He described it as "situated to the northwest of Mount Aja" and noted that it was "one of the most populous settlements in the province," with over 220 families residing there.

In 1915, British orientalist Louis Mouzel visited the area and included a description of Mawqaq in his book North of Najd. However, he made no mention of the numerous inscriptions and rock carvings later identified in the surrounding mountains.

Archaeological features in the region are concentrated in the mountains and plateaus located to the north and northwest of Mawqaq. These include the remnants of ancient structures—primarily palaces and edifices—constructed atop elevated plateaus. Only scattered ruins and fallen stones remain visible today. A few kilometers north of the town, researchers have identified what appears to be the entrance to a large palace or temple situated on a mountain. Adjacent to this site are a significant number of rock inscriptions.

The inscriptions are in a variety of scripts: ancient South Arabian (Al-Musnad), Kufic, and others that require specialist interpretation. One of the clearest inscriptions is written in Al-Musnad. The surrounding rock surfaces also bear numerous carvings and drawings, including depictions of animals such as camels and horses, as well as scenes of mounted figures wielding long spears. Other carvings appear to represent tools resembling plows and combs.

These inscriptions and drawings were carved using deep engraving techniques with sharp iron tools. However, natural erosion has obscured many of them, making accurate interpretation difficult. Further archaeological study and excavation by experts are needed to better understand the historical and cultural significance of these sites.

== Geography ==
The governorate of Mawqaq is located within a broad valley that extends from north to south. It lies along the continuation of several wadis (seasonal rivers), including Wadi Al-Rasfin, Wadi Al-Bayyat, and Wadi Al-Rutiq, which originate from the Mount Aja range. Mawqaq is bordered by the Nafud desert, which stretches northward toward the Al-Jawf Province.

To the east and south lie the prominent massifs of Mount Aja and Mount Jargh, while to the west are expansive plains interspersed with small mountains and plateaus. The governorate sits at an elevation of approximately 1,200 meters (3,937 feet) above sea level. Nearby, Mount Qadran (also known as Samra) rises to about 6,000 feet (1,829 meters). Mawqaq is also intersected by the international highway linking Hail, al-Ula, and Tabuk.

=== Topography ===
One of the most prominent geographical features of Mawqaq is the Aja mountain range, which serves as a natural barrier to the east and south of the governorate. This range separates Mawqaq from the city of Hail and spans over 30 kilometers in width and more than 100 kilometers in length.

=== Aja Mountain Range ===
The Aja mountain range and its extensions surround Mawqaq and form a defining feature of its landscape. The range stretches over 100 kilometers, from the village of Al-Hafir in the east to Al-Fayda in the west. The eastern side borders the city of Hail, while Mawqaq lies to the west.

Notable peaks and features in this range include:

- Mount Jargh
- Mount Al-Kur
- Mount Hayyah
- Mount Dhali'ah
- Mount Saihan
- Hibal Al-Yasser
- Mount Umm Al-Hammam
- Mount Abu Jurf
- Mount Balta
- Mount Qadran
- Mount Shout
- Mount Abu Suwair
- Mount Sahi
- Mount Shaqraa
- Mount Al-Baydiyat
- Mount Al-Safraa
- Mount Al-Rutiq
- Mount Khashit
- Mount Radfin
- Mount Nabtal
- Mount Al-Jadida
- Mount Kahfah

=== Habran Mountain Range ===
Located approximately 90 kilometers north of Mawqaq near the village of Al-Muhafar, the Habran mountain range is historically notable for its population of gazelles and bustards. It lies within the greater Nafud desert region.

The name "Habran" appears in classical Arabic literature, including the geographical encyclopedia Mu'jam al-Buldan by Yaqut al-Hamawi (Volume 2, p. 244), and in poetry by the pre-Islamic poet Zayd al-Khayl, who referenced the mountain and its surrounding features in his descriptions. The area includes several significant landmarks such as:

- The Triangle
- Shifa Al-Bin
- The Markets
- Aba Al-Dharouq
- Ghar Zamil

=== Al-Masma Mountain Range ===
The Al-Masma Mountain Range runs roughly north–south for approximately 80 kilometers and includes a number of scattered mountains and plateaus. Key peaks and locations within the range include:

- Rokham Mountain – Located 40 kilometers west of the village of Tawiyah, north of Mawqaq
- Saq Mountain – Located 30 kilometers east of Tawiyah, near the village of Al-Hatti
- Al-Aaimda Mountain – 20 kilometers northwest of Mawqaq, near Hijrat Qasiriyat
- Jarquq Mountain – 15 kilometers west of Mawqaq
- Jadid Mountain – 15 kilometers north of Mawqaq
- Shahbara Mountain – 15 kilometers west of Mawqaq
- Ihtala Mountain – 8 kilometers north of Mawqaq
- Ibraq Ghawth Mountain – 2 kilometers north of Mawqaq
- Al-Khashab Mountain – 25 kilometers east of Mawqaq, near the village of Hafir
- Al-Abd Mountain – 10 kilometers east of Mawqaq.

== Geology ==
Mawqaq is located near the center of the geological region known as the "Palace Square," between 41°00′ and 41°20′ east longitude, and between 27°15′ and 27°30′ north latitude. The total area covers approximately 2,750 square kilometers.

The region is primarily composed of Cenozoic valley deposits consisting of gravel, sand, and dunes. Bedrock formations are also present, comprising a variety of rock types. In the eastern and southeastern parts of Mawqaq—particularly in the mountains of Umm Raqba, Dawir, and Jargh—alkaline feldspar monzogranite rocks are predominant. These rocks are rich in biotite and hornblende minerals.

To the east and west of Mawqaq, Jaber rock formations are found in the area of Mount Al-Abd. The local geological complex also includes metamorphic rocks, such as green schist and altered bedrock, as well as plagioclase-rich granitic and dioritic rocks. In addition, numerous basaltic dykes—volcanic intrusions—can be observed, typically aligned in northwest and east–west directions.

In the southern region of Mawqaq, fine-grained red granite formations are notable. The city lies within the Arabian Shield, a geologic formation characterized by limited groundwater resources. As a result, the region depends largely on rainfall, with wells generally reaching depths of up to 70 meters.

== Ecological diversity ==
The Mawqaq region is home to a variety of native flora adapted to the arid and semi-arid climate of northwestern Saudi Arabia. Prominent plant species in the area include:

Haloxylon salicornicum (Arfaj), Artemisia (Wormwood), Abiathran, Artemisia judaica (a type of desert Artemisia), Qarta, Qahwian, Sama'a, Katad, Rabla, Ranunculus (Buttercup), Nafl, Terba, Basbas, Jahak, Achillea fragrantissima (Qaisum), Sabt, Hanabazi, Althaea officinalis (Marshmallow), Nasi, Hamat, Numbers, Hawa, Titan, Khubaiz (possibly Malva species), Haloxylon (Ramth), and Faqaa (also known as Terfezia or desert truffle).

Other local plants include Al-Awshiz, Al-Thail, and Al-Saadan, which are commonly found in sandy and rocky terrains of the region.

== Tourism ==
The governorate of Mawqaq is considered one of the most notable tourist destinations in the Hail Province, primarily due to its distinctive natural landscapes, including valleys, sand dunes, and vegetation-rich areas. The region is known for a number of prominent valleys, such as Haya, Al-Bayyat, Al-Rutiq, Al-Radafin, Al-Dhabih, and Dhikhin. These valleys originate from the slopes of the Mount Aja and extend northward toward the Nafud Desert.

To the west of the governorate lie expansive plains that, along with the valleys and parts of the Nafud Desert, become lush and green during the spring season. This seasonal transformation enhances the area's appeal as a destination for nature enthusiasts and visitors seeking desert landscapes with seasonal flora.

== Transportation ==
=== Air ===
The main airport serving Mawqaq Governorate is Hail International Airport, offering regular domestic flights and select international routes. The airport is easily reachable from Mawqaq by road, making it the primary hub for air travel in the area.

=== Rail ===
Mawqaq is connected to Saudi Arabia’s national railway network via Hail railway station in Hail city, part of the Riyadh–Qurayyat railway managed by Saudi Arabia Railways. The station provides scheduled services to major destinations such as Riyadh, Al-Qassim, Al-Jawf, and Qurayyat, supporting both passenger and cargo transport.

== See also ==
- Provinces of Saudi Arabia
- List of governorates of Saudi Arabia
- List of cities and towns in Saudi Arabia
