= Jabal Aja Protected Area =

Jabal Aja Protected Area (Arabic: محمية جبل آجا) is a protected area in northern Saudi Arabia. It consists of a red granite mountain range projecting from a flatter area and is of importance for both plant and animal life. It lies at 27°30'N and 41°30'E close to the town of Ha'il and has a total area of around 200,000 hectares (490,000 acres). Jabal Aja has been designated an Important Plant Area and an Important Bird and Biodiversity Area.

== Geography ==
Jabal Aja is a granite mountain range about 100 km (62 mi) long and 10 to 35 km (6 to 22 mi) wide with an area of about 2,000 km^{2} (770 mi^{2}). The mountains are criss-crossed by straight valleys that have developed along fault lines and have an altitude varying between 900 and 1,550 m (3,000 and 5,100 ft). The mountain probably receives more rainfall than the surrounding area where Ha'il averages about 116 mm (4.6 in). This falls mainly in winter, mostly from storms approaching from the southwest, and frost is not unusual. Jabal Aja is situated to the west and southwest of the town of Ha'il and the protected area has been extended to the northeast to include an area of arid flattish terrain with low sandstone hills and granite outcrops extending to the edge of the An Nafud desert.

== Flora and fauna ==
Jabal Aja has been designated an Important Plant Area because of the richness of its plant life and the presence of many endemic and relict plant species. The reserve offers a refuge to plants from the Mediterranean and Irano-Turanian regions in an area that otherwise forms part of the Saharo-Arabian region. About 355 species of plant have been recorded in the reserve, including the plants found in the adjoining desert area of An Nafud.

The plains have deep sandy-loam soils and the dominant plant is Haloxylon salicornicum, with the desert gourd being common and Asphodelus tenuifolius occurring in depressions. The annual plants Stipa tortilis, Picris cyanocarpa and Anthemis appear after rains. On the thin slopes below the rocks, Vachellia gerrardi is dominant and is accompanied by other woody shrubs such as Searsia, Periploca, Gymnocarpos and Ephedra foliata. In the wadis and runnels, more Acacia gerrardi grows, associated with Lycium shawii, Pulicaria undulata, Ochradenus baccatus and Zilla spinosa.

The combined area of Jabal Aja and Northern Ha'il has been designated an Important Bird and Biodiversity Area because of its importance as a centre for migratory birds especially the demoiselle crane (Grus virgo). Among the important species resident in the reserve are the sand partridge, griffon vulture, Egyptian vulture, desert owl and pale rockfinch. Among the migratory species that visit the reserve in passage or over-winter here are Menetries's warbler, white-throated robin, Finsch's wheatear, cinereous bunting and several species of cranes.

Mammals found in the park include the Arabian wolf, sand cat and Nubian ibex, and there are a number of species of reptile and amphibian.

In 1973, the country's last known cheetahs were reported in the vicinity of Ha'il.

== See also ==
- Ha'il region
- Salma Mountains
