= El Surar, Valencia =

Spanish natural park

El Surar Municipal Natural Park
- El Surar
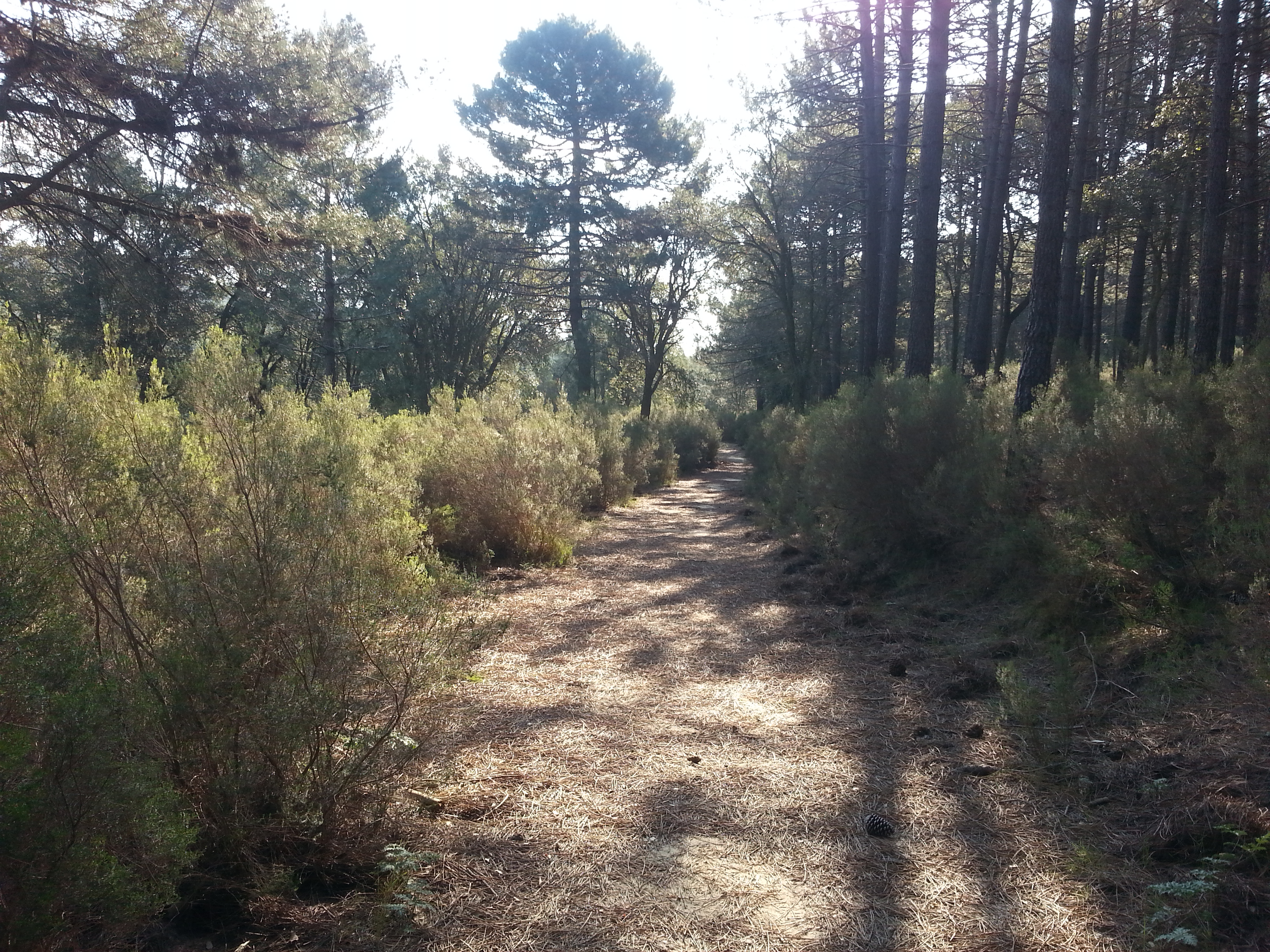
- Pla de Junquera, El Surar

- Location within Valencian Community
- Location: Province of Valencia; Valencian Community, Spain
- Nearest city: Gandia
- Coordinates: 38°59′N 0°18′W.
- Area: 8.38 km^{2} (3.24 sq mi)
- Established: 2005

El Surar (in Spanish, El Paraje Natural Municipal de El Surar) is a Municipal Natural Park located in the east of Spain, within the comarca of Vall d'Albaida in the autonomous community of Valencia; it is shared between the municipalities of Pinet and Llutxent.

El Surar is the southernmost cork oak forest in Valencia. It consists of a series of open copses that are the remains of more extensive, older forests. Unlike the cork forests located further to the north of the Valencian Community, it has the singularity of inhabiting soils evolved from calcareous subsoils. Cork oak forests usually occur in siliceous soils, and as such its presence in El Surar is explained by the intense rainfall recorded in the area, which washes away the soil and results in high levels of decarbonisation and acidification.

El Surar was declared Municipal Natural Park by Generalitat Valenciana on March 4, 2005.

The Municipal Natural Park of Parpalló-Borrell is to be found in the adjacent municipality of Barx.

== Etymology ==
The name "El Surar" is derived from the Valencian term suro, meaning “cork”.

== Climate ==
The area enjoys a typically Mediterranean climate, characterised by hot summers and relatively cold winters, with an average of two snowfalls per year. Precipitation averages from 500 to 800 mm

== Geography ==
The park, which occupies an area of some 837.81 hectares, is located at the head of a series of gullies that flow into the River Piner in the area of Sierra de Marchuquera, within the municipalities of Pinet and Llutxent. At an altitude of around 600 meters above sea level, it provides panoramic views of the surrounding mountains, deep ravines and the coast at nearby towns of Gandia and Xeraco.

== Flora and fauna ==
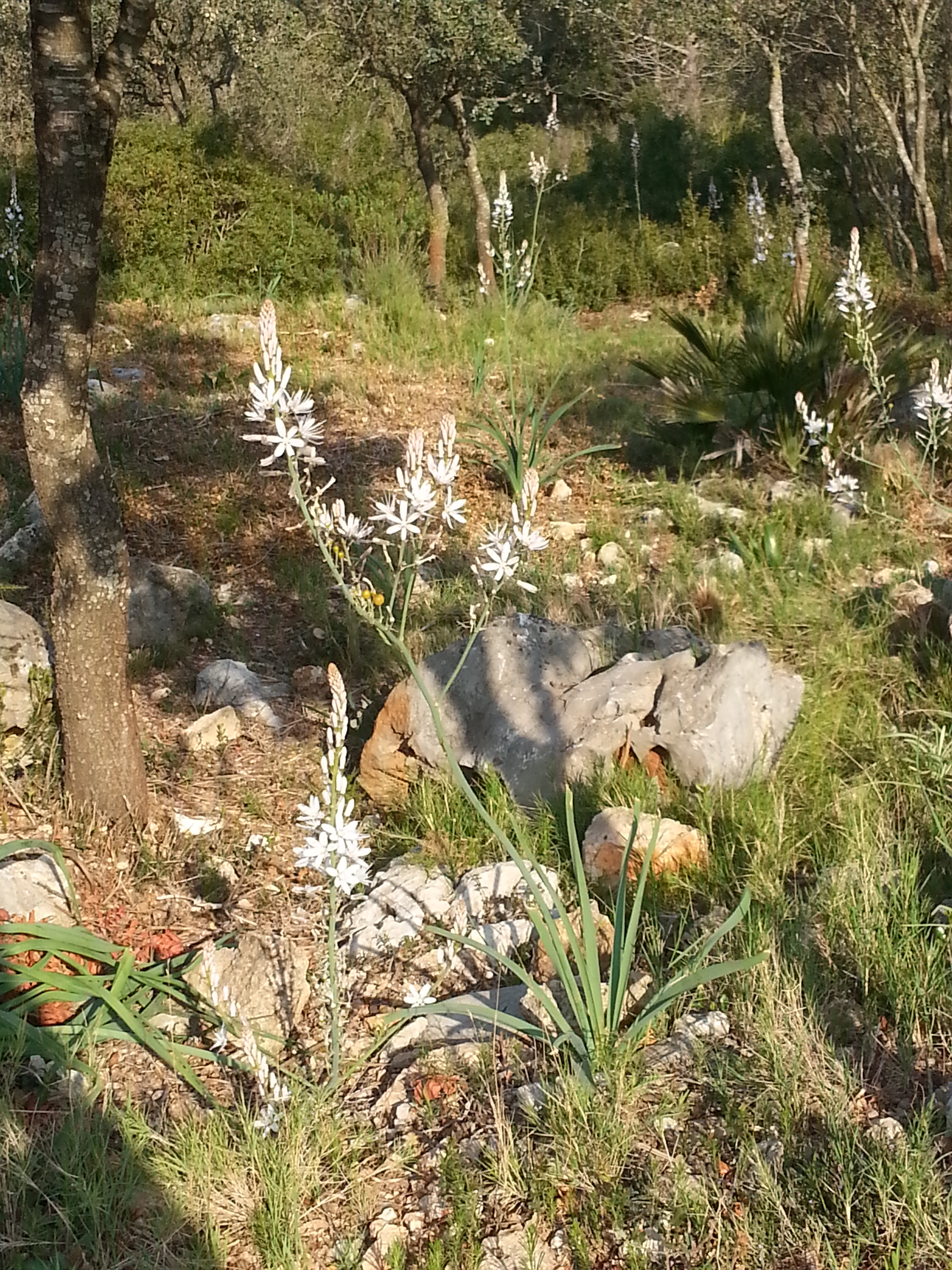
Typical underbrush in El Surar

The area is host to two flora micro-reserves, called "Pla de Junquera" and "Els Miradors".

The flora found in El Surar is somewhat different to that found in other Valencian cork oak forests: there is an absence of silicic species, such as tree heath, whilst others more commonly found in holm oak forests are present: daphne, kermes oak, rosemary, etc.

The forest is also host to a wide range of Mediterranean shrubland fauna, including wild boar and rabbit, as well as golden eagle, falcon, owl, hare, common quail, partridge and lizard, among other species

== Route of the Monasteries of Valencia ==
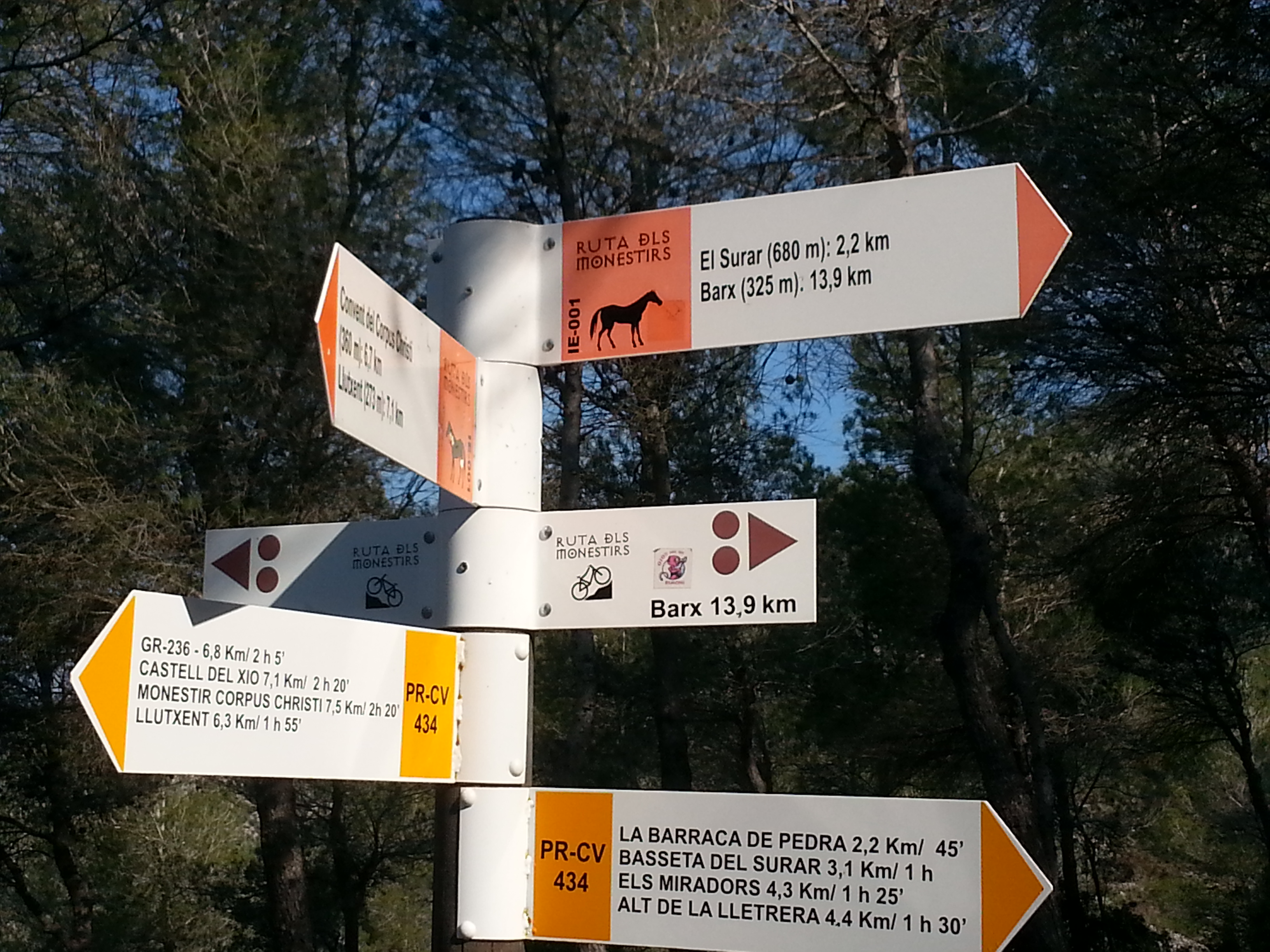
Signpost indicating Route of the Monasteries of Valencia in El Surar

El Surar lies on a variant of the Route of the Monasteries of Valencia (GR-236), a monumental and cultural route that connects five monasteries located in the south of the Province of Valencia.

Of the four different itineraries available, three (by foot, by Mountain bike and on horseback) cross El Surar, following signposted riding trails, forest tracks and old roads.

By foot, the route takes approximately 3-4 days.

The Route was inaugurated in 2008.

== Access ==
El Surar can be accessed by signposted forest tracks from the villages of Pinet, Llutxent and Barx.

== Gallery ==
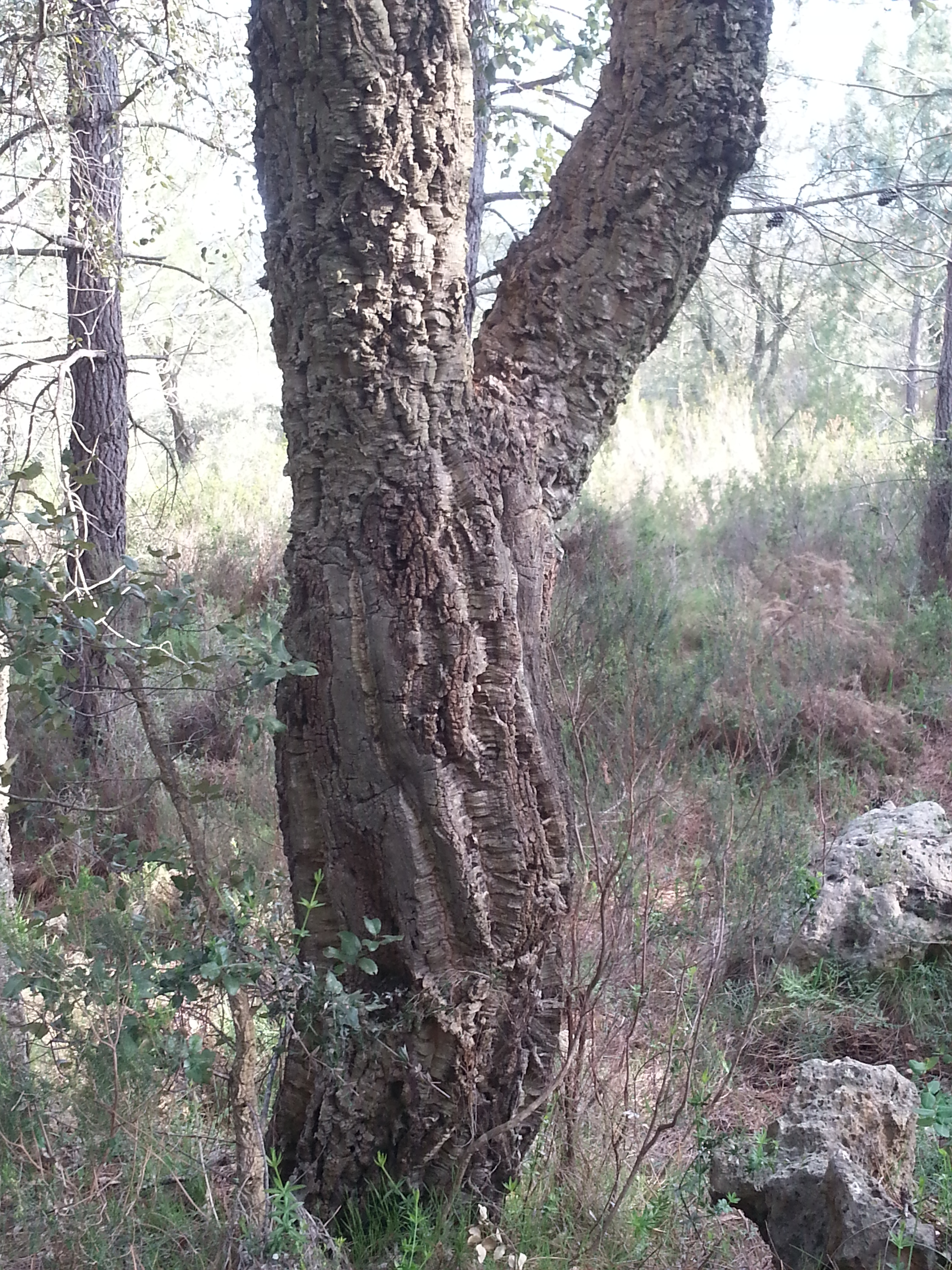
Cork tree in El Surar

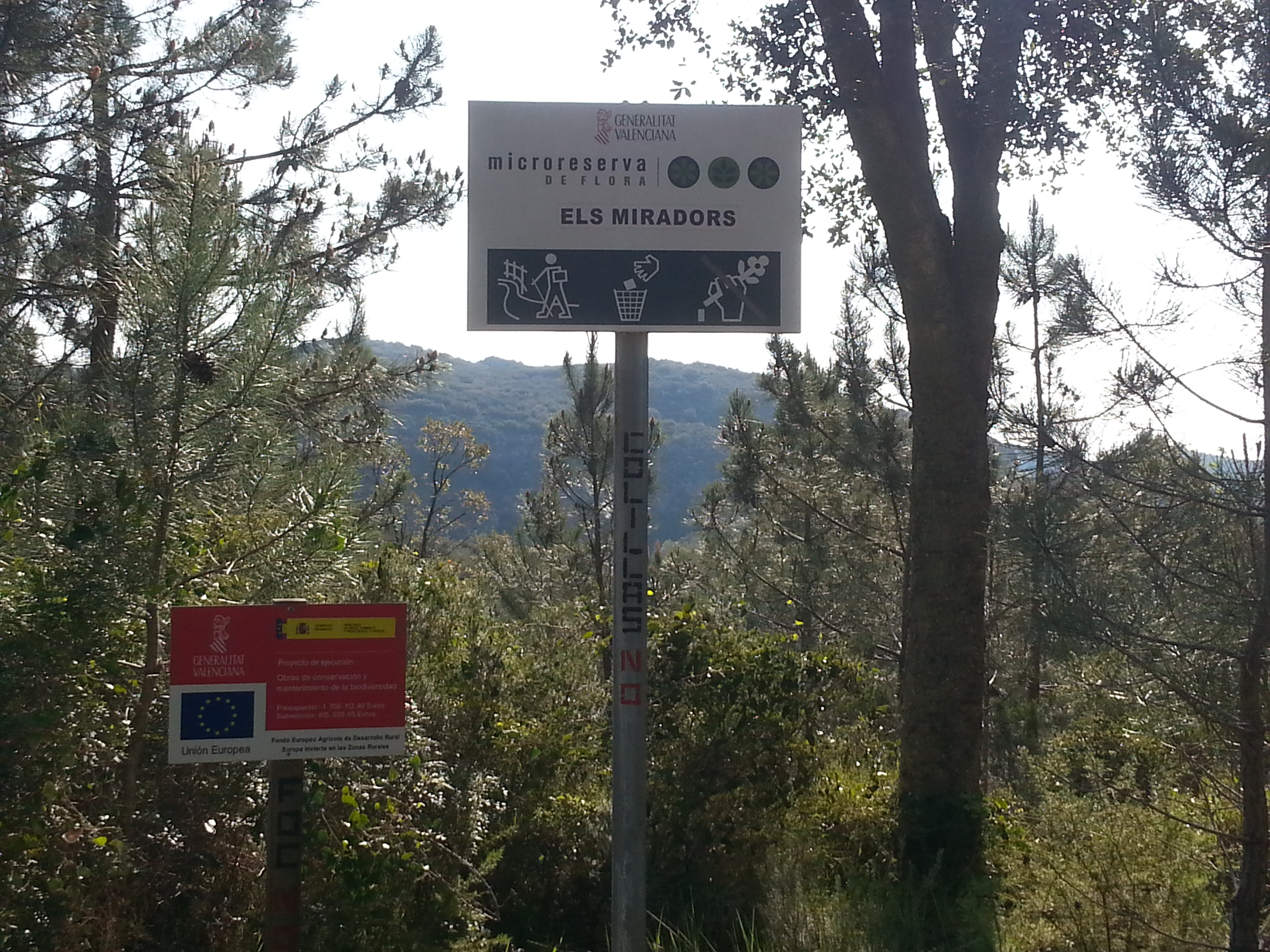
Entry to Els Miradors Flora Micro-reserve in El Surar

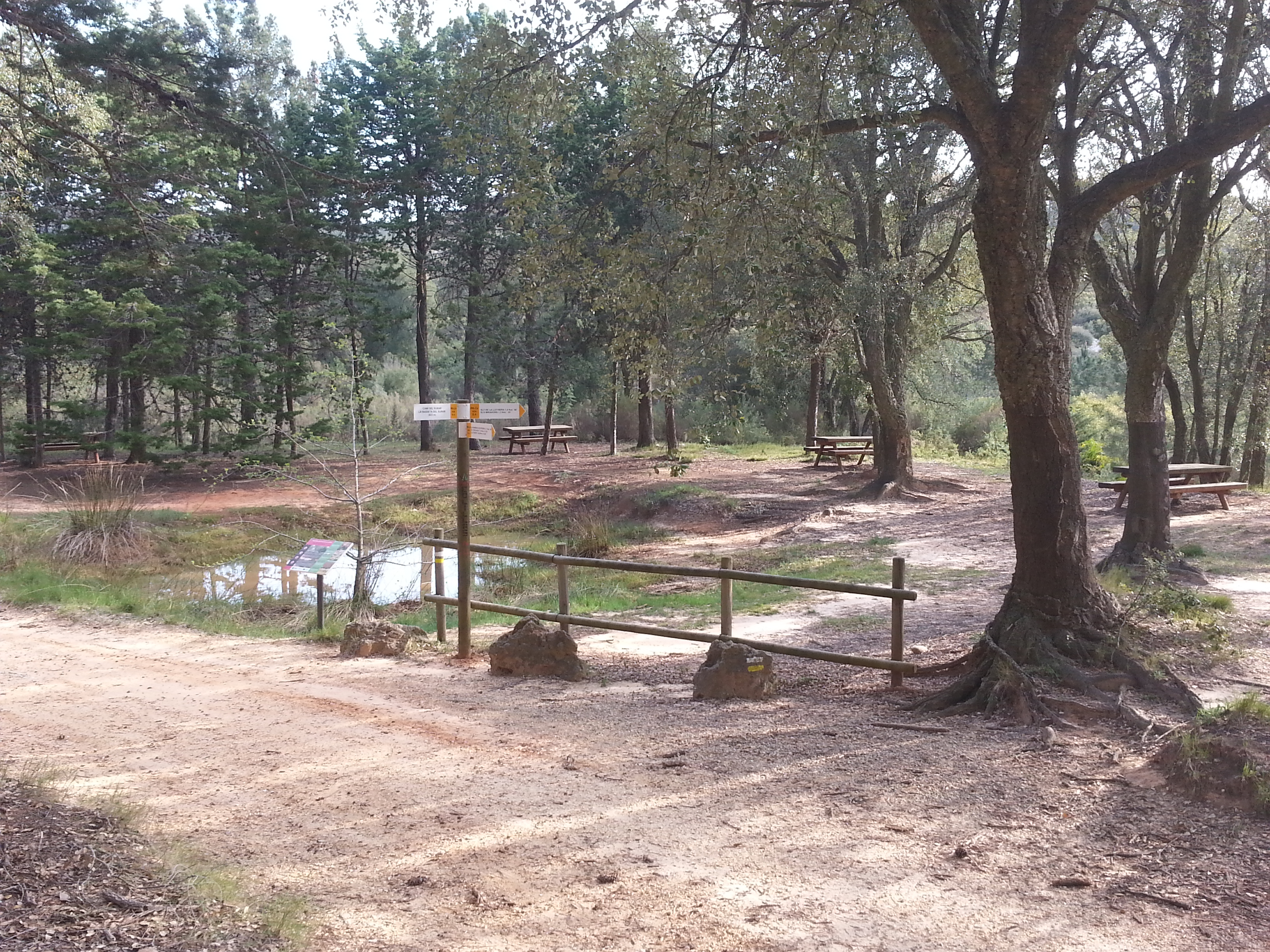
Picnic area at Bassa del Surar in El Surar

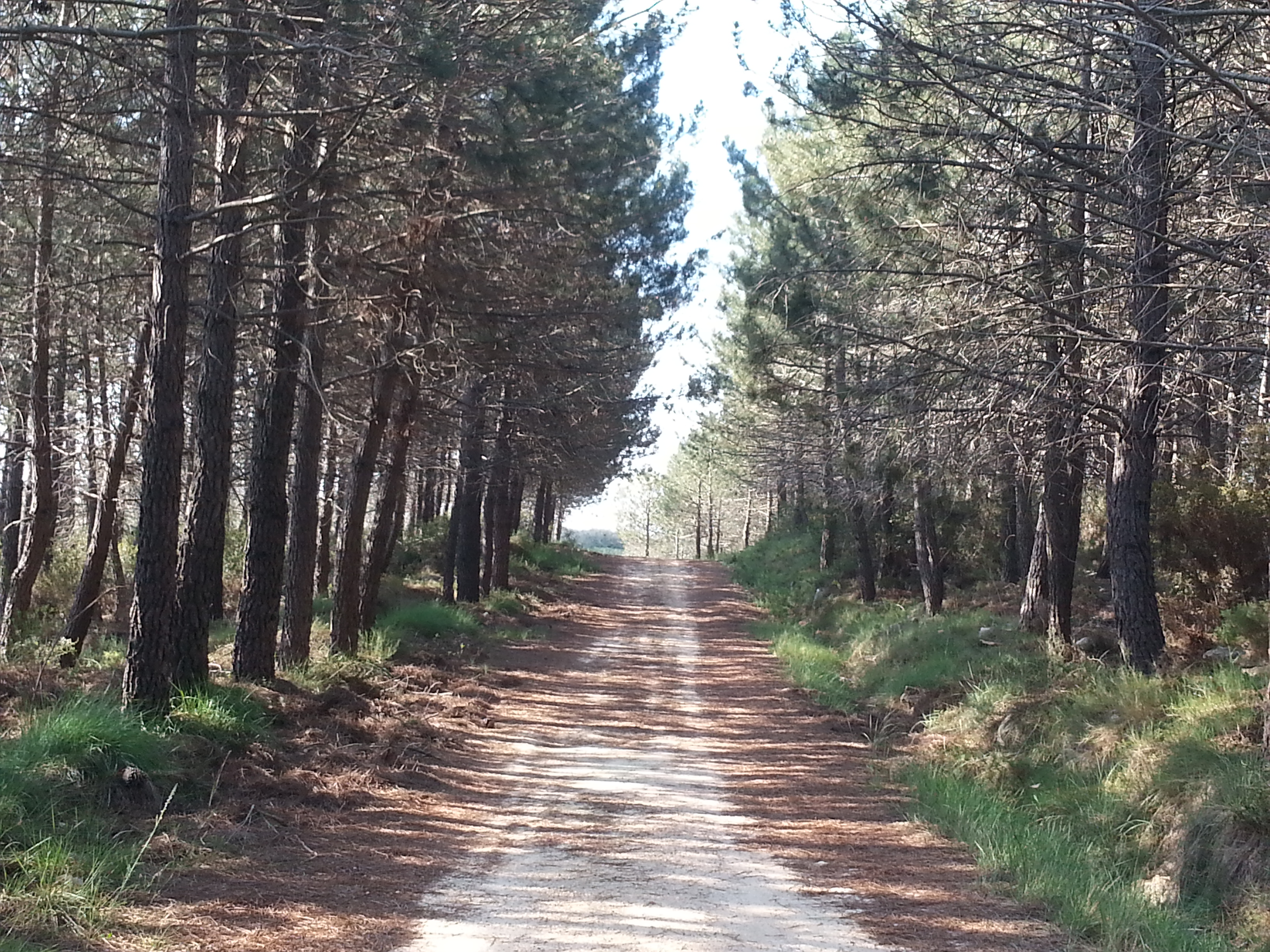
Forest track running through El Surar

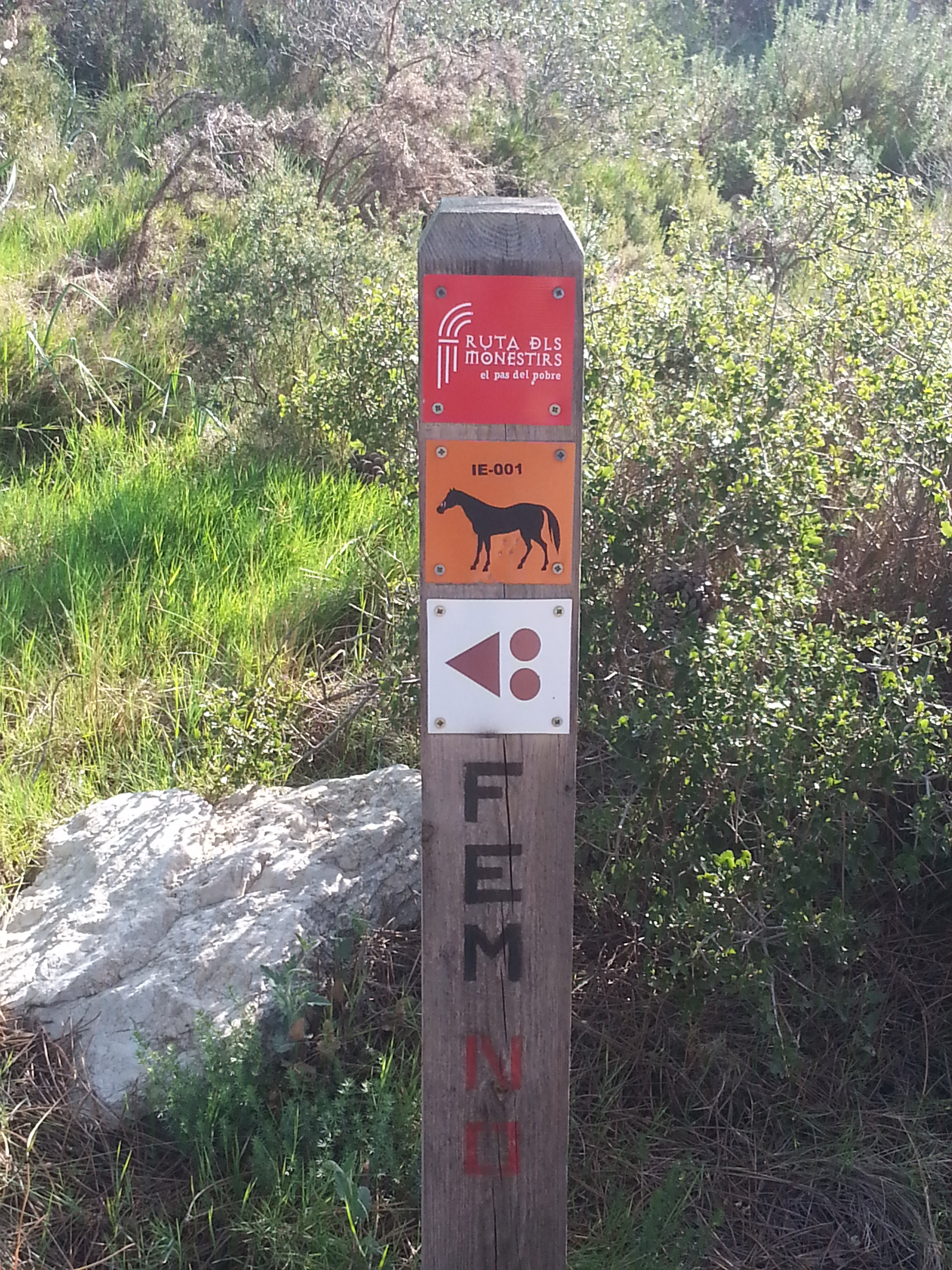
Route of the Monasteries of Valencia signpost in El Surar
