= Jubbah, Saudi Arabia =

Jubbah جبة
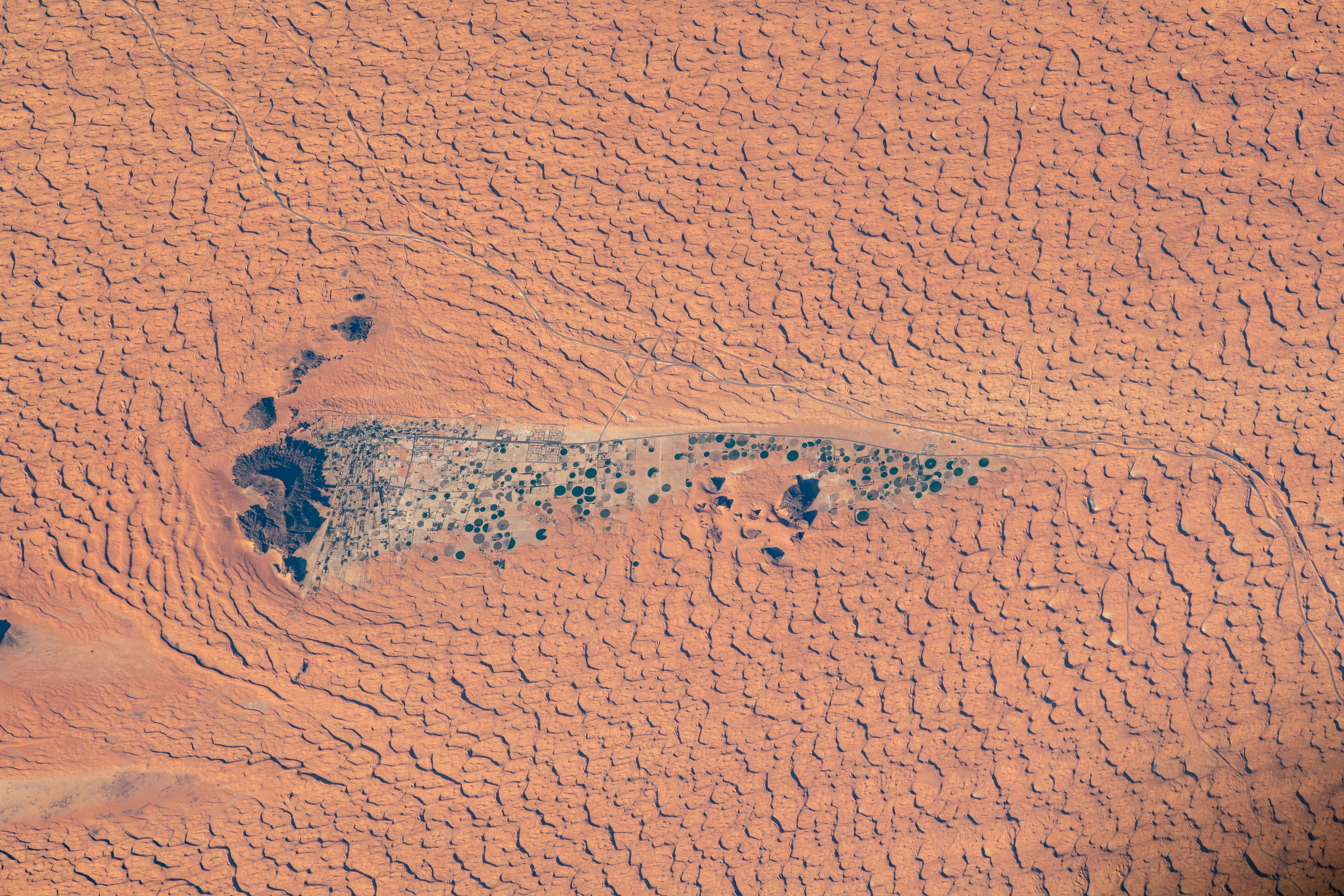
- Jubbah seen from the International Space Station

- Location of Jubbah within Saudi Arabia
- Coordinates: 28.02°N 40.94°E
- Country: Saudi Arabia
- Region: Ha'il Province

Population
  - Total: 5,622
- Time zone: UTC+3 (AST)
  - Summer (DST): UTC+3 (AST)

Jubbah (Arabic: جبة) or Jubbat Ha'il (Arabic: جبة حائل, Jubbah of Ha'il) is a city in Ha'il Region, Saudi Arabia, 90 kilometres (56 mi) north-west of the city of Ha'il. The city lies on the old caravan road between Najd and the eastern Mediterranean Sea. Although completely surrounded by the vast Nefud Desert, the oasis of Jubbah is known for its abundant agriculture and plentiful groundwater and has a population of 5,622.

== Geology ==
Jubbah lies on an ancient lake bed (paleolake) that measures at least 20 km by 4 km with its full extent concealed beneath wind-swept sand on its northern, southern and eastern boundaries. The exposed part of the paleolake lies downwind of the mountain of Jebel Umm Sanman to the west, which has diverted the westerly flow of sand around it, leaving a sand-free depression that filled with water during past humid periods. Several archaeological sites of human settlement from the Middle Paleolithic period were found around the margin of the paleolake. Stone artifacts found at these sites are pertinent to ongoing debates about the timing, nature and routes of Late Pleistocene human migrations.

== Rock art of Jubbah ==
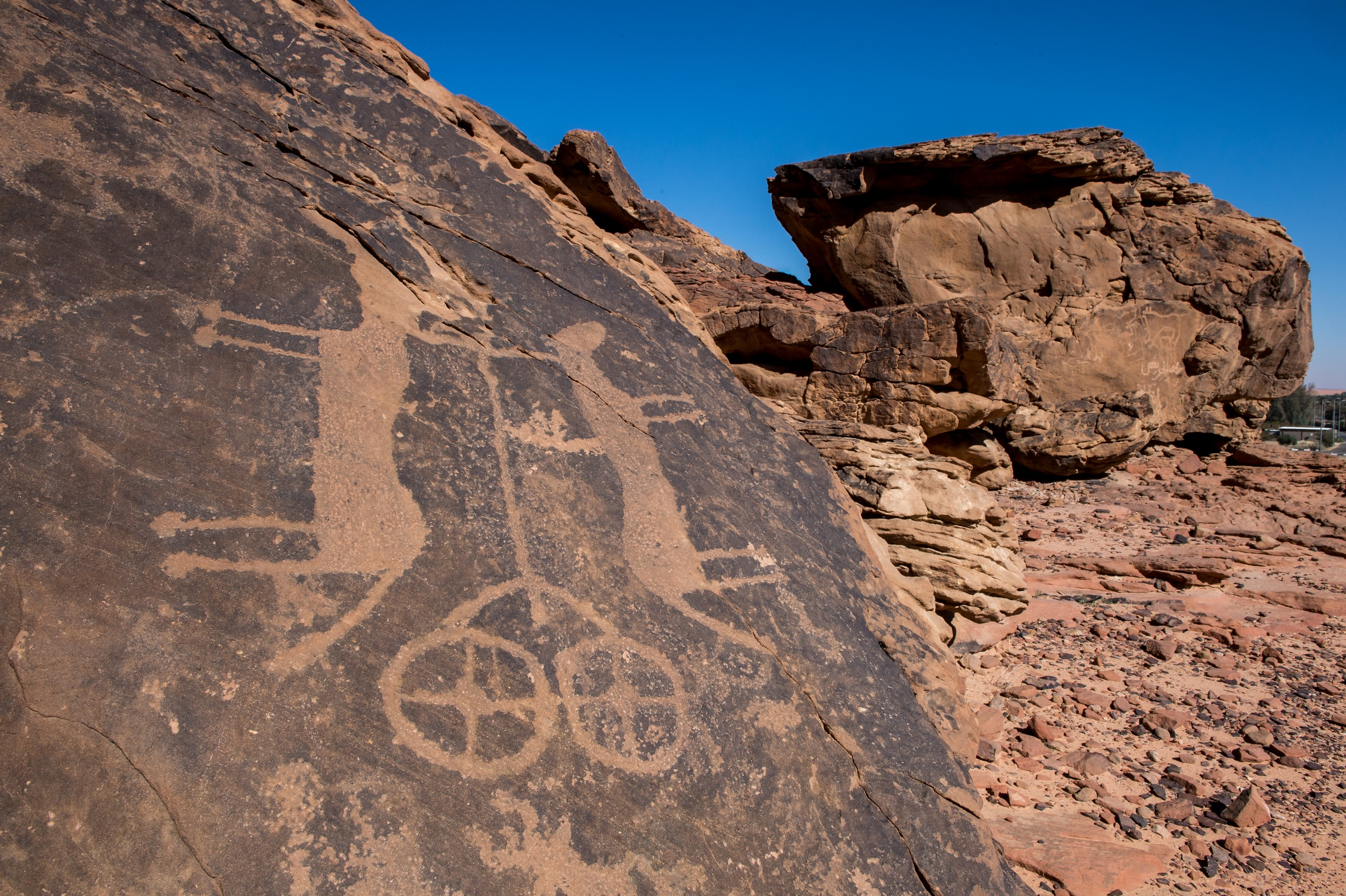
Rock art of Jubbah

Jubbah is surrounded by large sandstone outcrops that are filled with ancient petroglyphs and inscriptions on the rock face. Especially at Jebel Umm Sanman, which is designated a UNESCO World Heritage Site along with other locations of Rock Art in the Ha'il Region. Some of these rock carvings show men wearing headgear, birds, monkeys, gazelles, and two animals pulling a wheeled cart.

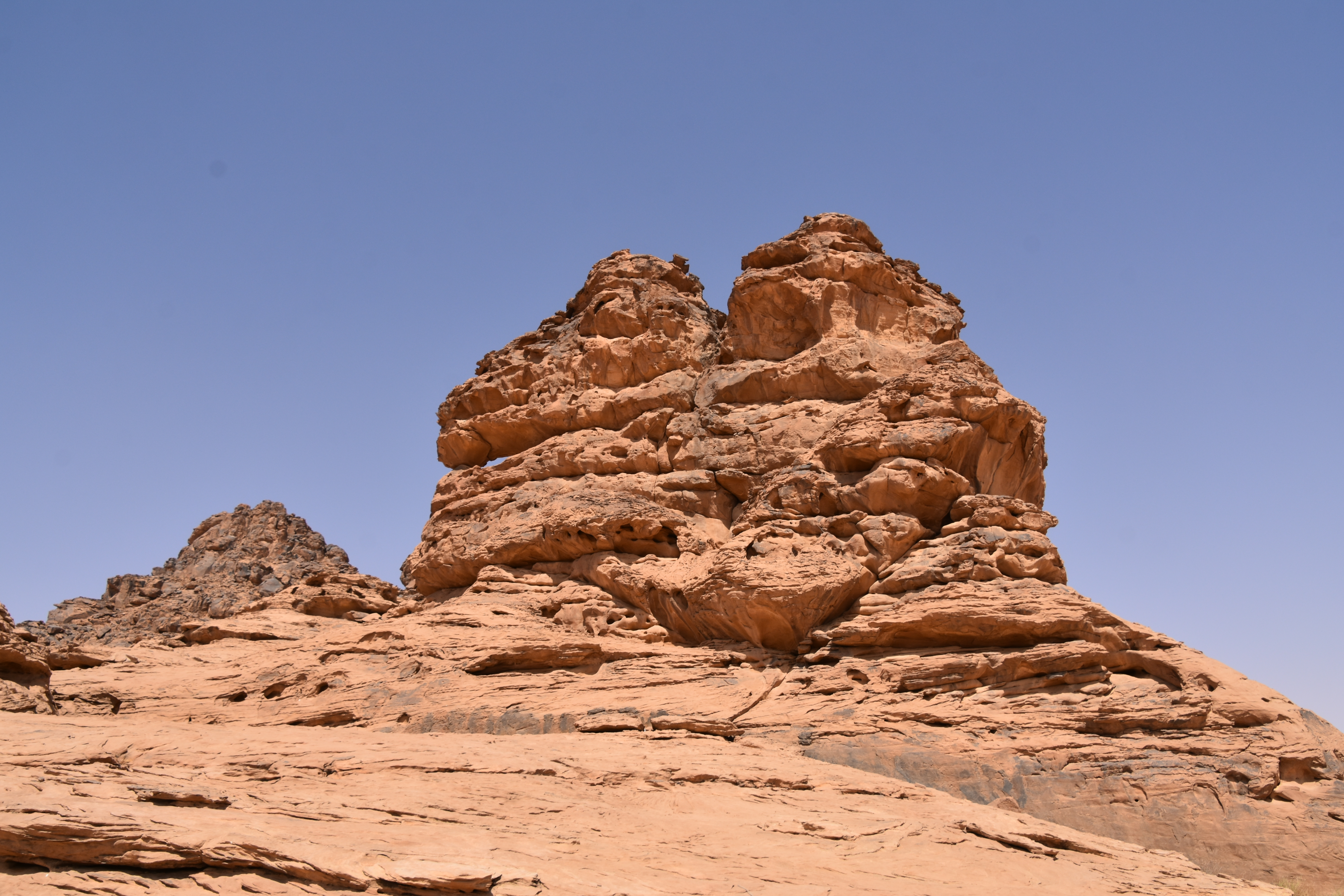
Large sandstone outcrops near UNESCO heritage site

Jubbah was visited by Anne Blunt and Finnish orientalist and explorer Georg August Wallin in 1845. Wallin described spacious mud houses, each house having an attached grove and a water well, where camels were used to pull the water. The town had 170 houses, all of them from Al Ramal clan of the Shammar tribe. They looked pale and skinny, and lived a similar life to Bedouins, although they were settled in permanent houses. The town was frequented by many bedouins especially during the date season (although Wallin thought their dates were not as good as those in Al Jawf and Tayma), but also for its fertile grazing lands.
