= Rock Art of Hail Province =

Rock Art in the Hail Region of Saudi Arabia
UNESCO World Heritage Site
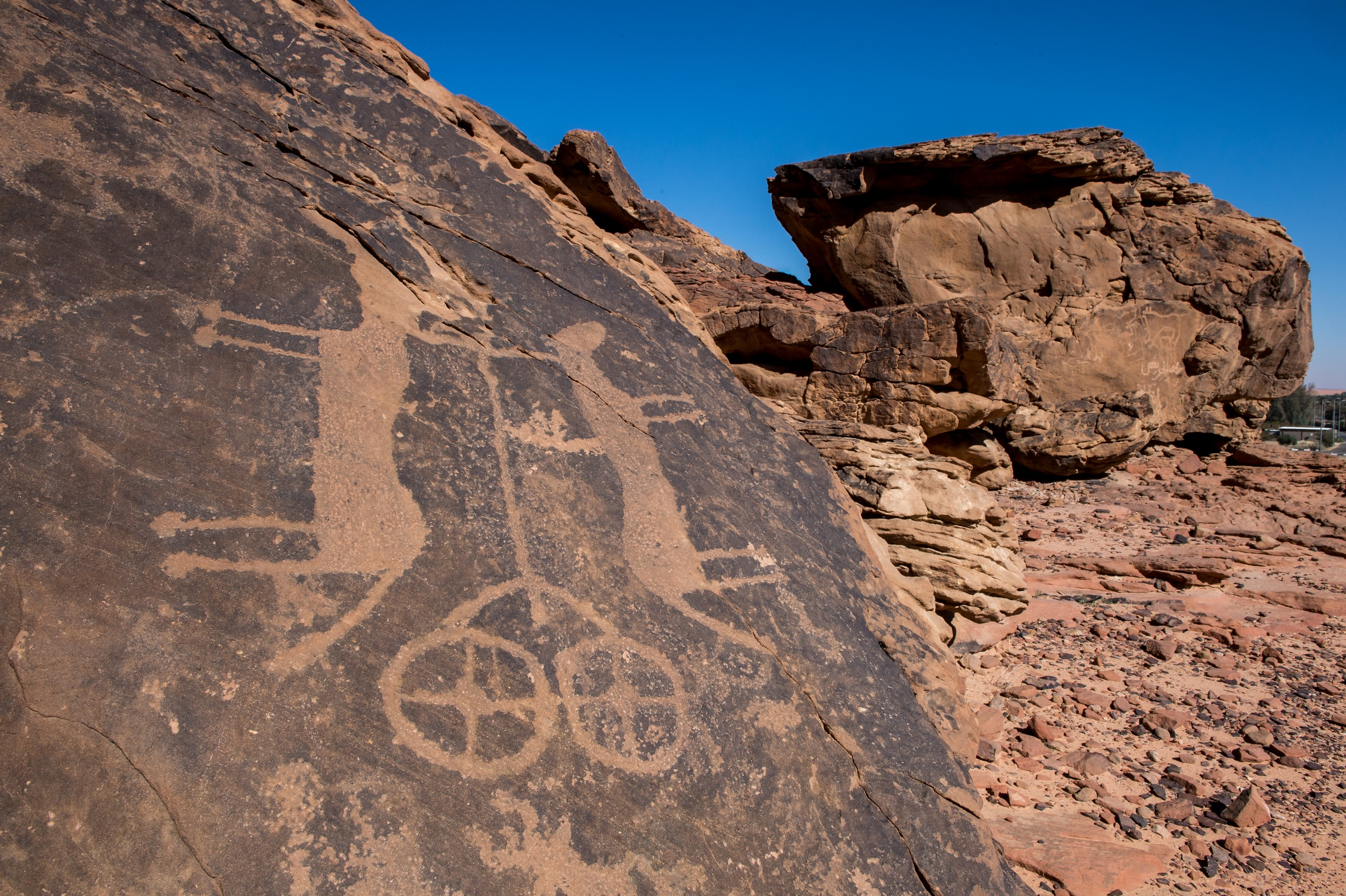
- Rock Art in the Hail Region

- Location within Saudi Arabia Location within West and Central Asia
- Location: Saudi Arabia
- Includes: 1. Jabal Umm Sinman; 2. Jabal al-Manjor and Jabal Raat
- Criteria: Cultural: (i), (iii)
- Reference: 1472
- Inscription: 2015 (39th Session)
- Area: 2,043.8 ha (5,050 acres)
- Buffer zone: 3,609.5 ha (8,919 acres)
- Coordinates: 28°0′38″N 40°54′47″E
- 1 = Jubbah site, 2 = Al-Shuwaymis site

Rock Art in the Ha'il Region (Arabic: الفنون الصخرية في منطقة حائل) is the fourth site in Saudi Arabia to be inscribed on the UNESCO List of World Heritage Sites. The rock art consists of two sites with petroglyphs and inscriptions situated in the desert of the Ha'il Region:

- Jabel Umm mountain (Arabic: جبل أم سنمان) at the city of Jubbah 90 km northwest of Ha'il within the Nafud desert.
- Jabal Al-Manjor (Arabic: جبل المنجور) and jabal Raat (Arabic: جبل راطا) at Al-Shuwaymis 250 km southwest of Ha'il on the border between the provinces of Ha’il and Medina.

On both sites an ancient population left traces of their passings in petroglyphs on the rock's surface, holding 8,000 years of history.

== Inscription criteria ==
In its 39th session in 2015 the committee added both sites to the UNESCO World Heritage List. Criteria for the inscription are the exceptionally large number of petroglyphs, containing stunning expressions of the human creative genius. The petroglyphs provide an exceptional testimony to the challenges of past societies in response to environmental catastrophes. The Saudi Commission for Tourism has sought to further protect the cultural site. Both sites have guards and monitoring arrangements for the rock art. A management plan for their long-term protection and development was prepared as part of the World Heritage nomination.

== Description ==
The petroglyphs of Jubbah are located at the eastern flanks of jabal Umm Sinman. The hills, rising to a height of 1264 m above sea level and almost 450 m above the surrounding Nafud desert, once overlooked a paleolake, up to 20 km long and 5 km wide. The panels feature different rock art traditions over the last 10,000 years and reflect major economic and cultural adjustments to climate change. The oldest petroglyphs display animals such as the ibex, which was revered by early Neolithic. As cattle and horses were domesticated, they were added to the art. With increased desiccation and the drying up of lakes 3000 years ago, camels became essential and are illustrated in abundance alongside Thamudic and Arabic script.

Jabals al-Manjor and Raat are rock escarpments in a now sand-covered wadi at Shuwaymis. The petroglyphs include figures of men, animals, palm trees and feet impressions.

A study of the rock art at Shuwaymis and Jubbah documented 147 hunting scenes involving dogs. Lines connecting some of the dogs to hunters were interpreted as leashes, which the researchers identified as the earliest known evidence of their use. The scenes were attributed to the seventh and possibly the eighth millennium BC, although the engravings could not be dated directly.

== Gallery ==
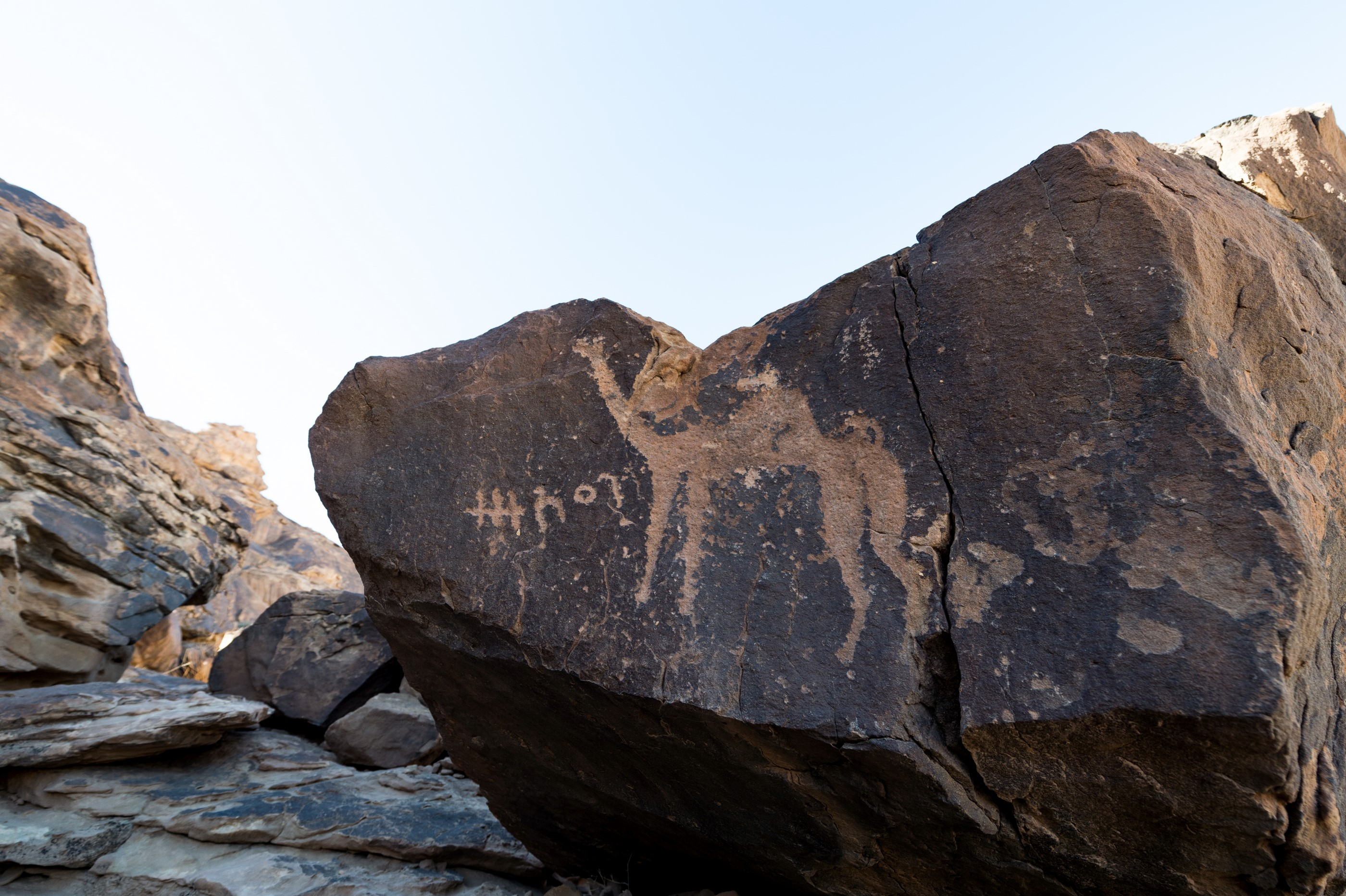

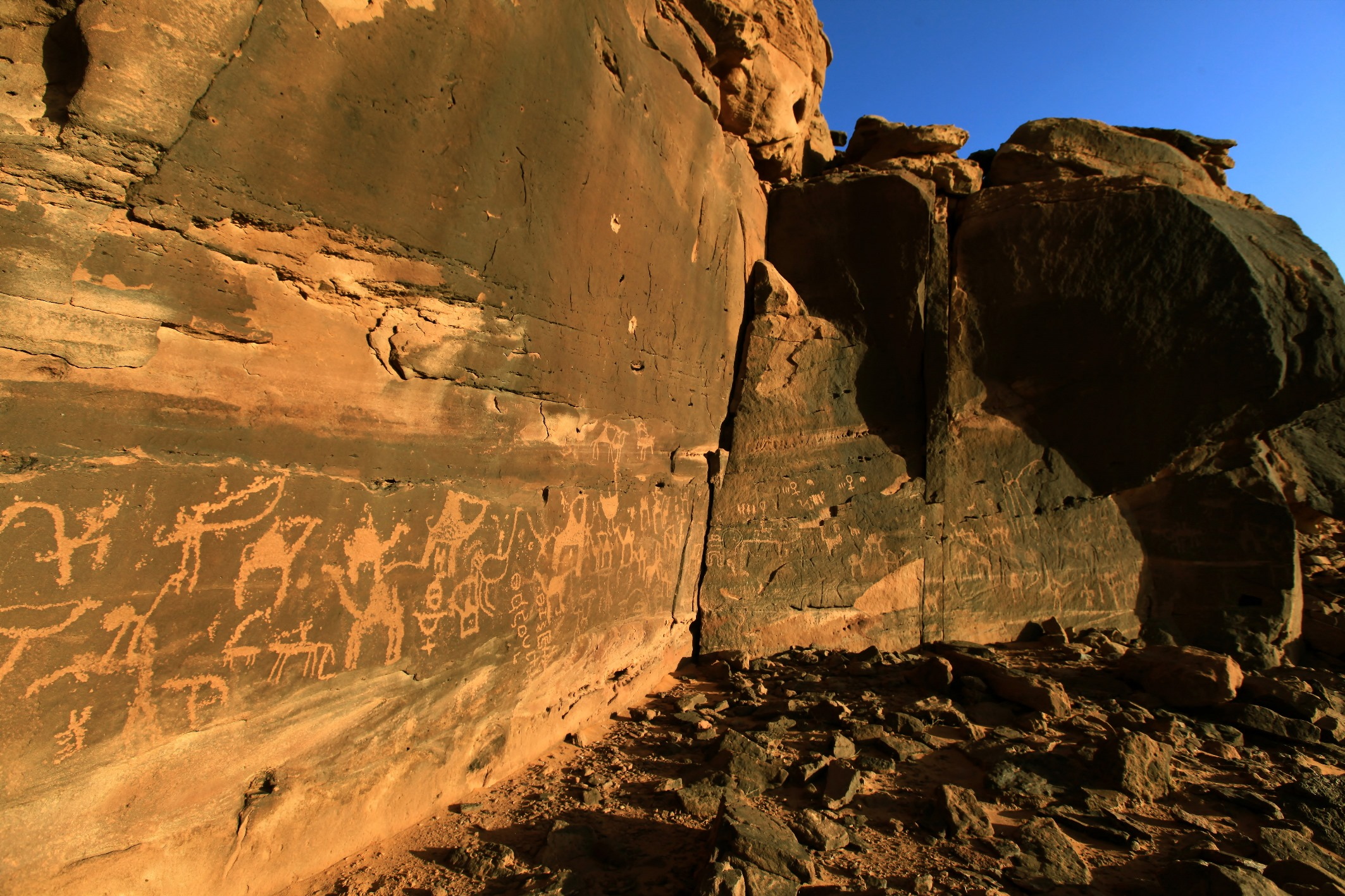

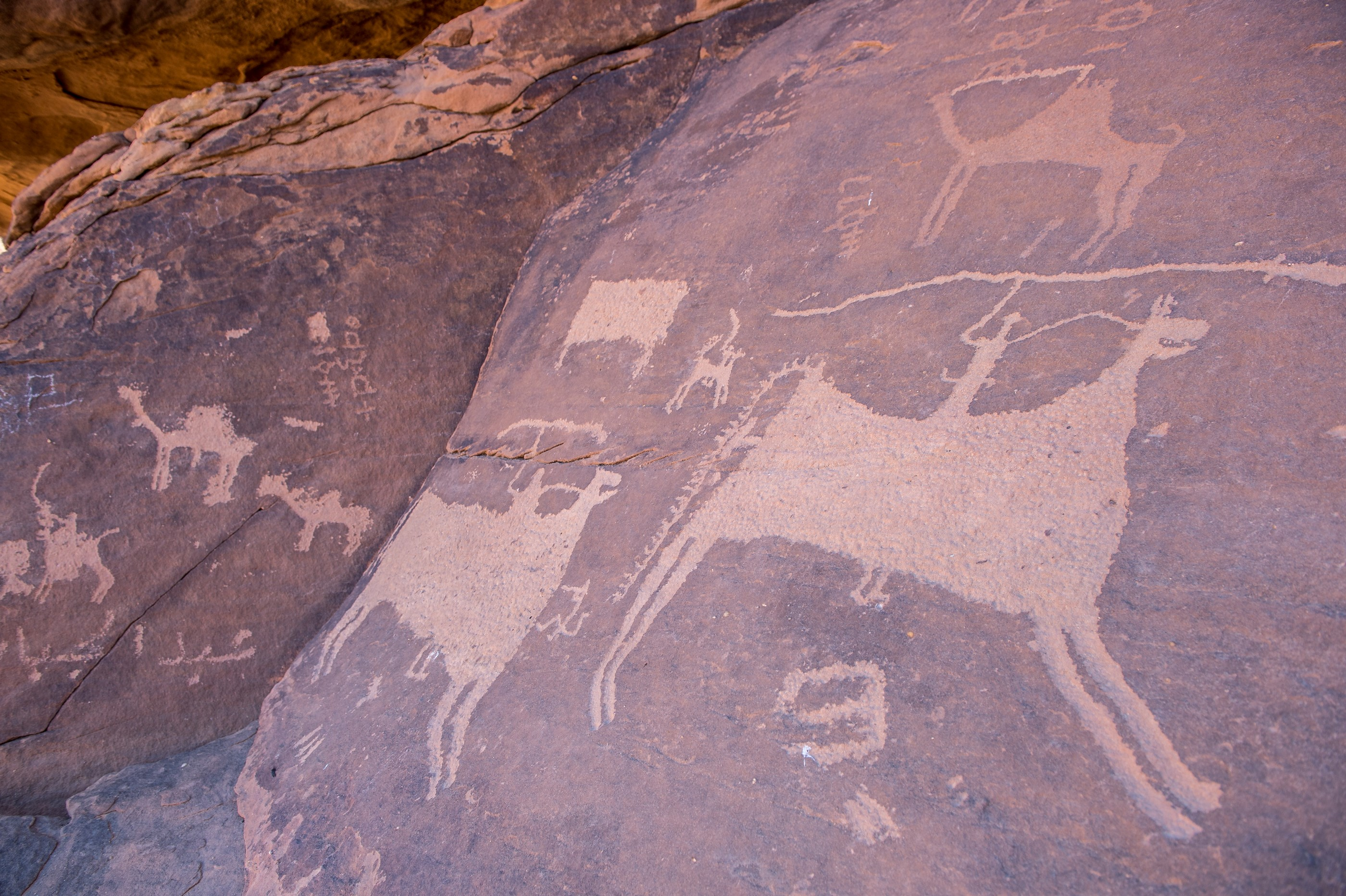

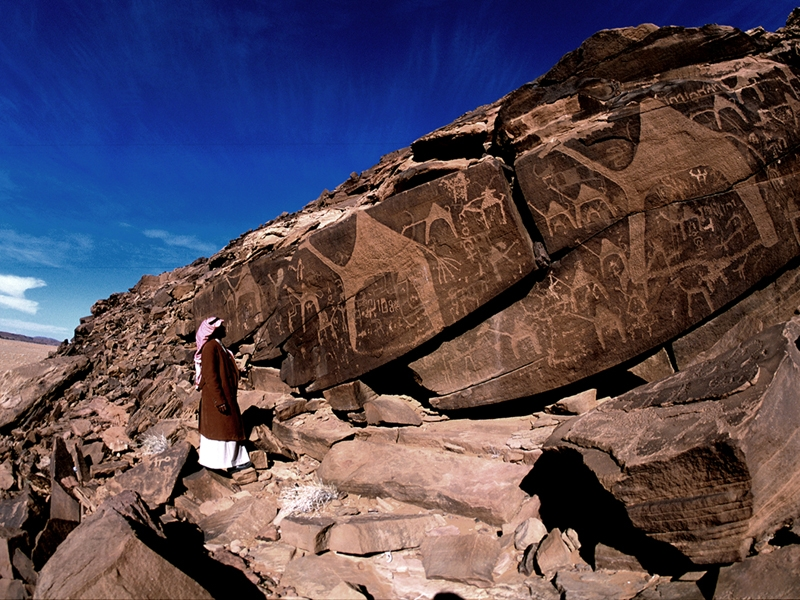
