= Hail Province, Saudi Arabia =

Province of Saudi Arabia

Hail Province منطقة حائل
- Province
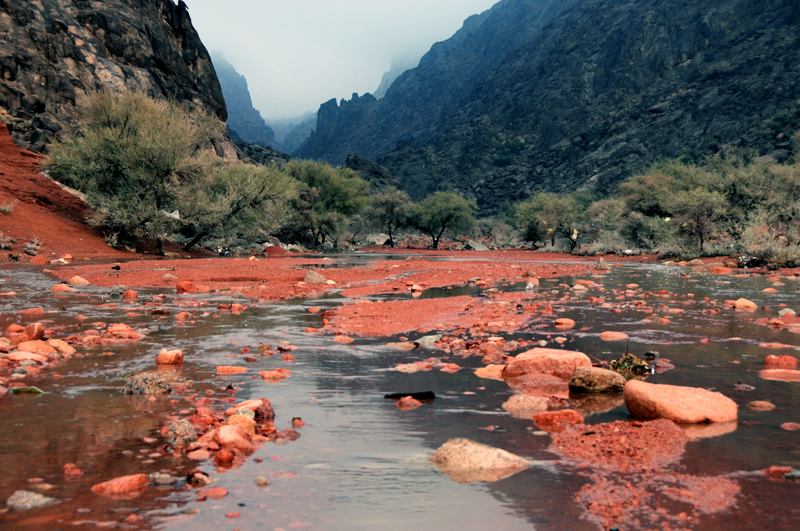
- Aja landscape in the Shammar Mountains
- Nickname: The Bride Of The North
- Map of Saudi Arabia with Hail Province highlighted
- Country: Saudi Arabia
- Region: Najd
- Seat: Hail
- Governorates: 8

Government
  - Type: Development Authority / Municipality
  - Body: Hail Development Authority (Upper body); Hail Municipality (Lower body)
  - Governor: Abdulaziz bin Saad
  - Deputy Governor: Faisal bin Fahd

Area
  - Total: 103,887 km^{2} (40,111 sq mi)
- Highest elevation (Mount Aja): 1,550 m (5,090 ft)

Population (2022 census)
  - Total: 746,406
  - Density: 7.18479/km^{2} (18.6085/sq mi)
- Demonym(s): Haili (Male); Hailiyah (Female)
- Time zone: UTC+03:00 (SAST)
- Area code: 016
- ISO 3166 code: SA–06
- Website: amanathail.gov.sa

Hail Province (Note: also known as the Hail Region (official English spelling: Hail; pronounced in Arabic: Ḥāʾil, منطقة حائل)) is a province in Saudi Arabia, located in the north-central part of the country in the Najd region. It is named after its seat, Hail, and is known for the twin mountain ranges of Aja and Salma, as well as for being the homeland of the historic symbol of generosity and curiosity, Hatim al-Tai.

== History ==
=== Prehistory ===
Archaeological evidence indicates the continuation of human settlement in Hail Province since prehistoric times. The sites dating to the Middle Paleolithic age discovered in and around Hail attest that the soil in the area could have held enough water to enable plant life during the period from 75000 BC to 5000 BC. A striking discovery in the province was that there are more archaeological sites dating back to the Paleolithic period than to the Neolithic. One reason given for this is that the climatic changes from a cold and humid climate in the Paleolithic period to the heat and drought of the Neolithic period and the resulting gradual change in vegetation cover from greenery to desertification led to mass migration to more habitable areas in the Fertile Crescent. Archaeologists have deduced that the availability of its water, the fertility of the soil, the abundance and distribution of pastures in different directions, and the moderate climate of the region, combined, made it a lot more hospitable than the surrounding Arabian Desert.

Neolithic sites are clearly scattered across the northern Arabian Peninsula. Several Neolithic artifacts found in the province date back to the period from 10000 BC to 7500 BC. The artifacts discovered in Hail can be distinguished from others found in Saudi Arabia by the abundance of rock drawings that vary between human and animal figures. The Neolithic period in Hail is distinguished by its different environments and diversity, as can be seen in the sandy banks of the valleys, the dune slopes and ancient lake deposits, including those discovered in Jubbah, northwest of Hail. Stone tools in separate areas of Hail also indicate that the people living in the area lived a life of hunting-gathering, rather than in permanent settlements.

Cultural evidence from the Copper Age (approximately 5500 BC) is most widespread within the Hail Province, and among the artifacts found in the area from this age are stone tools with flat sides in the form of scrapers, drills and cleavers. In addition to the discovery of a group of stone formations and circles that characterize the Copper Age, these stone installations indicate that life in this era was more settled than the life of hunting-gathering, which is a striking characteristic of a Neolithic society. Among the signs that prove these settlements are the presence of flint tools, vessels made of rough, unpolished clay and a group of rock inscriptions that together confirm the existence of human activity in the region in prehistoric times.

In May 2021, archaeologists announced that a 350,000-year-old Acheulean site named An Nasim in Ha'il could be the oldest human habitation site in northern Saudi Arabia. The site was first discovered in 2015 using remote sensing and palaeohydrological modelling. It contains paleolake deposits related with Middle Pleistocene materials. 354 artefacts, hand axes and stone tools, flakes discovered by researchers provided information about tool-making traditions of the earliest living man inhabited South-West Asia. Besides, Paleolithic artefacts are similar to material remains uncovered at the Acheulean sites in the Nafud desert.

=== Up to and after the advent of Islam ===
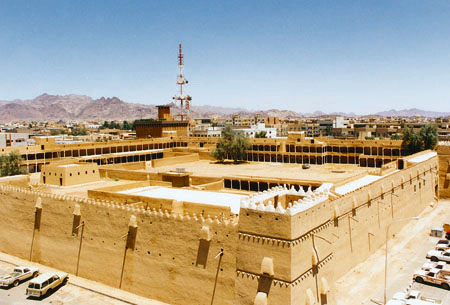
Qishlah palace in Hail

Part of the historic Najd region was inhabited by Arab tribes and influenced by the Nabataean people and later, the Ghassanids and Lakhmids. This is supported by the discovery of 122 Thamudian texts dating back to the eighth and seventh centuries BC in the city of Jubbah, approximately 100 km (62 mi) north of Hail City, which is the fourth archaeological site in the Kingdom to be put on the UNESCO World Cultural Heritage Site List, in 2002.

By 633, under the rule of Abu Bakr, the Rashidun Caliphate consolidated the region. The Shammar tribe emerged as the most powerful force in the area in later centuries, and by 1791, Prince Abdullah bin Ali Al-Rasheed of the Shammar consolidated the region under his rule. His state acted as a precursor to the Emirate of Jabal Shammar, which was formally established in 1834 by the Rashidi dynasty.

From 1836 to 1848, the Emirate functioned as a nominal vassal of the Second Saudi state, after which it reasserted itself as a sovereign kingdom until 1921. During this period, the Emirate of Jabal Shammar fought several wars against the expanding Saudi state to the south, often with the support of the Ottomans. In 1921, Ibn Saud of the House of Saud captured its capital, Hail City, during the Unification of Saudi Arabia, and the region fully fell under Saudi control by 1922.

== Geography and Cultural Heritage ==
The province is well known for its geographically and historically significant mountain ranges, the Aja and Salma Mountains, which now form part of the Jabal Aja Protected Area managed by the Saudi National Center for Wildlife. The province also hosts multiple notable rock art sites, two of which have been recognized by inclusion on the UNESCO World Cultural Heritage Site List: Jabal Umm Sinman near Jubbah and Jabal al-Manjur.

In addition to these archaeological treasures, the province contains numerous historic forts and castles, especially concentrated in and around the seat city, Hail City. The province is also notable for its unique sandstone formations, including the Nafud al-Kabir formation, which contribute to the distinctive natural landscape.

== Population ==
Historical population
Year	Pop.	±% p.a.
1992	411,284	—
2004	526,882	+2.09%
2010	605,930	+2.36%
2017	699,774	+2.08%
2022	746,406	+1.30%

== Governorates ==
Map of Hail Province

Hail Province comprises eight governorates, with Hail City serving as the provincial seat. The governorates are categorized into Category A and Category B based on the availability of services.

Seat
Governorate (A)
Governorate (B)

#	Governorate	2010 Census	2022 Census
–	Hail City	417,869	498,575
1	Hait	58,123	74,596
2	Baqaa	40,211	56,362
3	Shanan	44,344	29,419
4	Shamli	19,059	20,946
5	Sumairah	17,874	19,563
6	Sulaimi	26,231	17,343
7	Mawqaq	21,173	16,835
8	Ghazalah	103,506	12,767

== Transportation ==
=== Air ===
Hail International Airport serves as the main airport for the province, providing both domestic and limited international flights.

=== Rail ===
Hail is served by the Hail railway station, which is part of the Riyadh–Qurayyat railway operated by Saudi Arabia Railways. The station was opened in 2017 and connects Hail with Riyadh, Majmaah, Al-Qassim, Al-Jouf, and Qurayyat.

== Provincial government ==
The province is governed by a governor (Emir) appointed by the King of Saudi Arabia, assisted by a deputy governor.

Governor	Term of Office	Monarch(s)
Office established
Ibrahim Al-Sabhan	1921 – 1923	Abdulaziz
Abdulaziz bin Musaed	1923 – 1970	Abdulaziz, Saud, Faisal
Fahd bin Saad	1971 – 1972	Faisal
Saad bin Fahd	1972 – 1973	Faisal
Nasser bin Abdullah	1974 – 1980	Faisal, Khalid
Muqrin bin Abdulaziz	1980 – 1999	Khalid, Fahd
Saud bin Abdulmohsen	1999 – 2017	Fahd, Abdullah, Salman
Abdulaziz bin Saad	2017 – present	Salman

== See also ==
- Provinces of Saudi Arabia
- List of governorates of Saudi Arabia
- List of cities and towns in Saudi Arabia
