= Shammar Mountains =

Mountain range in Saudi Arabia

Coordinates: 27.5°N 41.6°E

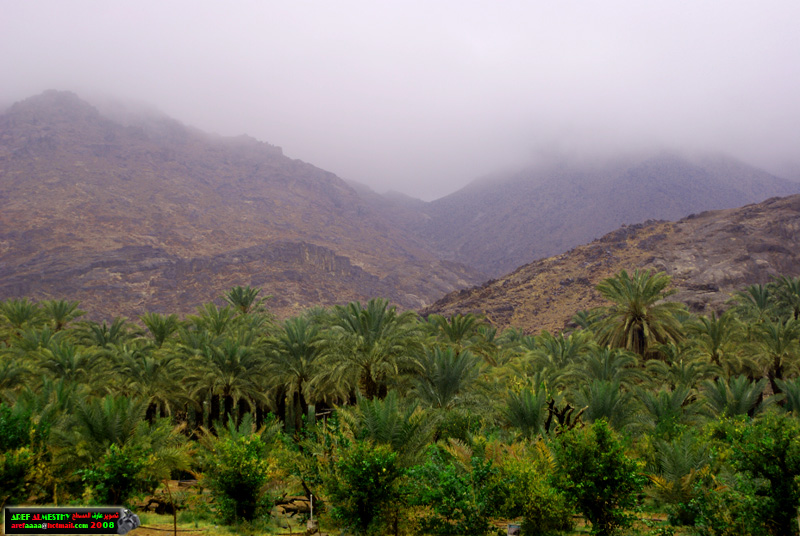
- The area of 'Uqdah on the outskirts of Ha'il

Highest point
- Elevation: 1,350 m (4,430 ft)

Naming
- Native name: جِبَال شَمَّر (Arabic)

Geography
- Location within Saudi Arabia Location within Middle East Location within Asia
- Country: Saudi Arabia
- Region: Ha'il

The Shammar Mountains (Arabic: جِبَال شَمَّر, romanized: Jibāl Shammar) is a mountain range in the northwestern Saudi Arabian province of Ha'il. It includes the Ajā (أَجَا) and Salma subranges.

== Geology ==
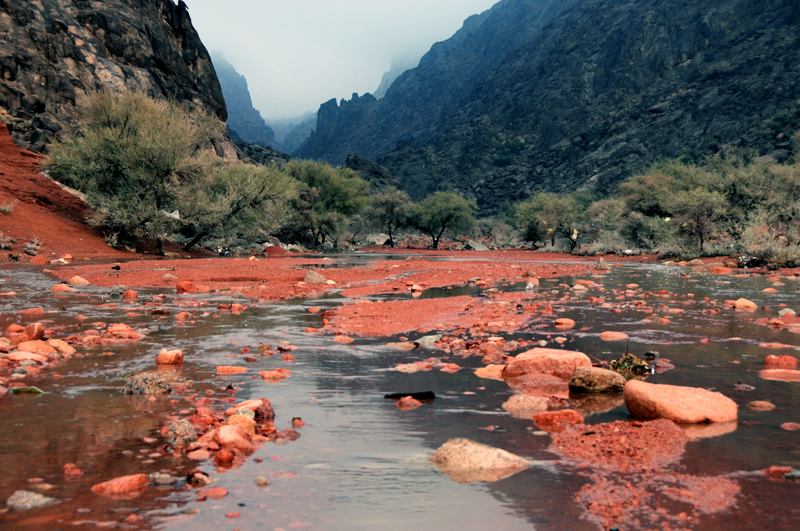
Aja landscape

The Aja Mountains are to an extent made up of granite, whereas the Salma are made up of basalt. The phrase "Hadn formation" was used by Chevremont (1982) to refer to volcanic rocks of the area of Ha'il, and was treated by Hadley and Schmidt (1980) as being part of a silicic and volcaniclastic sequence referred to as the "Shammar group", in a broader, regional context.

== Wildlife ==
The protected area of Jabal Aja is of ecological significance. Two Asiatic cheetahs, the last known in the country, were killed near Ha'il in 1973, and their skins kept near the Imara Palace for a few days.

== Peaks ==
- Mount Aja (Arabic: جَبَل أَجَا, romanized: Jabal Ajā)
- Mount Samra' (Arabic: جَبَل ٱلسَّمْرَاء, romanized: Jabal As-Samrā’)

== Gallery ==
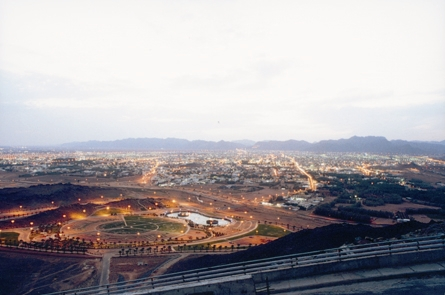
A view of Ha'il City from the top of Samra Mountain

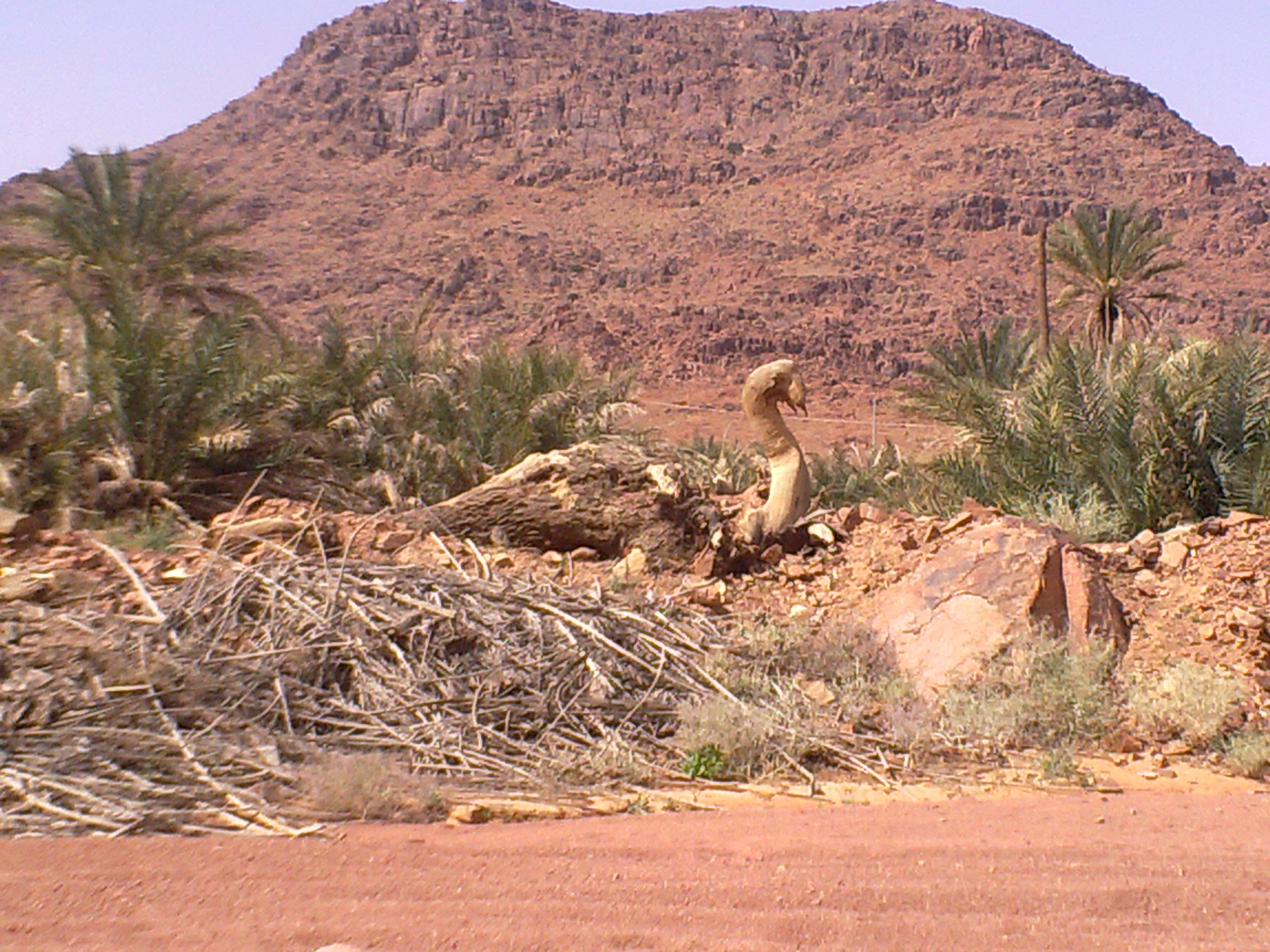
Natural bird shape

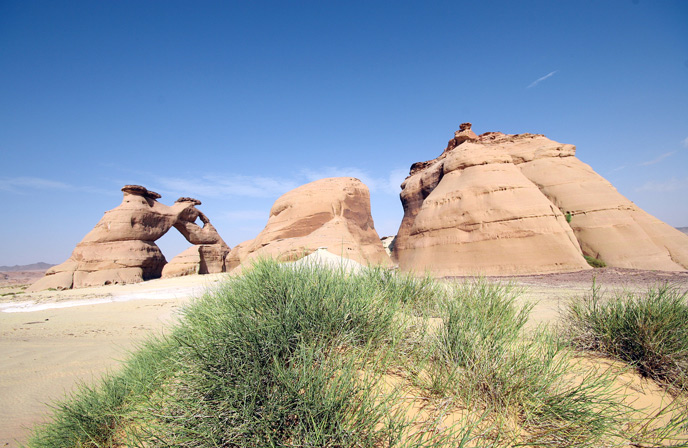
Mahajah rock formation

== See also ==
- Adayra Valley
- Emirate of Jabal Shammar
- Ghor es-Safi
- List of mountains in Saudi Arabia
- People:
  - Al Fadl
  - Jarrahids
  - Shammar
  - Tayy'
