= Adayra Valley =

Valley in Saudi Arabia

Adayra Valley (Arabic: وَادِي ٱلْأَدَيْرَع, romanized: Wādī al-Adayraʿ) runs roughly from north to south, and divides the northern Saudi Arabian city of Ha'il into eastern and western halves. It starts as a branch of Rimmah Valley in the south, and drains into Qa'a Al-Milh in the town of Baq'a.

== See also ==
- Shammar Mountains
  - Salma Mountains
- Wadi
- Wildlife of Saudi Arabia
