= Salma Mountains =

Mountain range in Saudi Arabia

The Salma Mountains (Arabic: جِبَال سَلْمَى, romanized: Jibāl Salmā) is a mountain range in Ha'il Province, Saudi Arabia. Like the Ajā, this range is part of the Shammar range.

== See also ==
- Adayra Valley
- Ha'il
- Mawqaq
- List of mountains in Saudi Arabia
- People:
  - Al Fadl
  - Jarrahids
  - Tayy'
