= Silicic =

Adjective to describe magma or igneous rock rich in silica

Silicic refers to the uncoloured igneous rocks to the right in this TAS classification (Na_{2}O + K_{2}O) versus silica (SiO_{2})

In this top of a QAPF diagram for classification of plutonic rocks, silicic rocks are uncoloured at the top of the figure (Q is for Quartz which is pure silica)

Silicic is an adjective to describe magma or igneous rock rich in silica (SiO_{2}). The amount of silica that constitutes a silicic rock is usually defined as at least 63 percent. Granite and rhyolite are the most common silicic rocks.

Silicic is the group of silicate magmas which will eventually crystallise a relatively small proportion of ferromagnesian silicates, such as amphibole, pyroxene, and biotite. The main constituents of a silicic rock will be minerals rich in silica-minerals, like silicic feldspar or even free silica as quartz. These are just part of all the other silicate minerals that make up 90% of the earth's crust.

This broad classification is refined in practice based on more detained compositional studies where ever possible in the science of mineralology.

== Example ==
The "Shammar group" is a silicic and volcaniclastic sequence in northwestern Saudi Arabia.

== See also ==
- Felsic
- Mafic
