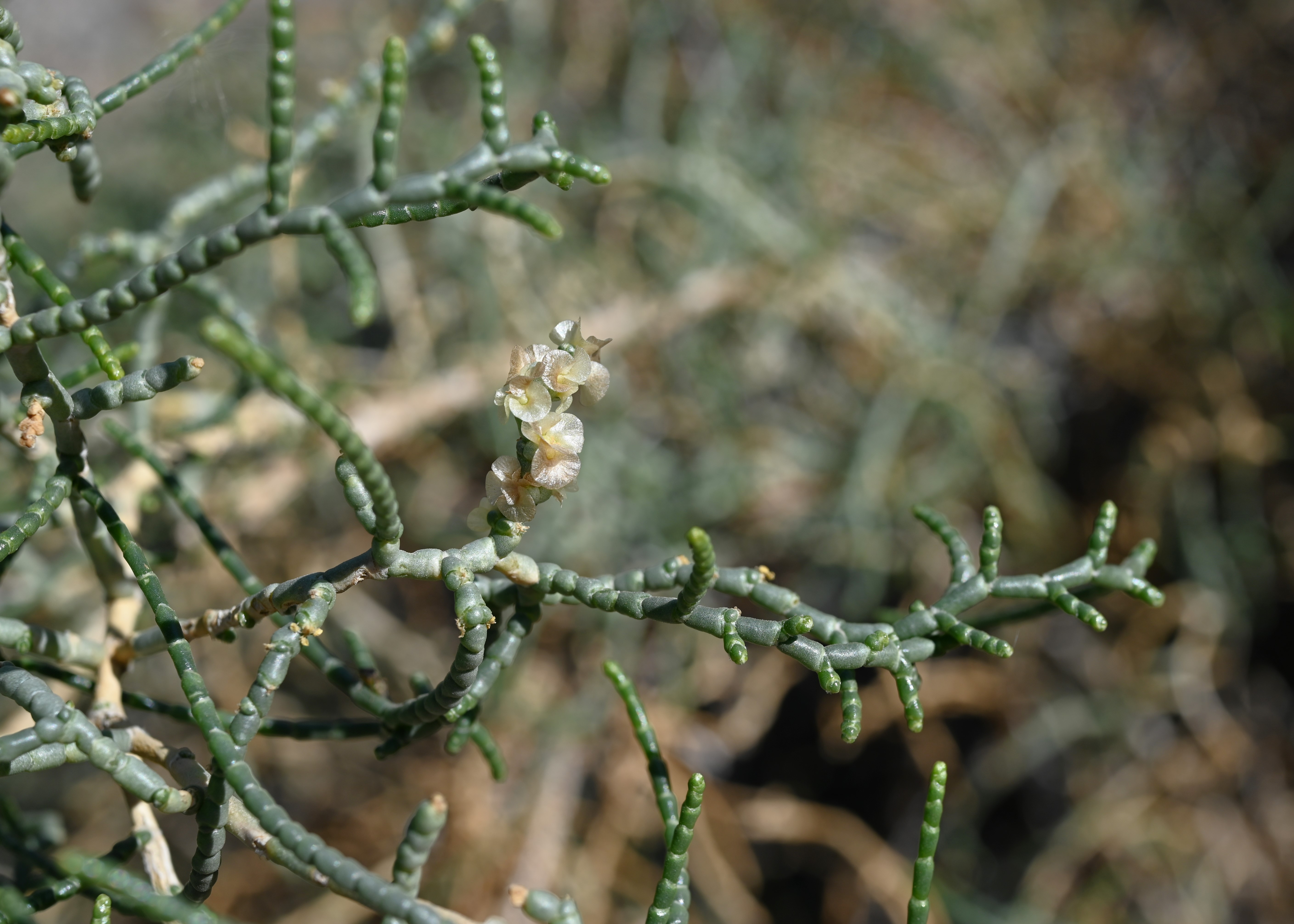

Scientific classification
- Kingdom: Plantae
- Clade: Embryophytes
- Clade: Tracheophytes
- Clade: Spermatophytes
- Clade: Angiosperms
- Clade: Eudicots
- Order: Caryophyllales
- Family: Amaranthaceae
- Genus: Haloxylon
- Species: H. salicornicum

Binomial name
- Haloxylon salicornicum (Moq.) Bunge ex Boiss.

Synonyms
- Arthrophytum articulatum (Moq.) Iljin; Caroxylon articulatum Moq. Caroxylon salicornicum Moq. Haloxylon articulatum (Moq.) Bunge; Haloxylon schweinfurthii Asch. & Schweinf. Hammada articulata (Moq.) O.Bolòs & Vigo; Hammada elegans (Bunge) Botsch. Hammada hispanica Botsch. Hammada salicornica (Moq.) Iljin; Salsola articulata Cav.

= Haloxylon salicornicum =

Species of plant

Haloxylon salicornicum is a salt tolerant, drought tolerant, desert shrub belonging to the family Amaranthaceae. It is a desert shrub and is found in Palestine, Syria, Jordan, Egypt, Saudi Arabia, Kuwait, Oman, United Arab Emirates, Afghanistan and Pakistan.

== Description ==
Haloxylon salicornicum is an almost leafless, much-branched shrub, growing up to 60 cm (20 in) in height. The stems are pale and the plant lacks large foliage-type leaves, having instead minute triangular cup-shaped scales with membranous margins and woolly interiors. The flowers are in short spikes up to 6 cm (2 in) long. This plant is found in sandhills, sand ridges and other arid habitats.
