= Nafud desert =

Desert in northern Saudi Arabia

- Desert
- Interactive map of Nafud desert
- Location: Saudi Arabia

The Nafud desert, or simply the Nafud (Arabic: صحراء النفود, romanized: ṣaḥrā' an-nafūd), is a desert in the northern part of the Arabian Peninsula at 28.30°N 41.00°E, occupying a great oval depression. It is 290 kilometres (180 mi) long and 225 kilometres (140 mi) wide, with an area of 65,000 square kilometres (25,000 sq mi).

The Nafud is an erg, a desert region located in north-central Saudi Arabia. It is noted for its sudden violent winds, which account for the large crescent-shaped dunes. The sand in the Nafud is a brick-reddish color. Rain comes once or twice per year. In some lowland areas, namely those near the Hejaz Mountains, there are oases where dates, vegetables, barley, and fruits are grown. The Nafud is connected to the Rub' al Khali by the Dahna, a corridor of gravel plains and sand dunes, 800 mi (1,287 km) long and 15 to 50 miles (24.1 to 80.5 km) wide.

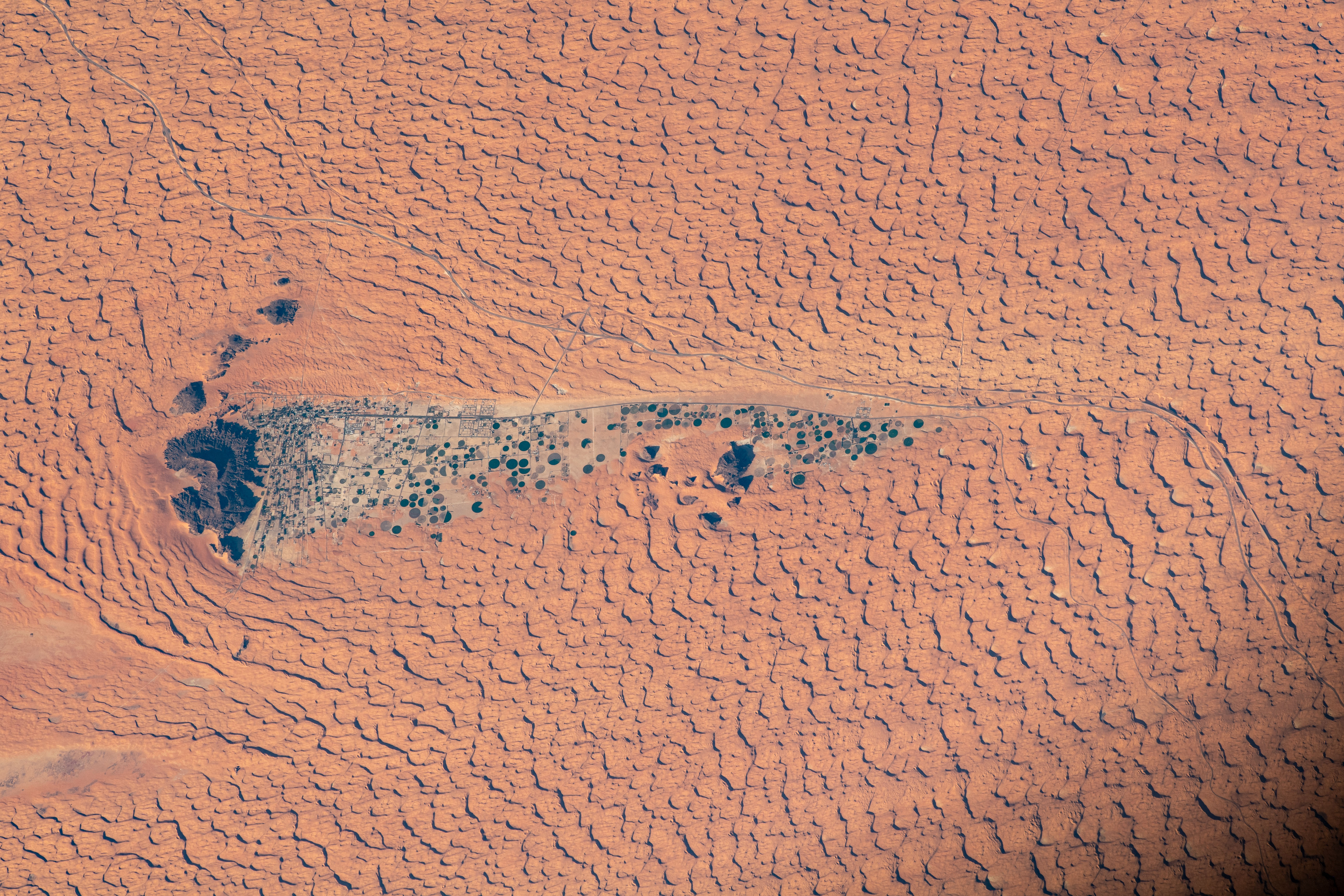
Satellite image of the Nafud desert with the Jubbah oasis.

During the Arab Revolt in 1917, forces led by Auda ibu Tayi attacked the Turkish-held coastal town of Aqaba on its poorly defended eastern flank. The approach was via a long and wide desert route, passing close to the edge of the Nafud. Colonel T. E. Lawrence asked Auda ibu Tayi to allow their group to stray from their course into the Nafud. Auda refused because it was unnecessary. Their harsh transit did not include entering the Nafud, as is depicted in the film Lawrence of Arabia.

The discovery of an 85,000-year-old fossilised human finger in An Nafud in 2016 by Dr Mathieu Duval of Griffith University provided the earliest evidence of modern humans outside Africa and the Levant.

This desert was thought to be relatively inhabited between the Last Glacial Maximum and the end of Pleistocene. Recent findings in northern Saudi Arabia, including Jebel Misma and Jebel Arnaan, of camel engravings points towards seasonal human presence in this area and biological and cultural exchanges with Levantine groups between 12,800 and 11,400 years ago.

== Formation ==
These are sand dunes located between rocky areas called plateaus, and their sand is characterized by its red color.

== A Description of the Great Nefud Desert ==
As for the Nafud—a name previously unknown to the Arabs—it is a vast desert characterized by white or red sands. These sands are driven by the winds, forming towering dunes and undulating chains of sand ridges. The region begins at the city of Tayma and extends approximately 450 kilometers eastward. The Nafud is considered a region of distinct inclination or slope; measurements.
