= Al-Baha =

Al-Baha الباحة
- City
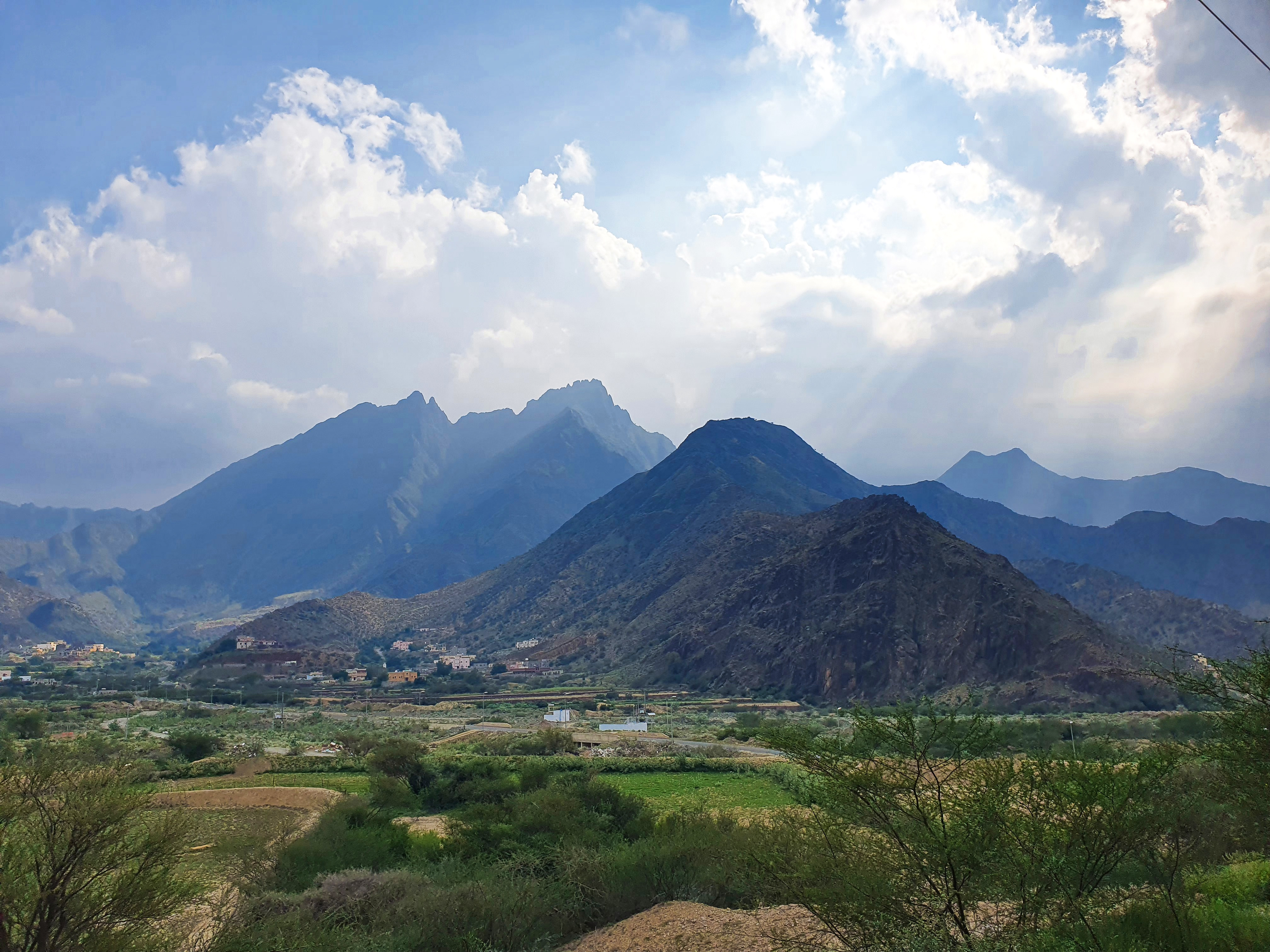
- Overview of Al-Baha with the Hejaz Mountains in the background
- Nicknames: Garden of the Hejaz
- Location in Saudi Arabia Al-Baha (Middle East) Al-Baha (Asia)
- Coordinates: 20°00′45″N 41°27′55″E
- Country: Saudi Arabia
- Province: Al-Baha
- Region: Hejaz

Government
  - Type: Municipality
  - Body: Al-Baha Municipality
- Elevation: 2,200 m (7,200 ft)

Population (2022 census)
  - City: 90,515
  - Metro: 339,174 (Province)
- Time zone: UTC+03:00 (SAST)
- Area code: 017

Al-Baha also spelled as Al-Bahah (Note: The spelling Al-Baha is the official form used in Saudi government publications and international references.) (Arabic: ٱلْبَاحَة, romanized: al-Bāḥa) is a city in the Hejaz region of Saudi Arabia, located in the Sarawat Mountains. It is the capital and administrative center of Al-Baha Province and is considered one of the country's notable tourist destinations.

== Geography ==
Al-Baha City lies in the south west of the kingdom of Saudi Arabia, between Mecca (which borders it from the north, west, and south west) and Asir (which borders it from the south-east). It is the smallest of the kingdom's provinces (11,000 square kilometres (1,100,000 ha)). It is surrounded by a number of cities, including Taif on the north, Beesha on the east, and Al-Qunfuda on coast of the Red Sea in the west. This tourist city is situated in an area characterized by natural tree cover and agricultural plateaus. It consists of six towns, the most important of which are Baljurashi, Al-Mandaq, and Al-Mikhwah, in addition to Al-Baha city in the center of the province. The province comprises 31 administrative centres, and it has a population of 339,174 (2022).

The province is known for its beauty and has forests, wildlife areas, valleys and mountains that attract visitors from all parts of the kingdom and the Persian Gulf area. Some of these areas are the forests of Raghdan, Ghomsan, Fayk, and Aljabal, and many other historical and archaeological sites. It contains more than 53 forests.

Al-Baha is the homeland of the Ghamid and Zahran tribes and is divided geographically into three distinct parts: Sarah, which contains the high Hejaz Mountains characterized by temperate weather and rich plant cover due to relatively high annual rainfall, the Tihamah which is the lowland coastal area to the west of the Hejaz, characterized by very hot and humid weather and very little rainfall average, and the eastern hills characterized by an altitude of 1,550 to 1,900 metres (5,090 to 6,230 feet) above sea level with cool winters, hot summers and sparse plant cover. The largest city in the province, both in population and area, is Baljurashi, the second one is Al-Mandaq. In Tehama, there are two major cities: Qilwah and Al-Mikhwah. The number of tribes are 18, branching from the main ones, Ghamid and Zahran. The province has 13 settled tribes (working in trades and agriculture) and five nomadic tribes.

=== Climate ===
Al Bahah has a cool steppe climate (Köppen:BSh). The climate is greatly affected by its varying geographic features. Generally speaking, the climate in Al-Baha is mild with temperatures ranging between 7 and 32.3 °C (44.6 and 90.1 °F). Due to its location at 1,700–2,200 metres (5,600–7,200 ft) above sea level, Al Baha's climate is hot in summer and cool in winter. The area attracts visitors looking for a moderate climate and pristine, scenic views.

In the Tehama area of the province, which is down on the coast, the climate is hot in the summer and warm in the winter. Humidity ranges from 52%–67%. While in the mountainous region, which is known as As-Sarah, the weather is cooler in summer and winter. Rainfall in the mountainous region lies in the range of 229 to 581 millimetres (9 to 23 in) with most moisture coming in winter through fog,and most precipitation falling the cool season of spring, august also has a notable amount of precipitation largely from the heavily weakened Indian Ocean monsoon in the region due to albahas latitude and most of the monsoon only reaching as far north as jazan. The average annual precipitation throughout the whole region is 100 to 250 millimetres (3.9 to 9.8 in) annually.

Climate data for Al Baha (1991–2020)
Month	Jan	Feb	Mar	Apr	May	Jun	Jul	Aug	Sep	Oct	Nov	Dec	Year
Record high °C (°F)	30.7 (87.3)	32.0 (89.6)	36.0 (96.8)	35.0 (95.0)	38.2 (100.8)	39.5 (103.1)	40.0 (104.0)	39.0 (102.2)	38.0 (100.4)	35.0 (95.0)	37.0 (98.6)	29.6 (85.3)	40.0 (104.0)
Mean daily maximum °C (°F)	18.0 (64.4)	22.1 (71.8)	25.0 (77.0)	29.7 (85.5)	33.0 (91.4)	35.5 (95.9)	35.5 (95.9)	35.6 (96.1)	33.8 (92.8)	29.7 (85.5)	26.0 (78.8)	23.8 (74.8)	29.0 (84.2)
Daily mean °C (°F)	12.0 (53.6)	16.0 (60.8)	18.0 (64.4)	22.8 (73.0)	26.0 (78.8)	29.1 (84.4)	29.1 (84.4)	29.1 (84.4)	27.7 (81.9)	23.2 (73.8)	16.5 (61.7)	13.0 (55.4)	21.9 (71.4)
Mean daily minimum °C (°F)	7 (45)	10.5 (50.9)	13.2 (55.8)	17.0 (62.6)	20.1 (68.2)	22.8 (73.0)	23.1 (73.6)	23.1 (73.6)	21.5 (70.7)	16.9 (62.4)	13.1 (55.6)	10.7 (51.3)	16.6 (61.9)
Record low °C (°F)	0.6 (33.1)	0.0 (32.0)	4.0 (39.2)	8.0 (46.4)	12.2 (54.0)	12.0 (53.6)	15.8 (60.4)	14.0 (57.2)	15.0 (59.0)	8.5 (47.3)	4.8 (40.6)	2.0 (35.6)	0.0 (32.0)
Average precipitation mm (inches)	10.4 (0.41)	5.8 (0.23)	20.4 (0.80)	45.5 (1.79)	39.9 (1.57)	3.0 (0.12)	2.8 (0.11)	9.1 (0.36)	1.5 (0.06)	13.5 (0.53)	19.8 (0.78)	4.3 (0.17)	170.1 (6.70)
Average precipitation days (≥ 1.0 mm)	1.2	0.3	1.5	3.6	3.9	1.0	1.5	2.4	0.3	1.0	1.4	0.9	19.0
Average relative humidity (%)	55	48	46	45	35	25	27	28	25	30	46	53	39
Source 1: World Meteorological Organization Jeddah Regional Climate Center
Source 2: Meteomanz (extremes since 2021)

== History ==
Post-World War 1, the village of El-Zafir (Arabic: قَرْيَة ٱلظَّفِيْر, romanized: Qaryat aẓ-Ẓafīr) had been the administrative centre of what was known then as Belad Ghamd, but with the establishment of Saudi Arabian government, the Ghamd and Zahran were administered as a unit in 1925, and the seat of local government transferred to Baljurashi), a town situated 15 miles (24 kilometres) south of El-Zafir. The tribes of Ghamid and Zahran are the indigenous people of Al Baha. Tribes in the region trace their origin to the ancient Arabian Mamlakat Saba' (possibly the Kingdom of Sheba), whose rule extended to areas presently known as Syria and Lebanon. Historians also report that they established the famous state of Axum, in Abyssinia. Prince Husam bin Saud has been the governor of the province since April 21, 2017.

The name "Pearl of Resorts" is the name given to Al-Baha by those acquainted with the city. The name "Garden of the Hejaz" (Arabic: حَدِيْقَة ٱلْحِجَاز, romanized: Ḥadīqat al-Ḥijāz) was the name given to it by the Sharif of Mecca.

== Historic attractions ==
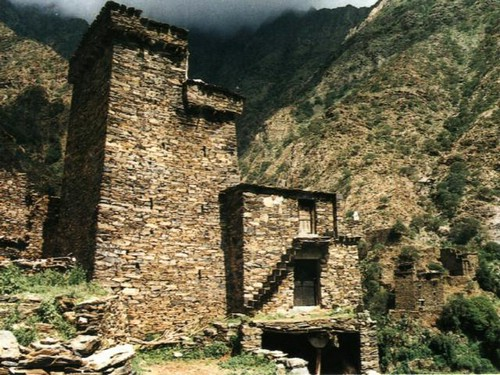
Old architecture in Al-Baha

Al Baha is also known for their traditional towers, each of which is called a qaṣbah (Arabic: قَصْبَة). It was said "Apparently unique to Albaha architecture are the qasaba towers. Controversy surrounds their function—some argue that they were built as lookouts, and others that they were keeps, or even granaries. Perhaps it is a combination, although the right position of a watchtower, on a hill top, is the wrong place for a keep or granary."

Thee Ain Village is situated at about 24 km (15 miles) southwest of Al-Baha, across 'Aqabat al-Baha, also known as Aqbat King Fahad. This known village sometimes known as "marble village" as it is built on a small marble mountain. The grove of palm trees is lush due to a small stream nearby. The villagers say that the marble village glows at sunset. It also has a steep escarpment road, running into and out of tunnels on the way up and down. Thee Ain was famous for its fruits and banana plantations which still grow there. The village dates back about 400 years, and it witnessed the battles between the Ottoman Turks and its inhabitants. The village was named after an ʿAyn (Arabic: عَيْن, water spring) continuously flowing from the nearby mountains to several reservoirs and each particular pond has its own name. There is a local legend that talks about a man lost his cane in one of the valleys, and to retrieve it he tracked it until he reached the village, he gathered its inhabitants and retrieved his cane after digging the spring:

Even the road that leads to the (Dhee Ayn) village is impressive, and several historical stone and slate towers dot the way. Al-Bahah Region is known as the region of 1001 towers, once built to protect villages, roads and plantations from rivalling tribes. Today, these towers are abandoned, and many of them are partially or completely in ruins.

— Atlas Obscura

== Infrastructure ==
=== Souq ===
The souq or traditional market in Al Baha has been studied to see how the market performs in maintaining order and social customs. "Weekly markets in Al-Baha, which is located in the south-western part of Saudi Arabia, was not only performing economic functions, but also, social functions. Those markets continued to perform these functions until around 1975 when the modern markets began to take over, and other social institutions like schools, mail, and mass media began to do the social functions of those weekly markets. This study is trying to explain the social functions of weekly markets in Al-Baha like uniting the tribes, using the market as a tool of punishment, entertainment, mail and religious education."

== Transportation ==
Al-Baha Province is served by King Saud Domestic Airport, located in Al-Aqiq, offering domestic flights only. For international travel, residents use nearby airports such as Abha International Airport, Taif International Airport, or King Abdulaziz International Airport in Jeddah.

== Hospitals and medical care ==
King Fahd Hospital (Arabic: مُسْتَشْفَى ٱلْمَلِك فَهْد, romanized: Mustashfā al-Malik Fahd): "Initially, the hospital has been operated by one of the International specialist companies in directing and operating hospitals, but since 1421 (2000) it was self operated under the supervision of MOH."

It is also a training hospital in the main health sciences, as stated in 2012: "King Fahad Hospital, Al-Baha is already accredited by the Saudi Commission for Health Specialties as training center for postgraduate programs of Saudi Board / Arab Board in the 4 main departments, namely: Pediatrics, General Surgery, Internal Medicine, and Obstetrics & Gynecology. These programs are completely accredited in the hospital and no need for the candidate to move into any other hospital for complete his training requirements. The Urology department is processing accreditation process that may be finalized by the next academic year."

As a training hospital, the Medical Library, established in 1982, in the King Fahd Hospital is one of the largest libraries in the Province: "Health Sciences Library and Information Center represents the core of the Academic Affairs services provided for all health care workers in Al-Baha region. it is located on the ground floor of the main hospital building in front of the human resources department and Employee Health Clinic. The library contains 1,250 hard copies of recent medical textbooks in all medical fields with plenty of full colour medical atlases, dictionaries, and other materials for learning the English language with a section for Arabic books and publications of interest for administrative staff. The digital library includes 800 digital books with audiovisual materials for teaching medical examination, heart and breath sounds and also materials for teaching the English language. This section includes digital version of video recordings for all scientific events carried out in the hospital. Also, digital archives are available for some of the most prestigious medical journals for the last few years."

- Qudran Private Hospital (Arabic: مُسْتَشْفَى غُدْرَان ٱلْخَاص, romanized: Mustashfā Ghudrān al-Khāṣ)
- Prince Mishari Bin Saud Hospital, Baljurashi (Arabic: مُسْتَشْفَى ٱلْاَمِيْر مِشَارِي بِن سُعُوْد بَلْجُرَشِي, romanized: Mustashfā Al-Amīr Mishārī bin Suʿūd Baljurashī)
- Al-Mandag General Hospital (Arabic: مُسْتَشْفَى ٱلْمَنْدَق ٱلْعَام, romanized: Mustashfā Al-Mandaq Al-ˁĀm)
- Shamekh Polyclinic (Arabic: مُسْتَوْصَف شَامِخ ٱلْأَهْلِي, romanized: Mustawṣaf Shāmikh Al-Ahlī)

== Traditional tribal cemeteries ==
The southern tribal hinterland of Baha — home to especially the Ghamdi and Zahrani tribes — has been renowned for centuries for their tribal cemeteries that are now slowly vanishing, according to Asharq Al-Awsat newspaper. One old villager explained how tribal cemeteries came about: "People used to die in large numbers and very rapidly one after the other because of diseases. So the villagers would dig graves close by burying members of the same family in one area. That was how the family and tribal burial grounds came about," he said. The old man continued, "If the family ran out of space, they would open old graves where family members had been buried before and add more people to them. This process is known as khashf." During famines and outbreaks of epidemics, huge numbers of people would die and many tribes faced difficulties in digging new graves because of the difficult weather. Elderly people remember that in olden times, the winter used to stretch for more than six months and would be accompanied by much rain and fog, making movement difficult. But due to tribal rivalries, many families would guard their cemeteries, and put restrictions on who got buried in them. Across Al-Bahah, burial grounds are constructed in different ways. Some cemeteries consist of underground vaults or concrete burial chambers with the capacity of holding a large number of bodies at a time. Such vaults include windows for people to peer through and are usually decorated ornately with writings, drawings and patterns. Muhammad Saleh, a local resident, said, "One of the things that is so iconic about many of these graves is the fact that many of them are not directed toward the Kaaba. This tells us that some of these graves are from the pre-Islamic era. In Islam the face of a dead person should be toward the Kaaba."

== Education ==
- Academic Affairs & Health Training established in 2006
- Al-Baha University established in 2006
- The Community College, which belongs to Umm Al Qura University of Makkah
- Dar Al-faisal International School
- Creativity Care

Al-Baha literary club is concerned with intellectual meetings, poems, novels and book distribution. It hosts intellectuals from all regions of Saudi Arabia. It was founded in 2009.

== Culture ==
=== Religion ===
All of the Saudi citizens of Al-Baha are Sunni Muslim, who in the past practiced Shafi`i, a school of fiqh that was dominant in the Hejaz. The largest mosque here is the King Fahd Mosque (Arabic: جَامِع ٱلْمَلِك فَهْد, romanized: Jāmiʿ Al-Malik Fahd).

=== Cuisine ===
The city is known for its healthy and nutritious traditional meals brought by local farming such as Daghābīs (دَغَابِيْس) and ʿAṣīdah (عَصِيْدَه).

The Province is famous for its production of honey, in addition to its agricultural production of vegetables, grain, fruit, and dates. The region also grows grapes, grapefruits, lemons, oranges, pomegranates and dates.

— Al Baha City Profile

== Language ==
It is claimed by some Arab authors that the dialect of Belad Ghamid and Zahran (Now known as Al Baha province in Saudi Arabia) is nearest to classical Arabic. Aḥmed ʿAbdul-Ghafūr ʿAṭṭār (أَحْمَد عَبْدُ ٱلْغَفُوْر عَطَّار) had said in an article that the dialect of the Hejaz, especially that which is spoken in Belad Ghamdi and Zahran. is close to the Classical Dialect. Faiṣal Ghorī (فَيْصَل غوْرِي), a known scholar of Arabic literature, wrote in his book Qabaʾil Al-Ḥijāz (قَبَائِل ٱلْحِجَاز) "The Quranic Arabic upon which our grammar is based on does not exist in any tribe. The only thing we can say is that there are some tribes whose language is much closer to classical language. The tribes of Belad Ghamid and Zahran are a good example of this."

=== Media ===
Al Baha is served by four major Arabic newspapers, Asharq Al-Awsat, Al Watan, Okaz, and Al Bilad, as well as two major English newspapers, the Saudi Gazette and Arab News. Okaz and Al Watan are the primary newspapers of Al Baha and some other Saudi cities. With over a million readers, they focus mainly on issues that affect the city.

Al Baha Today (e-version newspaper) is a daily electronic newspaper directed at locals, new residents, incoming visitors, tourists, and the developing tourism business sector. The magazine serves as a guide to the city's sights and attractions, restaurants, shopping, and entertainment. It can be accessed via Albahatoday. Television stations serving the city area include Saudi TV1, Saudi TV2, Saudi TV Sports, Al Ekhbariya, the ART channels network, and hundreds of cable, satellite, and other specialty television providers.

== Natural resources ==
The region is known for its ancient mining sites. Major gold mining areas were those of Khayāl al-Maṣnaʿ (Arabic: خَيَال ٱلْمَصْنَع) and Al-‘Aqīq (Arabic: ٱلْعَقِيْق). The village of Kuna has over one hundred building structures which date back to South Arabian Civilization.

== Wildlife ==
Visitors from inside the kingdom and nearby countries are particularly attracted to the area by its more than 53 forests, which include the Raghdan forest, which covers an area of 600,000 square metres (60 ha) just 5 kilometres (3.1 miles) from the city. It has been provided with children's playgrounds and other amenities. The Amdan forest is 55 km (34 miles) to the north of Al Baha. It abounds in olive trees, Ara'r shrubs and other natural vegetation. The Wadi Feig forest is 8 km (5.0 miles) from Al Baha. It is encircled by a green valley littered with apricot, pomegranate and grape orchards. The forest of Wadi Al Ageeg is 40 km (25 miles) from Al Baha and abounds in various fruit trees and tall lotus trees. Al Baha airport is in Ageeg city. Al Kharrara waterfall is 30 kilometers to the south of Al Baha. Its scenic view attracts a large numbers of visitors.

Shada Mountain (Arabic: جَبَل شَدَا, romanized: Jabal Shadā) is the highest summit in Makhwah. It features rare rocky formations that attract amateur climbers of various levels. The Arabian leopard is known to exist in the Asir Mountains between Al-Bahah and Abha. It is also present in the Hijaz Mountains to the north.

== Western travellers ==
St John Philby (also known as Sheikh Abdullah by King Abdulaziz) documented his journey crossing from Riyadh to Jeddah by the "backdoor" route, writing on Al Baha district of Arabia in his book The Arabian Highlands. Later he was awarded the Royal Geographical Society Founders Gold Medal for his written desert journey.

== Gallery ==
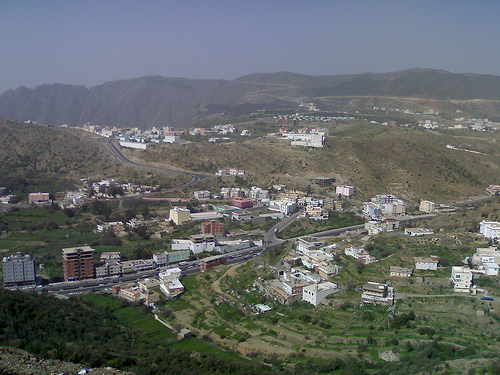

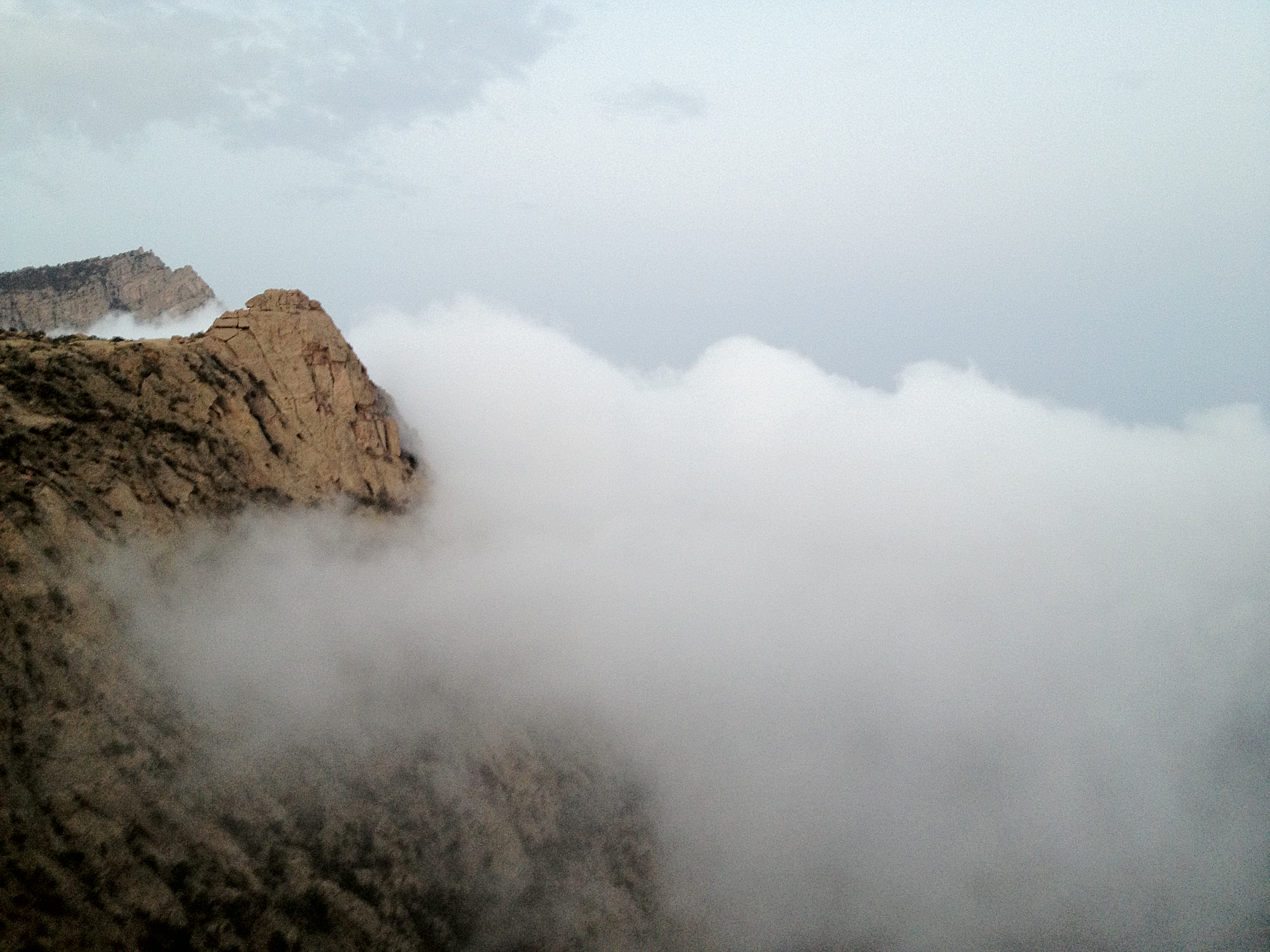

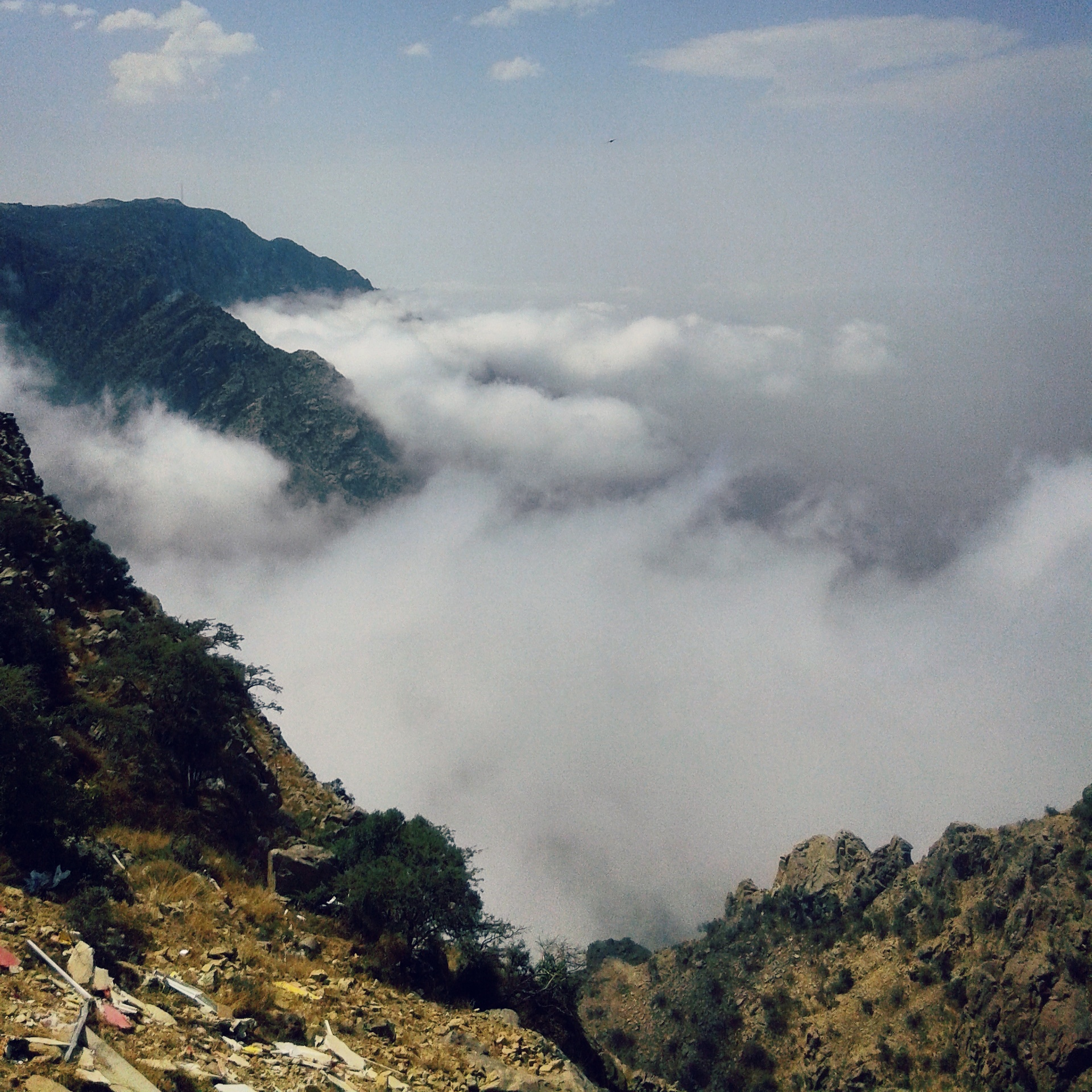

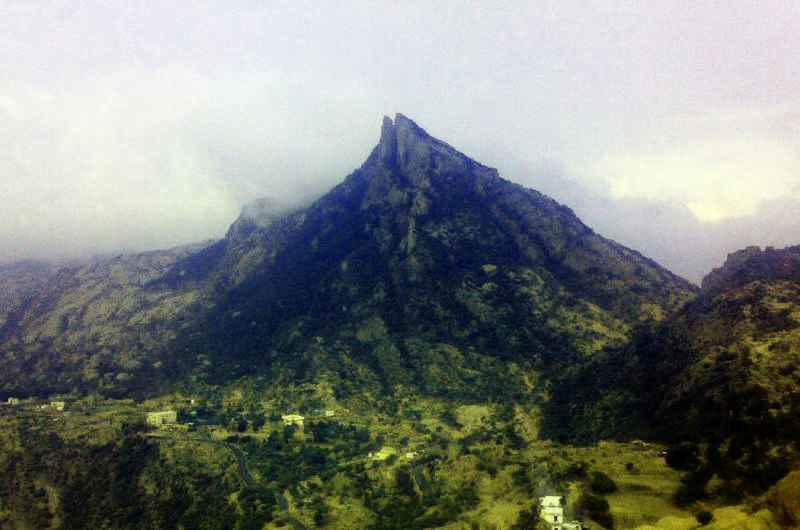

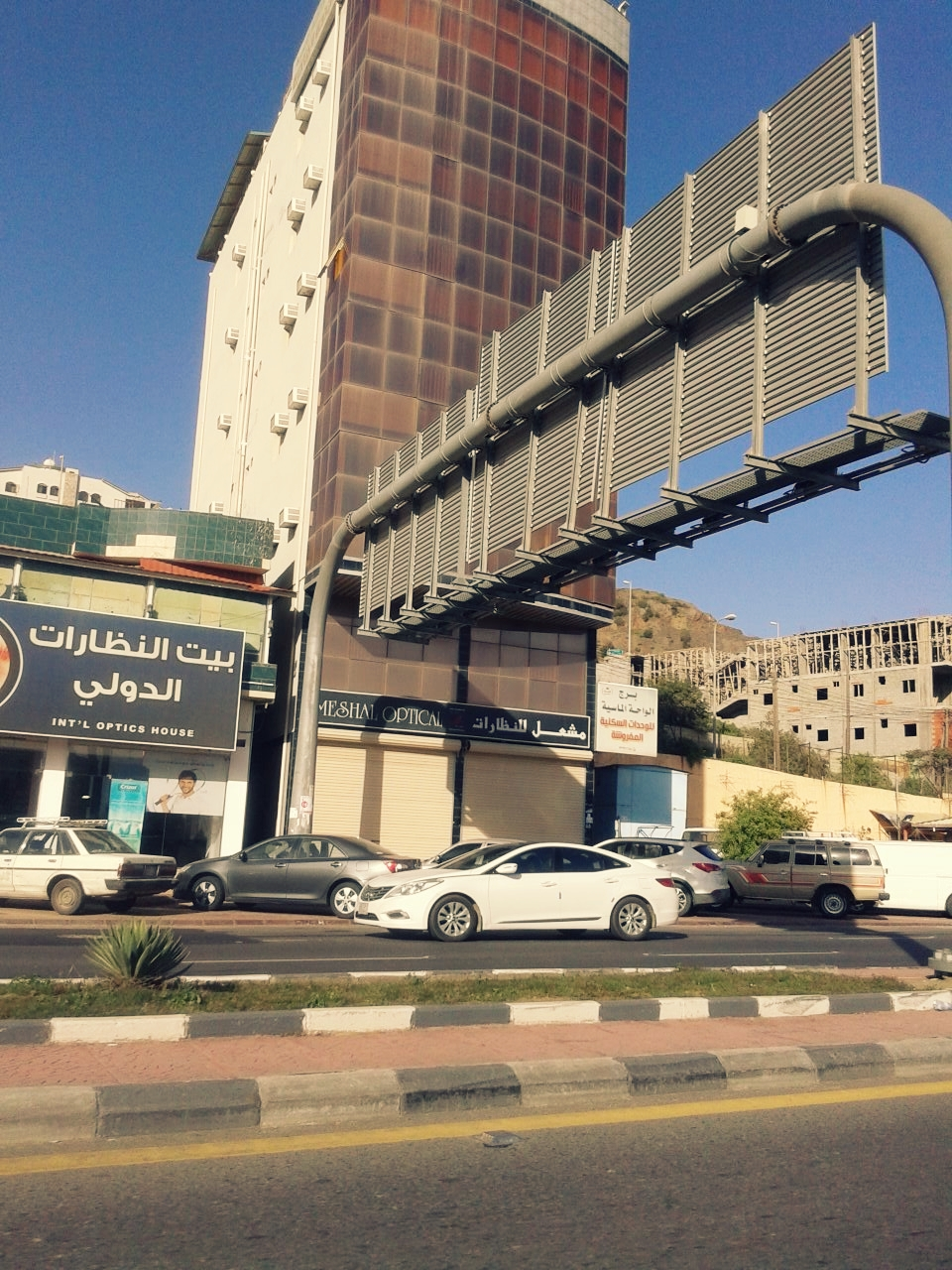

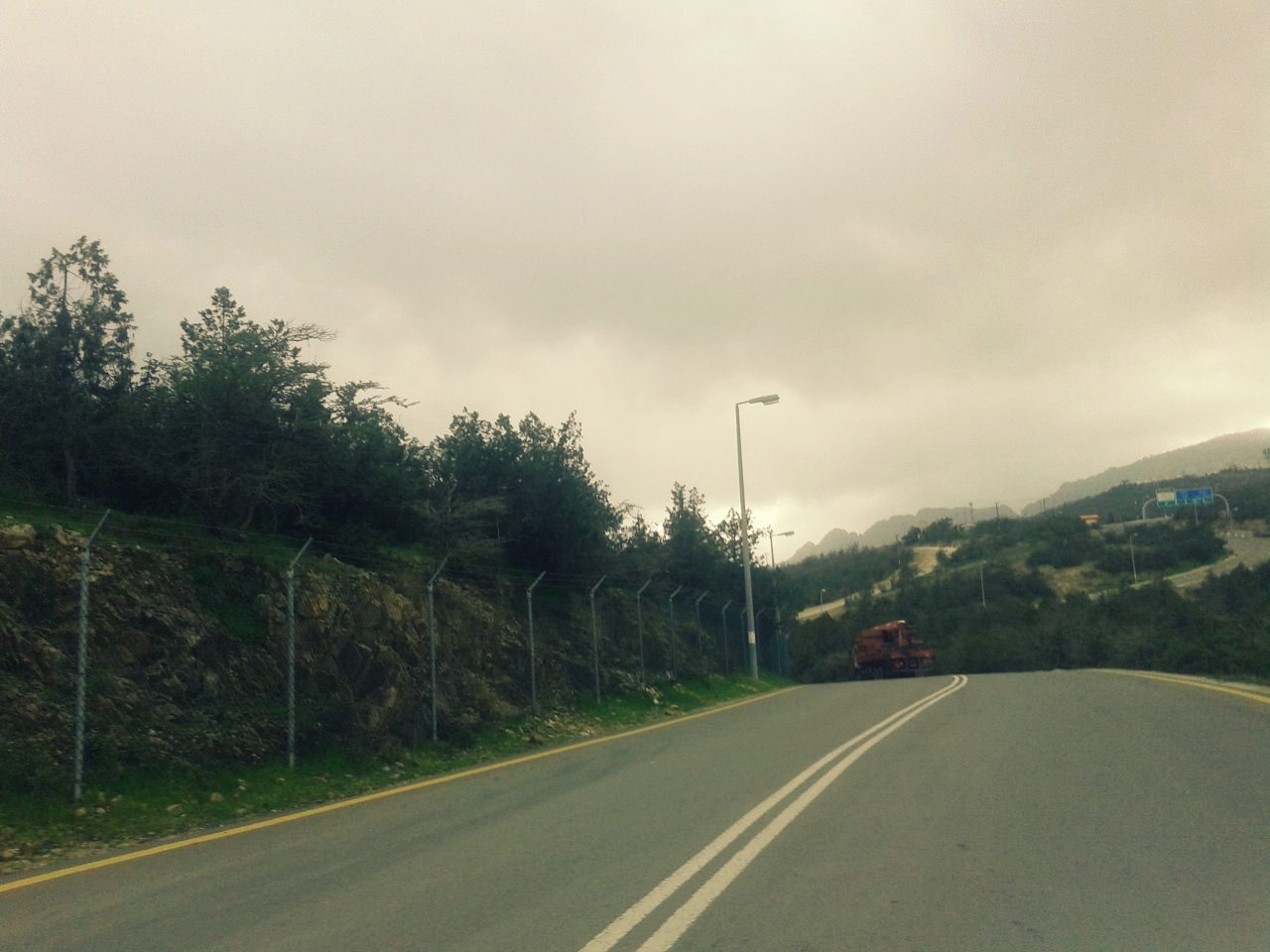

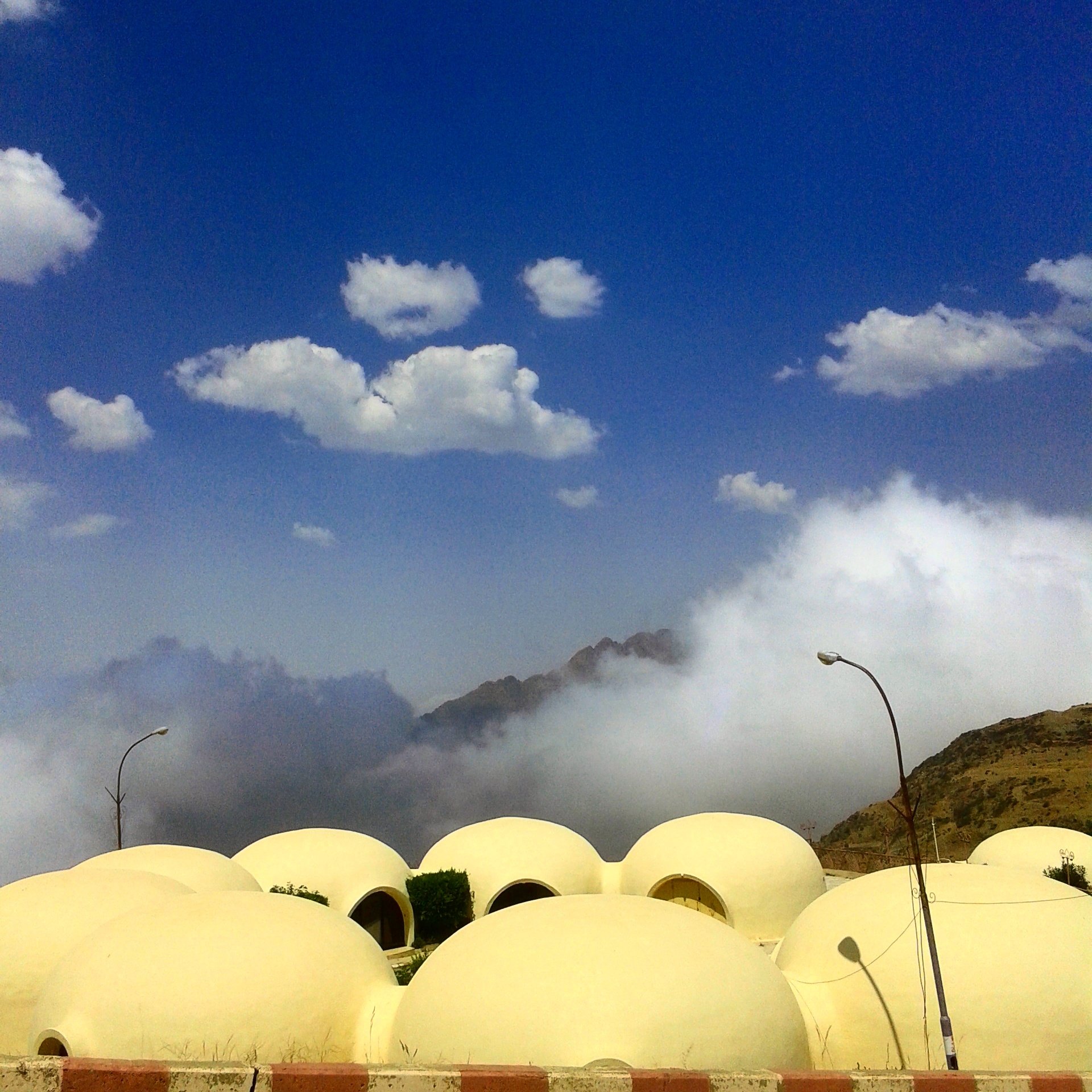

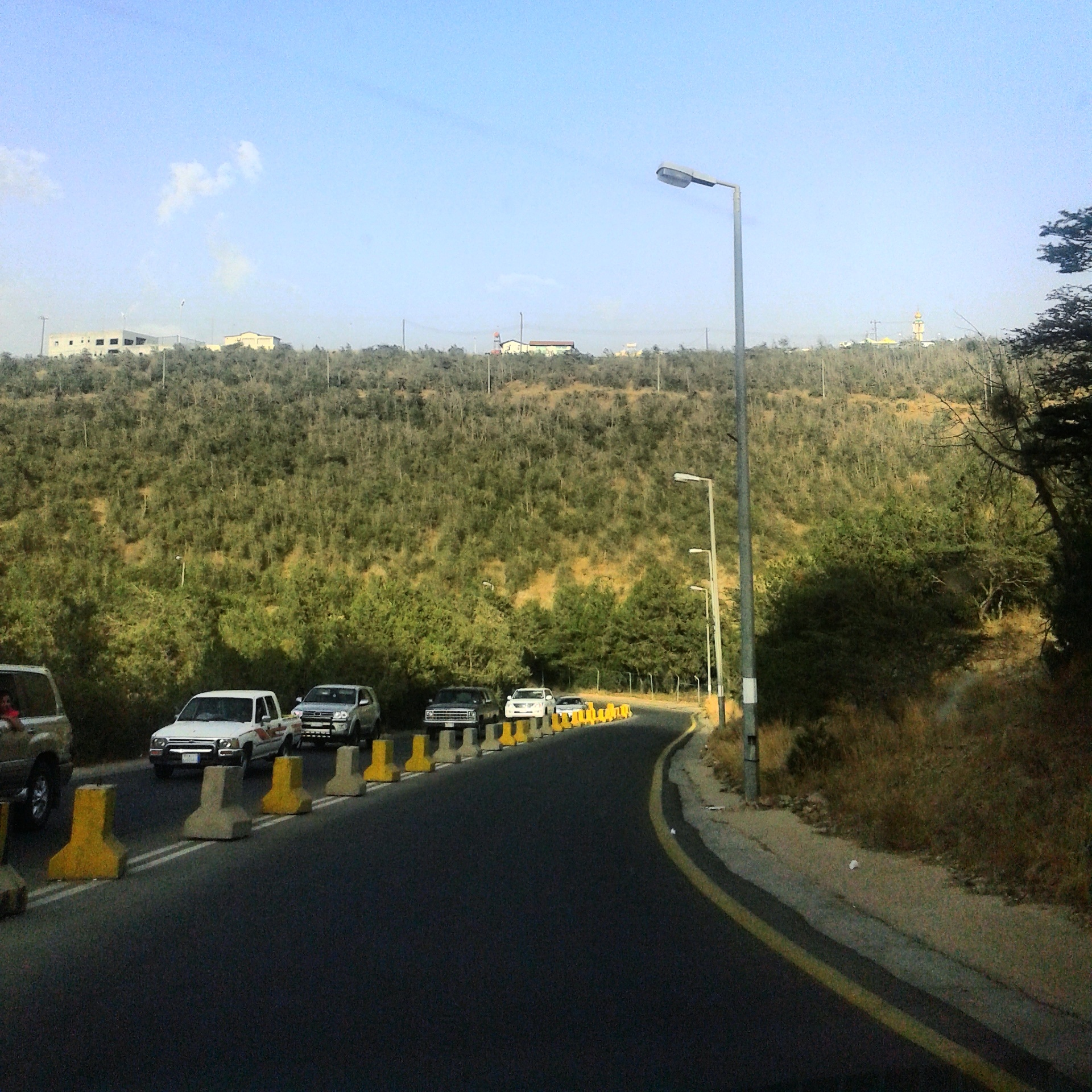

== See also ==
- Provinces of Saudi Arabia
- List of governorates of Saudi Arabia
- List of cities and towns in Saudi Arabia
- Sarawat Mountains
