= Lumi Rental =

Saudi car, bus, and motorcycle rental company

- Type: joint stock
- Founded: 2006; 20 years ago
- Headquarters: Riyadh, Saudi Arabia
- Website: lumirental.com

Lumi Rental (known as Lumi) is a Saudi Arabian company specializing in car, bus, and motorcycle rentals. It has been listed on the Saudi Stock Exchange (Tadawul) since 2023.

== History ==
Lumi was founded in 2006 as a subsidiary of Seera Group Holding under the brand name STRAC and operates in the car rental sector in Saudi Arabia. In 2021, Lumi opened branches at Taif International Airport and King Saud Domestic Airport in Al-Baha. The company also launched a touring and cruiser motorcycle rental service through kiosks located inside BMW and Harley-Davidson showrooms.

In September 2022, Lumi opened its first used-car showroom in Riyadh to sell vehicles taken out of its rental fleet, and later opened a showroom in Jeddah in 2023.

In April 2023, Lumi signed two long-term vehicle rental contracts with Saudi Aramco, covering the rental of 3,003 vehicles for periods ranging from three to five years. The following month, the company signed an agreement with Saudi Airlines to provide benefits to members of its loyalty program, including innovative transportation and car rental services. In June 2023, the company entered into a vehicle leasing agreement with Saudi Post to supply a fleet of 855 vehicles.

In November 2023, Lumi provided fleet management and transportation services to the Royal Commission for Al-Ula Governorate.

In 2023, Lumi embarked on an initial public offering (IPO) on the Saudi Stock Exchange (Tadawul). The company announced the offering in August, and its shares began trading in September of the same year, rising on their market debut.

Lumi launched its motorcycle rental services in Saudi Arabia in July 2024, opening branches in Riyadh and Jeddah. In November 2024, Lumi signed a letter of commitment for award and supply with the Saudi Technology and Security Comprehensive Control Company (Tahakom) to provide vehicle rental services.

In March 2025, Lumi opened its largest service and maintenance center in Tabuk to support its car and bus operations, in addition to its existing facilities in Riyadh, Jeddah, and Al Khobar. In June 2025, Lumi signed an agreement with the National Unified Procurement Company (NUPCO) to provide inventory management and medical supply transportation services.
