= Qilwah =

Governorate of Saudi Arabia

Coordinates: 20°00′N 41°05′E

Qilwah قلوة
- City and Governorate
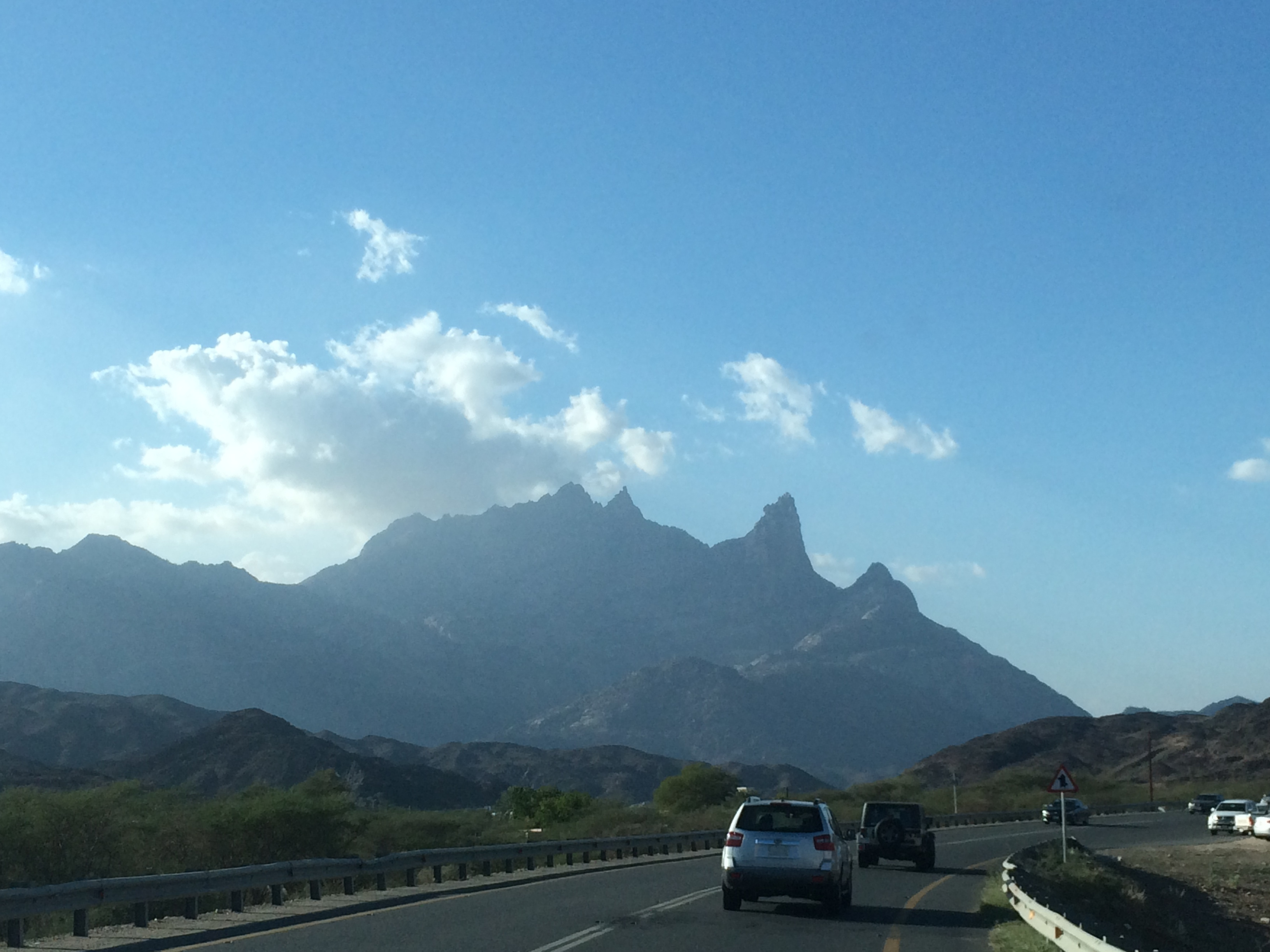
- Mount Shada, situated between Qilwah and Al-Mikhwah

- Location of Qilwah within Al-Baha Province
- Country: Saudi Arabia
- Province: Al-Baha Province
- Region: Hejaz

Government
  - Type: Municipality
  - Body: Qilwah Municipality

Population (2022)
  - Metro: 31,197 (Qilwah Governorate)
- Time zone: UTC+03:00 (SAST)
- Area code: 017

Qilwah (Arabic: قلوة, romanized: Qilwah) is a city and governorate in Al-Baha Province of Saudi Arabia. It is one of the administrative divisions of the province and includes several towns and villages.

== Sport ==
Qilwah Club is the biggest football club in the governorate.

== See also ==
- Provinces of Saudi Arabia
- List of governorates of Saudi Arabia
- List of cities and towns in Saudi Arabia
