= Baljurashi =

Baljurashi بَـلْـجُـرَشِي
- City and Governorate
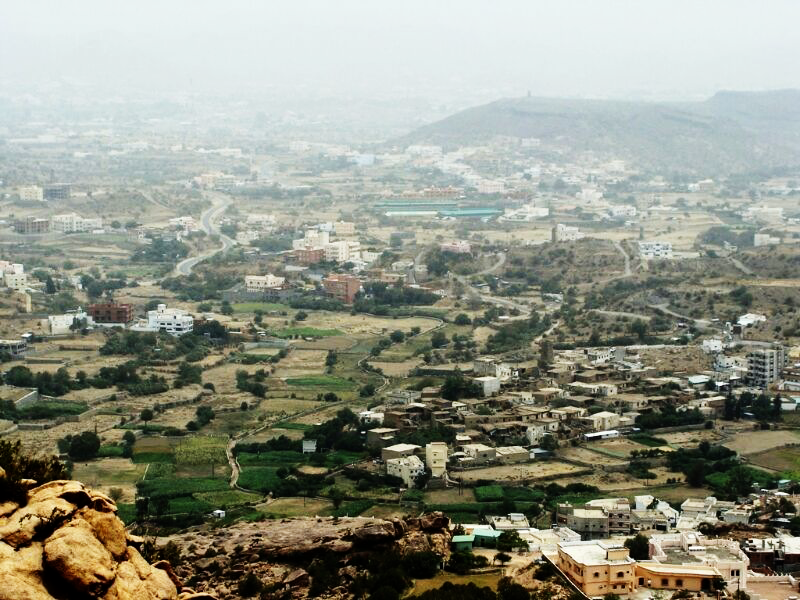

- Location of Baljurashi within Al-Baha Province

- Location of Baljurashi within Saudi Arabia
- Coordinates: 19°51′40″N 41°33′40″E
- Country: Saudi Arabia
- Province: Al-Baha Province
- Region: Hejaz

Government
  - Type: Municipality
  - Body: Baljurashi Municipality
- Elevation: 2,000 m (6,600 ft)

Population (2022)
  - Metro: 51,787 (Baljurashi Governorate)
- Time zone: UTC+03:00 (SAST)
- Area code: 017

Baljurashi also spelled as Biljurashi (Arabic: بِـلْـجُـرَشِي, romanized: Biljurashī) is a city and governorate in Al-Baha Province, south-western Saudi Arabia, and includes several towns and villages.

== Overview ==
Baljurashi is a medium-sized governorate located in the Al-Baha Province of southwestern Saudi Arabia. It was historically the capital of the province that includes the tribes of Ghamd and Zahran. The governorate lies on the Sarawat Mountains and serves as a major summer resort, known for its pleasant climate and natural beauty. The temperature usually varies between 2 °C (36 °F) in winter and 30 °C (86 °F) in summer. The best time to visit is from mid-August until the end of September.

A notable feature of Baljurashi is its forests, such as Raghadan Forest, which are so lush that visitors often find it hard to believe they are in Saudi Arabia. The governorate is referred to as "the land of one thousand and one watchtowers" and is known for its ancient seasonal camel trail, famously named "camel steps." These man-made steps were designed to help camels ascend the steep escarpment, and they stretch all the way down to the base of the mountains.

Most of the native people of Baljurashi reside outside the governorate; however, a significant number return during the summer vacation, leading to a considerable population increase during that period.

The people of Baljurashi have played an important role in the development of Saudi Arabia. Many prominent traders hail from the area, and it has long been a center of education and commerce in the south of the Kingdom. Historically, Baljurashi was an enlightenment hub and a key stop on old trade routes. A large number of its natives are academics who serve in universities and colleges throughout Saudi Arabia.

The governorate is also notable for its contribution to the industrial and commercial sectors. Many individuals from Baljurashi have held high-ranking positions in national firms, particularly in Saudi Aramco, where several vice presidents are originally from the area.

Baljurashi is considered a tribal governorate predominantly inhabited by members of the Ghamd tribe—one of the large and well-known tribes in Saudi Arabia. The Ghamid tribe dates back to pre-Islamic times and has produced many notable muḥaddithūn (Arabic:مُـحَـدِّثُـون), narrators or transmitters) of the Sunnah of the Prophet Muhammad (Arabic:نَـبِي), Nabī).

== Wildlife ==
The nimr (Arabic:نِـمْـر, leopard) was reported in Wadi Khatayn, south of Baljurashi, in 2002, and the species was confirmed by killings, several reports of sightings from different witnesses, livestock killed and the presences of tracks and signs. However, camera traps deployed there during 2002 and 2003 failed to obtain pictures of leopards.

== Sport club ==
Al-Hejaz Club is the main football club representing the Baljurashi governorate.

== See also ==
- Provinces of Saudi Arabia
- List of governorates of Saudi Arabia
- List of cities and towns in Saudi Arabia
