= Al-Qura =

Al-Qura القرى
- City and Governorate
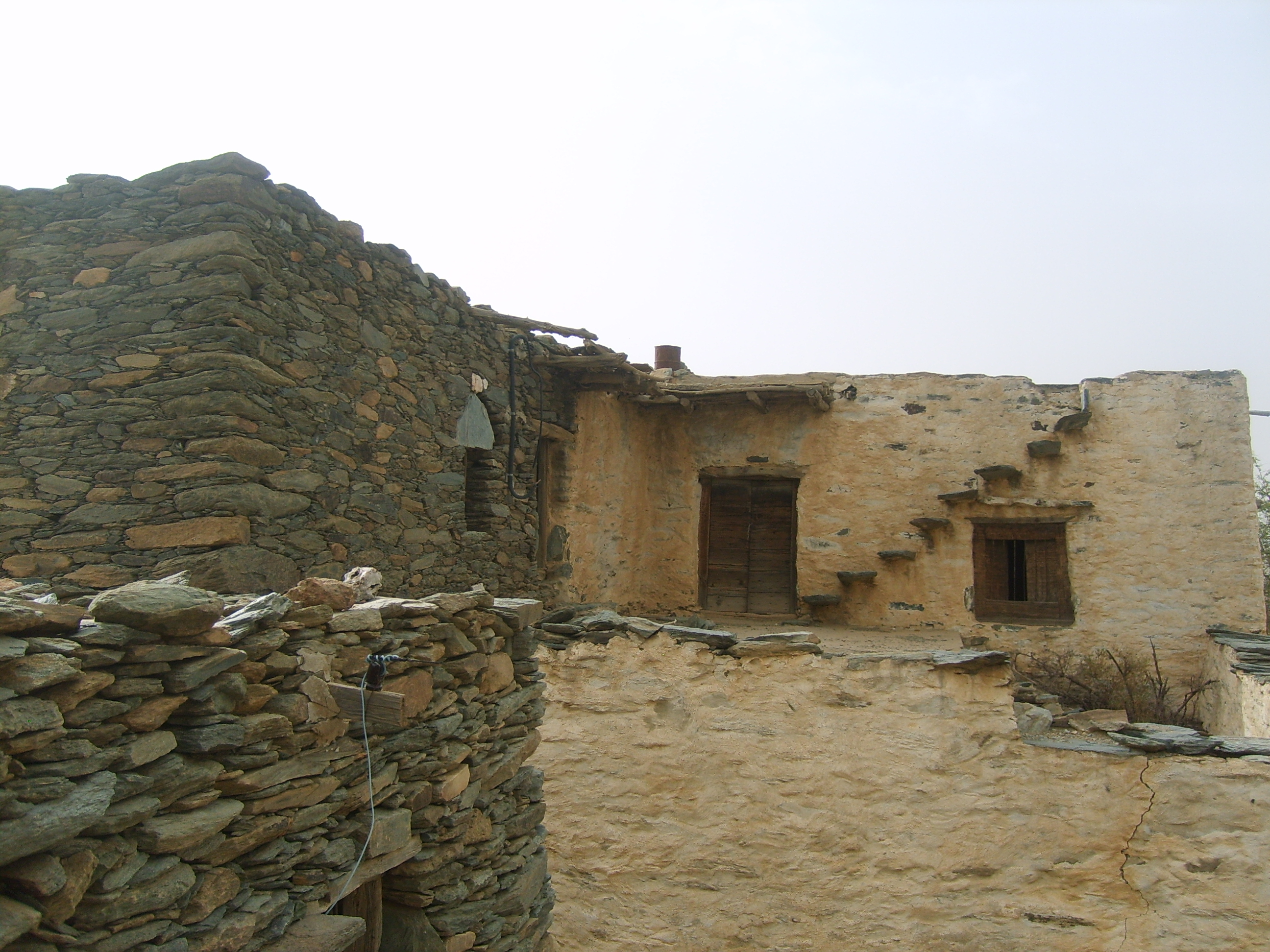
- historical old houses of Al-Hakman

- Location of Al-Qura within Al-Baha Province
- Coordinates: 29°53′N 40°13′E
- Country: Saudi Arabia
- Province: Al-Baha Province
- Region: Hejaz

Government
  - Type: Municipality
  - Body: Al-Qura Municipality

Population (2022)
  - Metro: 19,586 (Al-Qura Governorate)
- Time zone: UTC+03:00 (SAST)
- Area code: 017

Al-Qura (Arabic: القرى, romanized: al-Qurā) is a city and governorate in Al-Baha Province of Saudi Arabia. It is one of the administrative divisions of the province and includes several towns and villages.

== Sport ==
Al-Ain FC, the main football club representing Al-Qura Governorate.

== See also ==
- Provinces of Saudi Arabia
- List of governorates of Saudi Arabia
- List of cities and towns in Saudi Arabia
