= Al-Baha Province =

Administrative region of Saudi Arabia

Al-Baha الباحة
- Province
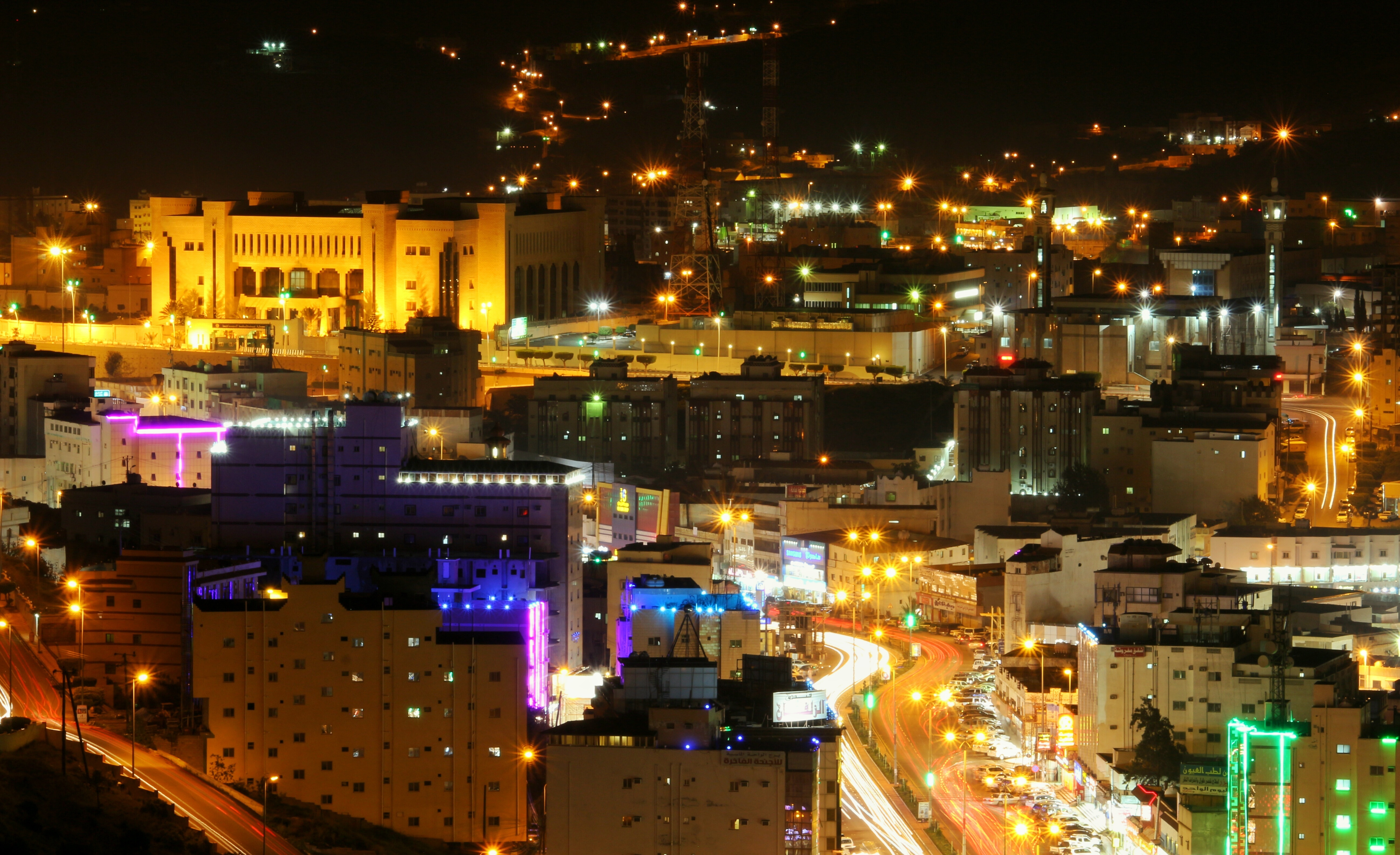
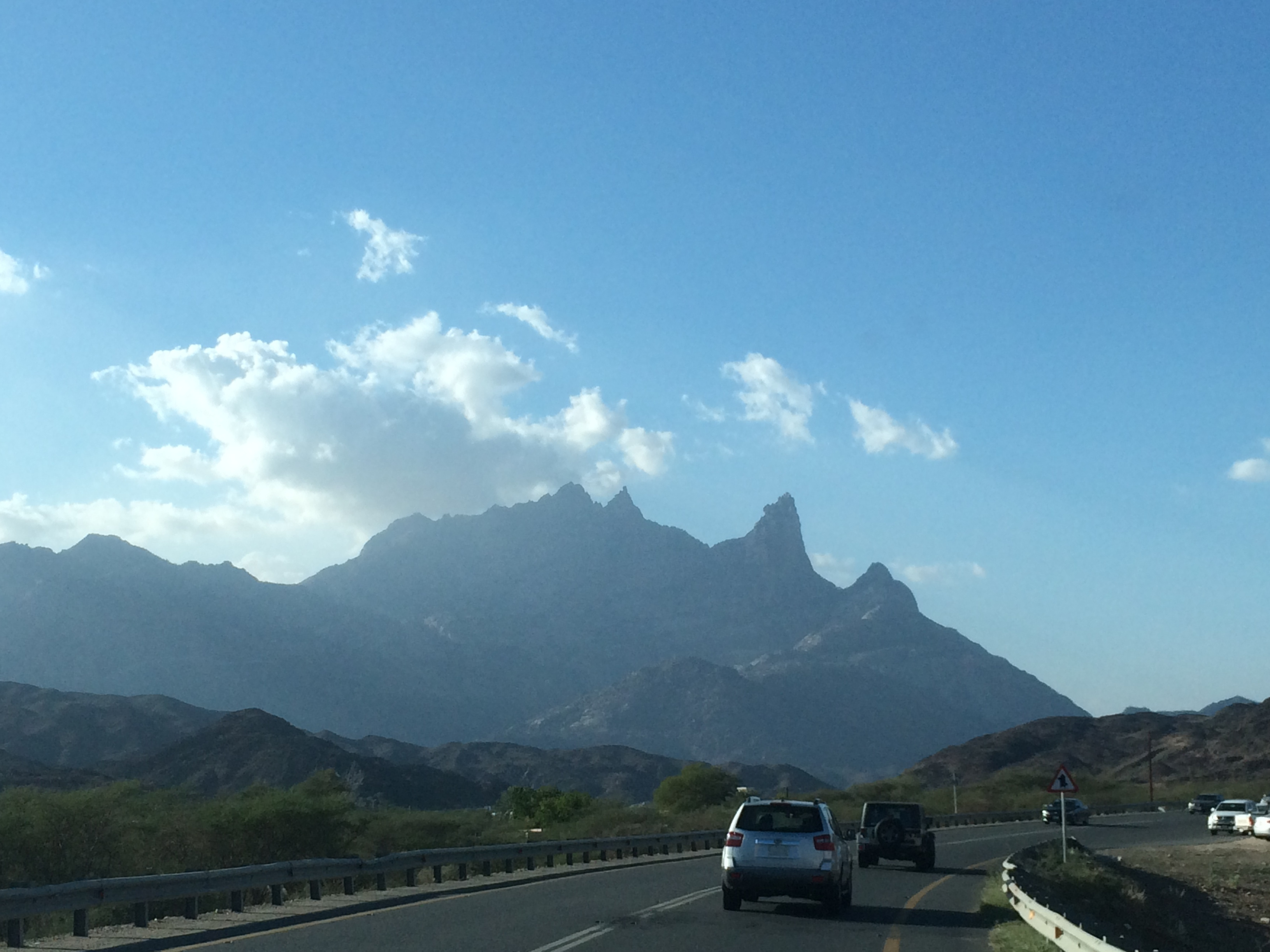
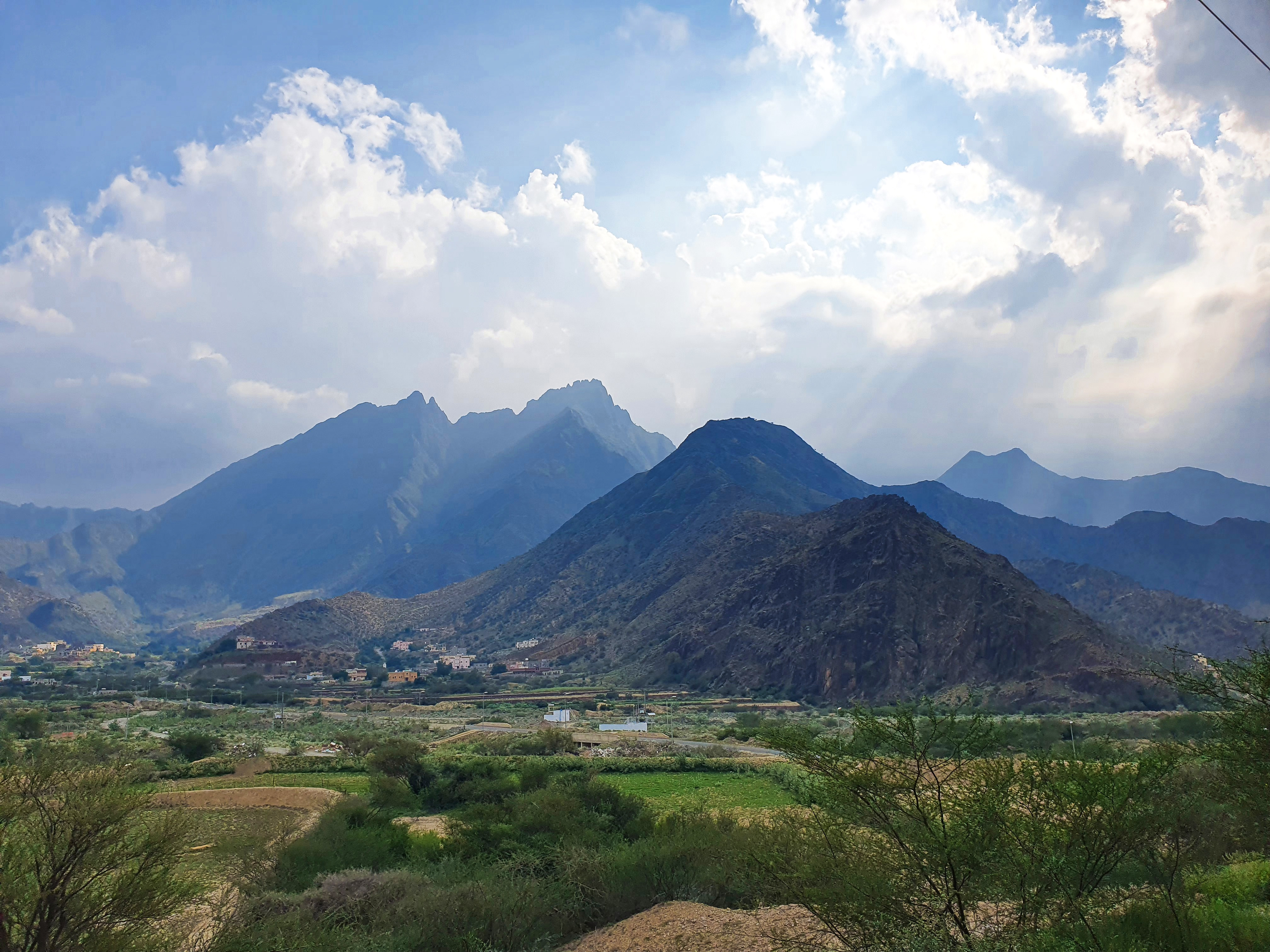
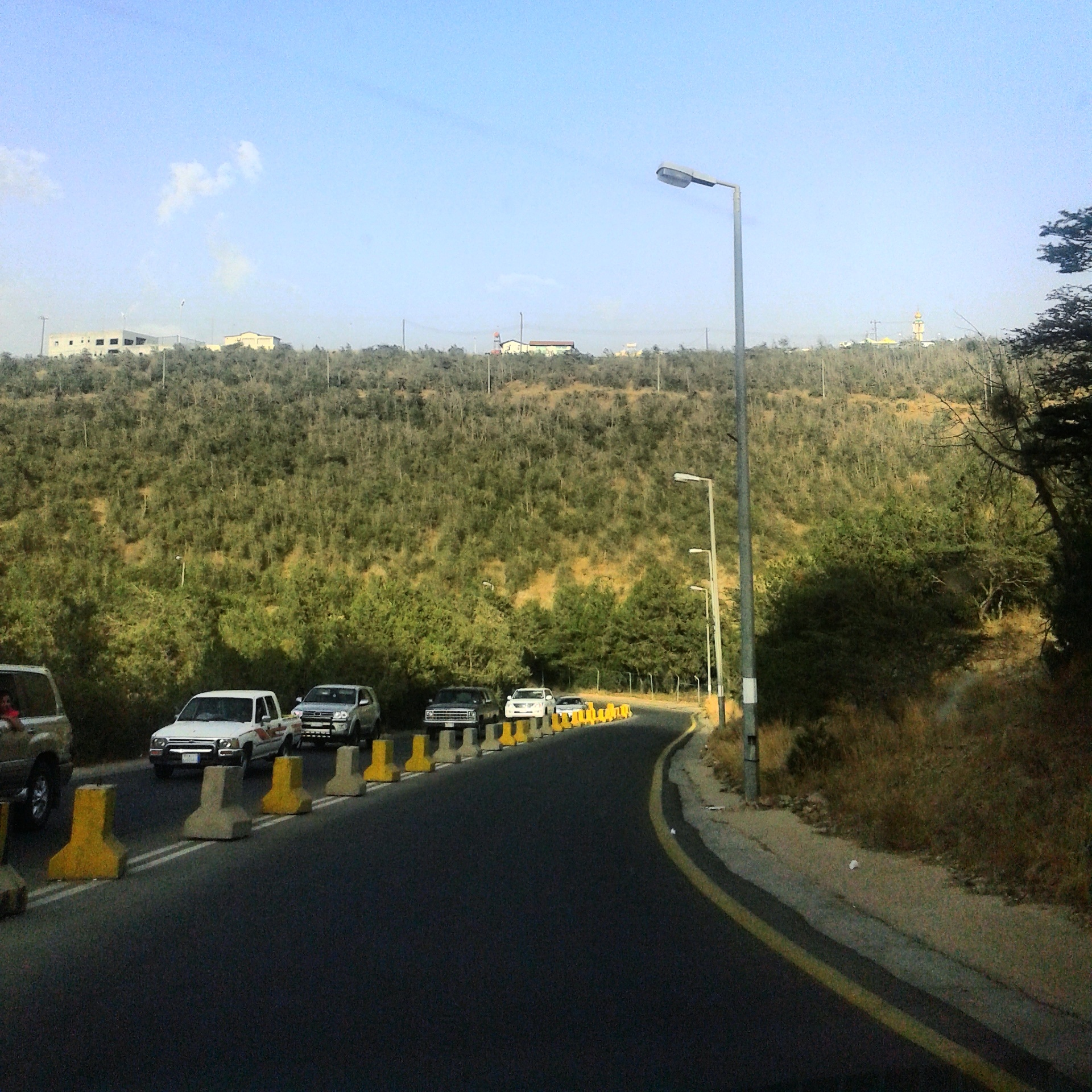
- Al-Baha City Mount Shada Sarawat Mountains Raghadan Forest

- Map of Saudi Arabia with Al-Baha highlighted
- Coordinates: 20°00′45″N 41°27′55″E
- Country: Saudi Arabia
- Region: Hejaz
- Capital and administrative center: Al-Baha
- Governorates: 9

Government
  - Type: Municipality
  - Body: Al-Baha Municipality
  - Governor: Hussam bin Saud

Area
  - Total: 9,921 km^{2} (3,831 sq mi)
- Highest elevation (Mount Shada): 2,200 m (7,200 ft)

Population (2022 census)
  - Total: 339,174
  - Density: 34.19/km^{2} (88.55/sq mi)
- Time zone: UTC+03:00 (SAST)
- ISO 3166-2: SA–11
- Area code: 017
- Website: baha.gov.sa/en

Al-Baha Province, also known as Al-Baha Region (Arabic: ٱلْبَاحَة, romanized: al-Bāḥa, pronounced [alˈbaːħa], lit. 'open space'), also spelled as Al-Bahah (Note: The spelling Al-Baha is the official form used in Saudi government publications and international references.), is a province in Saudi Arabia. It is the smallest Saudi province in terms of both area and population.

== History ==
=== History of the Province Before Islam ===
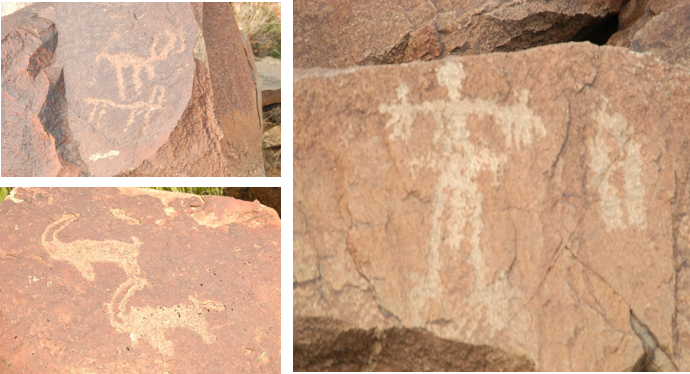
Rock carvings dating back to the Stone Age, consisting of several rocks atop a mountain, featuring depictions of ibexes, human figures, and scribbles in the village of Al-Mafarjah, south of Al-Baha city

The province was the setting for the final days of the famous vagabond poet Al-Shanfara. It also produced rulers who governed parts of Oman and Iraq. The area contains inscriptions in Hebrew and others in the Musnad script, in addition to the idol Dhu al-Khalasa of the Daws tribe, and various other ancient Arabian carvings, inscriptions, and writings scattered on rocks in the province's mountains and valleys.

=== Ancient Inhabitants of the Province ===
The Sarawat Mountains, which include the highlands of Al-Baha, were once inhabited by the Amalek a group from the pre-Islamic extinct Arabs. They remained there until they were overpowered and displaced from the entire Sarawat region by the Ghatareef, descendants of Al-Harith bin Abdullah bin Yashkur bin Mubashir bin Sa‘b bin Dahman bin Nasr bin Zahran of the Azd tribe. The Ghatareef then settled the Azd in the Sarawat.

=== Early Islamic History of the Province ===
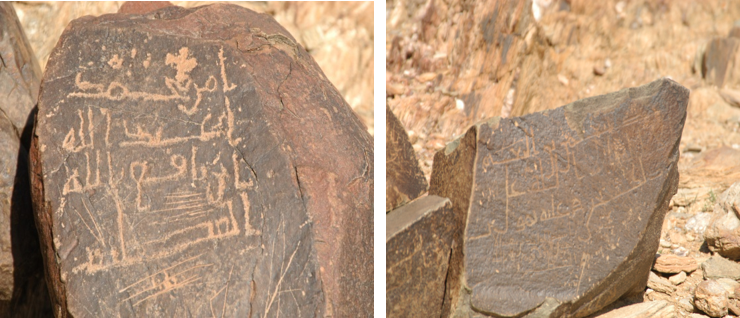
An archaeological inscription in northern Al-Qura Governorate, near the historical site of Manhal, known for numerous early Islamic inscriptions in the Kufic script.

The province is known for producing many prominent companions of the Islamic prophet Muhammad, including Abu Dhubyan al-A‘raj, Malik ibn Awf, and Abu Hurayra who is regarded as one of the most prolific narrators of Hadith in the Sunni tradition. Other notable companions from the area include Tufayl ibn Amr.

In the second half of 2023, a total of 150 archaeological artifacts were discovered at the site of Al-Ma‘mlah in Al-Baha Province, including a pottery jar bearing early Islamic inscriptions.

=== The Province Before the Modern Era ===
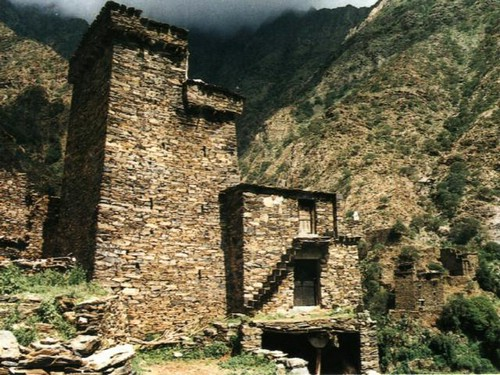
The historical village of Naʿāsh

Before modern administrative organization, governance in the province was primarily based on tribal leadership structures in the province and served as the main authority. The Zahran tribe had a single paramount sheikh representing all its clans, as did the Ghamd tribe, both tribes were involved in battles against the Ottomans, as documented by numerous historical sources and even Ottoman manuscripts. Additionally, the province had many supporters of the religious reform movement led by Muhammad ibn Abd al-Wahhab, and Some groups in the province supported the First Saudi state, particularly during its early formation.

=== Administrative Formation Stages ===
Al-Baha Province was established as an independent administrative province during the reign of King Faisal. Before that, it was known as the Emirate of Al-Dhafeer and was subordinate to that region since the time of King Abdulaziz. Following a request from the people of Al-Dhafeer to relocate the administrative center, it was moved to Baljurashi.

Later, King Faisal appointed Saud bin Abdul Rahman as governor of[Baljurashi and authorized him to select a suitable location for a new regional emirate. He chose the village of Al-Baha, located in the area of Bani Abdullah, approximately midway between the Ghamd and Zahran tribes. Consequently, the Emirate of Al-Baha Province was formally established, aligning with the administrative structure of other Saudi provinces.

== Overview ==
The province is located in the southwestern part of the Hejaz region, having its capital at Al-Baha. It includes several cities and towns, such as Al-Mikhwah, Baljorashi, Rahwat Albar, and Sabt Alalaya.

Baljorashi is known for its historic traditional market, Sūq as-Sabt (سُوْق ٱلسَّبْت), which translates to "Saturday Market" in English. The market is old, and its exact age is unknown.

Al-Baha Province has a rich historical and cultural heritage, influenced by its strategic location along ancient trade routes. The region is home to several significant archaeological sites, including the ancient village of Thee Ain, which dates back to the 8th century. This village is renowned for its polished stone houses and a mosque adjacent to a river, reflecting the area's historical significance.

The province is the homeland of two prominent Azd tribes: the Ghamd and the Zahran. These tribes have contributed to the region's folklore, music, and dance, preserving their heritage through generations. The presence of ancient mining sites, such as Khayal Al-Masna' and Al-Aqeeq, further underscores the area's historical importance.

In recognition of its unique cultural and natural assets, Al-Baha has been designated as a health resort area by the World Health Organization, highlighting its commitment to preserving its heritage while promoting sustainable tourism.

== Geography ==
Al-Baha Province is located in the southwestern Hejaz region of Saudi Arabia, bordered by Mecca Province to the north, west, and southwest, and the Asir Province to the southeast. It is the country's smallest province by area, covering approximately 9,921 km^{2}.

The province features diverse topography, with the Sarawat mountain range dominating the eastern part, where elevations reach between 1,500 and 2,450 meters above sea level. This mountainous terrain consists of steep cliffs and deep valleys, providing a temperate climate and rich vegetation. To the west lies the Tihamah coastal plain, known for hot, humid conditions with minimal rainfall. The central and eastern parts contain hills and plateaus, which experience cooler temperatures and sparse vegetation.

Al-Baha is noted for its natural beauty, including 53 forests and wildlife areas such as Raghdan, Ghomsan, Fayk, and Aljabal. The region also features traditional villages, terraced fields, and natural springs, enhancing its appeal as a tourist destination.

== Etymology ==
The word al-Baḥa (or Baḥa without al which is equivalent to "the" in English) has a number of meanings; it means water and the maximum of it, the courtyard of a house, the high and abundant palm tree. In tales it refers to an extremely deep bottomless well in al-Zafir fortress. It means "open space", "water" and "abundant palm tree" and the "midline of a road".

== Geography ==
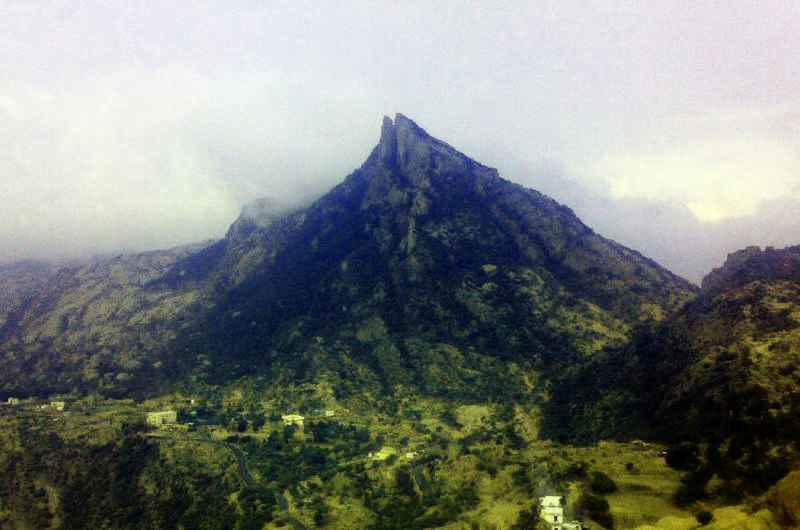
Jabal Atherb (جَبَل أَثرْب)

Al-Baḥa is the name of the province as well its capital city, situated in the northwestern part of Ghamed territory. The region is formed of mountains, hills, plains, valleys and desert stretches. This region is situated in the Hejaz, between longitudes 41/42 E and latitudes 19/20 N. The region covers an area about 36,000 km^{2}.

== Governorates ==
There are 9 governorates in Al-Baha Province, with Al-Baha City serving as the provincial capital and administrative center. As of 2022, Al-Baha city had a population of 90,515.

Administrative Divisions
#	Division	Type	Capital	Population (2022)
1	Baljurashi	Governorate	Baljurashi City	51,787
2	Al-Mikhwah	Governorate	Al-Mikhwah City	48,333
3	Al-Aqiq	Governorate	Al-Aqiq City	37,608
4	Bani Hasan	Governorate	Bani Hasan City	35,082
5	Qilwah	Governorate	Qilwah City	31,197
6	Al-Mandaq	Governorate	Al-Mandaq City	20,010
7	Al-Qura	Governorate	Al-Qura City	19,586
8	Ghamid al-Zinad	Governorate	Ghamid al-Zinad City	12,506
9	Al-Hujrah	Governorate	Al-Hujrah City	12,136

== Topography ==
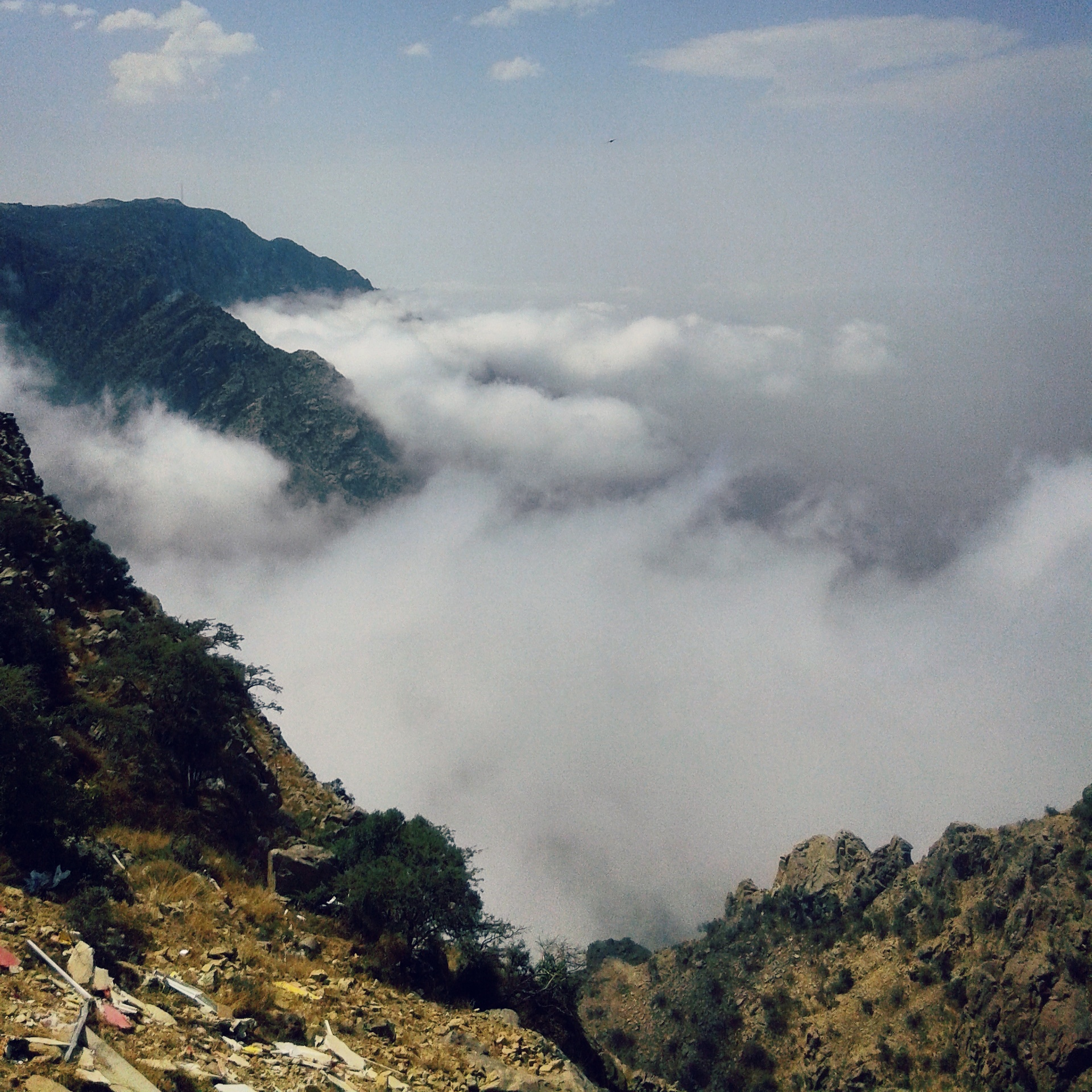
Clouds next to the Sarat Mountains

The region is divided by huge rocky steeps into two main sectors. To the west is a coastal plain, the Tihamah. To the east is the mountain range of al-As-Sarawat or the Sarat, with an elevation of 1,500 to 2,450 m (4,920 to 8,040 ft) above sea level.

== Population ==
Historical population
Year	Pop.	±% p.a.
1992	332,157	—
2004	377,900	+1.08%
2010	412,520	+1.47%
2022	339,174	−1.62%

== Climate ==
The variation in topography influences the climate of the region. Al-Sarat area is exposed to the formation of clouds and fog, and this often happens in winter because of air masses coming from the Red Sea, accompanied by thunderstorms. In spring and summer the climate is mild and pleasant. The climate in the area of the Tihamah is different from that in Al-Sarat, although they are separated by no more than 25 km (16 miles). The Tihama is an undulating coastal plain, hot in summer, warm in spring and mild in winter. The climate in general falls in the arid zone. Relative humidity varies between 52% and 67%, with maximum temperatures of 23 °C (73 °F), and minimum temperatures of 12 °C (54 °F).

== Gallery ==
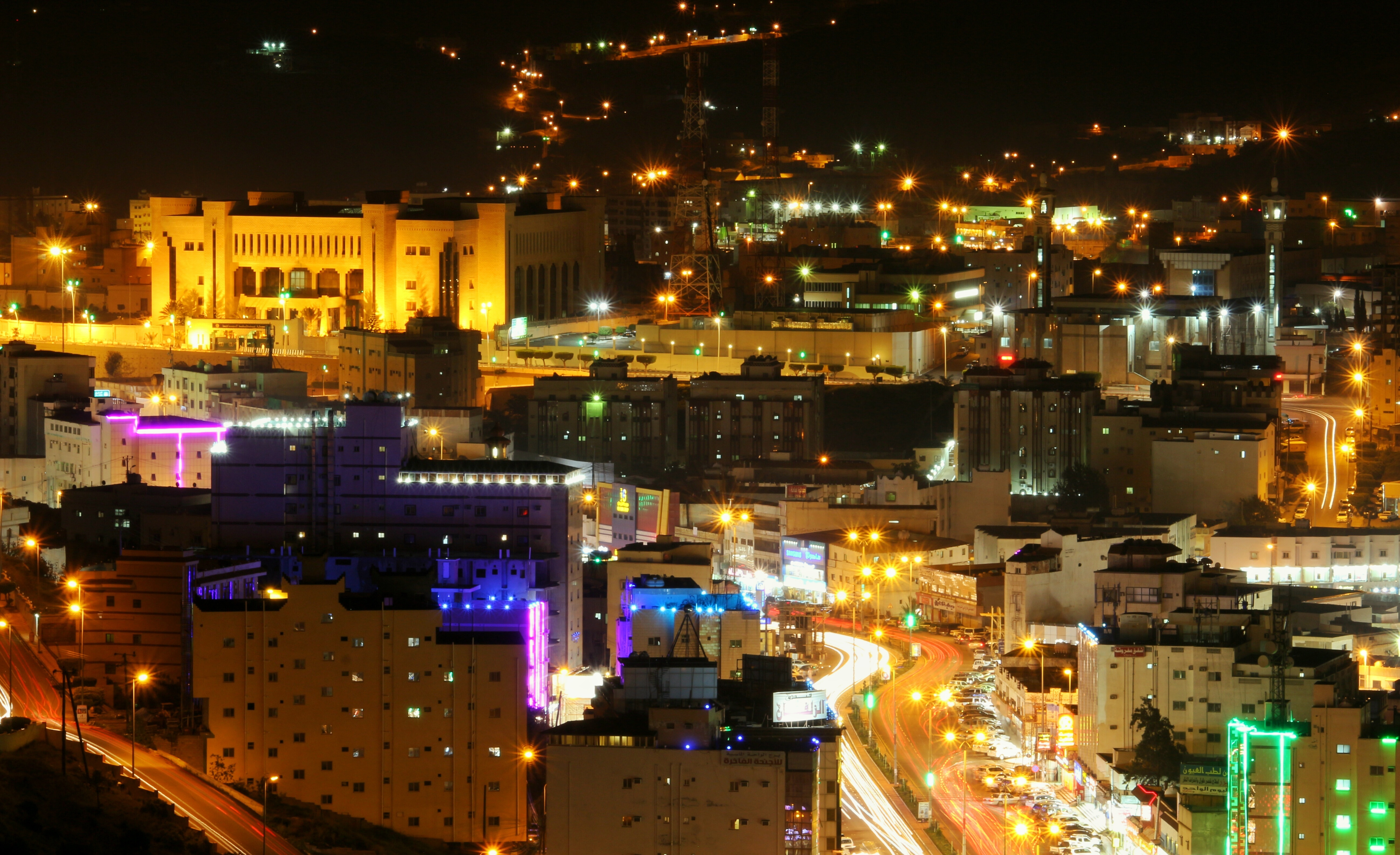
Al-Baha City

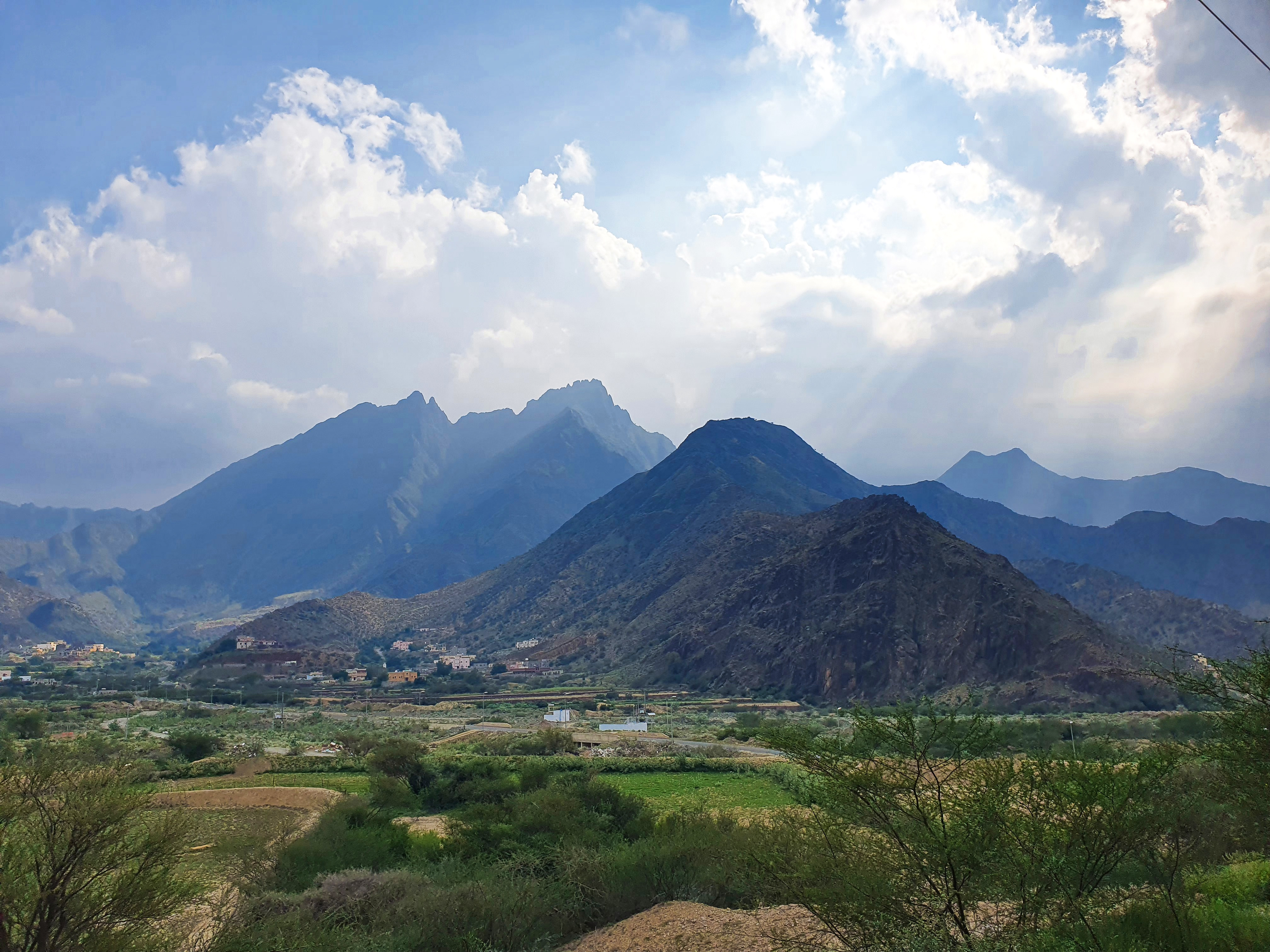
Sarawat Mountains in Al-Baha

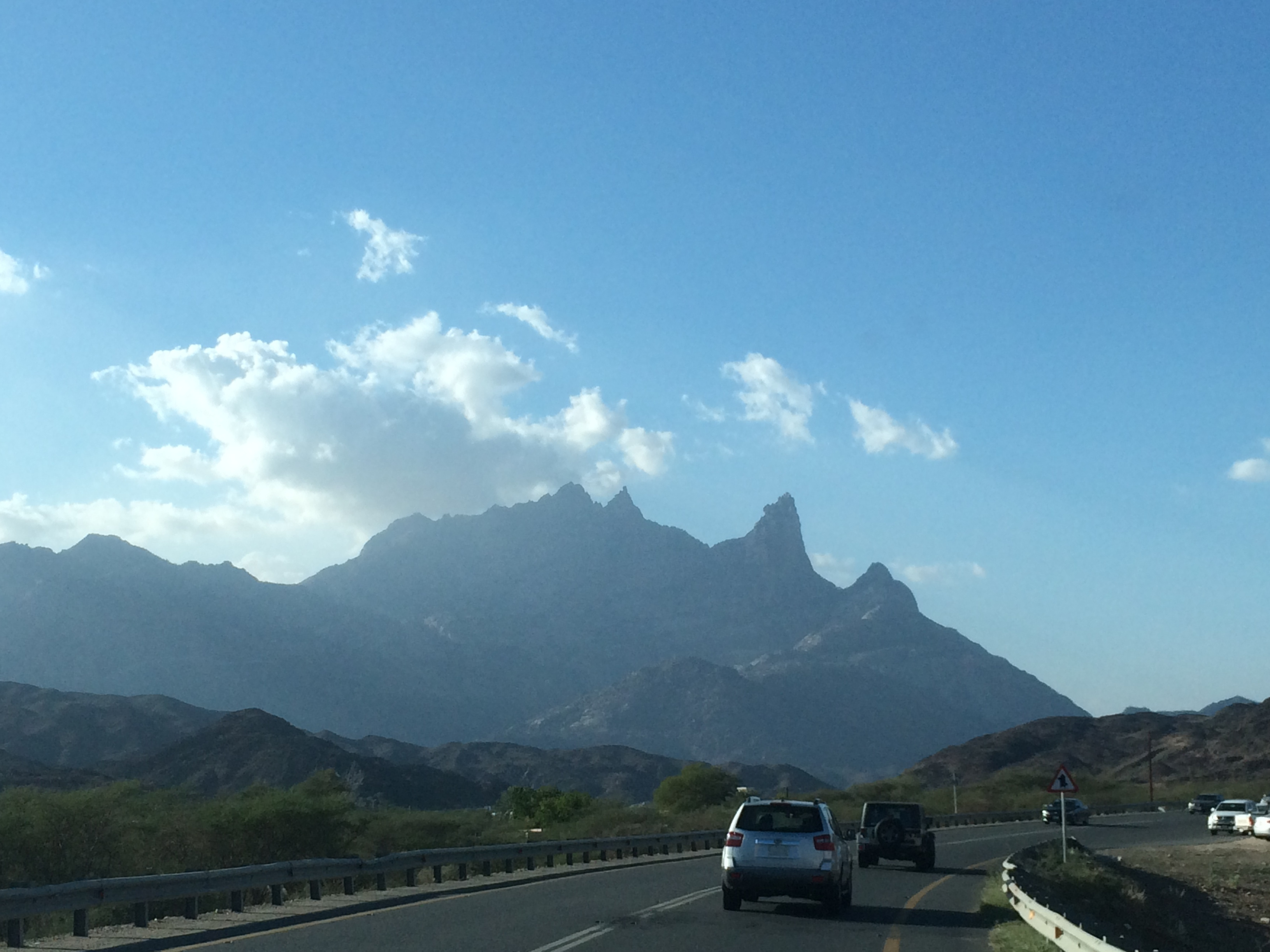
Mount Shada

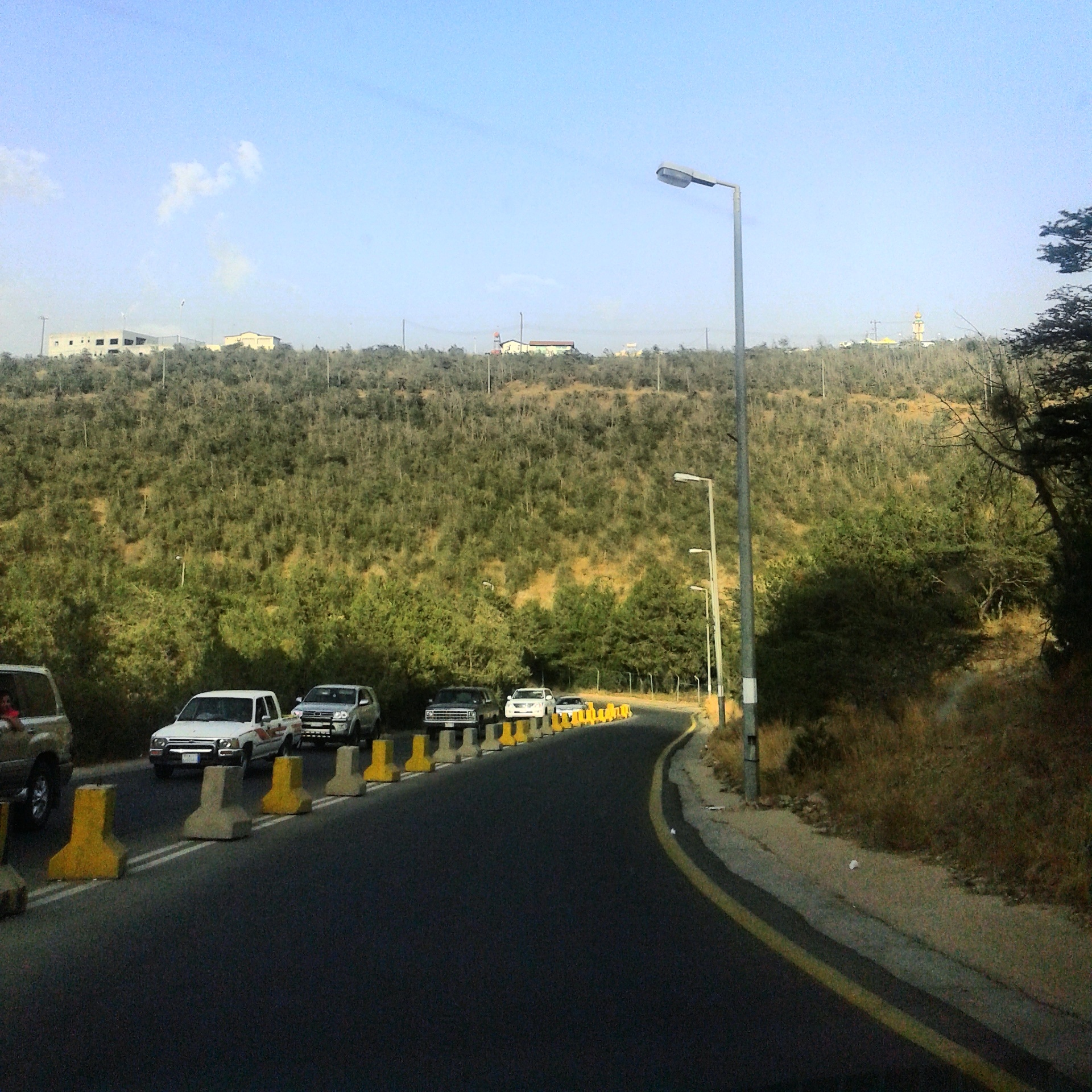
Raghadan Forest

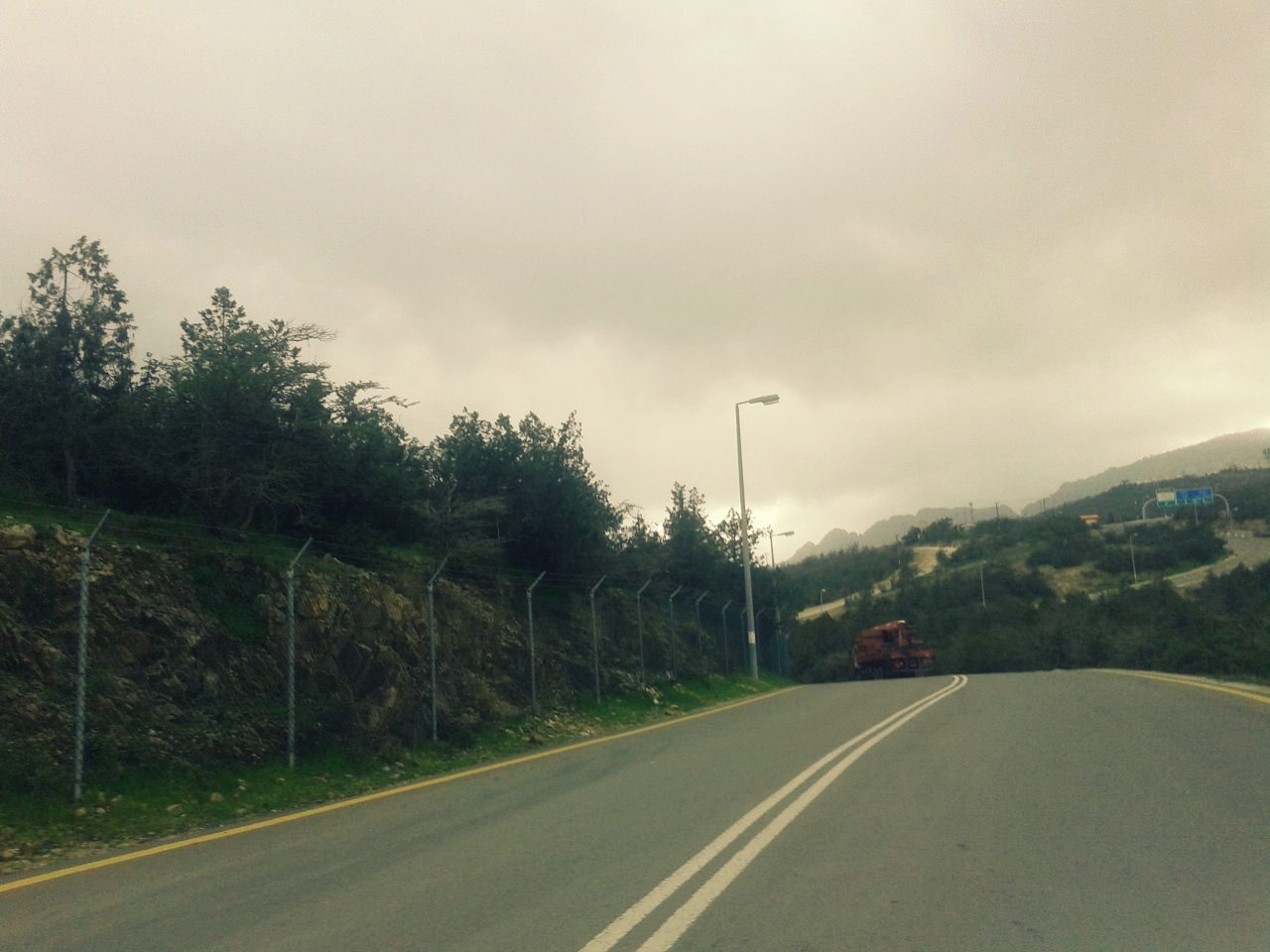
Raghadan Forest

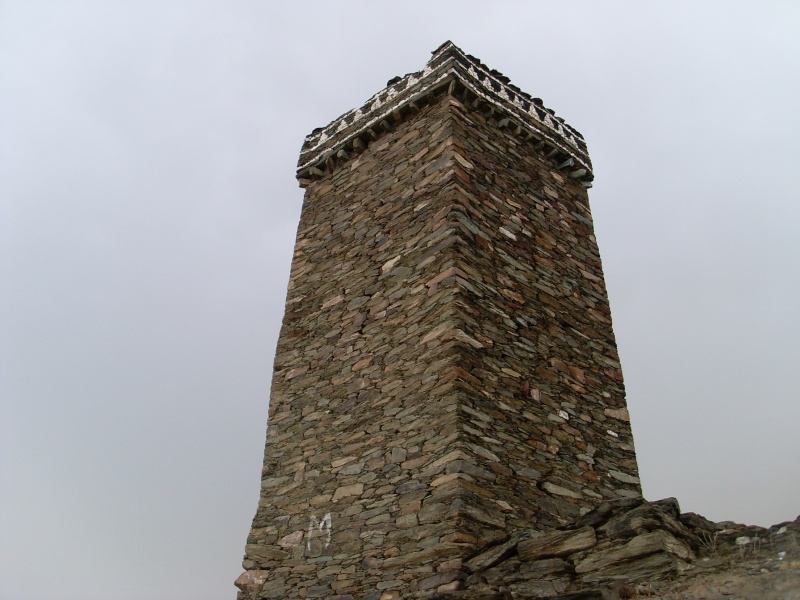
Awirah Village Fort

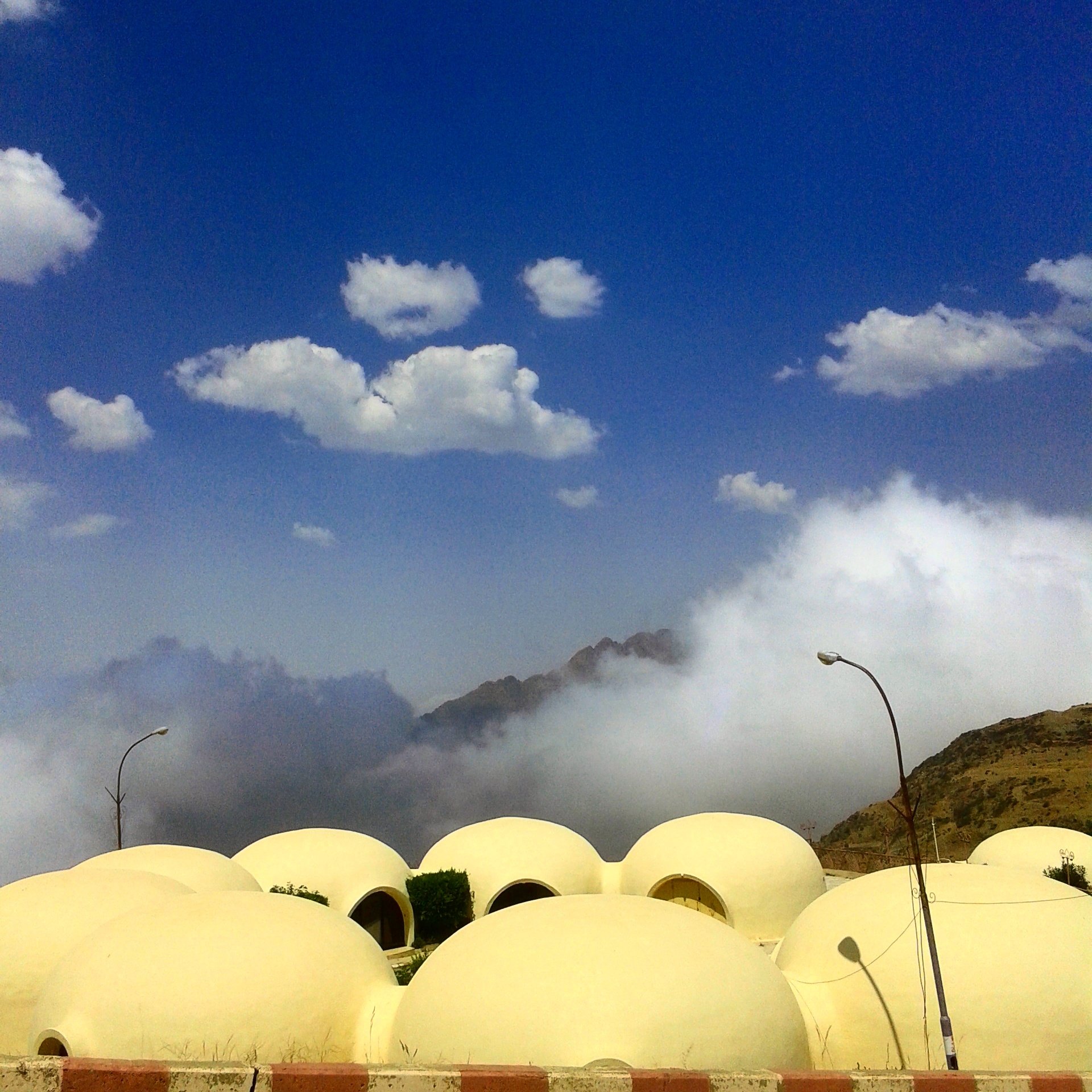

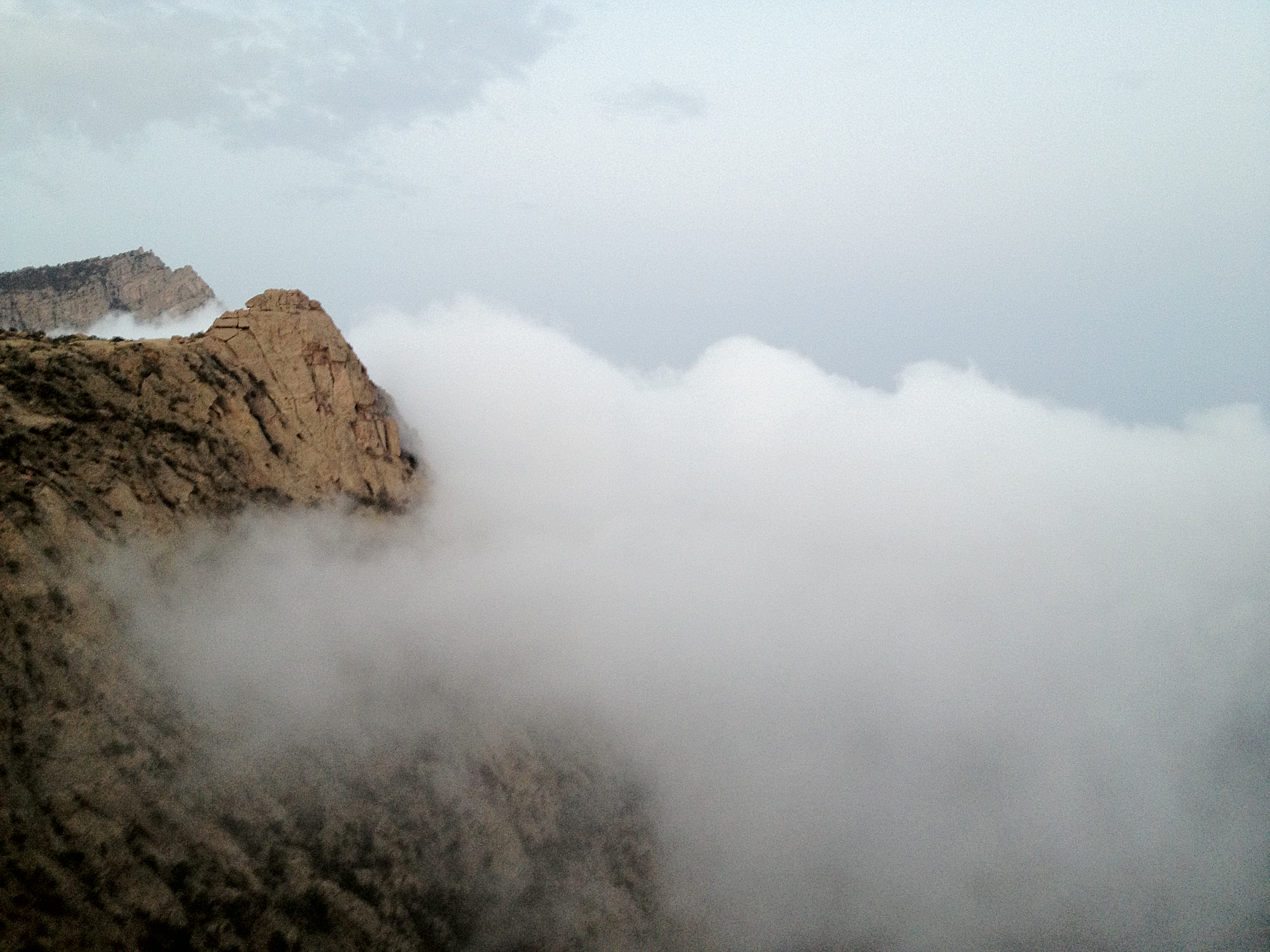

== Transportation ==
=== Air ===
Al-Baha Province is served by King Saud Domestic Airport, located in Al-Aqiq, offering domestic flights only. For international travel, residents use nearby airports such as Abha International Airport, Taif International Airport, or King Abdulaziz International Airport in Jeddah.

=== Roads ===
The province is connected by major roads, including the Al-Baha–Taif Highway and the Al-Baha–Abha Road, along with several mountain routes linking the highlands to the Tihamah region.

== List of governors ==
Name	Term of Office	Monarch(s)
Office established
Saud bin Abdul Rahman	1962 – 1977	Saud, Faisal, Khalid
Ibrahim bin Abdulaziz	1977 – 1987	Khalid, Fahd
Muhammed bin Saud	1987 – 2010	Fahd, Abdullah
Mishari bin Saud	28 August 2010 – 22 April 2017	Abdullah, Salman
Hussam bin Saud	22 April 2017 – present	Salman

== See also ==
- Provinces of Saudi Arabia
- List of governorates of Saudi Arabia
- List of cities and towns in Saudi Arabia
