= Shadah Al-asfal =

Mountain in Sarawat Range, Saudi Arabia

Shadah Al-asfal Mountain
- Saudi Arabia

Highest point
- Elevation: 2,200 m (7,200 ft)
- Coordinates: 19°44′05.8″N 41°22′52.8″E

Geography
- Parent range: Sarawat Mountains

Geology
- Rock age: Cambrian

Shadah Al-asfal Mountain is one of the Sarawat Mountains in southwestern Saudi Arabia and is considered one of the highest mountains in the Kingdom.

== Name ==
Shadah in Arabic comes from singing. And it was mentioned in Mu'jam al-Buldan book as part of the two mountains, Sadah Al-asfal and Shadah Al-a'laa.

== Location and borders ==
Sadah Al-asfal and Shadah Al-a'laa is the name given to a mountain range located in Tihamah Al-Bahah near the city of Makhwah and Qilwah, at an altitude of more than 2200 meters. The range located among the low plains of Tihamah, it is bordered on the southern side by the Shadah Al-asfal Mountain, which reaches a height of more than 1,500 meters above sea level.

Shadah Al-asfal Mountain is located in southwestern Saudi Arabia and is inhabited by the Zahran tribe, which owns Shadah Al-asfal Mountain, and the Ghamd tribe, which owns Shadah Al-a'laa Mountain. It is one of the mountains of the Al Bahah region, on which the villages of Shadah Al-asfal are located. Shadah Al-asfal Mountain is bordered on the east by Makhwah Governorate, on the west by the Qarama Mountains, on the south by Al Khuraig and Bani Shorafa, and the north by Shadah Al-a'laa and Nira Valley.

== Natural characteristics ==
Shadah Al-asfal Mountain is characterized by the abundance of large granite rocks, especially those standing rock masses called Nadba, which are almost two hundred meters long. The mountain also has several dark plateaus and caves under the rocks.

Dr. Ahmed Qashash, a researcher in archaeology, said: "Shadah Al-asfal Mountain and Shadah Al-a'laa Mountain, are composed of granite igneous rocks that have been uplifted and exposed since ancient times as a result of mountain-building earth movements, dating back to the Precambrian periods which is the earliest geologic age in the history of the earth's formation. The natural features of these two mountains include caves and caverns, formed by millions of years of erosion, others were formed by the infiltration of gases from the magma during crystallization into the outer part of the magma, leaving spherical, rectangular, or elliptical cavities in their place, they vary in size from rock to rock and are very abundant in these two mountains, especially the Shadah Al-asfal Mountain. Other caves are formed when huge boulders fall on top of other rocks, creating large cavernous spaces between them. These caves are fortified natural habitats that have been inhabited by humans since the first man, and remain an ideal home for the people of these two mountains."

== Villages ==
Shadah Mountain is inhabited by approximately 4,000 inhabitants distributed among villages, some of which are located at the top of the mountain and others at the northern and western ends, These villages include:

- Alro'os: It serves as the capital and is located at the top of the mountain. It is an agricultural land in which there were coffee, pomegranate, and banana plantations and some fruits and vegetables as well. Most of these crops have perished due to the lack of rain and the absence of dams to conserve water.
- Alfarea: Which is the second large village after Alro'os.
- Alashraaf: Located on top of the mountain.
- Rahban: Located west of Alro'os Village.
- Alnemra: Located west of Rahban.
- Altwaref: South to Alnemra.
- Aldahna: Located to the southwest of Alro'os Village.
- Tha'lab: Located to the north of Alro'os Village.
- Alasaha: West of Tha'lab.
- Altaraf: Located in the north part of the mountain, close to its foothill.
- Hazah: It is located in a deep chasm to the southeast of the village of Altaraf and its inhabitants are Bani Umar Tribe.
- Adad: Located at the mountains' foothill to the south.
- Alroos: At the top of the mountain, southwest of Alro'os.
- Alshefa: It is located at the top of the mountain overlooking Tihamah.
- Alaradia: Located on the east of Alashraaf, on the road leading to Alshefa.

There are a few valleys affiliated with the mountain including Dhi Hada, Tajma, Nat'a, Kharas, Nawan, and Helfa.

== Education ==
In 1388 AH, the first elementary school for boys was opened, with 45 students enrolled in the first year, followed by other classes of students in the following years. In 1393 AH, the first class of the school graduated, ten of whom ranked in the top ten in the Al-Qunfudhah educational district before Al-Makhwah joined Al-Baha district later. The first in the Kingdom's primary schools was also one of the top ten, and he was awarded a financial prize of 1,500 riyals from the Ministry of Education at the time to encourage him. An elementary school for boys was also opened in the village of Tha'lab in 1403 AH, followed by an intermediate school in the village of Alfarea, which opened its doors to students in 1407 AH. The first elementary school for girls was opened in 1403 AH in Alfarea, followed by a school for girls in the village of Tha'lab in the year 1404 AH, and in 1412 AH, the first intermediate school for girls in Shadah was opened in the village of Alfarea.

== History ==
Nabataean inscriptions are found throughout ancient paintings, such as the one at Rahwat al-Dahnah, depict the lives of the sultans and the crowns on their heads. It is also found in a cave in Alashraaf and also in the village of Alaradia. Also in the cave of Al-Adah in Alfarea Village in front of the old school and in many parts of the mountain, as for Nabataean writings and symbols, they are found in the village of Alashraaf, specifically in Al-Harir and Shafa Al-Sakhra.

== See also ==
- List of mountains in Saudi Arabia
