= Al-Mandaq =

Al-Mandaq المندق
- City and Governorate
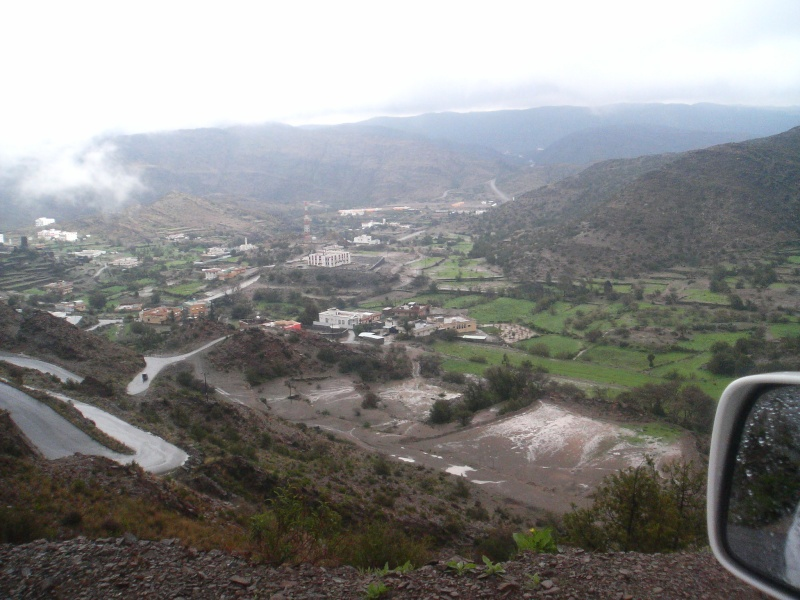
- Meshinah Village

- Location of Al-Mandaq within Al-Baha Province

- Location within Saudi Arabia
- Coordinates: 20°11′N 41°14′E
- Country: Saudi Arabia
- Province: Al-Baha Province
- Region: Hejaz

Government
  - Type: Municipality
  - Body: Al-Mandaq Municipality

Population (2022)
  - Metro: 20,010 (Al-Mandaq Governorate)
- Time zone: UTC+03:00 (SAST)
- Area code: 017

Al-Mandaq (Arabic: المندق, romanized: al-Mandaq) is a city and governorate in Al-Baha Province of Saudi Arabia. It is one of the administrative divisions of the province and includes several towns and villages.

== See also ==
- Provinces of Saudi Arabia
- List of governorates of Saudi Arabia
- List of cities and towns in Saudi Arabia
