= Raghadan Forest =

Forest in Saudi Arabia

Raghadan is a forest located in Al Bahah Region, Kingdom of Saudi Arabia. It is long known for its ancient market, which is held every Sunday (Sunday Market) and it is one of the famous and commonly-frequented markets in the region.

== Location ==
Raghadan Forest is in Al Bahah Region, located in the Southwest of Saudi Arabia (in the northern hemisphere, situated between latitude 19–30 degree). It is located on the highway between Al-Baha and Taif city. Raghadan Forest is positioned on a cliff overlooking King Fahad Aqaba in Albaha at a height exceeding 1700m, the village of Zarqa separates it from Albaha city. Raghadan is 4 km away from the center of Albaha. It is located in the center of a group of villages, benefiting from the transport infrastructure in the area.

== Festivals ==
Festivals that are ongoing during the summer:

- Activities of Al-Kadi Baha
- The international honey festival
- The southern dance festival
- The Baha summer festival
- The shopping bazaar festival
- Raghadan Islamic Forum
- Raghadan Youth Forum
- The international circus festival
- The festival of productive families

== Gallery ==
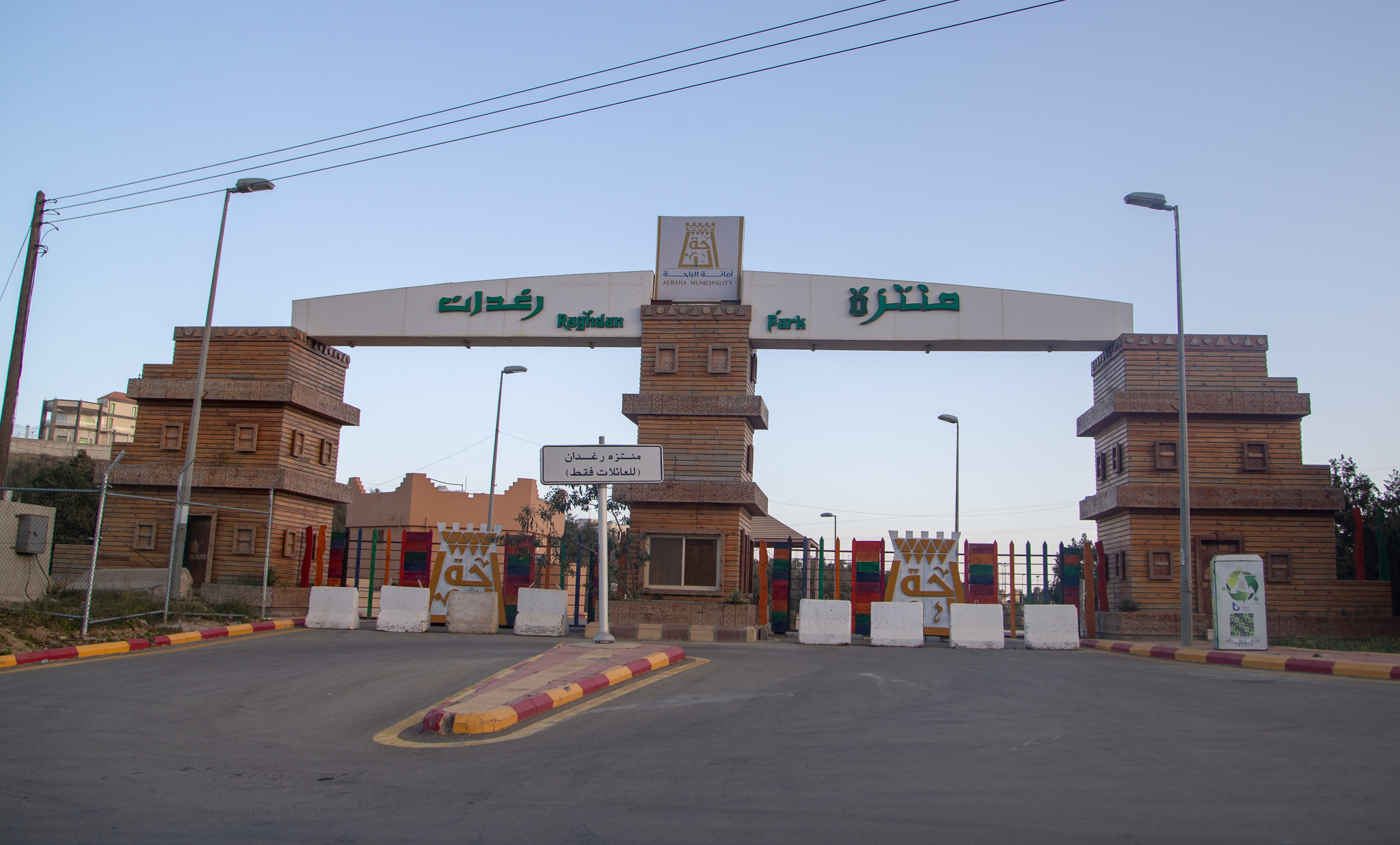
Raghadan Park entrance

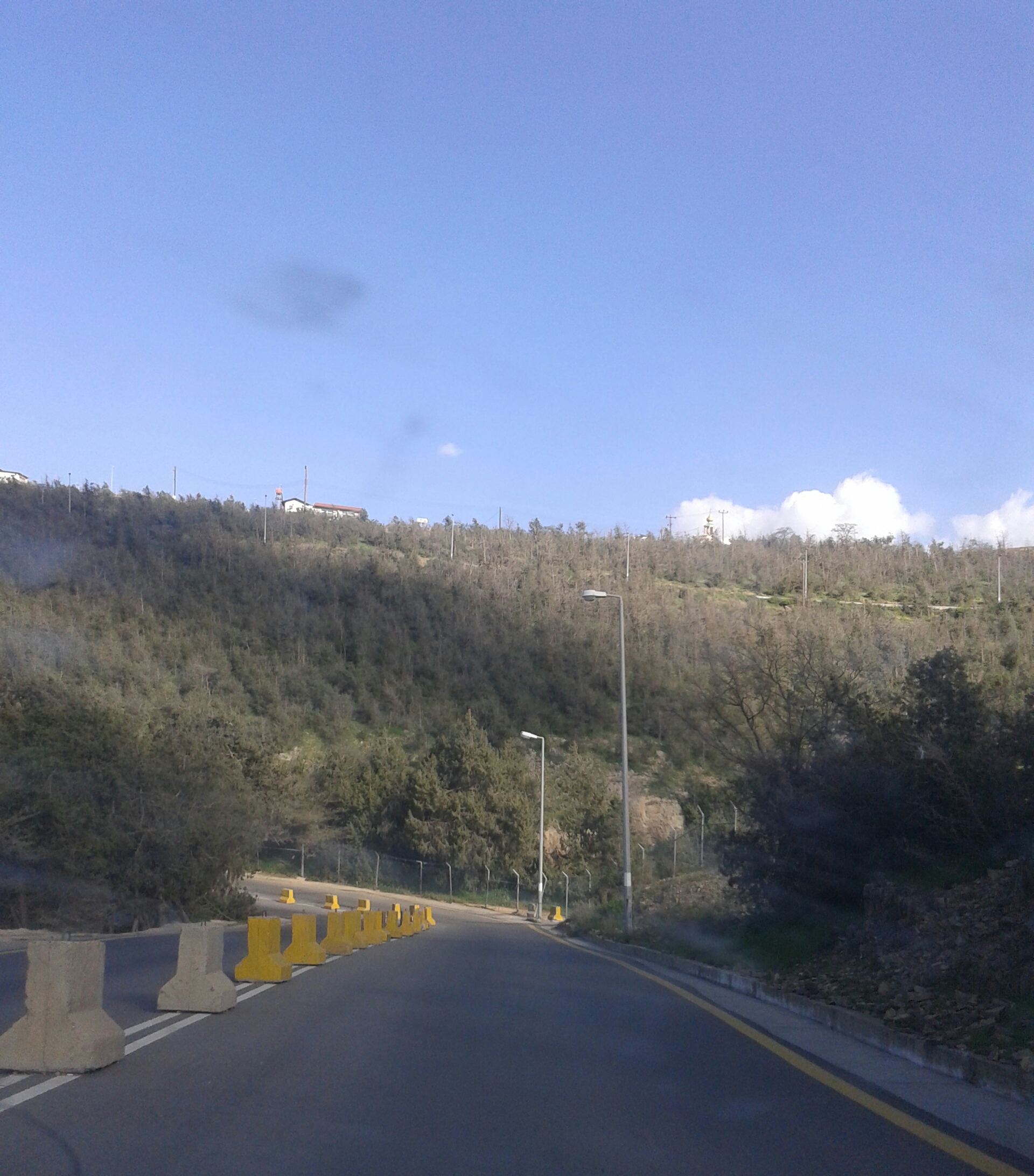

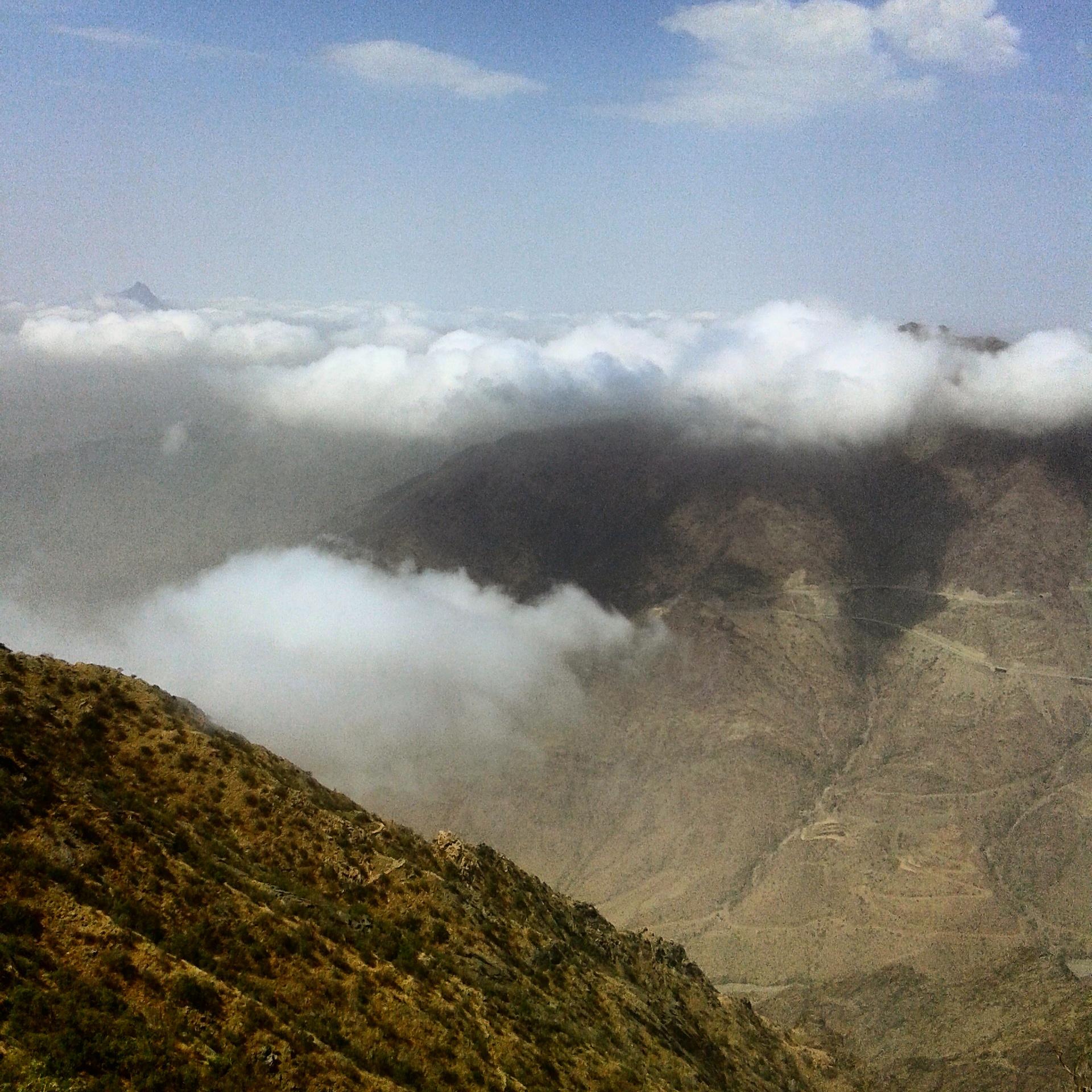
Top view of the forest

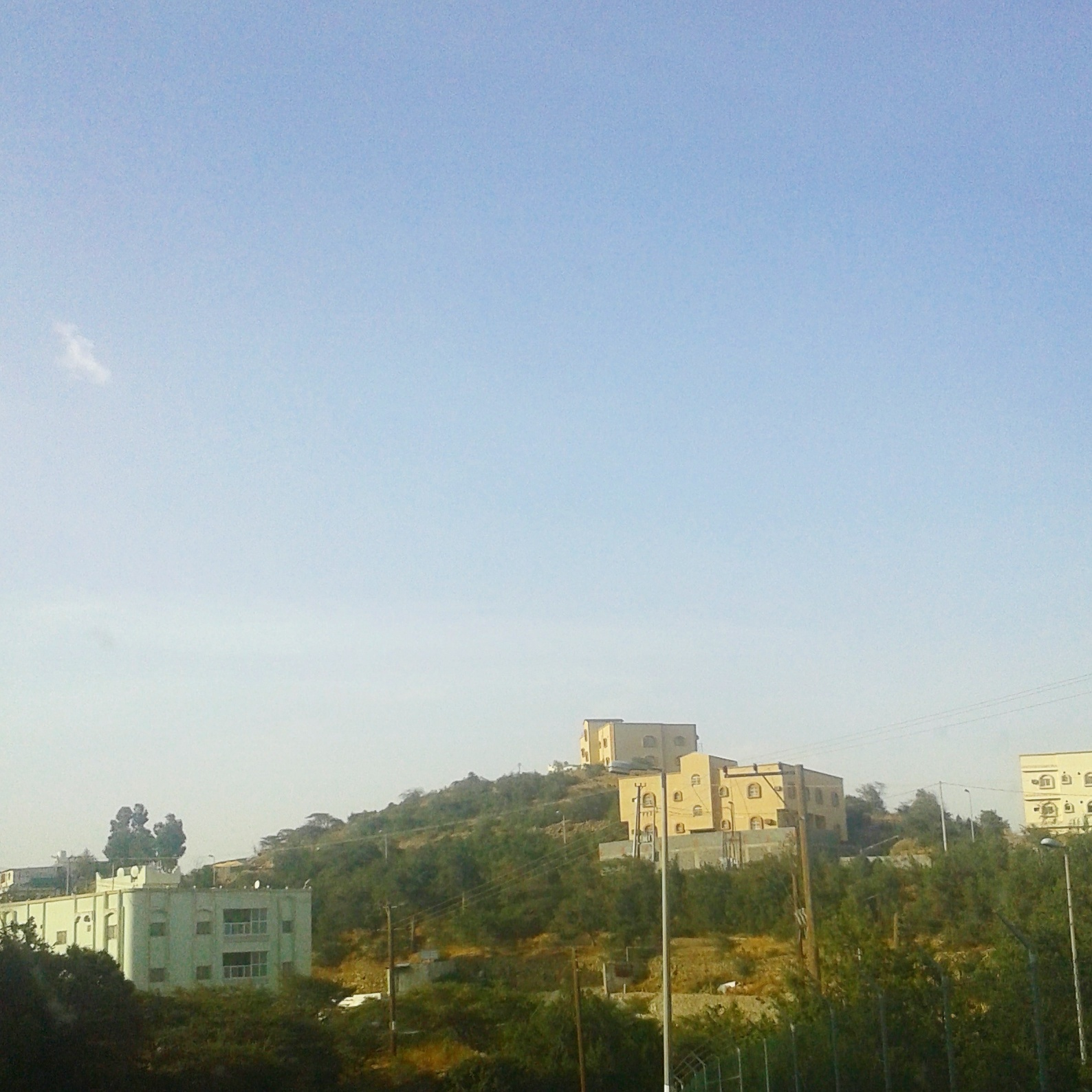

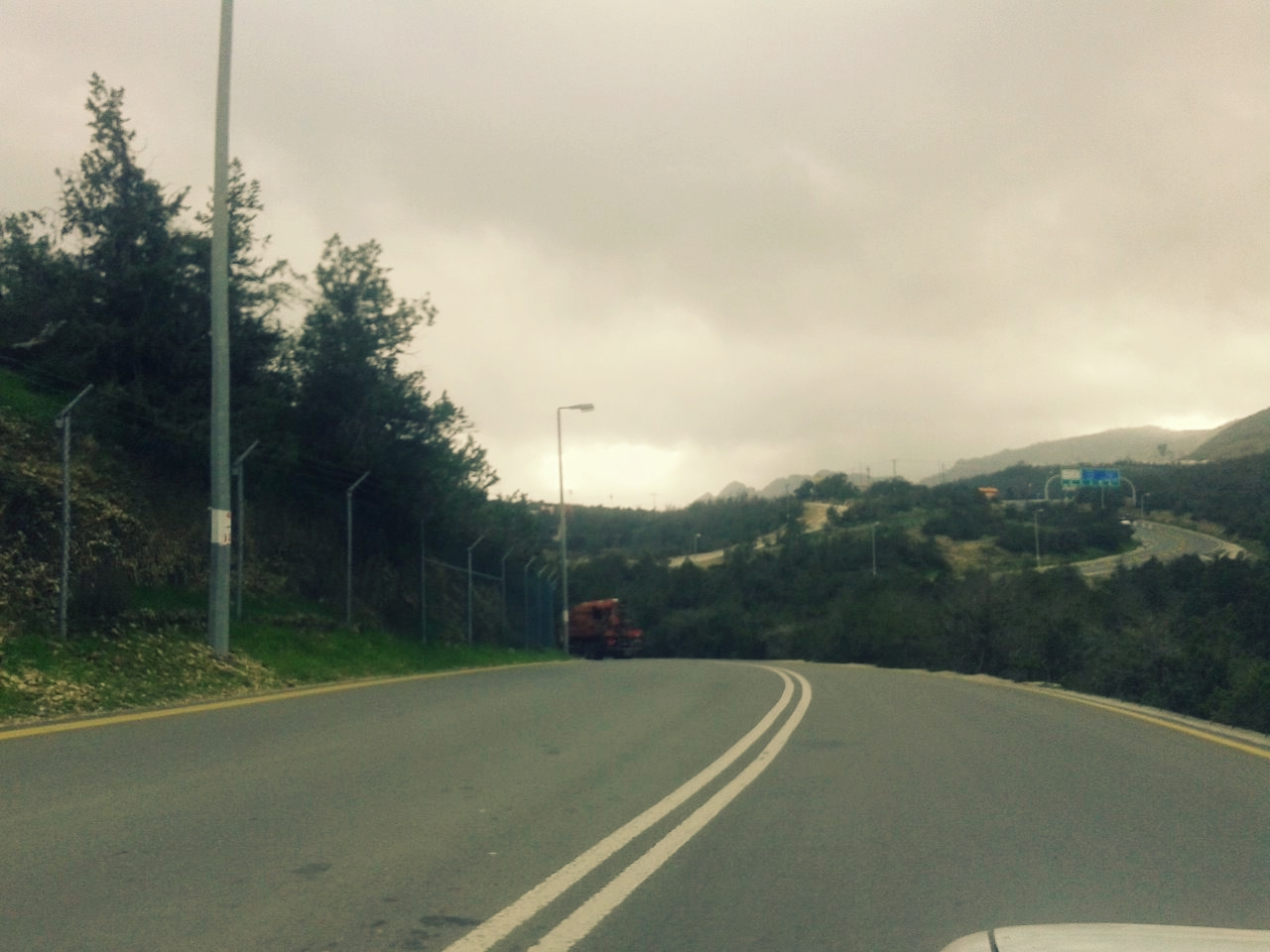
