= Al-Aqiq =

Al-Aqiq العقيق
- City and Governorate
- Location of Al-Aqiq within Al-Baha Province

- Location within Saudi Arabia
- Country: Saudi Arabia
- Province: Al-Baha Province
- Region: Hejaz

Government
  - Type: Municipality
  - Body: Al-Aqiq Municipality

Population (2022)
  - Metro: 37,608 (Al-Aqiq Governorate)
- Time zone: UTC+03:00 (SAST)
- Area code: 017

Al-Aqiq (Arabic: العقيق, romanized: al-‘Aqīq) is a city and governorate in Al-Baha Province of Saudi Arabia. It is the largest governorate by area in the province and includes several towns and villages.

== Transportation ==
=== Air ===
Al-Baha Province is served by King Saud Domestic Airport, located in Al-Aqiq, offering domestic flights only. For international travel, residents use nearby airports such as Abha International Airport, Taif International Airport, or King Abdulaziz International Airport in Jeddah.

== See also ==
- Provinces of Saudi Arabia
- List of governorates of Saudi Arabia
- List of cities and towns in Saudi Arabia
