= Al-Mikhwah =

Governorate of Saudi Arabia

Al-Mikhwah المخواة
- City and Governorate
- Location of Al-Mikhwah within Al-Baha Province

- Location within Saudi Arabia
- Coordinates: 19°47′N 41°26′E
- Country: Saudi Arabia
- Province: Al-Baha Province
- Region: Hejaz

Government
  - Type: Municipality
  - Body: Al-Mikhwah Municipality

Population (2022)
  - Metro: 48,333 (Al-Mikhwah Governorate)
- Time zone: UTC+03:00 (SAST)
- Area code: 017

Al-Mikhwah also spelled as Al-Makhwah (Arabic: المخواة, romanized: al-Mikhwāh) is a city and governorate in Al-Baha Province of Saudi Arabia. It is one of the administrative divisions of the province and includes several towns and villages.

== Sites ==
- Thee Ain
- Mount Shada

== Sport club ==
Al-Mikhwah Club is the main football club representing the Al-Mikhwah governorate.

== See also ==
- Provinces of Saudi Arabia
- List of governorates of Saudi Arabia
- List of cities and towns in Saudi Arabia
