= King Saud Domestic Airport =

King Saud Domestic Airport مطار الملك سعود المحلي
- IATA: ABT; ICAO: OEBA

Summary
- Airport type: Public
- Operator: General Authority of Civil Aviation
- Serves: Al-Baha Province
- Location: Al-Aqiq, Saudi Arabia
- Opened: 1 June 1983
- Elevation AMSL: 5,486 ft (1,672 m)
- Coordinates: 20°17′46″N 041°38′03″E

Map
- Location of airport in Saudi Arabia

Runways
| Direction | Length | | Surface |
| Direction | m | ft | Surface |
|---|---|---|---|
| 07/25 | 3,350 | 10,991 | Asphalt |

King Saud Domestic Airport (IATA: ABT, ICAO: OEBA) is an airport located in Al-Aqiq, serving Al-Baha Province in Saudi Arabia.

== Facilities ==
The airport resides at an elevation of 5,486 feet (1,672 m) above mean sea level. It has one runway designated 07/25 with an asphalt surface measuring 3,350 by 45 metres (10,991 ft × 148 ft).

== Airlines and destinations ==
| Airlines | Destinations |
|---|---|
| Flyadeal | Dammam |
| Flynas | Dammam, Riyadh |
| Saudia | Dammam, Jeddah, Riyadh |

== See also ==
- List of airports in Saudi Arabia
- General Authority of Civil Aviation
