= Amal Dunqul =

Egyptian poet

Mohammed Amal Faheem Muhareb Dunqul
- محمد أمل فهيم محارب دنقل
- Born: June 23, 1940; El-Qalaa, Qift, Qena Governorate, Egypt
- Died: May 21, 1983 (aged 42); Cairo, Egypt
- Other names: Prince of Refusers ("أمير شعراء الرفض")
- Occupation: Poet
- Notable work: The Last Words of Spartacus; Do Not Reconcile
- Spouse: Abla El-Rowainy

Amal Abul-Qassem Dunqul (Arabic: أمل دنقل, IPA: [ˈʔæmæl ˈdonʔol]; 23 June 1940 – 21 May 1983) was an Egyptian poet.

== Early life ==
Dunqul was born in El-Qala village in Qift, an administrative division of Qena Governorate on 23 June 1940. His father had gotten his Habilitation degree from al-Azhar University that same year, and so named him "Amal", meaning "Hope" in Arabic, despite it being a typically female name. Dunqul's father wrote Classical ("Vertical") Arabic poetry, and owned a large library of books in various Arabic literary traditions. He was a very strict parent, preventing his son from playing with other children. He died when Dunqul was ten years old, and at such an early age, Dunqul had to financially support his mother and two younger brothers, an experience which hardened him and shaped his infamously harsh personality.

In 1958, Dunqul enrolled in the Faculty of Arts at Cairo University. Before the end of his first year, he dropped out to work at the Qena Court of Justice, the Customs Departments in Suez and Alexandria and the Afro-Asian People's Solidarity Organization. He was raised in a very religious household, and thus was very devout. He later lost his deep devotion to religion and developed Marxist sympathies, reading the works of Marx, Engels, and Lenin, but never joined a political party due to his suspicion of all political organizations.

== Artistic career ==
Dunqul met his future wife, Egyptian journalist Abla El-Rowainy, after she decided to conduct a series of interviews with him for her newspaper, Akhbar el-Yom. However, the senior editors objected due to Dunqul's leftist views and his opposition to then-president Anwar Sadat.

It was October 1975 [...] An editor at Akhbar el-Yom told me:

“You'll find it difficult to publish your interview with him, Amal is a leftist poet, and the paper won't publish the interview. Perhaps we can publish it in our Arab edition outside Egypt, but never locally.”

[...]
I said: “I'll conduct the interview regardless!”
He laughed:

“Then beware of him, you'll find he has a lashing tongue, very ugly like all Communists, you'll smell that from afar!”

— Abla El-Rowainy, The Southerner, 1992

Dunqul would continue to find persistent difficulty in publishing his writings due to his political views.

El-Rowainy conducted several interviews with Dunqul. During the second interview (conducted at a bar over a bottle of beer, much to El-Rowainy's astonishment), he presented her with a brief "identity card".

My Identity Card
Name: Mohammed Amal Faheem Muhareb Dunqul
Occupation: Poet, albeit restricted by chance to be a mere amateur, since professionalism in poetry robs one of spontaneity and social experience.
Question at hand: The priority of Freedom, Right, and Beauty. Freedom takes priority because Right is bound by its achievement, and Beauty is bound by the achievement of Right.
Position: Not neutral, since a neutral poet is impotent, because neutrality kills ambition, and a poet is not a passive typewriter upon which the fingers of fate type.

Upon moving to Cairo, Dunqul cultivated friendships with Egypt's new generation of artists, especially with Abdel Rahman el-Abnudi and Yahya Taher Abdullah. Dunqul shared a room with the latter for a month which he would call later "The Month of Hell" due to Abdullah's chaotic personality, which clashed with Dunqul's love of silence. Despite this, the two remained close friends. Upon Dunqul's cancer diagnosis and surgery in 1979, Abdullah visited Dunqul in the hospital, asking El-Rowainy “Why should people like Amal die while the bastards remain alive?” and promptly running out of the room, crying. Abdullah would predecease Dunqul by two years due to a car accident. Dunqul refused to attend his funeral, saying that he wanted to grieve for him in private.

Dunqul had a tenuous friendship with fellow poet Naguib Surur, with whom he would quarrel constantly. On one occasion, an argument between them escalated to blows, and despite that, they drank together in the evening at a highbrow bar. A similar uneasy friendship existed between him and Safinaz Kazem, who accused him of ruining her projects. El-Rowainy claims that Kazem once threw a cup of hot tea at Dunqul in frustration. A less turbulent friendship existed between Dunqul and the Palestinian poet Ahmad Dahboor. When Dunqul unexpectedly attended a poetry festival in Beirut in 1981, Dahboor was overjoyed to see him.

Dunqul's caustic personality and sharp tongue became notorious. Fellow poet Badr Tawfiq wrote in his obituary:

Amal made himself the mayor of Cairo. He knew everything that went on, marriages, divorces, lawsuits, debts, profits, travels, strengths and weaknesses, dreams and ambitions [...] and he would use that knowledge to attack his rivals. He went too far with this behavior and became notorious for being aggressive and injurious, and so his friends fled from around him in fear.

El-Rowainy disputes this characterization, claiming that Dunqul was a scrupulously honest man who hated mincing words and fake courtesy.

Crying in Front of Zarqa al Yamama (Arabic: البكاء بين يدي زرقاء اليمامة), Dunqul's first poetry collection, was published by Suhayl Idris, the Lebanese editor-in-chief of Al Adab. Idris would go on to publish and defend many of Dunqul's most controversial poems, including The Stone Cake (Arabic: الكعكة الحجرية), which was written in praise of the 1977 Egyptian bread riots against President Sadat. When asked, Idris would reply: “If the poet was brave enough to write such a poem, would it be too brave for me to publish it?” Due to Dunqul's reputation as a fighter who courted political controversy as well as his frequent usage of themes from Greek mythology and history, he was nicknamed "Hercules" by critic Hasan Tawfiq and "Spartacus" by the future Egyptian Minister of Culture Gaber Asfour.

El-Rowainy relates that during her and Dunqul's wedding, he absentmindedly called a taxi instead of taking the ornate, flower-covered limousine that traditionally would take the bride and groom to their home. Their marriage was troubled and yet passionate, ever plagued by Dunqul's alcohol habit. The day after the wedding, which the couple would traditionally spend together at home, he disappeared in the morning and returned at 8 p.m. after spending his time with friends at a bar, toasting to the groom, much to his newlywed wife's chagrin.

Dunqul was present at the meeting at Ahmed Hijazi's home on August 15, 1981, where Bahgat Osman's harsh criticism of Salah Abdulsaboor caused the latter a fatal heart attack. Osman said: “You sold out, you sold out for a millieme!” (Note: A millieme is 1/1000 of an Egyptian Pound, an infinitesimal amount even when accounting for inflation.) an insult upon which Abdulsaboor was so agitated as to trigger a heart attack which killed him the same night.

== Illness and death ==
Dunqul was diagnosed with lung cancer in September 1979, only 9 months after his wedding. He refused to quit smoking despite his doctor's remonstrances. He had surgery soon after, but a second tumor emerged in March 1980. In February 1982, Dunqul was admitted to room #8 at the National Cancer Institute in Cairo where he would spend the last year and a half of his life with his wife. The couple decorated the room with newspaper clippings of Dunqul's poems and, among other things, a get-well-soon card from Yasser Arafat and a portrait of their recently deceased friend Yahya Taher Abdullah. The room would become a meeting place of Cairo's intelligentsia, hosting more than a 20 visitors a day, and after Doha magazine published the room's address, hundreds of letters arrived daily from all over the Arab world. An editorial by Yusuf Idris appeared in Al-Ahram, titled "By God, Amal, do not die!" and an unsuccessful campaign was mounted to have the government cover Dunqul's treatment costs.

Room #8 saw the writing of Dunqul's last 6 poems, which were posthumously published in the collection Papers of Room #8 (Arabic: أوراق الغرفة 8). They are, in chronological order:

- Against Whom? (Arabic: ضد من؟)
- Flowers (Arabic: زهور)
- Endgame (Arabic: لعبة النهاية)
- The Horses (Arabic: الخيول)
- The Bed (Arabic: السرير)
- The Southerner (Arabic: الجنوبي)

While Dunqul initially showed promising signs of recovery in response to radiotherapy, he suffered from sudden kidney failure and uremia, and his health started to decline dramatically. He quickly became bedridden and unable to turn in bed. He entered an intermittent coma shortly after. He died on May 21, 1983, at age 42 upon asking for the glucose drip to be stopped. His last spoken words were to Nasser al-Khateeb, the branch manager of Al Riyadh newspaper in Cairo, who asked Dunqul to “Please resist, Amal!” Dunqul replied: “All I can do is resist.”

== Legacy ==
Abla El-Rowainy would go on to write her husband's posthumous biography in 1992, The Southerner (Arabic: الجنوبي), named so after his last poem and due to Dunqul's Sa'idi background, having been born and raised in Upper Egypt.

In 1990, Egyptian filmmaker Ateyyat El-Abnoudy, Abdulrahman El-Abnoudy's wife, produced and directed Memories of Room #8, a documentary about Dunqul's life. The documentary included interview footage with Dunqul telling the story of his childhood, as well as interviews with his mother.

Dunqul's popularity and works saw a revival upon the Egyptian Revolution of 2011 alongside other leftist poets and songwriters such as Ahmed Fouad Negm, with excerpts of his poems being shared widely on social media as well as appearing in numerous graffiti. Do Not Reconcile particularly saw a surge of popularity, being applied to resistance against military rule in addition to its original anti-Israel meaning.

An event was held on May 24, 2013, to commemorate the 30th anniversary of Dunqul's death, organized by Abla El-Rowainy. In attendance was poet Shaban Yusuf.

== Poetry ==
Dunqul's style was influenced by Greek mythology as well as pre-Islamic and Islamic imagery. He wrote Arabic poetry mostly in free verse (Arabic: شعر حر).

Dunqul published six poetry collections:

- Crying in Front of Zarqa al Yamama (Arabic: البكاء بين يدي زرقاء اليمامة) (1969)
- Comments on What Has Happened (Arabic: تعليق على ما حدث) (1971)
- The Death of the Moon (Arabic: مقتل القمر) (1974)
- The Next Testament (Arabic: العهد الآتي) (1975)
- New Sayings on the Basus War (Arabic: أقوال جديدة عن حرب البسوس) (1983)
- Papers of Room #8 (Arabic: أوراق الغرفة 8) (1983)

Some of his most famous poems include The Last Words of Spartacus (Arabic: كلمات سبارتكوس الأخيرة), which starts:

المجد للشيطان ... معبود الرياح
من قال لا في وجه من قالوا نعم
من علم الانسان تمزيق العدم
من قال لا ... فلم يمت
وظل روحا أبدية الألم
Glory to Satan, God of the wind
He who said "No" in the face of those who said "Yes"
He who taught Man how to smash oblivion
He who said "No", and so never died
And became an eternal soul, tortured forever

The poem alludes to the refusal of Satan to prostrate himself before Adam in Islamic tradition. Another widely-circulated poem is Do Not Reconcile (Arabic: لا تصالح), which starts:

لا تصالح
ولو منحوك الذهب
أترى حين أفقأ عينيك
ثم أثبت جوهرتين مكانهما
هل ترى؟
هي أشياء لا تشترى
Do not reconcile
Even if they gave you gold
If I poke out your eyes
And put jewels in their place
Do you see again?
Some things can't be bought!

This poem was written in the context of the Israeli-Arab conflict, and contains a refusal to reconcile with Israel, which earned him the moniker "Prince of Refusers" (Arabic: أمير شعراء الرفض). The poem spread across the Arab world as a refusal of the Camp David peace treaty with Israel, signed by Egyptian President Sadat.

A further example of the theme of refusal in Dunqul's poetry comes from An Exclusive Interview with the Son of Noah (Arabic: مقابلة خاصة مع ابن نوح), which is written from the perspective of Noah's fourth son Yam who, in Islamic tradition, refused to board Noah's Ark and so drowned as a disbeliever.

كان قلبي الذي نسجته الجروح
كان قلبي الذي لعنته الشروح
يرقد الآن فوق بقايا المدينة
وردة من عطن
هادئا
بعد أن قال لا للسفينة
و أحب الوطن
My heart, crossed by wounds
My heart, filled with scars
Lay now over the ruins of the city
A flower, injured
And yet, calm
After it said "No" to the Ark
And loved its homeland.

This was considered deeply blasphemous, since it portrayed a traditionally rebellious disbeliever punished by God as a brave, principled man who refused to leave his homeland.

It was confirmed by Dunqul's brother Anas that there exist works that are yet unpublished, including two poetic plays titled The Error (Arabic: الخطأ) and al-Hakim bi-Amr Allah (Arabic: الحاكم بأمر الله) in addition to 20 or so romantic poems.

== Bibliography ==
- Dunqul, Amal (1969). البكاء بين يدي زرقاء اليمامة [Crying in Front of Zarqa al Yamama] (in Arabic). Dār al-Ādāb. OCLC 17957756.
- Dunqul, Amal (1971). تعليق على ما حدث [Comments on What Has Happened] (in Arabic). Dar al-Awda. OCLC 4770920162.
- Dunqul, Amal (1974). مقتل القمر [The Death of the Moon] (in Arabic). Dar al-Awda. OCLC 4770714897.
- Dunqul, Amal (1975). العهد الآتي [The Next Testament] (in Arabic). Dar al-Awda. OCLC 4770539783.
- Dunqul, Amal (1983). أقوال جديدة عن حرب البسوس [New Sayings on the Basus War] (in Arabic). Dar al-Mustaqbal. OCLC 4771155112.
- Dunqul, Amal (1983). أوراق الغرفة 8 [Papers of Room #8] (in Arabic). General Egyptian Book Organization. OCLC 4771091152.
