= Shaban Yusuf =

Egyptian writer

- Born: 7 April 1955 (age 71); Egypt
- Education: Bachelor's degree in commerce
- Occupations: Writer, editor-in-chief, television presenter, television producer
- Writing career
- Language: Arabic
- Genres: Poetry collections, novel, literary articles, play, criticism, research

Shaban Yusuf (Arabic: شعبان يوسف; born 7 April 1955) is an Egyptian writer, poet, critic and researcher. He is the founder of Olive Literary Workshop forum and Kitabat magazine. He published seven poetry collections, a play, critical books and research papers. He was the editor-in-chief of Kitabat Jadidah series, and the supervisor of Manarat al-Nadim literary magazine. He also wrote for a number of newspapers, including El Tahrir and Akhbar Al-Adab newspapers. Yusuf is known for his pursuit to bring marginalized poets and female authors to light. Additionally, he contributed in the field of media production by helping prepare and present television programs, such as Assir Al-Kotob, Soor Elazbakeya and Al-Maqha Al-Thaqafi. Yusuf is currently working as the editor-in-chief for Alam Al-Kotob magazine, and on publishing a new book, titled "Mustafa Mahmoud's Broken Secularism."

== Education ==
Yusuf completed his elementary education at Mostafa Hafez Primary School, and graduated from the College of Commerce.

== Personal life ==
Yusuf discovered his passion for writing in his elementary level. It all started when he began to read. He chose "Robin Hood" as his the first novel, which he read around 10 times, for its level was categorized as advanced like that of known international books, such as "Arsène Lupin, Gentleman Burglar." His science teacher, Hosni Al-Abbasi, who was also a librarian at his primary school, played a prominent role in encouraging Yusuf to read, and, consequently, discover new realms.

During his secondary level of education, Yusuf was introduced to poetry by one of his friends. His friend's father then taught Yusuf about prosody, rhythm and metrical foot. Yusuf learned about a lot of poets, but was emotionally affected by Hafiz Ibrahim the most, and took a liking to a lot of his works.

== Career ==
Yusuf first contribution ever in the work field was taking part in the student movement in the 1970s.

In 1979, Yusuf founded Olive Literary Workshop forum, which presents the works of talented, creative Egyptian writers specialized in the field of literature, without restriction to a specific literary movement. For 30 years, the forum strived to increase the recognition of these authors and enrich the cultural movement in Egypt. In the same year, and in collaboration with the poets, Rifat Salam and Mahmoud Naseem, Yusuf founded Kitabat magazine. In 1980, he worked in one of the libraries located in Soor Elazbakeya (meaning the fence of Azbakeya) for a year. He later gave an account of his experiences in the library and was broadcast in an Episode of Soor Elazbakeya program on Al Araby channel, which he helped produce.

His continued to devote his efforts to the field of literature in the 21st century. Firstly, he was appointed editor-in-chief of Kitabat Jadidah series, which is issued by the General Egyptian Book Authority, from the year 2011 to 2016. Secondly, and during the same period, namely from the year 2013 to 2015, he wrote for El Tahrir newspaper, in which he was assigned to publish a weekly article. Thirdly, he was appointed as the supervisor of Manarat Al-Nadim, through which he learned about sociology and youth innovations. Lastly, he wrote for Akhbar Al-Adab newspaper, and continues to fill this post until the current period.

Throughout his career as a poet, Yusuf published seven poetry collections and a play. However, and as a result of witnessing the poorly-composed poetry by his generation, Yusuf decided to research about the different elements of poetry in an attempt to cultivate it. Through his research, he discovered talented, but marginalized, poets, and uncovered creative aspects of a cultural life. Yusuf then decided to specialize in critical writing and conducting research, for the purpose of validating the elements of poetry, as well as demarginalize poets. Moreover, he managed to free women writers from the claws of intentional exclusion caused by the Egyptian society. He composed "Why do women writers die in vain?" in hopes to shed more light on the works of women writers, and encourage women writers to have their own voice in the society and openly express their views. At the start of 2020, Yusuf became one of the 100 poets and critics, coming from 15 Arab countries, who participated in the 5th Cairo International Forum on Arab Poetry organized by the Supreme Council Of Culture. In June of the same year, Yusuf took part in The Culture within your Hands initiative, which was launched by the Supreme Council Of Culture, in which he presented a reading of a section of his book "Why do women writers die in vain?" as part of Read with Us series. The reading was recorded by officials from the Supreme Council Of Culture, and uploaded as a video on Facebook and YouTube, and Yusuf interacted with his followers' activity.

From among the many books he published, Yusuf re-published novels about prominent writers, including Shuhdi Atiya ash-Shafi, Sayyid Qutb, Nabawiyya Musa and Ismail Adham.

Yusuf also contributed in the field of media production by helping prepare and present television programs. In collaboration with the scriptwriter and author, Belal Fadl, Yusuf produced Assir Al-Kotob, which was broadcast on Dream tv channel. He, too, worked alongside the production team that produced the cultural program of the Cairo International Book Fair, as well as he assisted in the organization of the activities that were held at the fair. Lastly, he produced Al-Maqha Al-Thaqafi television program.

Furthermore, Yusuf attended a number of conferences held locally and internationally, such as Muscat International Book Fair.

Currently, Yusuf is holding the position of editor-in-chief of Alam Al-Kotob magazine issued by the General Egyptian Book Authority. He is also working on composing a new book, under the title "Mustafa Mahmoud's Broken Secularism," in which he accounts the radical changes Mustafa Mahmoud was exposed during his intellectual journey.

== Works ==
=== Poetry collections ===
- "A Fixed Seat in the Wind" (original title: Maq'ad Thabit fi-l Reeh), Dar Sina, Cairo, 1993.
- "Muwidat" (as its original title), Dar Al-Nadim for Press and Publication, Cairo, 1994.
- "As if it was Only Yesterday" (original title: Ka'anah-u Bi-l Ams Faqat), 1998.
- "Who She appears in my Dreams a Lot" (original title: Tazahar Fi Manami Kathira), Kotob Arabia, Amman, 1999.
- "1999" Poetry Collection (original title: Diwan 1999), General Egyptian Book Authority, Cairo, 2002.
- "More than One Cause for Isolation" (original title: Akthar Min sabab Li-l-Ezla), Kotob Arabia, Amman, 2002.
- "Shakespearean Dreams" (original title: Ahlam Shakespeariyah), Haven for Translation and Publishing, Cairo, 2008.

=== Plays ===
- "A Beam of Light Falls into the Dark" (original title: Buq'at Daw' Tasqut Muzlimah), Supreme Council Of Culture, Cairo.

=== Critical books ===
- "Poets of the 1970s: Their Biography, Generation and Movement" (original title: Shu'ara' Al-Sabeinat..Al-Sirah..Al-Jeel..Al-Harakah), the Supreme Council for Culture, Cairo, 2003.
- "A Noble Writer's Isolation" (original title: Khuluat Al-Katib Al-Nabil), General Authority for Cultural Palaces, Cairo, 2012. Yusef dedicates this book to the renowned Ibrahim Aslan.
- "Why do women writers die in vain?" (original title: Limaza Tamut-u Al-Katibat Kamada?), Battana Publishing and Distribution, Cairo, 2016. Yusuf combines the findings of his research about marginalized women writers in this book, in hopes to achieve social justice and democracy.
- "The Victims of Yusuf Idris and his Era" (original title: Dahaya Yusuf Idris W-Asruh-u), Battana Publishing and Distribution, Cairo, 2017.
- "Fouda's Cry of Relief" (original title: Sirkhat Firj Fawdah), Battana Publishing and Distribution, Cairo, 2017. This book was composed in collaboration with Dr. Azza Kamel.
- "The Rise of the Forgotten" (original title: Al-Mansiyun Yanhadun), Battana Publishing and Distribution, Cairo, 2017.
- "An Anonymous Diary: Naguib el-Rihani" (original title: Naguib el-Rihani..Al-Mudhakarat Al-Majhulah), Battana Publishing and Distribution, Cairo, 2017.

=== Other contributions ===
- "Mustafa Mahmoud's Broken Secularism" (original title: Ilmaniyat Mustafa Mahmoud Al-Munkasirah), Ibn Rushd Publishing House, Cairo, 2020. The book details the signs of Mustafa Mahmoud's rebellious attitude, which was initially hinted in his book "Eating Bread" (original title: Akl 'Aysh) that was published in 1955. Mahmoud learned a lot from his post as a writer to Rose al-Yūsuf magazine. Firstly, he managed to develop his technical tools, and, hence, improve his literary articles. Secondly, he used his post as means to exhibit his rebellious thoughts in writing. Fortunately, his writings were embraced by the public, and gained recognition on the local and international levels. In the book, Yusuf gives an account of all the authors whose notions influenced Mahmoud's writings, most notably Ali Abdel Raziq's "Islam and the Foundations of Governance" (1925) (original title: Al-Islam Wa Usul Al-Hukm), and Sheikh Khaled Muhammad Khaled's "The Starting Point" (1950) (original title: Min Huna Nabda').
