= Younan Labib Rizk =

Egyptian journalist and professor of history (1933–2008)

Younan Labib Rizk Arabic: يونان لبيب رزق
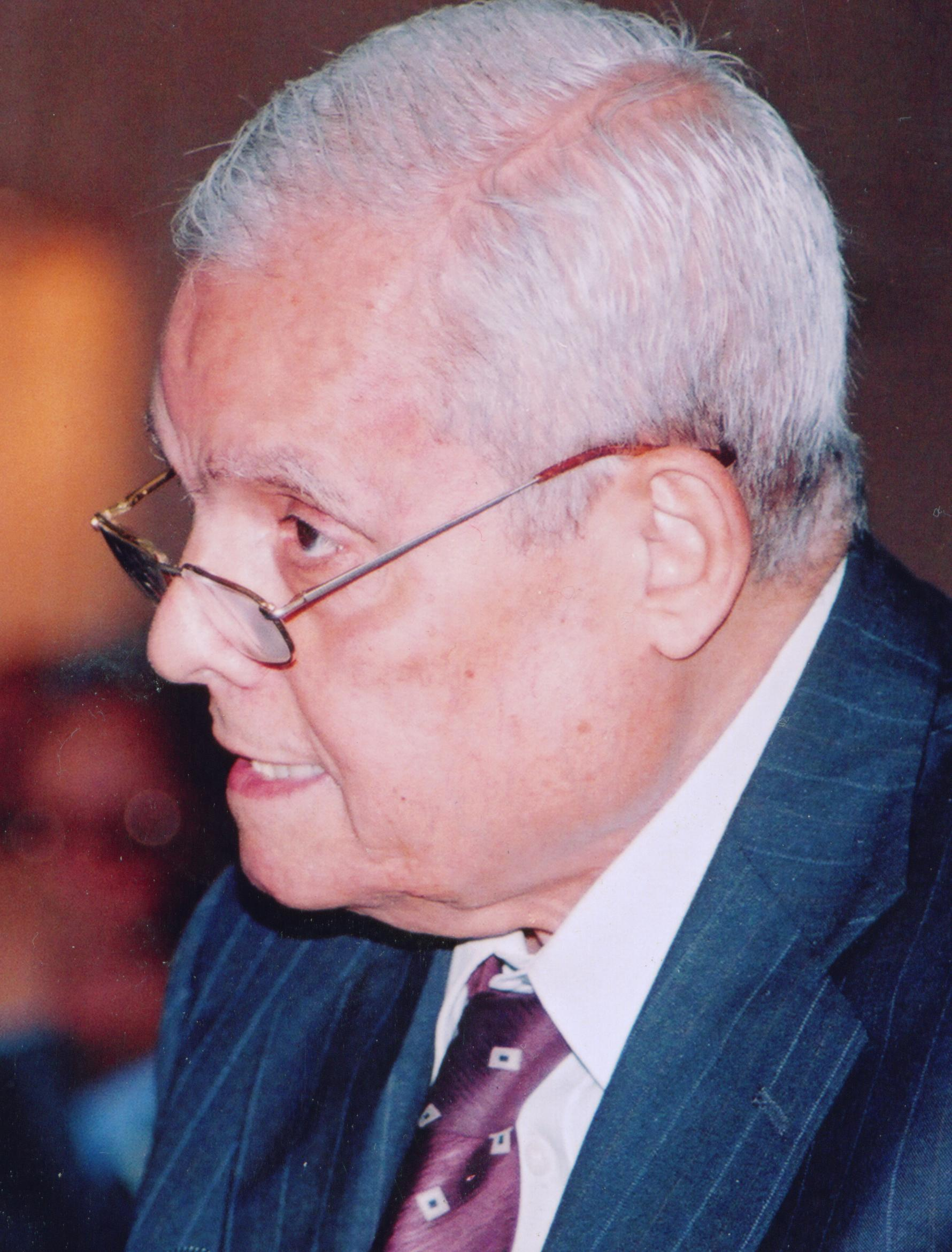
- Born: 27 October 1933
- Died: 14 January 2008 (aged 74); Cairo
- Education: Bachelor’s degree in Literature from Ain Shams University
- Occupations: journalist, writer, historian, director

Younan Labib Rizk (27 October 1933 – 14 January 2008) was a prominent Egyptian historian and literary figure. He was a professor of history at Ain Shams University in Cairo; and was also appointed a member of the History Committee of the Supreme Council for Culture. He was formerly Director of Historical Studies at the Institute of Research and Arab Studies. Rizk was a prolific writer with a weekly column appearing in Al-Ahram newspaper where he founded and headed the History Studies Centre. He was the author of several esteemed publications which rendered him an authority on Modern History, which was the subject of his MA and PhD degrees in 1963 and 1967 respectively. Rizk received numerous awards and medals, including State Incentive Award in Social Sciences in 1995. On the national level, he played a significant role in the dispute over Taba with Israel in 1986–88. The issue was subject to international arbitration and was ruled in Egypt's favor.

== Early life and education ==
Rizk was born into a middle-class family and lived his childhood in a popular district in Cairo "Azbakeya" in a house built by his grandfather, Rizk Bek Ibrahim, in 1912. After his retirement as chief of Azbakeya police force, his grandfather bought a farm in Kafr El-Sheikh, where Rizk used to spend all his summers with his cousins. Orphaned at six, when his father died after a brief illness and was shortly followed by his grandfather, Rizk had to endure a strict discipline imposed by his mother, who was left on her own to take care of the family. Such an environment was most likely a pushing force that led him early in his life to discover Soor Elazbakeya (the fence of Azbakeya) which is known as a major used books market where Rizk used to spend hours and hours to satisfy his passion for reading.

After some hesitation following his graduation from high school, Rizk joined the Faculty of Science at Ibrahim Pasha's University, which was the name of Ain Shams University when it was first established. Later and following his passion, he changed his major to humanities at the same university with a concentration in History. He obtained his BA in history in 1955. At first, Rizk was looking into a career in journalism; however, he ended up taking a job as a high school teacher in Ismailia where he remained until 1959, when he moved back to Cairo to work in Khalil Agha High School for the following six years. During this period, he finished his MA degree in 1963 in Sudan Modern History and, four years later in 1967, he obtained his PhD degree. Rizk progressed into his academic career until he became a professor of Modern History at Ain Shams University in 1979.

== National Role ==
During the years 1986 to 1988, Rizk was appointed by the Egyptian Ministry of Foreign Affairs as a member in the negotiation team over Taba with Israel, with the responsibility of identifying the historical evidence which supports Egypt's right to Taba. Rizk prepared the historical chapters in the legal documentation, which played a significant role in the international arbitration process in 1988. Rizk recorded his experience in his book "Taba" issued in 1989 and he also participated in the preparation of "the White Book" issued by the Ministry of Foreign Affairs on Taba.

Rizk also participated in the negotiation with the Sudanese Team over Hala'ib during the years 1992–1993.

He was appointed as a member of the Shura Council for two consecutive periods in 1995 and 2001.

== Works ==
- Party Life in Egypt under the British Occupation 1882-1914, 1970
- Press Freedom in Egypt 1798-1924, 1973
- Sudan in the Egyptian-British Negotiations 1930-1936, 1974
- The Unity of the Nile Delta between the Treaty and Changing the Colonial Existence, 1975
- The History of the Egyptian Ministries 1878-1953, 1975
- Sudan under the First Dual Government 1899-1924, 1975
- Egyptian Parties pre the 1952 Revolution, 1977
- Egyptian-African Relations, 1977
- The Wafd and the Black Book, 1978
- The Problem of the Sudanese South, 1981
- The Historical Origins of the Taba Case, 1983
- The History of the Egyptian Parties 1907-1984, 1984
- Egypt Foreign Affairs Ministry 1826-1937, 1989
- Taba, 1989
- The Story of the Egyptian Parliament, 1991
- Historical Readings on the Gulf War, 1991
- Arabic-Turkish Relations, 1991
- Civil Egypt - Chapters in Origin and Development, 1993
