= Al-Thakera Publishing House =

Arabic publishing house

Al-Thakera Publishing House دار الذاكرة للنشر والتوزيع
- Founded: 2001 (24 years ago)
- Country of origin: Iraq
- Publication types: Books
- Owner(s): Dr. Issam Al-Kawaz
- Official website: Al-Thakera Publishing House

Al-Thakera Publishing House (Arabic: دار الذاكرة للنشر والتوزيع) is an Iraqi publishing house established in 2001. The house has published many literary publications, books and Arabic novels, and has participated in many local and international book fairs.

== History ==
Al-Thakera Publishing House was founded in Baghdad by Dr. Issam Al-Kawaz in 2001. Before that, it was a library before it was transformed in the same year into an official Iraqi publishing house serving literary and political issues, biographies, memoirs, history books, philosophy, social sciences, religion, national thought, art illustrated books and children's books. It has a wide distribution network and agents in most parts of the world, and several offices in Baghdad, Amman, Cairo and Beirut. It also has a lot of training programs and cultural workshops in cooperation with Kasha Company and Academia Library Development Company in Jordan and the Library Association in Lebanon.

The house has published many literary publications, books and Arabic novels, and has also participated in many local and international book fairs. The publications of the house vary and cover different topics, on top of which is history. The house has published various works in different fields, including: Critical studies, Religious books, Poetry, trips ethics, Anecdotal collections, Novels (historical - social - detective - philosophical - psychological horror), Children's books, Articles and Thoughts and Marketing.

In 2018, Al-Thakera Publishing House was longlisted for International Prize for Arabic Fiction, through the novel "Mohammed's Brothers" by Maysalun Hadi.

== Cultural activities ==
Al-Thakera Publishing House was participated in many book fairs like: Cairo International Book Fair, Baghdad Book Fair, Riyadh International Book Fair and Sharjah International Book Fair.

== Authors ==
Al-Thakera Publishing House has published the works of many well-known contemporary authors:

- Maysalun Hadi
- Hadia Hussein
- Munqith Dagher
- Safwa Fahim
- Emad Abboud Abbas
