= Hadia =

Hadia may refer to:

- Handia (drink), a rice beer popular in Northern India
- Hadia (name), list of people with the name
