= Al-Jawhara bint Fahd bin Khalid Al Saud =

Al-Jawhara bint Fahd bin Khalid Al Saud (Arabic: الجوهرة بنت فهد بن خالد آل سعود) is a Saudi academic who was appointed as a member of the Saudi Shura Council in its eighth session in the year 1442 AH (2020) and the ninth session in 1446 AH (2024). She has received several awards, including Riyadh International Book Fair for 2020 in the Social Sciences category.

== Education ==
- PhD in Educational Foundations (or Principles of Education)
- Master of Arts (MA) in Counseling Psychology
- Bachelor's degree in Early Childhood Education (or Pre-Primary Education)

== Career ==
- Member of the Saudi Shura Council (eighth session).
- Associate Professor at King Saud University.
- Head of the Early Childhood Department at the College of Education at King Saud University.
- Vice Dean of Skills Development at King Saud University.
- Part-time consultant at the Ministry of Interior (Center for Research and Crime).
- Deputy Director of the Educational Policies Department at King Saud University.

== Awards ==
- She received the Prince Nayef bin Abdulaziz Award for Security Research of the Cooperation Council in 2017.
- She won the Riyadh International Book Fair Award 2020 in the Social Sciences track for her book (Introduction to the Montessori Approach).
