= Al-Kikhya Mosque =

Mosque in Cairo, Egypt

Uthman Katkhuda Mosque
- مسجد عثمان كتخدا
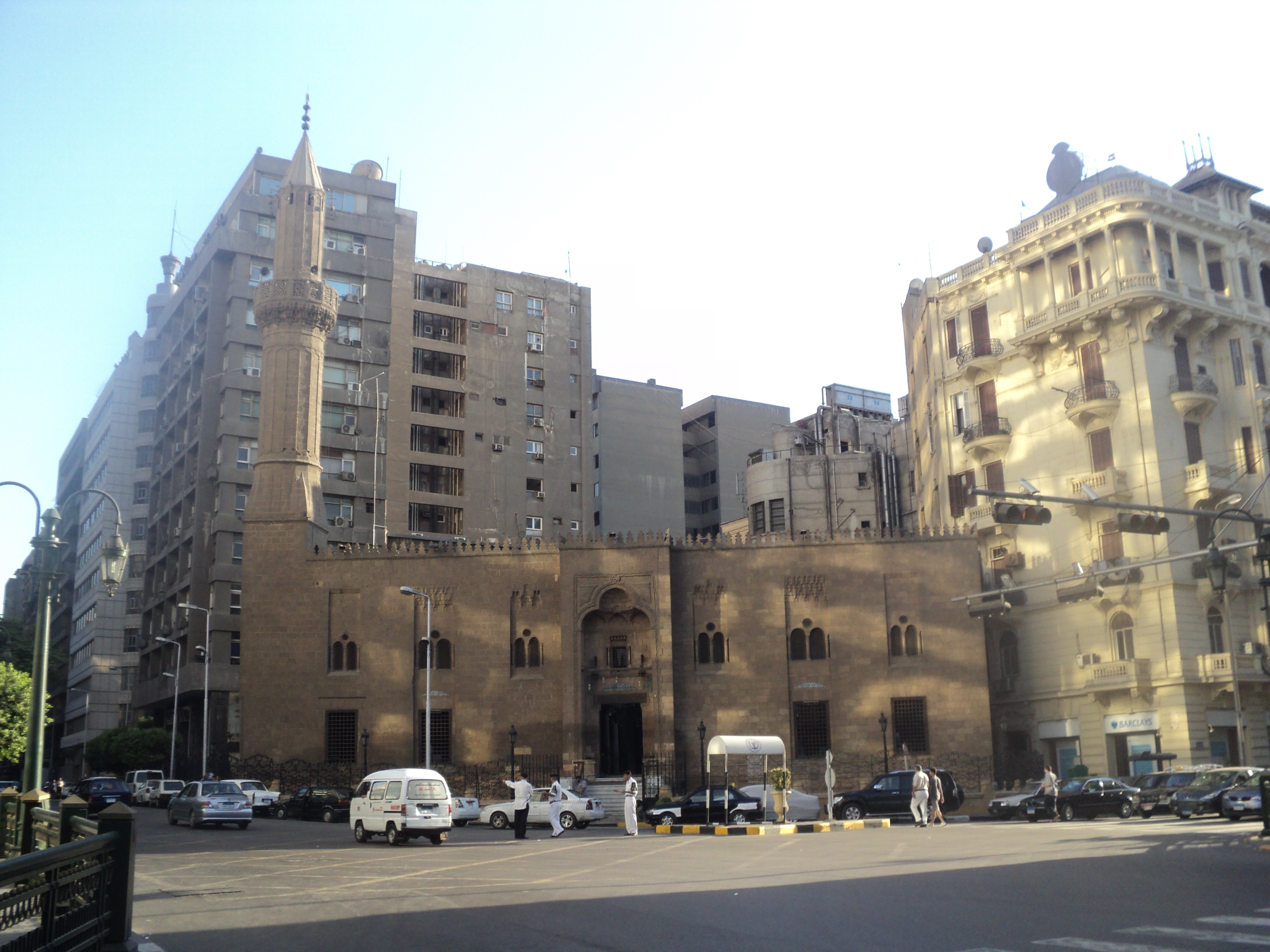

Religion
- Affiliation: Islam
- Ecclesiastical or organisational status: Mosque and mausoleum
- Status: Active

Location
- Location: Azbakeya, Cairo
- Country: Egypt
- Interactive map of Uthman Katkhuda Mosque
- Coordinates: 30°02′57″N 31°14′47″E

Architecture
- Type: Mosque
- Completed: 1734

The Mosque of Uthman Katkhuda al-Qazdaghli, commonly referred to as the Mosque of al-Kikhya (not to be confused with the Al-Kikhya mosque in Sidon, Lebanon), is one of the Ottoman-era mosques in Egypt, built in 1734. It is located in the Azbakeya district, Cairo. It is named after Emir Uthman Katkhuda, a high-ranking Emir who constructed many religious buildings and endowed much of his property to build this mosque.

== History ==
When Prince Uthman completed its construction, he appointed the renowned Sheikh Omar ibn Ali ibn Mustafa al-Tahlawi as its teacher and Sheikh Hassan al-Maqdisi as its imam and preacher. The first prayer held there was so crowded that even Prince Uthman Bey Dhu al-Fiqar arrived late and, finding no place to pray, returned to the nearby Azbak Mosque. The mosque used to contain water jugs that were filled with dissolved sugar, which was very popular with the general public, who used to go to the mosque to worship and drink it's water.

The mosque was registered as UNSECO World Heritage site in 1979. It was affected severely by the 1992 Cairo earthquake, but faced a restoration and was fully repaired by 2000.

== Description ==
The mosque has a distinctive architectural style characteristic of the Mamluk era. It consists of a central courtyard surrounded by four iwans, the largest of which is the iwan of the great dome. This iwan is composed of three arcades supported by columns parallel to the qibla wall. The mosque has four facades and is distinguished by its exquisite decorations and granite marble lintels.

The entrance features a doorway accessed by a set of marble steps. The doorway itself is adorned with floral motifs. The mosque's upper wall is encircled by a wooden cornice inscribed with Quranic verses. In the center of the qibla wall is a crafted marble mihrab flanked by two black columns. Next to the mihrab is a wooden minbar made of turned wood and assembled inlays. Above the mihrab is a round window filled with multicolored stained glass inscribed with the names Allah, Muhammad, Abu Bakr, and Uthman.

A lintel above the mosque's entrance bears hieroglyphic inscriptions. This practice of reusing building stones from ancient temples was widely common during the past, and several mosques, churches, and temples feature inscriptions from older temples.
