= Hasan Tawfiq =

Egyptian writer (1943–2014)

- Native name: حسن توفيق
- Born: 31 August 1943 Cairo, Egypt
- Died: 30 June 2014 (aged 70)
- Occupation: Poet, literary critic, editor, journalist
- Education: A.B. in Arabic literature
- Alma mater: University of Cairo
- Genre: Free Verse
- Notable awards: Abdelaziz Saud Al-Babtyn Prize (1990)

Hasan Tawfiq (Arabic: حسن توفيق, ALA-LC: Ḥasan Tawfīq; 31 August 1943 – 30 June 2014) was an Egyptian poet, literary critic and journalist. He belongs to the third wave of the Arabic and Egyptian literary movement known as "The New Poetry." A major part of Tawfiq's poems consist of free verses. Tawfiq was known in the Arab world as a journalist and in Egypt he worked for some time as editor-in-chief of the Ar-Raya journal. Tawfiq wrote articles for the "Culture" section of the Qatar-based Ash-Sharq journal. The literary alias of Tawfiq is "Magnoon al-Arab." It derives from a Middle Eastern tragic love story, Majnun and Layla.

== Life ==
Tawfiq was born in Cairo, Egypt on 31 August 1943. In 1965 he graduated from the University of Cairo, Faculty of Literature and received a Bachelor diploma. After 13 years, in 1978, he received the Master diploma in Arabic literature. He takes an active part in the cultural life of Egypt, and belongs to different Literature associations, including the Writers Association of Egypt since 1966, The Writer's Workshop of Cairo since 1967 and the Association of New Literature of Cairo since 1971.

Tawfiq noted who had a significant influence on his future works:

"After my teacher, miss Suheir al-Qalmawi, has read my verses, I became her favorite student. That made me very glad because al-Qalmawi was the first person who discovered me like a poet. She compared me with known American writer Edgar Allan Poe. I have heard about this author but never read any of his texts. That's why just next day I found a book with Poe's verses and read there his poem "The Raven". I didn't understand some moments, but soon I found my teacher, professor Muhammad Mandur, who translated this poem into Arabic. He, and the other professor, Yusef Khalif, helped me on my way to become a poet in future".

Tawfiq noted the influence of the Writers Association of Egypt on his future literary preferences, stating

"I will never forget, that through Writers Association of Egypt, authors of my generation had opportunity to become acquainted with such famous writers and poets as Salah Abdel Sabour, Farouk Khorshid, Abdelgafar Makawi, Izuddin Ismail, Husein Nisar, Abdel Qader al-Qytt, Abdel Rahman al-Sharqawi, Ahmad Kemal Zaki, Ahmad Husein as-Saui, Muhammad Abdel Wahid, Malek Abdel Aziz and others..."

In 1990 Tawfiq's Sinbad and the New Voyage won the award for best poem in the Foundation of Abdulaziz Saud al-Babtain's Prize for Poetic Creativity in Cairo.

== Publications ==
Tawfiq grouped his works into three parts.

=== Literature critics and studies ===
- The Tendentions of a New Verse (اتجاهات الشعر الحر, 1970)
- Ibrahim Naji: The Forgotten Poems (إبراهيم ناجي - قصائد مجهولة, 1978)
- The Poetry of Badr Shakir As-Sayyab: literature and critical studies (شعر بدر شاكر السياب – دراسة فنية وفكرية, 1979)
- The Wilted flowers or forgotten poems of Sayyab (أزهار ذابلة وقصائد مجهولة للسياب, 1980)
- Gamal Abdel Nasser: A Leader in the hearts of Poets (جمال عبد الناصر – الزعيم في قلوب الشعراء, 1996)
- The full anthology of Ibrahim Naji's poetry (الأعمال الشعرية الكاملة للدكتور إبراهيم ناجي, 1996)
- Chosen poems of Ibrahim Naji (الأعمال الشعرية المختارة للدكتور إبراهيم ناجي, 2003)

=== Poetry ===
- Blood in the Parks (الدم في الحدائق, 1969)
- I like to say "No" (أحب أن أقول لا, 1971)
- The Love poems (قصائد عاشقة, 1974)
- When a dream turns into a sword (حينما يصبح الحلم سيفاً, 1978)
- Waiting for the Following (انتظار الآتي, 1989)
- History of The Flood: from Noah till pirates (قصة الطوفان من نوح إلى القرصان, 1989)
- What Sindbad have seen (ما رآه السندباد, 1991);
- Leila loves Leila (ليلى تعشق ليلى, 1996);
- Baghdad, the one who betrayed me (بغداد خانتني, 2004);
- Blossoming Rose (وردة الإشراق, 2005);
- Human, I love you (أحبك أيها الإنسان, 2006);
- No place for the revolutionaries (لا مكان للشهداء, 2012).

=== Prose ===
- Magnoon al-Arab between thunder of anger and night of desire (مجنون العرب بين رعد الغضب وليالي الطرب, 2004)
- Then night of arrest of Magnoon al-Arab (ليلة القبض على مجنون العرب, 2005)

== Literary views ==
In his poetic anthology Al A'mal Ash-Shi'riyya (الأعمال الشعرية) and in preface to Blossoming Rose Tawfiq stated that he does not support poetry in prose, because it does not sound like a good verse, but at the same time Tawfiq insisted that he supported existence of this genre itself. Like other specialists of Arabic literature, Tawfiq knew the poetry of al-Mutanabbi. In his own verses Tawfiq appealed to al-Mutanabbi's qasidas and biography, using a lot of inter-textual elements. Also Tawfiq gave an estimate of al-Mutanabbi's panegyrics, raising the question of engagement of poetry and politics. Tawfiq compared al-Mutanabbi's panegyrics to Sayf al-Daula, with Mohamed Hassanein Heikal's essays to late Egyptian president Gamal Abdel Nasser.
