= Jeddah International Book Fair =

Annual book fair in Saudi Arabia

- Venue: Events Land
- Locations: Alkurnaysh Road, Abhur Al Junoobiyah, Jeddah 23733, Saudi Arabia
- Coordinates: 21°32′36″N 39°10′22″E
- Country: Saudi Arabia
- Participants: 440 publishers
- Attendance: 75,000
- Area: 27,500 m^{2}

The Jeddah International Book Fair is the second largest book fair in Saudi Arabia, after the Riyadh International Book Fair. The first version of this book fair was held in 2015. From that year on, the book fair is usually held by December in the Events Land, South Obhur, Jeddah. One of the main aims of the fair is to "support the publishing movement in Saudi Arabia", says Prince Mishal bin Majed, the governor of Jeddah. In the sidelines of the fair, a number of galleries are organized. Additionally, many folklore shows are performed by a number of expatriate communities living in Saudi Arabia.

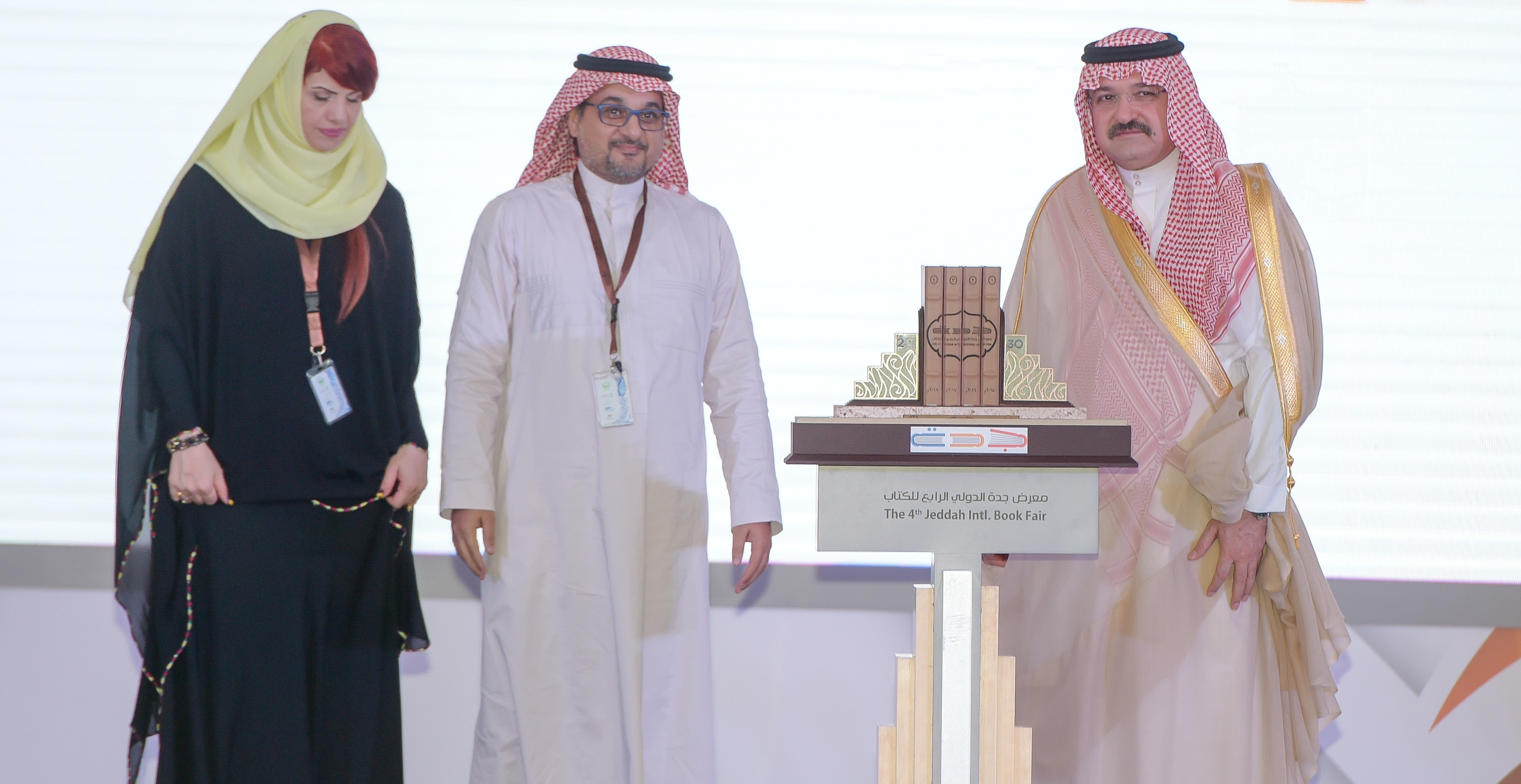
The Jeddah International Book Fair in 2018, with Mishaal bin Majid Al Saud presenting

== Organizers ==
The book fair organizers are:

1. Ministry of Culture
2. Al-Harthy Company for Exhibitions Ltd

== Participants ==
The fair usually receives participation from around 500 international publishing houses from more than 40 countries. Moreover, it pays attention to new and experienced Saudi writers.
