= Hadia (name) =

Hadia is a feminine given name with the meaning of "gift" and is mostly used in Muslim countries. Notable people with the name include:

- Hadia Bentaleb (born 1980), Algerian fencer
- Hadia Hosny (born 1988), Egyptian badminton player
- Hadia Hussein (born 1956), Iraqi writer
- Hadia Tajik (born 1983), Pakistani-Norwegian jurist, journalist and politician
