= Riyadh International Book Fair =

International book fair in Saudi Arabia

- Logo

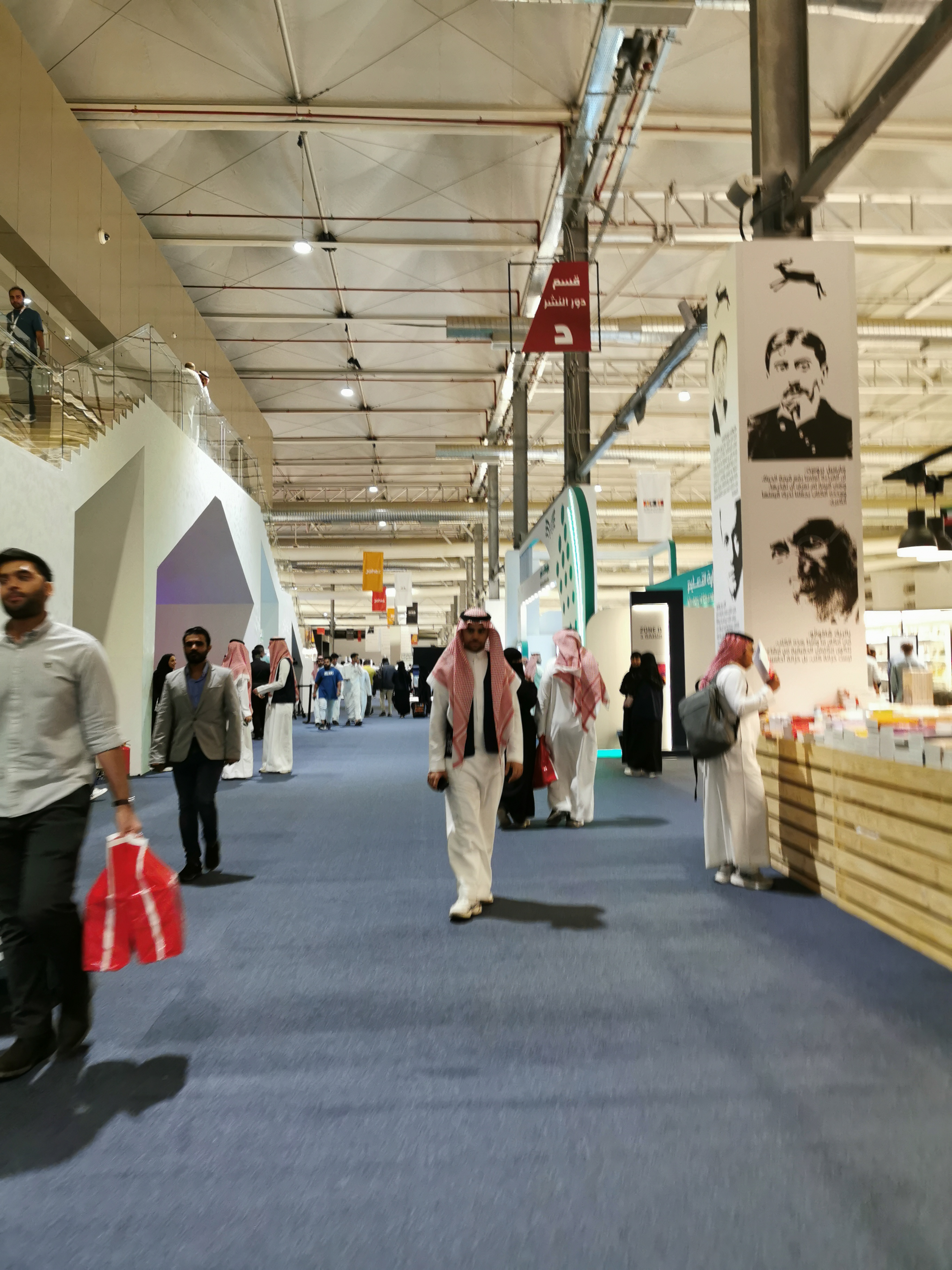
- Riyadh International Book Fair 2022
- Status: Active
- Genre: Multi-genre
- Begins: Tuesday (an opening day, not open to the general public)
- Ends: Saturday (the 10th day, not counting the opening day) (Note: Always stated to end on Saturday; because Tuesday is not open to the public, it is often stated to open on Wednesday.)
- Frequency: Annually, in mid-March to April
- Venue: Riyadh International Convention and Exhibition Center
- Location: Riyadh
- Country: Saudi Arabia
- Organizer: Ministry of Culture
- Website: https://bookfairs.moc.gov.sa/

The Riyadh International Book Fair (RIBF) is an annual book fair in Saudi Arabia. It lasts 11 days and regularly attracts over a half million visitors. The fair is used to showcase Saudi government policy, and it has been a locus of political power struggles with the government. Hundreds of publishers sell pre-approved books, and some black-market books. Writers take part in literary events. Invited speakers and the public discuss intellectual and social issues. Disagreements sometimes go beyond the bounds of debate, with speakers being shouted down and surrounded by protestors, and arrests of speakers and protestors; (Note: See the account in this article of the 2011 fair and that of the 2018 fair (as well as some of the linked articles on authors and public intellectuals).) physical assaults are rare but not unknown. Contrary to some claims, it is not the largest fair in the MENA region.

The fair is a focus for political conflict in Saudi Arabia, though some local media sources deny there is political debate. The fair is organized by the Ministry of Culture and Information, and has been regulated by the religious police; the two have clashed at the fair, and religious police have been limited to more advisory roles. Some Saudi clerics issued a fatwa criticizing the book fair during the 2012 fair. Journalist Jamal Khashoggi said of the intellectual climate: "It's like McCarthyism in the 1950s".

The fair has been both praised and criticized domestically for providing books and cultural activities which are hard to come by in Saudi Arabia, and criticized internationally for selling antisemitic and misogynistic books. Parts of the fair are gender-segregated. (Note: See the discussion in this article of restrictions on visitors.)

== Activities ==
The fair aims to provide freer access to literature, and a large selection is available, including some books banned or not usually sold in Saudi Arabia. Protests about material at the fair are common. While authorities pre-censor the books, they have sometimes confiscated previously-approved books during the fair. Publishers say that they will be banned from the Saudi market if they speak openly about books being banned. The book fair has become a topic of political controversy, praised for providing access to useful books and supporting culture and society, and criticized for insufficient, excessive, or inappropriate censorship. The traditional rarity of public events in Saudi Arabia, and the children's activities, help make it popular with the general public.

Apart from book sales, the fair also hosts writers, poets and intellectuals, who meet with the public. They sign books, take part in public discussion panels, and give public lectures. Authors give public readings of their works, without public discussion of the readings.

There have been some gender-based restrictions on admission: some times have been men-only, others "families-only", meaning that single men may not enter. From 2008 to 2011 inclusive, there were four men-only evenings; the other times were open "for all", meaning only mixed-gender family groups (there were no women-only times). (Note: See the accounts in this article of individual years; there weren't women-only times) In 2012, there were no segregated admission times, and men and families would be allowed to attend simultaneously for the first time. In practice, most schoolgroups attend in the mornings, and most of the evening visitors are men; women and families are common all day.

Separately, there are gender-based restrictions on activities within the fair. Book-signings and discussion panels generally have gender-segregated spaces. According to local media, men have been prevented from getting their books signed by female authors. "If the author is a woman [male] people have to have their book signed through a third party so as to prevent her direct contact with the public", the head of the Haiʾa at the fair explained in 2009. Female panelists participate in panels by intercom, which a panelist from outside Saudi Arabia found disconcerting. Women listen to lectures from a balcony, when not giving them. The book fair has been criticized for supporting gender mixing. In the children's areas, only women and children are allowed; men are strictly excluded.

The fair has been patrolled by the Commission for the Promotion of Virtue and Prevention of Vice (Haiʾa, religious police), who enforce gender segregation and advise on dress. Men have been prevented from entering if their hair is too long. Some of the men who have interrupted events have claimed to be members of the religious police.

A book competition awards prizes of 100,000 Saudi Arabian riyals (roughly US$26,000, as of 2016). Until 2016, winners were selected by the Ministry of Information, but in 2016 a group of King Saud University professors were made responsible.

Temporary television studios are set up within the fair, and interview authors, and there are many roaming reporters and camera teams, but personal cameras were banned, as of 2012.

== Political context ==
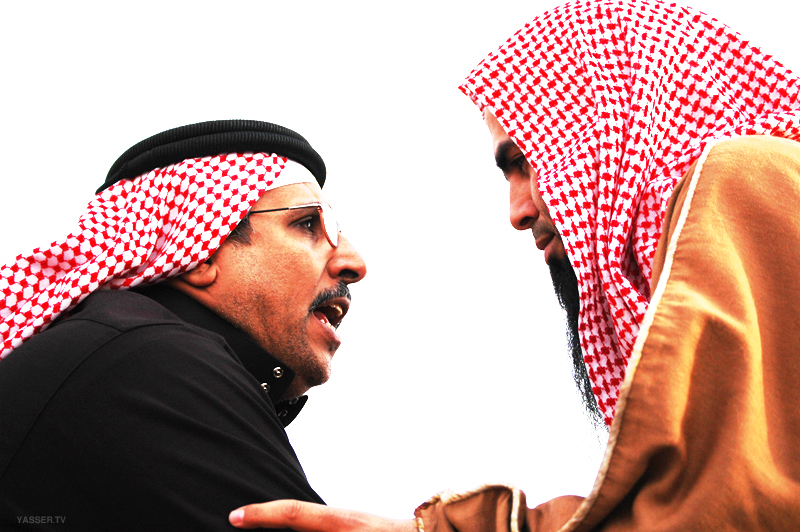
A member of the religious police (right) speaking with member of the public in 2006. Religious police at the fair have worn plainclothes, including the bisht and unbound ghotra shown here. The bisht is associated with power and religious position.

The Riyadh bookfair is a focus of political conflict: its events are easier to understand in their political context. Power in Saudi Arabia is held by the monarch (as of 2020, effectively the crown prince, Mohammed bin Salman), but traditionally also by the royal family, religious clerics, and the overlapping security services and business community, who have traditionally been allied. These alliances are not holding as they once did, because the monarchy is centralizing power and weakening other power bases.

The general public and the media (including newspapers and book publishers) hold little formal power, but their potential power has been a matter of official concern. Since the 1920s, the monarchy had repeatedly promised democratic reforms and constitutional monarchy; however, in the 2010s, it affirmed absolute monarchy.

=== Royal family ===
There has been a power struggle between the monarchy and the royal family. Royals often hold official posts, in government or academia. Some of the authors and public intellectuals at the fair are thus members of the royal family (for instance, Al-Zahrani is the name of the third royal family, and the name of a law professor who became involved in two clashes with clergy at the book fair). The large royal family has recently lost political power. Royal officials have been replaced by officials beholden to the crown prince. In 2018, members of the royal family and business community were placed under house arrest, required to sign over assets to the government, and restricted in their movements; there are reports some were physically abused, which the government denies (torture is illegal in Saudi Arabia). Subsequently, the stipends paid to members of the royal family were secretly increased.

=== Clerical officials ===
There has also been a power struggle between the monarchy and clerical officials. Clerical officials control education and the judiciary (though the monarch may issue pardons). Clerical officials traditionally censored journalists and publications, through control of the Ministry of Interior (sic). The Ministry of Interior also formerly had oversight of religious police, but lost it in the early 2010s. In 2017, the internal security forces and the powerful prosecution service were transferred from the control of the ministry to the direct control of the monarchy. The powers of the clerical officials at the book fair have been increasingly restricted; for instance, the religious police have lost the power to enforce rules, retaining only the power to report violations, and government-controlled media report that members of the religious police disrupting book fair events in the 2010s were arrested.

=== Media ===
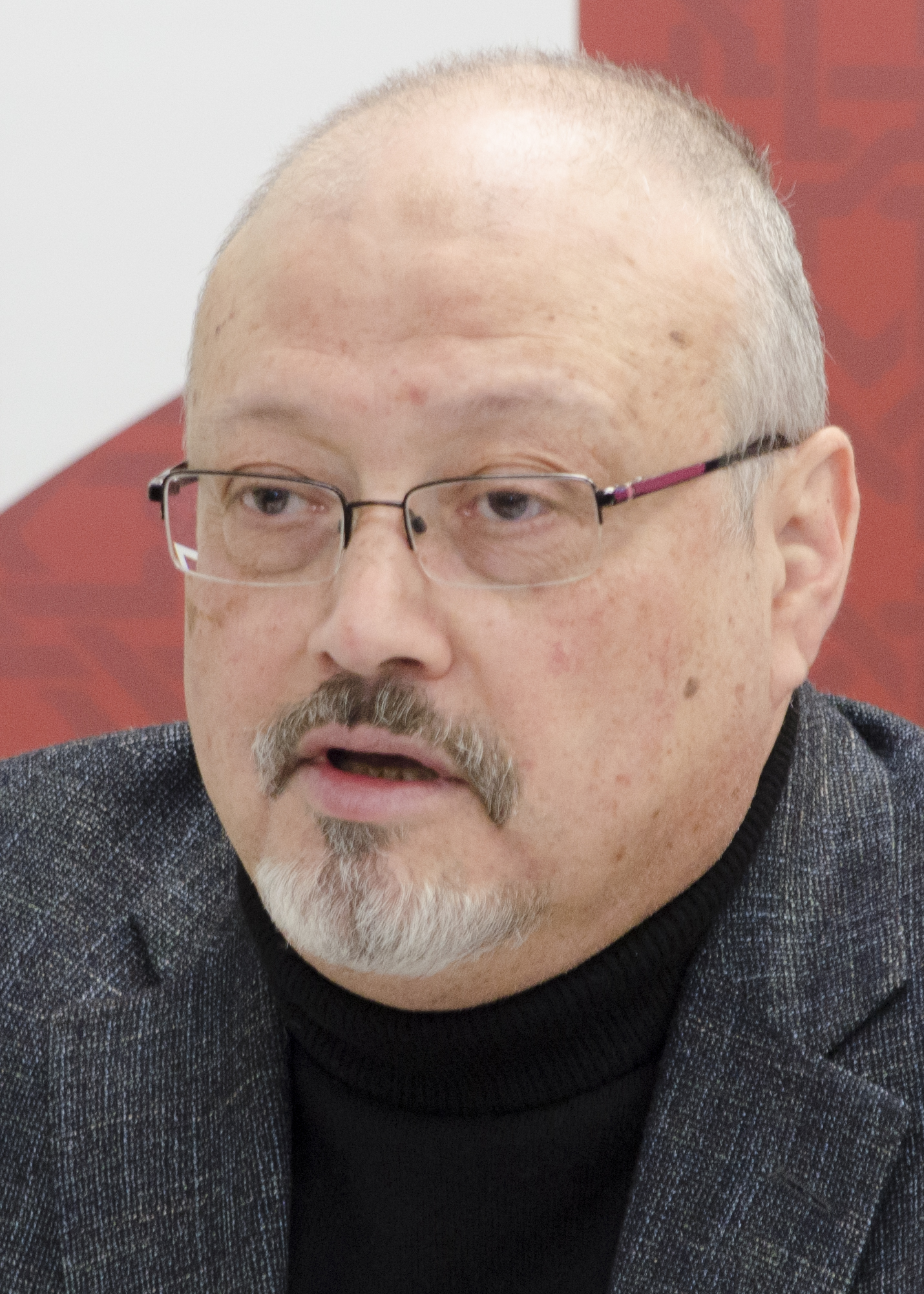
Journalist Jamal Khashoggi said of the intellectual climate: "It's like McCarthyism in the 1950s".

Editors-in-chief in Saudi Arabia are appointed only with government approval, and work to guidelines on how stories are to be covered. Newspapers are post-censored; the government can blacklist any journalist in Saudi Arabia, preventing them from working anywhere in the country, and it can have online articles taken down. Journalists have also been arrested, kept in solitary confinement, and tortured, often for unclear reasons. Journalists often attend the fair as book authors. One journalist attributed a clash with the religious police (Haiʾa) at the fair to her newspaper columns; she had criticized the Haiʾa, as Haiʾa-affiliated power over censorship weakened. Books and entire publishing houses are also censored; anyone wanting mass access to the Saudi Arabian market needs the approval of the censors.

The book fair programme is set by the monarchy, which uses it to showcase its policies; the monarchy also pre-censors the books to be legally sold. The event is regulated by the religious police, who have set admission rules, post-censored and confiscated books, and shut down events.

Censorship at the book fair, as elsewhere, has become less religious and more political in its goals, as it has been transferred from clerical to monarchic control. Social liberals have at times defended the freedom of speech of social conservatives, who now face heavier censorship at the fair and elsewhere. Informal media also face stronger restrictions; people have been jailed and tortured for blog posts and tweets. Blogs, social media, and satellite TV hinder censorship; books banned from the book fair are discussed online, and available to many through illegal downloads.

The Saudi government has spent millions on influencing foreign media coverage, especially in the wake of Jamal Khashoggi's 2018 death. Efforts have focussed on improving its international image, attracting tourists, and promoting tourist attractions.

=== Public opinion ===
The population of Saudi Arabia is young, and youth unemployment of Saudi citizens is generally 20 to 30%, higher for women, though there are doubts about the reliability of government statistics.

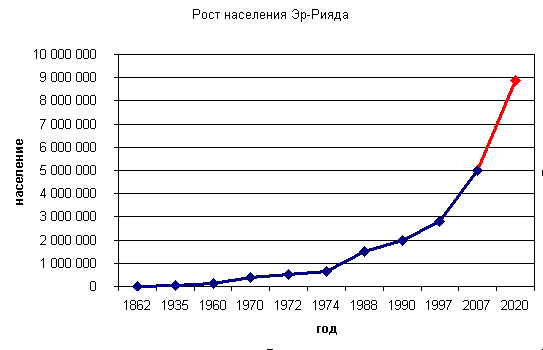
The population of Riyadh is growing rapidly

Visitors to the fair (both the public and the writers and intellectuals) seek to evade censorship, buy and sell books, including blackmarket books, and take part in discussions. They come into conflict with both the monarchy and the religious police, as well as one another.

Traditionally, the monarchy has presented itself as a progressive force, prevented from moving quickly with liberalizing reforms by the strong conservatism of the population; by implication, if the country were to become democratic, then it would become much more radically conservative. This view has been challenged domestically. It has also been suggested that the monarchy seeks to hinder a unified Saudi political movement by playing up tribalism and sectarian religious differences, and by associating demonstrations, civil disobedience and criticism with foreign actors.

From 2003 to 2005 there were petitions for human rights and a constitutional monarchy. During the Arab Spring, the 2011–12 Saudi Arabian protests, these were renewed, with public appeals and petitions for democracy. Calls for reform were driven by corruption, official impunity, detention without trial, high unemployment, and royal excesses. Foreign workers in Saudi Arabia, who make up ~30% of the population (official census figures, as of 2014) have limited rights and are disenfranchised, an additional potential source of unrest.

There was also significant activism on guardianship rules, women's franchise, the right to drive, and the rights of political prisoners. A 2013 petition called for women to be permitted to drive (a position which a Gallup poll found that the majority of Saudi men and women supported in 2007, contradicting a 2006 government poll finding 89% of women opposed it). Some petitions, like a 2016 one to abolish the male guardianship system, were supported by clerics and social liberals.

The monarchy has taken action against independent and opposition clerics, usually on the grounds that they support extremism or terrorism. It has arrested clerics of a variety of political views, including some who have supported religious tolerance and opposed travel to fight in war zones, and those supporting electoral democracy. Generally, overt support of crown prince Mohammad bin Salman is required: in some cases, this includes performing specific requested acts of support. The clerics who are tolerated all support the crown prince, though they vary in their other views. This has entailed dramatic shifts in the monarchy's attitude to groups like the Sahwa movement and the Muslim Brotherhood, to whom it had formerly given official positions and influence; one such shift was marked by the banning of all Muslim Brotherhood books from the book fair.

More such shifts have been seen on women's driving. In 2006, a politician was shouted down for raising the topic at the fair; in 2014, a driving activist had an aisle at the fair named after her; in 2017, the government announced that women would be allowed to drive, in 2018, the fair featured a driving simulator for women, women were allowed to drive, non-activist women were asked to publicly thank the government so that the change would not appear to be a victory for the activists, and many activists who had campaigned for the right to drive were arrested (including activists honoured in 2014); in 2019, a professor was arrested after expressing support of the still-detained activists at a fair discussion panel.

=== Reforms: social liberalization, political restriction ===
Since these protests, the monarchy's message has begun to shift. It is now enacting socially-liberalizing reforms, against the opposition of more conservative elements of the clergy, breaking the alliance with some hardline clerics. There is a drive to provide leisure opportunities for young people; movie theaters and music concerts are now permitted, and fashion, art, and sport promoted. The heavily-promoted book fair also provides officially-sanctioned cultural activities, and some social restrictions at the fair have been relaxed (such as women's dress codes and gender segregation).

Views on these social reforms seem to vary: young urban citizens tend to be more in favour, while conservatively religious citizens, who tend to come from specific rural areas, are more likely to oppose them. Economic reforms, driven by falling oil prices, have varying levels of support, and a poor economy is a source of discontent.

The social reforms are widely seen as a way to reduce activist pressure for reforms of political power structures (such as a greater popular voice in government). The monarchy is simultaneously taking harsher measures against dissent. Regardless of how liberal or conservative they are, activists who call for political reforms have been jailed and tortured, even when they have advocated, or worked with the government on, reforms the government has enacted. The government has also arrested academics expressing critical views (for instance, questioning government economic projections), including at the fair.

== History ==
=== 2004 ===
The 2004 fair (advertised as the tenth) had 300 publishers from 14 (mostly Arab) countries; there was one Iraqi publisher.

=== 2006 ===
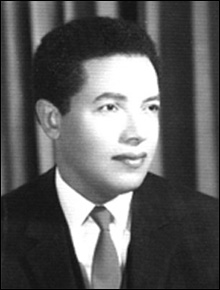
Mustafa Mahmoud published Dialogue with an Atheist in 1974; at the 2006 fair, it went on display in Saudi Arabia for the first time

The Saudi government (through the Ministry of Higher Education) was involved with organizing the event for the first time in 2006; the Riyadh Exhibitions Company said that they had signed a co-operation agreement.

Some days were restricted to "families-only" attendance, meaning that single men were not allowed to enter. The 2006 fair was held in the Riyadh Exhibition Center.

Booths of foreign publishers, such as Dar Al Saqi, The Arabic Cultural Center, Dar Al Jamal, the Arab Establishment of Research and Publishing, and Dar Al Mada, were popular. Copies of the novel Banat al-Riyadh ("Girls of Riyadh") were unexpectedly absent; it was not clear whether it had been banned or had sold out, although a representative of the publisher said it had not sold out, according to a Saudi government-run London newspaper. The same paper reported that The Dolphin's Trip and Terrorist Number 20 were banned, while the New Testament and Dialogue with an Atheist were on display for the first time. Turki Al-Hamad's novel Reeh Al-Jannah was also missing.

Some official speakers and debate topics were controversial, touching on pressing political issues, and debates were heated. A discussion panel was disrupted by hecklers who shouted down a member of the Consultative Assembly of Saudi Arabia (Mohammed Al-Zulfa) speaking at the fair on women's driving. A discussion on censorship, whose panelists included former Information Minister Muhammad Abdo Yamani and pro-government editor Turki al-Sudeiri, was shouted down by protestors, who also surrounded the panellists and physically assaulted at least one journalist.

=== 2007 ===
The 2007 fair was held in the same location as the 2006 one, and the topics selected for the cultural programme were described as less controversial.

In 2007, Abdul-Aziz al-Sabeel, deputy minister of information for cultural affairs, announced that the "families-only" days would be dropped: three evenings were open for men only; the rest would be open to all. The ministry and the religious police were said to have negotiated this change. However, it is not clear that this actually occurred; it later emerged that fair periods scheduled as "open for all" meant open to mixed-gender family groups only.

=== 2008 ===
The 2008 fair was held at the Riyadh International Exhibition Center in Morouj Dist, and featured less controversial speakers and topics than the 2006 fair.

The National Society for Human Rights offered a report on the state of human rights in Saudi Arabia at the fair. There were separate opening hours for men and mixed-gender family groups, with four evenings reserved for men only.

The US Embassy in Riydh participated, hosting a "US Information Resource Center" booth.

=== 2009 ===
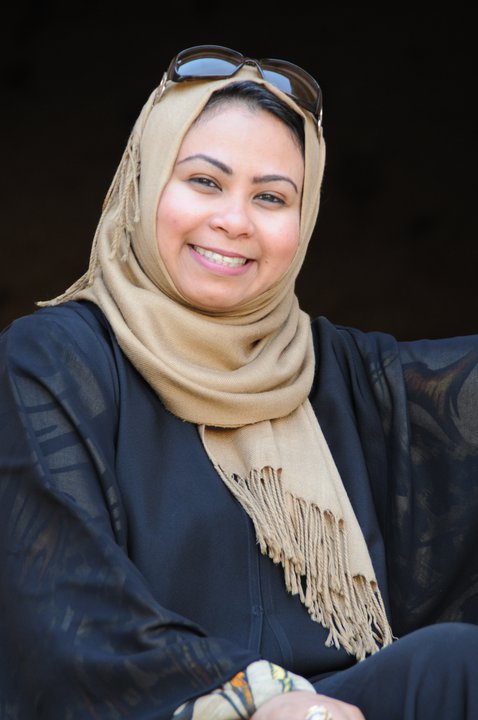
There was controversy over events at journalist Halimah Matafar's book-signing

In 2009, the fair moved to the much larger Riyadh International Exhibition Center on King Abdullah Road, and ran from Thursday 3 until 13 March. Four evenings were men-only and the rest were "for all" (meaning open to mixed-gender family groups only), according to the official conference schedule.

Saudi newspapers, which are government-controlled, reported that prices of books from non-Saudi publishing houses were up 20 to 25%, due to the costs of transportation, rental of space at the fair, and other factors. They said that some books that had previously been permitted were banned, and some previously banned were permitted, and that visitors were required to show the receipts for their books on the way out. The government-controlled Saudi Gazette also reported that books by Abdel Rahman Badawi an Amin Maalouf were missing from the fair. Dar al-Jamal, an Iraqi publisher previously popular at the fair, was banned.

Religious scholars condemned the fair for inviting Mohammed Abed al-Jabri. At the fair, al-Jabri said that religious groups sought to monopolise religious authority, by restricting the ability of civic groups to defend religious beliefs.

According to accounts in Saudi newspapers, (Note: Aside from a blog, only domestic (and thus Saudi-government-controlled) media give names of all three men; Associated Press says three men but gives one name; CNN says only two were arrested, but cite the Saudi reports. A reprinting of a domestic media article carries a great deal of detail on the incident, including what appear to be interviews with the participants. It contradicts another source on whether the journalist was trying to give books to her colleagues, and had to pass them via a male security guard, or the male writers had bought books and passed them to her via a male security guard. All the accounts seem to be by or based upon domestic media.) on Thursday the 5th, local journalist Halimah Matafar's (ar) book-signing was surrounded by five security men, six policemen and two religious policemen. They report that some male writers had their books signed; as they left, one waved and said "Thank you and goodbye" to the author, and religious police accused him of addressing an unrelated woman. Satirical novelist and journalist Abdo Khal and poet Abdullah al-Thabet (and law professor Mojab al-Zahrani, according to some accounts) complained that they were then verbally abused and taken to the religious police center; they were released without charge the same day. Halimah Matafar said that she was the only woman at the fair treated in this manner; she attributed it to her criticism (in her weekly column) of the religious police: "I felt like I was wearing an explosive belt, not signing books... If any first-time female writer was surrounded by this many policemen, she would be discouraged," she said.

During the 8th, a woman visiting with her family found only one stall staffed by a woman (likely Najet Mield, per state-controlled sources). The stallkeeper had come from France, and said staffing the stall on the first day, which was men-only, was awkward, so she had gotten a male stand-in for the men-only days. On Friday the 6th (the fourth day), saleswomen were banned from the hall on men's days.

The religious police had a large stall, which did not sell books. It exhibited items they had confiscated, and screened a video presentation on how they reverse magic spells.

=== 2010 ===
The 2010 fair advertised family-only days (no single men) and four men-only evenings. It was criticized for its website being hastily thrown up less than a day before the fair, with limited information and some technical problems. The presence of the religious police was much more muted in 2010 than in the previous year, including a smaller stall. Some stallholders were requiring official written notice that a book was banned before removing it from sale (rather than removing books on a verbal request from the religious police). Controversially, a woman did the announcements over the public address system.

The children's area (in which men are not allowed) was greatly expanded, with more children's books, a reading area, a colouring area, a stage with regular performances, and, for mothers, screenings of films on child abuse and domestic violence. The Saudi Human Rights Organization, the Riyadh Orphanage, the disabled association, a temporary museum exhibit, and other organizations had stalls just outside the exhibition hall. There was a small but varied selection of English books.

Abdo Khal's prizewinning novel Tarmi bi-Sharar (English title: Spewing Sparks as Big as Castles) was withdrawn from the fair. Books by activist Abdullah al-Hamed were confiscated.

=== 2011 ===
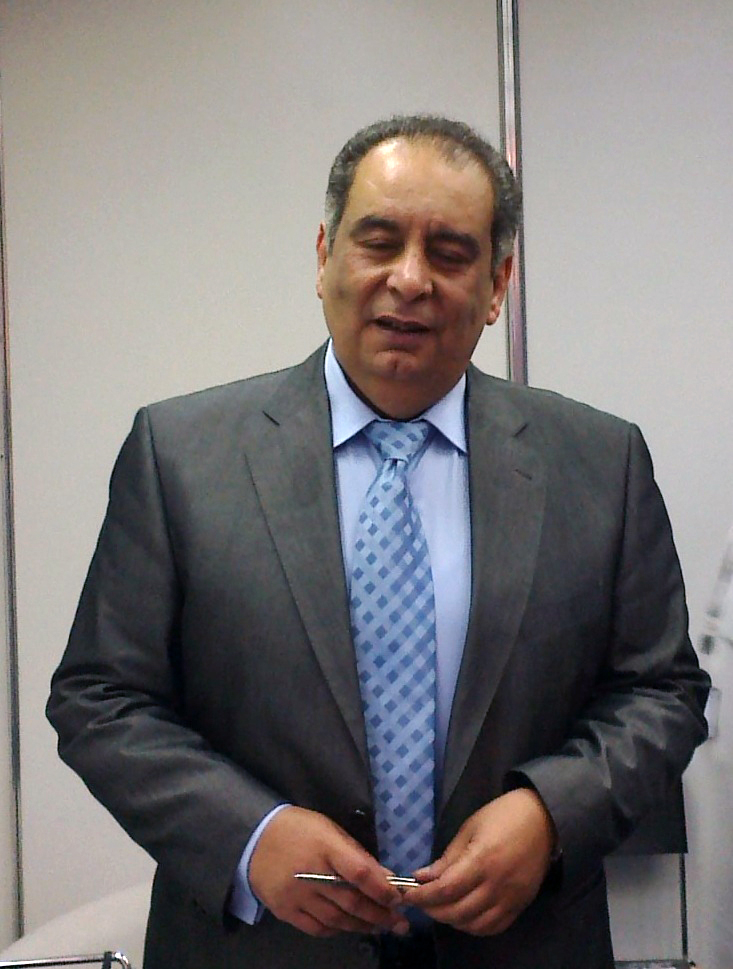
Youssef Ziedan at a book-signing at the fair in 2011; his books were confiscated midway through the 2017 fair

On the second day of the fair, a group of men (30 according to one Saudi journalist, dozens according to Agence France-Presse, and over 500 according to Al Arabiya [a domestic, and thus government-controlled, news outlet]) appeared to co-ordinate a disruption, targeting writers, publishers, journalists, and female speakers. Domestic media stated that they physically assaulted some participants, issued instructions on women's dress and behaviour over a loudspeaker, and harassed women, many of whom left. According to Al Arabiya, one challenged Abdul Aziz Khoja, the Minister of Culture and Information, on the selection of speakers, complaining that they were too liberal. Saudi media reported allegations that the men were Haiʾa members in mufti; a Haiʾa spokesman said the Haiʾa were not involved. Some were arrested (three, according to Sabq.org and Al-bab.com, or 100, according to Al Arabiya, which also said that the remaining protestors staged a sit-in calling for their release). The original source of information on this event is newspapers under the control of the Saudi government; as the government is a party to this dispute, there is a lack of independent reporting.

On the last day of the fair, a hailstorm lead to extensive leaks in the roof of the Riyadh Expo Center, flooding the exhibition hall. Squeegees were used to control the water. The flood forced many publishers to evacuate their sodden books.

Dar al-Jamal, an Iraqi publisher, was banned.

=== 2012 ===
In the lead-up to the fair, government authorities warned that only Haiʾa were allowed to deal with religious issues at the fair, and non-Haiʾa religious activists would be held accountable. This was in response to severe disruption at previous fairs. There was also an announcement that women and single men would be allowed to attend simultaneously, for the first time. The Deputy Culture Minister promised that religious police would not harass women who did not cover their faces this year. Security was heavy, likely in response to the previous year's disruption.

A poll found that women at the fair sought socially-critical novels, followed by studies on social and political issues and religious self-help books. Surprisingly, the fair had many books on the challenges the Arab Spring presented to Saudi Arabia, which were very popular.

On 11 March 2012, five days after the 11-day fair opened, 70 Saudi clerics issued a fatwa criticizing the book fair. They complained that the fair was uncensored, and thus allowed perverted literature which encourages ideological anarchy, including texts undermining the truths of Islam, and discussing deviant and pagan religions, sex, and various abominations. They also criticized the fair for being mixed-gender. Religious conservatives did not disrupt the fair as in 2011.

Syrian publishers were banned.

=== 2013 ===
The Arab Publishers Association unanimously resolved to boycott the 2013 fair, citing the exclusion of Syrian publishers from the fair, but also the price of stall space and barcode system installation. The barcode system was abandoned the same day in a tweet. About 500 publishers, local and international, participated in the fair.

Sales-tracking devices for publishers have been described as a reaction to under-the-counter sales of banned books.

Women and single men were again allowed to attend simultaneously, and the Haiʾa announced that they would only be reporting problematic books to the Ministry, not confiscating them themselves.

=== 2014 ===
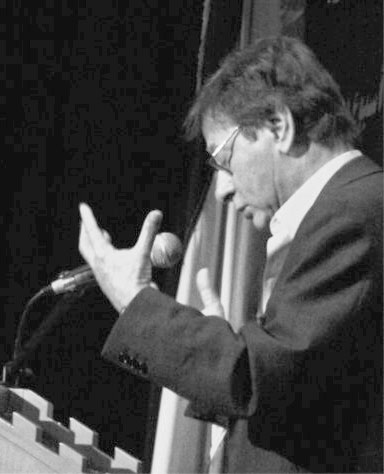
Mahmoud Darwish's poetry books were confiscated during the fair, on grounds of blasphemy

Over 570 publishers, local and international, participated.

420 books were banned at the 2014 fair, and 10,000 copies of them were confiscated. The bans were described as prompting readers to download the banned books.

The late Palestinian poet Mahmoud Darwish's books were confiscated during the fair, after the stall was surrounded by protesters. There were also complaints from religious police and allegations that the poems contained blasphemous passages. Similar actions were taken against works by well-known poets Badr Shaker al-Sayyab, Abdul Wahab al-Bayati, and Muin Bseiso.

The Arab Network for Research and Publishing, arriving at the former location of their stall on the Friday morning of the 2014 fair, found that it had been dismantled overnight, with their books confiscated, their materials scattered on the floor just outside, and the signage on their stall replaced by signage naming another publisher. The group's publishing focusses on nonfiction about Saudi Arabia and political Islam. The books had been pre-approved, and most were sold in previous years; the reversal of the decision was attributed to the tenser political situation. The publisher was reportedly permanently banned from the fair.

Azmi Bishara's books were also banned amid escalating tensions with Qatar. Other banned books included Revolution 2.0, by Wael Ghonim, When will the Saudi Woman Drive a Car? by Abdullah Al Alami, and Al Estbdad ("The Tyranny"), by Ahmed bin Hamad al-Khalili, the Grand Mufti of Oman. The titles The History of Hijab and Feminism in Islam were also banned.

Madeha al-Ajroush, a photographer and activist who campaigned for women's right to drive, had an aisle at the fair named after her. The fair also featured a book on the driving protests, Sixth of November, by Aisha al-Mana and Hissa al-Sheikh.

=== 2015 ===
Sales of the compilation book On the meaning of Arab Nationalism: Concepts & Challenges were permitted at the fair, but banned outside the fair. Haiʾa presence was less conspicuous this year.

A seminar entitled "Youth and Arts... A Call for Coexistence" was stopped by religious police after professor Mojab al-Zahrani condemned the destruction of monuments by the Islamic State of Iraq and the Levant. They accused the speaker of idolatry.

The fair ended with a statement that anyone distributing printed materials, books or videos to visitors without prior authorization would face questioning by security authorities.

=== 2016 ===
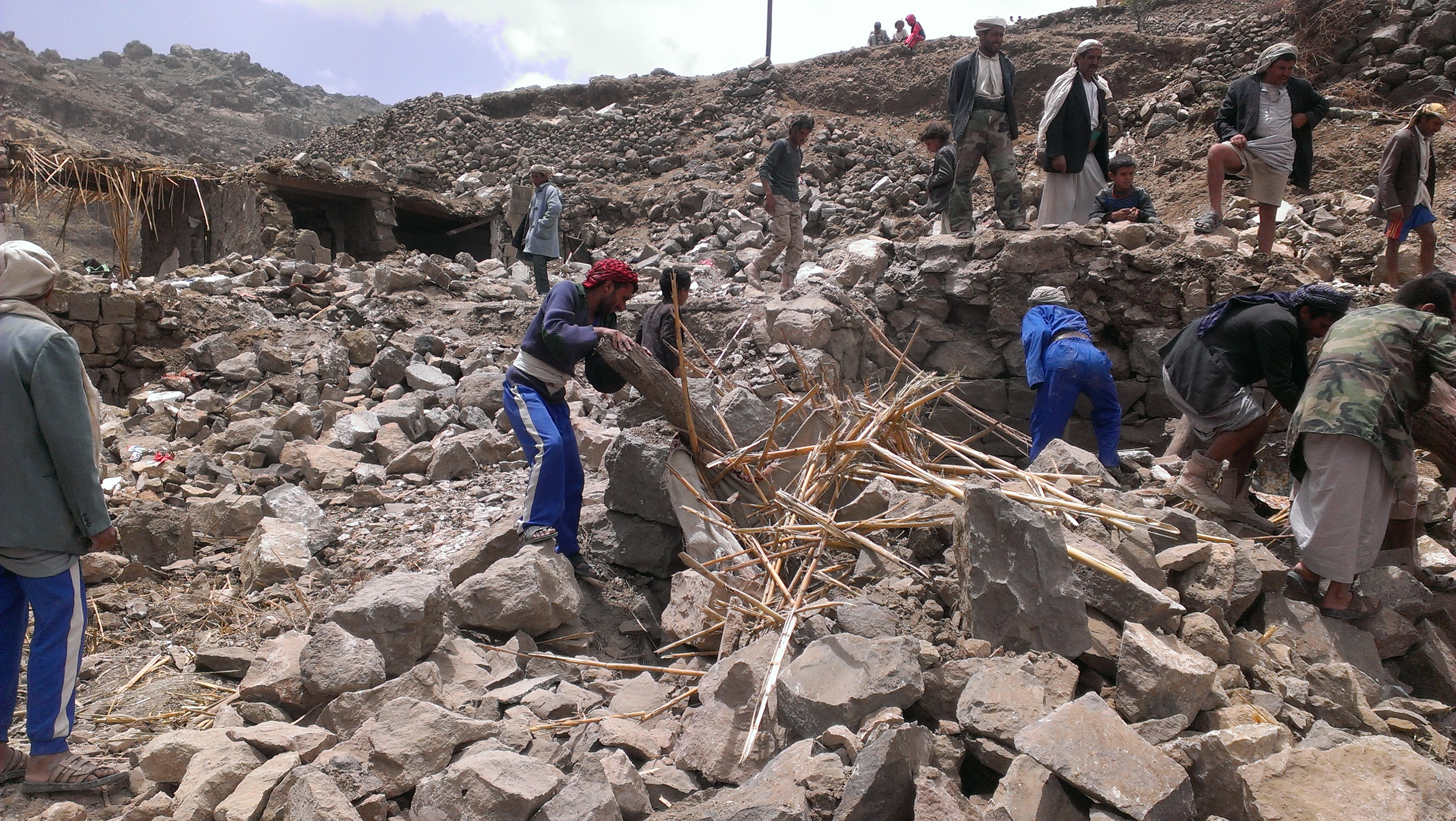
The war in Yemen was a major theme of the 2016 fair

The 2016 fair was noted for its military themes, centered around the Saudi Arabian-led intervention in Yemen (which began in 2015). The Minister also praised the theater in his opening speech.

The opening day was noted for its international and rich local guests, and a temporary relaxation of gender segregation and women's dress codes, tightened again for the following days. A Kuwaiti author was told not to smile, as this showed his dimples, which were considered seductive.

The US government was questioned about praise its diplomats gave the fair in light of antisemitic texts on sale. The fair also included misogynistic books, such as Women Who Deserve to go to Hell by Mansour Abdel Hakim. The US State Department later condemned the antisemitic books and other hate speech, distancing itself from the fair.

Electronic tracking of books was implemented in an attempt to prevent under-the-counter sales of unapproved books.

Journey to a Land Not Ruled By Allah, by Ibrahim al-Tamimi, was reported banned after conservatives tweeted objections to it using the "Campaign Against Atheist Accounts" hashtag. The fair's selection tended towards academic and technical subjects, avoiding books on sex, politics, and religion.

=== 2017 ===
Youssef Ziedan's books were confiscated midway through the 2017 fair, which he attributed to his mention of the disputed Red Sea islands of Tiran and Sanafir.

12 students of the Sekolah Seni Malaysia Johor Art School, performing a Malaysian folk dance, were interrupted by a heckler; other spectators told the heckler to leave the students alone. The religious police took prompt action and stopped the performance. A young Malaysian painted murals during the event.

=== 2018 ===
Held months after women were legally permitted to drive, the fair featured a booth with a driving simulator for women.

A publisher's stall was closed down, and the publisher banned from participating in the fair forever, for selling Muslim Brotherhood books, on grounds that these incited violence and terrorism. This was criticised; Jamal Khashoggi wrote: "Liberals whose work was once censored or banned by Wahhabi hard-liners have turned the tables: They now ban what they see as hard-line, such as the censorship of various books at the Riyadh International Book Fair last month. One may applaud such an about-face. But shouldn't we aspire to allow the marketplace of ideas to be open?"

The Simon Wiesenthal Center documented the display of antisemitic conspiracy texts at the fair, and requested that texts that inflame hatred against Jews be treated in the same manner as the Muslim Brotherhood texts were.

=== 2019 ===
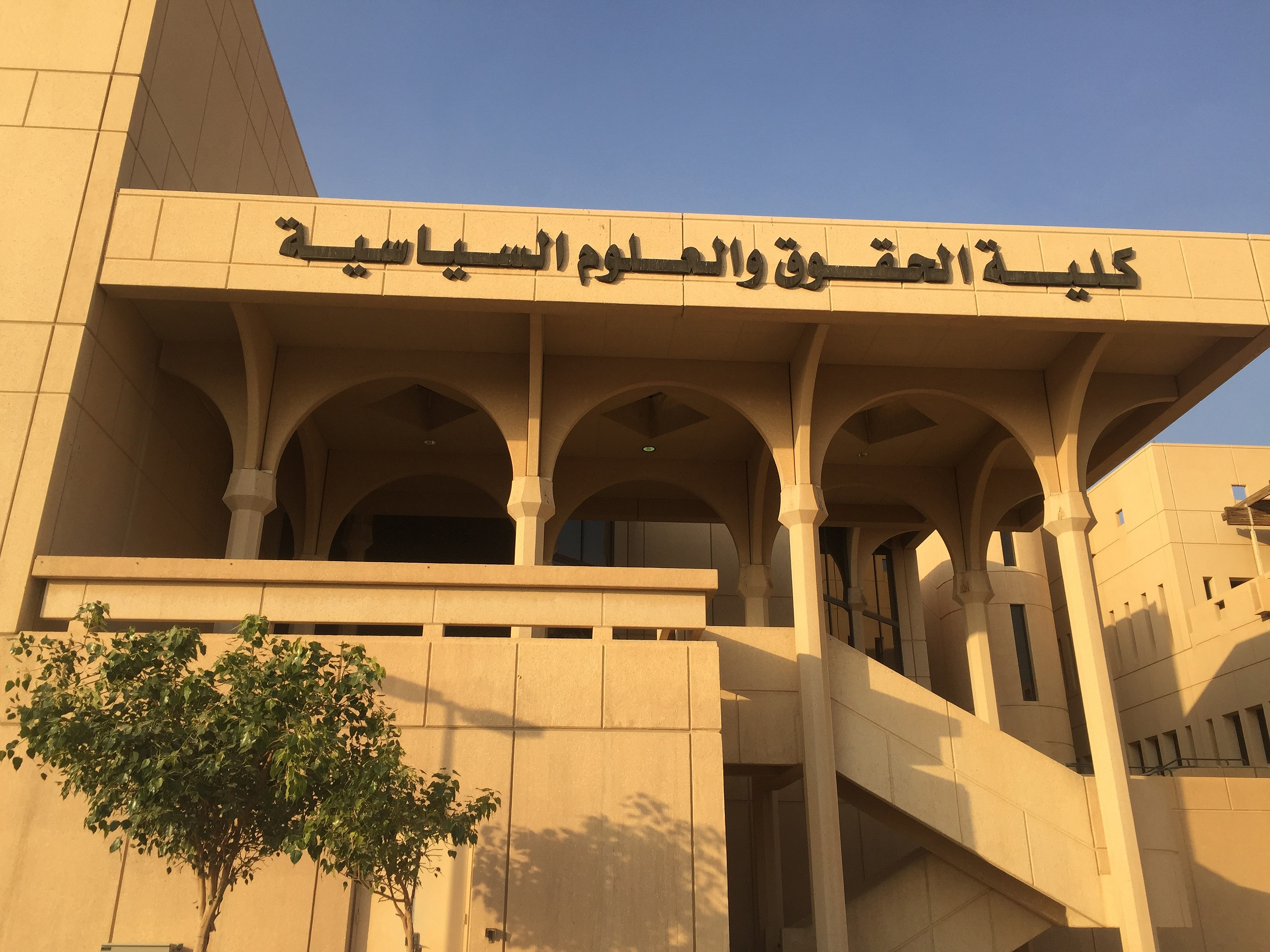
The College of Law and Political Science at King Saud University; Anas al-Mazrou, who was arrested shortly after speaking at the fair, lectured here

Anas al-Mazrou, a law professor at King Saud University, was arrested for speaking of the detention of women's rights activists in Saudi Arabia during one of these panel discussions at the 2019 fair. "No one dares to ask, and I am not challenging anybody, including those who are sitting here on stage, to ask about the human rights activists," he said. He named four people as having "contributed to spread the idea of human rights... I will give you an idea and I invite everybody to think about it; the idea of the nation being the guardian of itself, [such that the guardian] is the people, not the ruler" No information was given on where he was taken, and was described on 9 September as having had no contact with his family during this detainment. The video (Note: The video may be seen here (Youtube).) went viral.

The Simon Wiesenthal Center again complained that the fair sold anti-semitic texts, including Hitler's Mein Kampf. They said that "Of the six Arab Book Fairs we annually monitor, antisemitic texts are sadly the most numerous in Riyadh", and asked the Saudi government to apply the same measures to "all forms of hate, on the same level as offences to Islam".

=== 2020 ===
In July 2019, the Saudi Ministry of Culture announced that the 2020 fair would be held from 2 to 11 April at 'Riyadh Front'. However, on 5 March, the Ministry announced that the fair was postponed, as a precaution against the worldwide outbreak of COVID-19.

=== 2022 ===
The Saudi government announced that the 2022 event would span ten days beginning on 29 September and ending on 8 October 2022, with Tunisia as the guest of honor.

=== 2024 ===
The 2024 Riyadh International Book Fair was held from 26 September to 5 October 2024 at King Saud University in Riyadh under the slogan Riyadh Reads. The fair was organized by the Literature, Publishing and Translation Commission of the Saudi Ministry of Culture.

Qatar was selected as the guest of honor for the 2024 edition. The Qatari participation included cultural institutions, publishing houses, writers, artists, and a dedicated cultural program showcasing the country's literary and artistic achievements. Its cultural program included seminars, panel discussions, workshops, poetry evenings, theatrical performances, book signings, and activities for children and families.

=== 2025 ===
The 2025 Riyadh International Book Fair was held from 2 to 11 October 2025 at Princess Nourah Bint Abdul Rahman University in Riyadh under the slogan Riyadh Reads. Organized by the Literature, Publishing and Translation Commission, the fair brought together more than 2,000 publishing houses and cultural institutions from over 25 countries. Uzbekistan was selected as the guest of honor for the 2025 edition. Its participation included a national pavilion showcasing Uzbek literature, manuscripts, cultural heritage, and artistic traditions.

== Administrative history ==
The fair was initially organized by the Riyadh Exhibitions Company. However, in 2006, the company said it had signed a co-operation agreement with the Saudi Arabian Ministry of Higher Education to run the fair. Later, the Ministry of Information and Culture and, after a split, the Ministry of Culture, were placed in charge.

== See also ==
- Cairo International Book Fair
- Jeddah International Book Fair
