= Maysalun Hadi =

Iraqi writer (born 1954)

- ميسلون هادي
- Born: 1954 (age 71–72); Adhamiyah, Baghdad, Iraq
- Education: University of Baghdad
- Occupation: Writer

Maysalun Hadi (Arabic: ميسلون هادي; born 1954) is an Iraqi writer. She was born in the Adhamiyah district of Baghdad and studied statistics at Baghdad University. As a writer, she has published numerous books and articles, spanning a wide range of genres. Her novel Prophecy of Pharaoh won the Bashraheel prize for best Arabic novel and was translated into English by Angham Altamimi. Another novel A Light Pink Dream was made into a film, while Throne and Stream has been translated into English and French. Her most recent work Mohammed's Brothers by Al-Thakera Publishing House was nominated for the Arabic Booker Prize.

Hadi lives in Baghdad.
