= Hadia Hussein =

Iraqi writer (born 1956)

Hadia Hussein (born 1956) is an Iraqi writer. The author of numerous novels and short story collections, she is best known for her Arabic Booker Prize-nominated novel Riyam and Kafa. Other noted books include Beyond Love (2003, translated into English), "Very noisy night" by Al-Thakera Publishing House and That's Another Matter (2002, translated into Serbian).

Hussein was born into a cultural family, and started writing at an early age. She was blacklisted by the regime of Saddam Hussein and was forced to leave Iraq in 1999. She lived in Jordan and then in Canada.
