= Soor El Azbakeya =

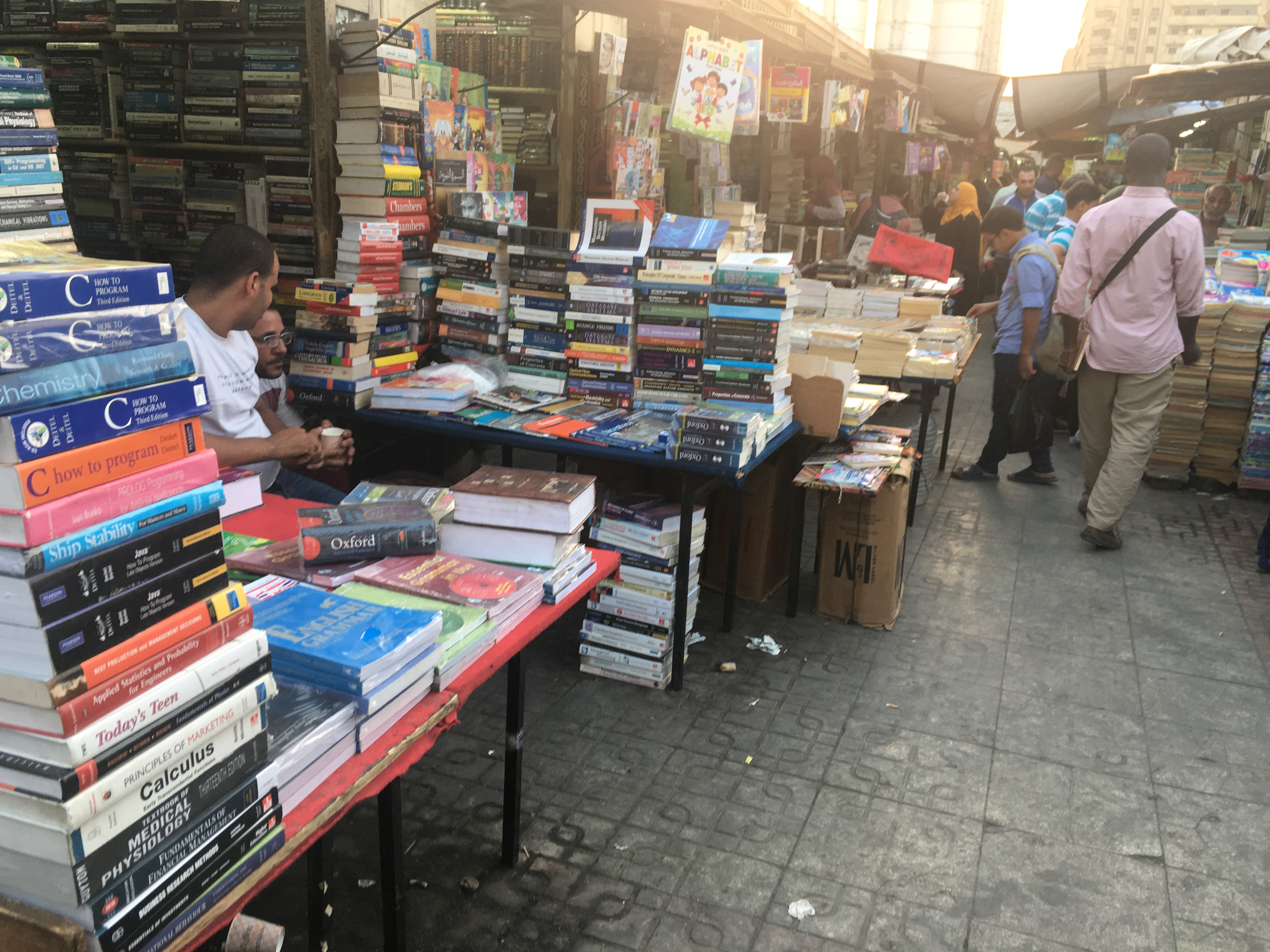
- Location: Azbakeya, Egypt
- Established: 1907

Soor El Azbakeya and The Azbakia Wall (Ar|سور الأزبكية)is a book market for old and used books in Azbakeya, Cairo, Egypt. Established in 1907, it has attracted visits from several presidents and a number of famous writers and orientalists.

== History ==
The market originated by chance in 1907 with a young man from Upper Egypt. While in search of a livelihood, he established the market among the cafes of Ataba Square and its patrons—the educated elite and students. He began collecting the discarded books from the bookstores in the Fagala district, sold by weight or in bulk for a few piasters, and resold them to those seeking knowledge and reading at a lower price. A number of other young men followed his example, and over the years, the used book trade transformed from an individual endeavor into a large market.

Initially, the market consisted of modest stalls, and their owners were often harassed by municipal officials because they were operating without proper permits. The situation stabilized for the vendors when the Cairo Governorate organized the area in 1952, establishing licensed kiosks and bookstores for them. This marked the true beginning of the Azbakeya Wall's glory.

After the Egyptian Royal Opera House burned down in 1971, the Cairo Governorate built a multi-story parking garage on the site. In the 1990s, when excavations began beneath the Azbakeya Wall to construct a metro line, the wall was completely demolition of the wall and the bookstores were temporarily closed.

The Azbakeya Wall gained its importance from the type of people who frequented it: those seeking out-of-print, rare books. This wall served as a hub for buying, selling, and exchanging all kinds of books. Writer Suleiman Fayyad famously referred to the wall as "the university of the poor" in his radio program "From the Azbakeya Wall". Those seeking affordable books, particularly those from impoverished backgrounds, frequented the wall, finding it a haven for reading and learning at low prices.

The market was frequented by some famous writers, poets, and politicians, including, for example, the writer Mahmud Taymur, the novelist Naguib Mahfouz, the writer Ibrahim al-Mazini, and the writer and poet Abbas Mahmoud al-Aqqad. It is also worth mentioning that one of the most prominent patrons of this ancient place was the late Egyptian President Gamal Abdel Nasser, who used to frequent the Azbakia Wall personally to buy the books he wanted and to check on the vendors. Muhammad Anwar al-Sadat did the same before he became President of Egypt, as he mentioned in his famous book, *Searching for Sadat* (also known as *Searching for Self*).

== Contents ==
The Azbakeya Wall consists of wooden bookstores in a unique, uniform style, brimming with books on the history of Egyptian and Arab culture, and novels by prominent Egyptian and international authors. The Wall contains rare books by Shakespeare and Charles Dickens, which are not copyrighted and are therefore reprinted due to high demand. It also houses school textbooks popular with Egyptian families for their affordable prices, dictionaries of various world languages, and very old books, some over 150 years old, as well as rare books not found in Cairo's most prestigious bookstores. These include works on psychology, philosophy, astronomy, mathematics, and metaphysics.

== Renovation ==
The bookstores were designed and renovated in a style that complements Cairo's history and the ongoing development of Azbakeya Park. They have also been equipped with fire extinguishers and a civil defense system. The names of writers and authors have been given to the newly renovated bookstore corridors to commemorate their contributions to Egyptian culture.

== See also ==
- Cairo International Book Fair
