= Al-Zahrani =

Al-Zahrani, al-Zahrani or Alzahrani (Arabic: الزهراني) is a surname in Saudi Arabia that is taken from the royal Zahran tribe.

Notable people with the surname include:

- Fahad Al-Zahrani (born 1979), Saudi Arabian footballer
- Khamis Al-Zahrani (born 1976), Saudi Arabian footballer
- Saad Al-Zahrani (born 1980), Saudi Arabian footballer
- Saeed Al-Zahrani (footballer, born 1992), Saudi Arabian footballer
- Saeed Al-Zahrani (footballer, born 1995), Saudi Arabian footballer
- Yasser Talal Al Zahrani (1984–2006), Saudi Arabian man who was held in extrajudicial detention in Guantanamo Bay
