= Zarqa al Yamama =

Legendary figure of pre-Islamic Arabia

Zarqa al-Yamama (Arabic: زرقاء اليمامة, romanized: Zarqāʾ al-Yamāma) was a legendary blue-eyed woman from the al-Yamama region who lived in pre-Islamic Arabia. She belonged to the Jadis tribe and was said to have had exceptional intuition, sharp eyesight, and ability to predict events before they occurred.

== Legend ==
According to the ancient tale, Zarqa's tribe relied on her powers in detecting enemies and defending their land, as she was believed to have the ability to see riders from the distance of one week. In hopes to evade Zarqa's gaze, enemies of her tribe decided to hide behind trees which they carried. Zarqa noticed what was going on and alerted her tribe that the trees were moving towards them. To her dismay, members of her tribe thought she was going mad and choose to ignore her warning. The troops of Hassan al-Himyari eventually reached her tribe and killed every man in the camp, then they tore out Zarqa's eyes and crucified her.

== Adaptations ==
In 2024, the grand opera Zarqa Al Yamama premiered in Riyadh. The libretto was written in Arabic by the Saudi poet Saleh Zamanan, while the music was composed by Australian composer Lee Bradshaw.

== Sources ==
- Jedamski, Doris (2009). Chewing Over the West: Occidental Narratives in Non-Western Readings. Rodopi. ISBN 9789042027831.
