= Mustafa Mahmoud =

Egyptian doctor and author

- مصطفى محمود
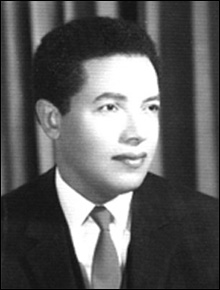
- Mustafa Mahmoud on Egyptian television
- Born: Mustafa Kamal Mahmoud Hussein; 27 December 1921; Shibin El Kom, Monufia Governorate, Sultanate of Egypt
- Died: 31 October 2009 (aged 87); Giza, Giza Governorate, Egypt
- Resting place: Mustafa Mahmoud Mosque, Giza
- Citizenship: Egypt
- Education: Cairo University – College of Medicine
- Alma mater: Cairo University
- Occupations: Physician; psychologist; author; Muslim scholar; reformer
- Years active: 1947–2009
- Organization: Mustafa Mahmoud Society
- Known for: Science and Faith; Islamic reform; philosophical writings
- Notable work: My Journey from Doubt to Belief; Dialogue with an Atheist; The Tormented in the Earth; The Great Evangelist
- Television: Science and Faith
- Title: Dr.
- Movement: Islamic Modernism
- Awards: State Appreciation Award (1995); Order of Merit for Science and Arts (First Class)

Mustafa Kamal Mahmoud Hussein (Arabic: مصطفى كمال محمود حسين; 27 December 1921 – 31 October 2009) was an Egyptian doctor, philosopher, and author. Mustafa was born in Shibin el-Kom, Monufia province. He was trained as a doctor, but later chose a career as a journalist and author, traveling and writing on many subjects. He wrote 89 books on science, philosophy, religion, politics, and society as well as plays, tales, and travelogues.

He was known for his popular program Science and Faith. Mustafa founded a mosque, a medical clinic, and a charitable organization which were all named after him.

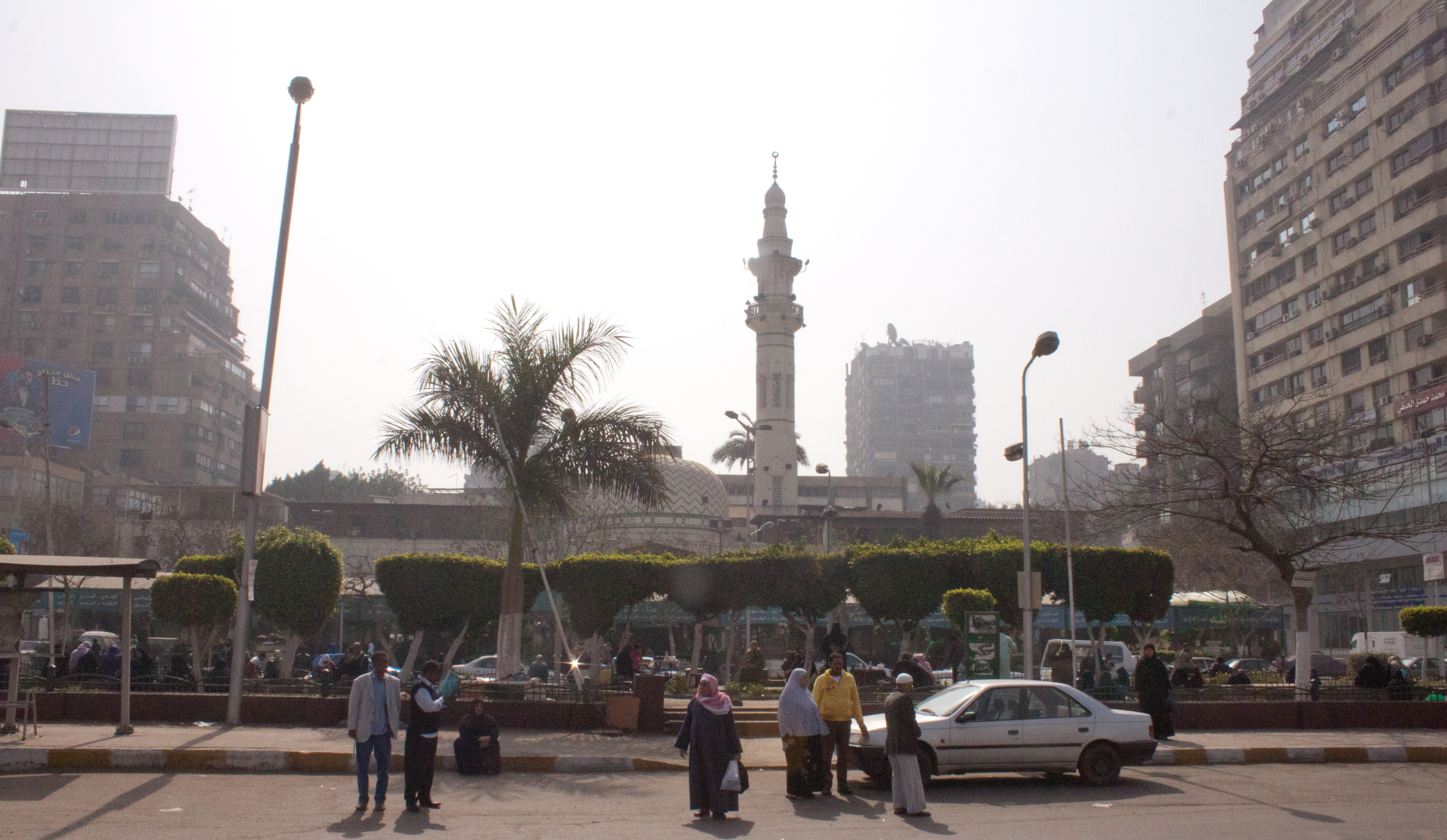
Mostafa Mahmoud Mosque

== Publications ==
=== Books ===
1. (2004): Understanding The Qur'an : A Contemporary Approach ISBN 1-59008-022-X
2. (1999): What's Behind The Gate of Death
3. (1998): The Password ISBN 977-08-0694-3
4. (1998): New Quranic Psychology ISBN 978-977-11-1718-6
5. (1997): Israel: The Beginning and The End
6. (1995): The Burning Tomorrow
7. (1994): Islam in the Dike
8. (1992): I Saw God
9. (1992): Political Islam and the Upcoming Battle ISBN 977-08-0403-7
10. (1991): Political Circus Games
11. (1990): Reading for the future ISBN 977-08-0037-6
12. (1989): The Perplexed Question ISBN 977-02-2611-4
13. (1985): Bahai Facts ISBN 977-02-1502-3
14. (1984): Marxism and Islam ISBN 977-02-0969-4
15. (1984): Gentlemen, Unveil These Masks! ISBN 977-02-0901-5
16. (1984): What is Islam? ISBN 977-02-1110-9
17. (1982): From America to the other Shore ISBN 977-02-0255-X
18. (1981): Dialog Antara Muslim Dan Atheis ISBN 9971-77-021-0
19. (1978): The Quran: A Living Creature
20. (1978): Age of Monkeys
21. (1978): The Lie About the Left Islamist Groups ISBN 977-247-404-2
22. (1976): Existence and Nonentity
23. (1975): Muhammad
24. (1975): The Greatest Secret
25. (1974): Dialogue with an Atheist
26. (1972): Allah
27. (1972): The Torah
28. (1970): My journey from Doubt to Belief
29. (1969): The Quran - An Attempt to a Modern Understanding
30. (1961): Einstein and Relativity
31. (1959): Death mystery ISBN 978-977-11-1724-7

=== Articles ===
1. (1992): The World of Secrets
2. (1985): The Devil Rules
3. (1982): Is It The Age of Insanity? ISBN 977-02-0499-4
4. (1979): Fire under the ashes
5. (1973): The Spirit & The Body
6. (1966): In Love and Life

=== Short stories ===
1. (1979): The Antichrist
2. (1966): The Smell of Blood
3. (1964): The Social Gang
4. (1954): Eating Bread

=== Novels ===
1. (1966): A Man Less Than Zero
2. (1965): Getting out of the Coffin
3. (1965): The Spider
4. (1964): Opium
5. In (1963), he wrote The Earthquake, a play criticizing the Gamal Abdel Nasser regime. Years later, it was released in theaters and starred actor Salah Zulfikar in 1990.
6. (1960): The Impossible

=== Plays ===
1. (1996): A Visit to Heaven and Hell
2. (1982): The Smallest Hell-fire
3. (1973): The Leader
4. (1973): The Devil Lives in our House
5. (1964): The Human and the Shadow
6. (1963): The Earthquake
7. (1963): Alexander The Great

N°	Book Title	Publication
1	Alexander The Great	1963
2	The Earthquake	1963
3	The Human and the Shadow	1964
4	The Devil Lives in our House	1973
5	The Leader	1973
6	The Smallest Hell-fire	1982
7	A Visit to Hell and Heaven	1996

=== Travel literature ===
1. (1971): The Road to the Kaaba
2. (1971): Traveler Stories
3. (1969): Adventure in the Desert
4. (1963): The Forest

== Memorials, honors, and awards ==
- 1995 Literature State Appreciation Award (Egypt)
- Mustafa Mahmud Square, Cairo, Egypt
- Asteroid 296753 Mustafamahmoud, discovered by Russian amateur astronomer Timur Kryachko at the Zelenchukskaya Station in 2009, was named in his memory. The official naming citation was published by the Minor Planet Center on 12 July 2014 (M.P.C. 89086).
