= Salah Abdel Sabour =

Egyptian poet

Salah Abdel Sabour (Arabic: صلاح عبد الصبور) (May 1931 – 14 August 1981) was an Egyptian free verse poet, editor, playwright and essayist. He showed an interest in literature in his early life and started to write verses at the age of 13. Salah graduated from Cairo University in 1951 with a degree in Arabic literature.

Soon after graduation from the university, he took up teaching Arabic at state high school, a job he did not enjoy doing. He eventually abandoned it and began working for Rose al-Yūsuf Magazine as journalist then became the literary editor for al-Ahram. Afterwards, he held the position of undersecretary of the Ministry of Culture. From there, he became the editor-in-chief for the Cinema and Theater magazine. Between 1977 and 1978, he served as a press counselor for the Egyptian embassy in India and then headed the General Egyptian Book Organization until his death.

His first collection of poems, an-Nas fi Biladi ("People In My Land") published in 1956, marked the beginnings of the free verse movement in Egyptian poetry.

== Quotes ==
- "I am not possessed with melancholy; I do rather possess it as a stimulant to achieve self-rejuvenating and higher and more conscious prospects beyond the ego".
