= Azbakeya =

Historic district in Cairo, Egypt

Coordinates: 30°03′10″N 31°14′54″E

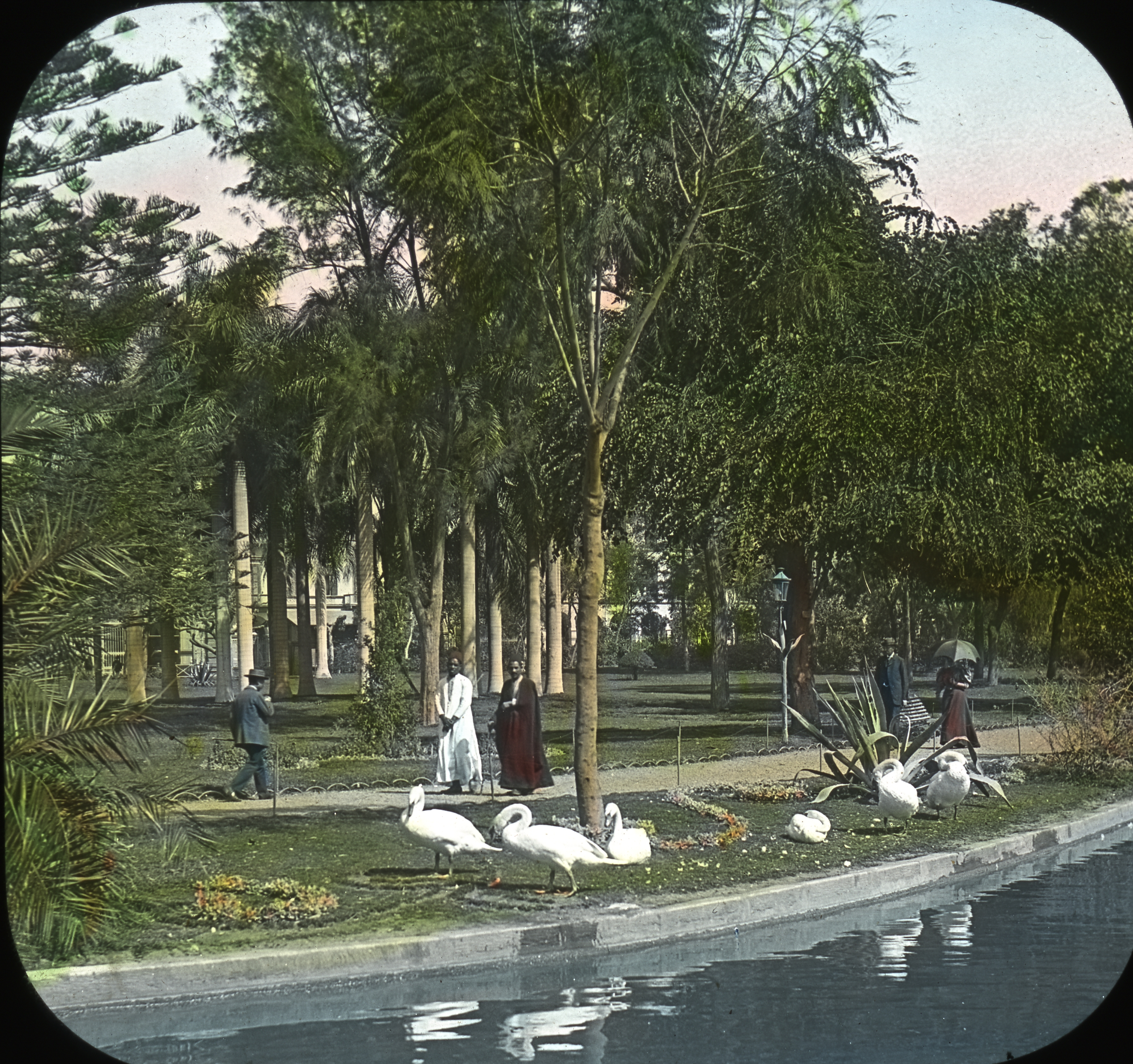
A garden of the Azbakeya Palace

Azbakeya (Arabic: أزبكية; also spelled Al Uzbakeya or Auzbekiya) is one of the districts in the Western Area of Cairo, Egypt. Along with Wust Albalad (Downtown) and Abdeen, Azbakiya forms Cairo's 19th century expansion outside the medieval city walls known officially as Khedival Cairo and declared as an Area of Value. It holds many historically important buildings and spaces. One of these is the Saint Mark's Coptic Orthodox Cathedral, which was inaugurated by Pope Mark VIII in 1800 and served as the seat of the Pope of the Coptic Orthodox Church of Alexandria from 1800 to 1971. Azbakeya was the place where the first Cairo Opera House was established, in 1869.

== Administrative divisions and population ==
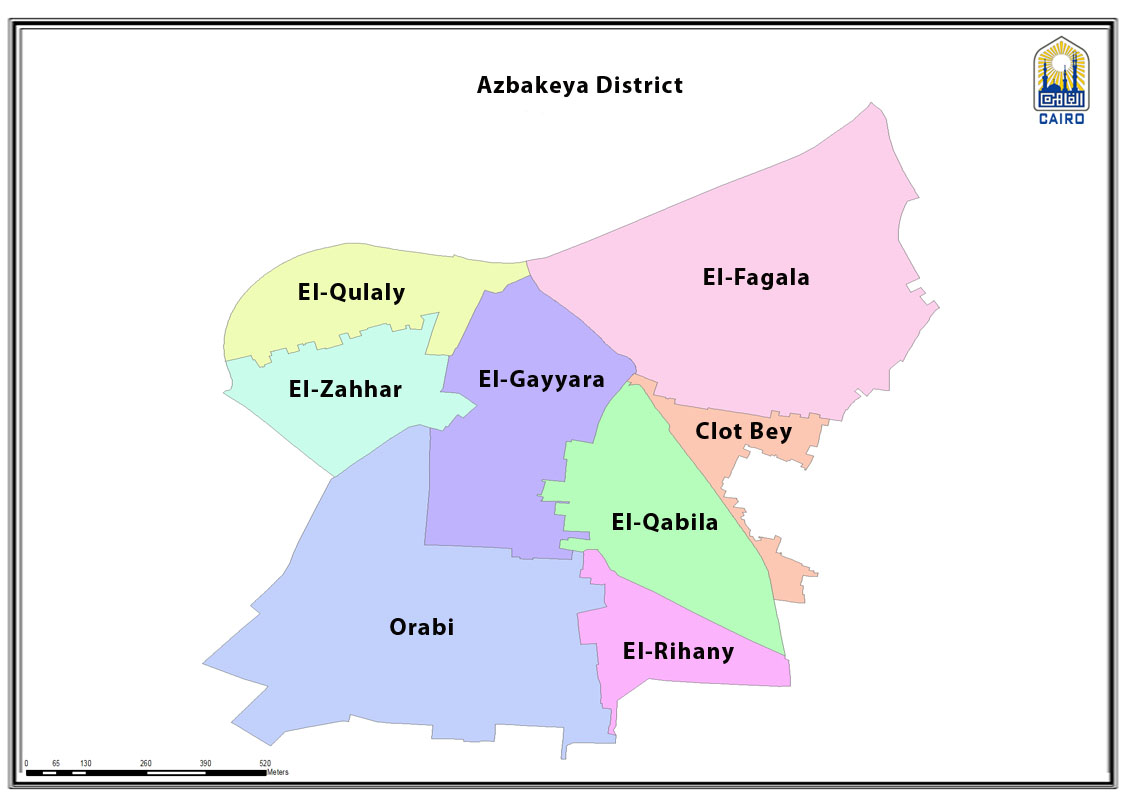
Azbakiya, Cairo district map

In 2017, Azbakiya diatrict/qism had 19,763 residents in its eight shiakhas:

Nom	Code 2017	Population totale
`Urâbî	012007	2027
Fajjâla, al-	012004	2833
Jayyâra, al-	012001	837
Klût Bây (Clot bey)	012008	1522
Qabîla, al-	012005	4039
Qulalî, al-	012006	3439
Rîḥânî, al-	012002	953
Zahhâr, al-	012003	4113

== History ==
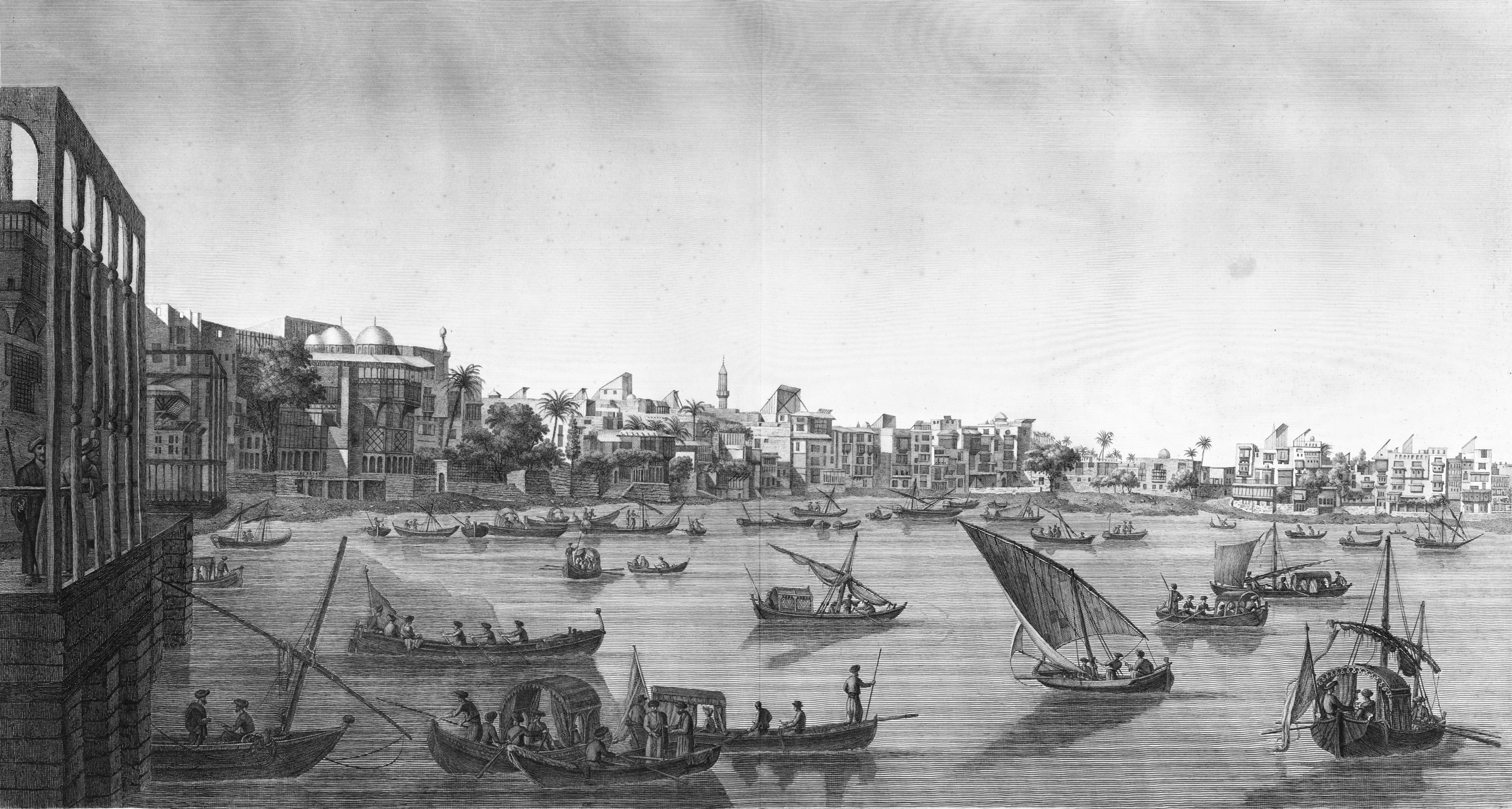
The area shown from the River in c.1800

The district of Azbakeya was built upon an area of an old Coptic village, Tiandonias (Coptic: ϯⲁⲛⲧⲱⲛⲓⲁⲥ) or Umm Dunayn (Arabic: ام دنين) which was also called al-Maks (Arabic: المكس "customs") in latter sources and Ottoman documents.

By the time of Barquq, the first Burji Mamluk sultan (1382–1399), a lot of reconstruction needed to be done within the walls of the city to repair the damage incurred as a result of the Black Death. In 1384, when Barquq started his madrasa in Bayn al-Qasrayn, the markets were rebuilt, and Khan al-Khalili, the most famous touristic market in Cairo, was established.

Al-Maqrizi showed that the northern cemetery, founded by al-Nasir Muhammad, contained no building at all before his third reign. When al-Nasir Muhammad in 1320 abandoned the area between Bab al-Nasr cemetery and the Muqattam, a small number of buildings started to be built in the northern cemetery.

Under the Burji Mamluks, northern cemetery became the new area targeted for the any new city expansion, since no ideological opposition was found preventing the construction of dwelling within cemeteries. The lack of opposition allowed the construction of striking religious buildings of monumental scale in the northern cemetery. Examples include the Khanqah of Faraj ibn Barquq, Madrasa of Al-Nasir Muhammad, the Emir Qurqumas Complex, the Mosque-Madrasa of Sultan al-Ashraf Barsbay and the Complex of Sultan al-Ashraf Qaytbay.

During the latter half of the 15th century, two final major transformations took place in Cairo: the port of Boulaq, and a district called Azbakeya in the northwest section of the city. The parameters of the city had been unchanged for the past 300 years according to a map done by the French expedition in 1798. With Baibars's conquest of Cyprus in 1428, Bulaq became the major port of Cairo. By the end of the 15th century, Bulaq was able to take the role as the major commercial port from Old Cairo.

The Azbakeya district was developed when Amir Azbak al-Yusufi, one of Qaytbay's princes, established stables and a residence of his own and excavated Birkat al-Azbakeya, which was fed from the Cairo Citadel Aqueduct. With the Arab's Gulf always serving as the western boundary of the city and feeding nearby ponds, flooding would occur during the summer. After each flood, the surrounding lands would be transformed into lush green areas. The beauty of the land in these area was exquisite and the upper class fought over each other for the first pick of land for the construction of their new palaces overlooking bodies of water like Birkat al Fīl "Elephant Pond" and Azbakeya Pond.

== Modern history ==
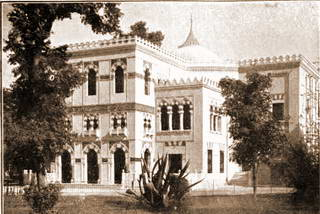
Azbakeya theater in 1928

The Egyptian Museum was established by the Egyptian government in 1835 near the Azbakeya Gardens. The museum soon moved to Boulaq in 1858 because the original building was too small to hold all the artifacts.

In the 1850s, the area was renovated during the rule of Isma'il Pasha in his plan to build a modern Cairo. Currently the well known Soor El Azbakeya (meaning the fence of Azbakeya) is a used books market that originated from a gathering of used book traders by the fence of the Azbakeya garden in 1926. (The market relocated to El Darasa in 1991 while a Metro station was being built, but returned to its original location in 1998).

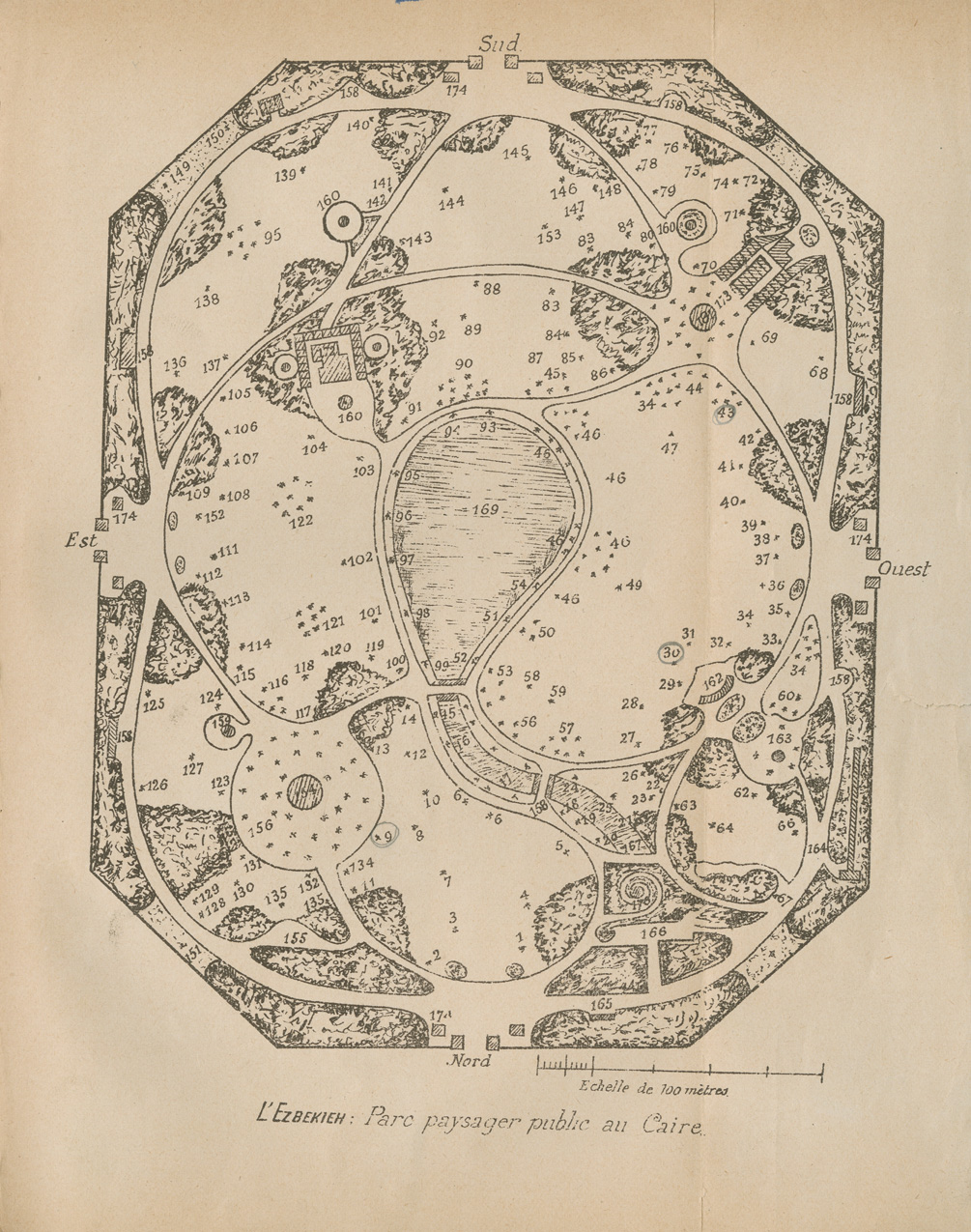
L'Ezbekieh – Parc paysager public au Caire

In the 19th century, the British referred to the area as the "Frank Quarter" and it was known for its European-style architecture and gardens, reflecting the presence of Europeans and other foreigners in Cairo (the term “Frank” was an Ottoman catch-all for Western Europeans). This was Cairo’s European business and diplomatic hub, with foreign consulates, banks, hotels, embassies, Western-style shops, it expanded west toward Ismailia Square (modern Tahrir).

By the late 19th century, the area became a center of entertainment, with the openings of cafes, bars, gambling halls, hashish dens and at least thirteen large entertainment venues. The Azbakeya gardens theater was the stage to most of the monthly concerts held by the famous Arab singer, Umm Kulthum. The Azbakeya gardens is only partially present now as two multi-story car parks have been built on large areas of the gardens.
