= Cairo International Book Fair =

Book fair in Cairo, Egypt

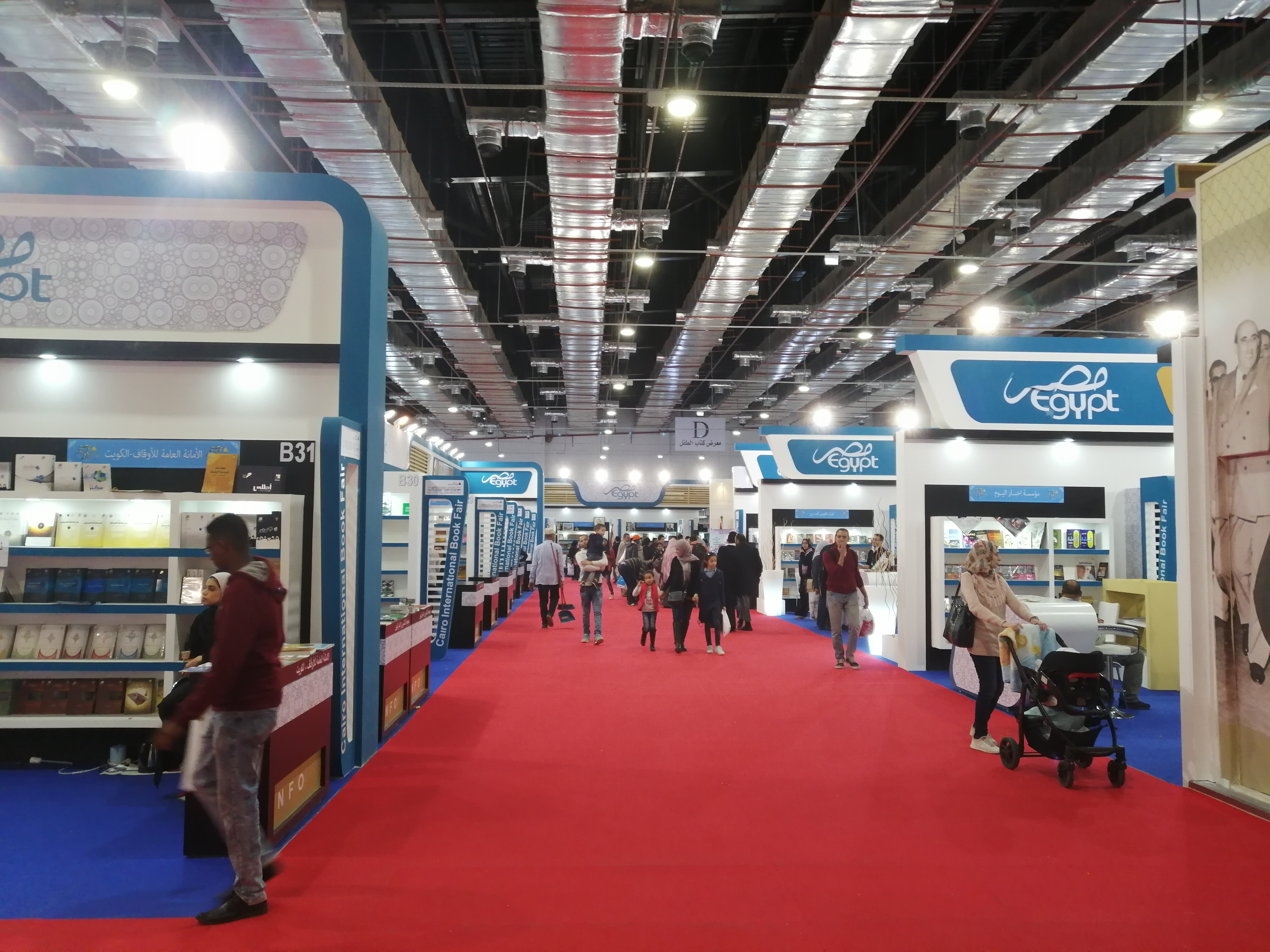
- Crowds walk among the thousands of titles available at the 50th Cairo International Book Fair, 26 January 2019.
- Status: Active
- Venue: Egypt International Exhibitions Center
- Location: New Cairo in Cairo
- Country: Egypt
- Inaugurated: 1969
- Attendance: 1,000,000–2,000,000 (estimated)
- Organizer: General Egyptian Book Organisation
- Website: cairobookfair.gebo.gov.eg

The Cairo International Book Fair is the largest and oldest book fair in the Arab world, held every year in the last week of January in Cairo, Egypt, at Egypt International Exhibitions Center in New Cairo, it is organised by the General Egyptian Book Organisation. The Fair is considered the most important event in the Arabic publishing world. It is one of the biggest book fairs in the world, with around two million visitors each year.

== Scale ==
The Cairo International Book Fair is one of the biggest book fairs in the world, drawing hundreds of book sellers from around the world and about 2 million visitors each year. It is the largest book fair in the Arab world, as well as the oldest. In 2006, it was the second largest book fair in the world after the Frankfurt Book Fair.

The fair is also notable as Cairo-based publishers produce an estimated three of five Arabic language books printed in the world, and the state owned General Egyptian Book Organisation—who coordinate the fair—is the largest book publisher in the Arab world. The fair features booths and speakers from private publishers and government agencies from around the world, as well as retailers of books, video, and other media. Lectures, readings, and other public events take place during the almost three weeks over which the book fair runs, and material is presented in Arabic, English, and other languages. The fair purposely appeals to ordinary Egyptians, with media on mainstream topics, outdoor events, and even fireworks to entertain the large crowds.

The CIBF was founded by the General Egyptian Book Organisation, a government publishers and retailers group, in 1969 to coincide with celebrations of the 1000th anniversary of the founding of the city of Cairo. Its 41st iteration was held from 21 January to 5 February 2009. In November 2018, the General Egyptian Book Organization declared that 100 new books will be published under the organization's name in the Cairo International Book Fair.

== Controversy ==
The CIBF has been marred in recent years by charges that leftist and Muslim militant authors, works critical of the government, and works featuring passages or topics deemed sexually or culturally controversial have been banned from presentation at the book fair. During the 2000 book fair, Islamist protests against books they deemed offensive erupted into violence. That year, over 2000 members of Muslim student groups protested outside Al-Azhar University, leading to rare public protests against the Egyptian government, violence, 75 arrests and a number of injuries. The students were protesting an Egyptian Ministry of Culture publisher printing and presenting for sale copies of the 1983 novel A Banquet for Seaweed by the Syrian writer Haidar Haidar. Following the protests, two members of the government printing house were also arrested for "disparaging religion" and publishing a work "offensive to public morals".

In following years a number of books presented by foreign publishers have been seized by Egyptian authorities. These have included works by Czech Milan Kundera, Moroccan Mohamed Choukri, Saudi Ibrahim Badi, Lebanese Hanan al-Sheikh, and fellow Lebanese novelist Elias Khoury In 2005, Egyptian police arrested a number of book sellers and activists at the book fair, charging two Egyptian journalists with "disseminating false propaganda against the government" and others for presenting an avowedly socialist work.

The Fair was canceled in January 2011 due to the 2011 Egyptian revolution. The Fair returned in 2012 and "Nearly all of the new books, seminars, poetry recitals, theatrical shows and performances by different troupes at the Fair, in one way or another, seem to depict and celebrate the Arab Spring and the Egyptians' revolt."

== See also ==
- Riyadh International Book Fair, where censorship-related controversy has also been common
