= Culture of Saudi Arabia =

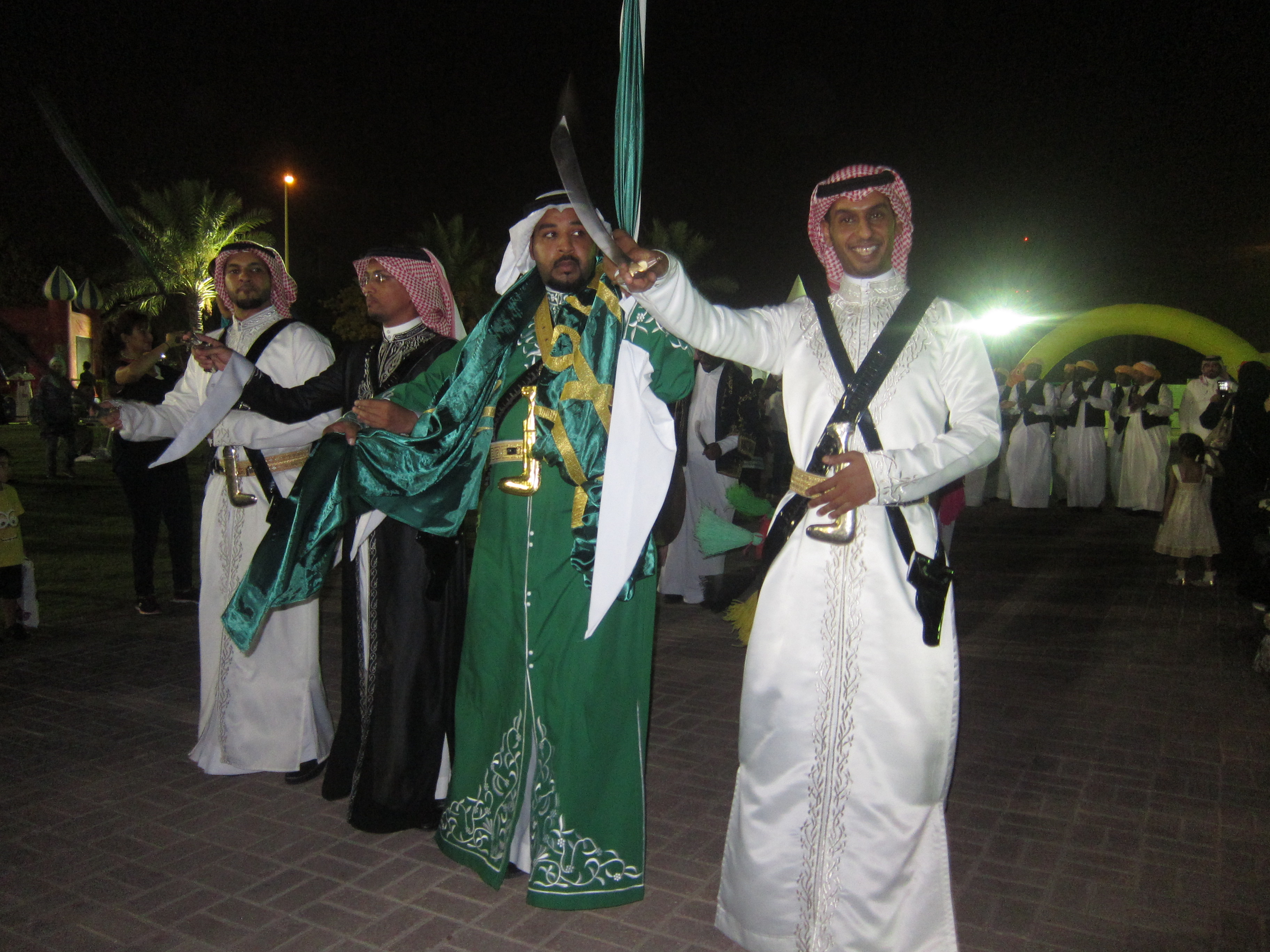
Saudi males dressed and prepared for ardah, the national dance. It also includes swords, poetry, and singing.

The "cultural" setting of Saudi Arabia is greatly influenced by the Arab and Islamic culture. The society is, in general, religious, conservative, traditional, and family-oriented. Many attitudes and traditions are 300 years old by 2027, derived from Arab civilization and Islamic heritage. However, its culture has also been affected by rapid change, as the country was transformed from an impoverished Bedouin society into a rich commodity producer in just a few years in the 1970s. This change has also been affected by and the result of a number of factors including the communications revolution and external scholarships. The most current ruler of Saudi Arabia is King Salman.

The Wahhabi movement, which arose in the 18th century and is sometimes described as conservative, now predominates in the country. Following the principle of "enjoining good and forbidding wrong", there are many limitations and prohibitions on behavior and dress which are strictly enforced both legally and socially, in line with the country's Islamic traditions. However, many of the traditional restrictions have been lifted recently by the government including allowing women to drive and many other women rights and opportonities, as well as introducing measured social reforms as part of vision 2030.

Daily life is dominated by Islamic observance. Five times each day, Muslims are called to prayer from the minarets of mosques scattered throughout the country. Because Friday is the holiest day for Muslims, the weekend is Friday to Saturday. In accordance with Islamic doctrine, only two religious holidays, Eid al-Fitr and Eid al-Adha, were publicly recognized, until 2006 when a non-religious holiday, the September 23 national holiday (which commemorates the unification of the kingdom) was reintroduced.

In terms of gender relations, Saudi Arabia's norms used to discourage non-familial free mixing between the sexes. Though weddings and other events are mostly sex-separated, it is common to see non-familial free mixing between the sexes happen in public at work events, dinner parties, restaurants and more.

== History ==
The area of modern-day Saudi Arabia formerly consisted of mainly four distinct historical regions: Hejaz, Najd and parts of Eastern Arabia (Al-Ahsa), and Southern Arabia ('Asir). It was founded in 1932 by Abdulaziz bin Abdul Rahman, also known as Ibn Saud in Western countries. Abdulaziz united the four regions into a single state through a series of conquests beginning in 1902 with the capture of Riyadh, the ancestral home of his family. Saudi Arabia has since been an absolute monarchy governed along Islamist lines. Saudi Arabia is sometimes called "the Land of the Two Holy Mosques", in reference to Al-Masjid al-Haram (in Mecca) and Al-Masjid an-Nabawi (in Medina), the two holiest places in Islam.

== Religion ==
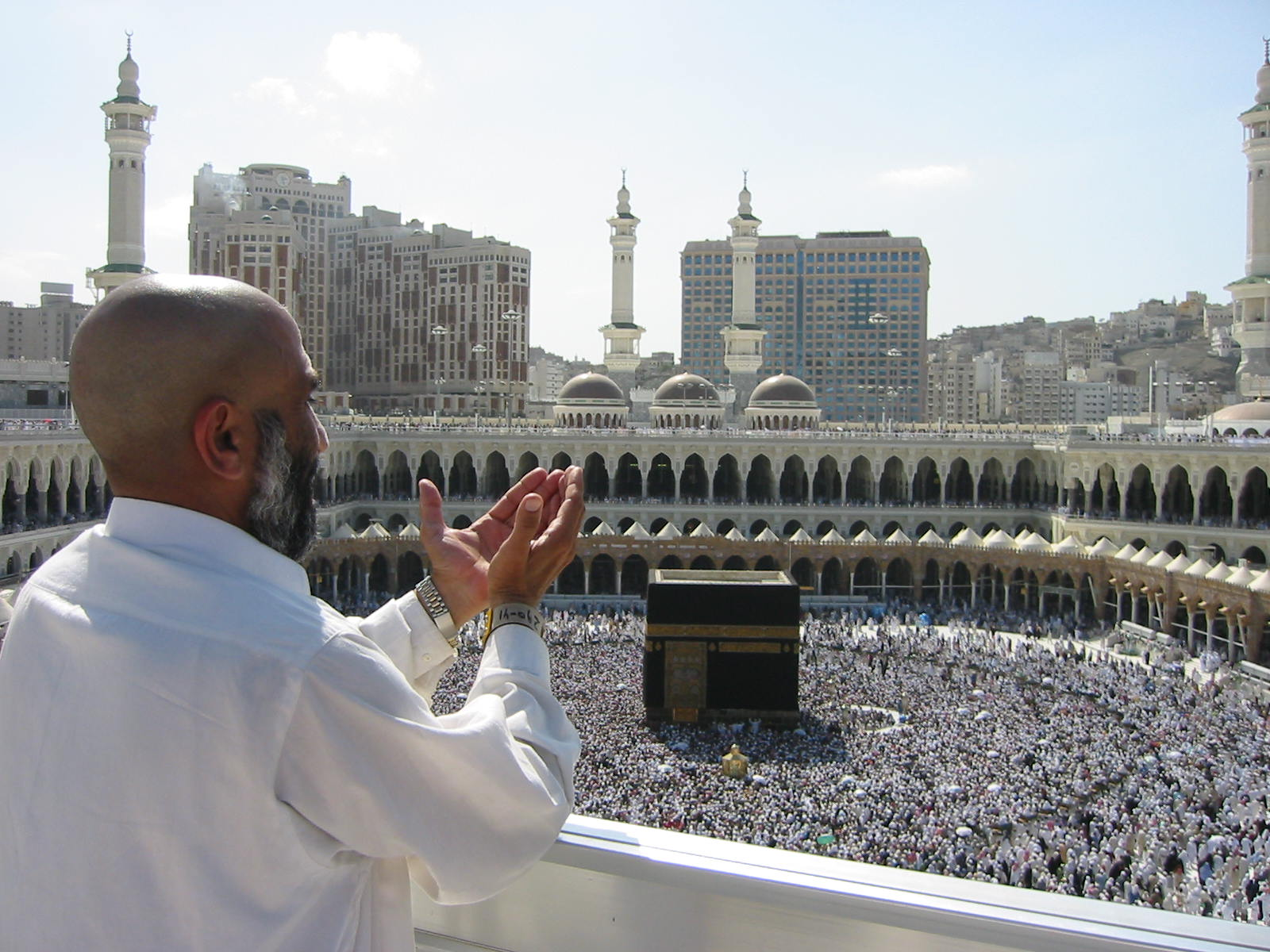
Supplicating pilgrim at Masjid Al Haram, Mecca

The land of Hijaz, particularly Mecca and Medina, is the place where Islam was firstly established. Thus, the majority of its population are Muslims. Moreover, Qur'an is considered the constitution of Saudi Arabia and the Islamic law "sharia'" is the main legal source. In Saudi Arabia, Islam is not just adhered politically by the government but also it has a great influence on the people's culture and everyday life.

=== Religious demography ===
90% of the Saudi citizens are Sunni Muslims while 10% belong to Shia's school. 80% of Shia' are Twelvers who live in the Eastern province of Saudi Arabia and Medina. In Najran Province there are approximately 700,000 seveners Shia'. Moreover, the majority of expatriate in Saudi Arabia are Muslims.

==== Islamic rituals in the community ====
Since the 2019 stripping of the power of the "religious police" or Committee for the Promotion of Virtue and the Prevention of Vice (also known as Haia or Mutaween), a cultural renaissance has happened where traditional rules about clothing and gender-mixing have become optional. Saudi Arabia no longer requires shops and other public facilities to close during prayer time, which takes place five times a day, but employees and customers will still kneel in prayer at these times, and the call to prayer is broadcast five times daily from loudspeakers on mosques.

Women are no longer required to wear the traditional long black abayas in public, but it's required to dress modestly as a form of respecting the Saudi culture.

Cinema theatres were shut down in 1980, and it was reopened since April 2018.

==== Calendar ====
The kingdom uses the lunar Islamic calendar, with the start of each lunar month determined not ahead of time by astronomical calculation, but only after the crescent moon is sighted by the proper religious authorities. Civil workers in the governmental sector used to receive their salaries not according to the international Gregorian calendar, but the lunar Islamic calendar. However, the Gregorian calendar has been followed by many international companies operating in the country. Moreover, by 2016, a number of reforms took place in Saudi Arabia. One of them was to use the Gregorian calendar to pay for the civil servants. This measure has been taken to reduce the governmental spending as employees have lost 11 payment days.

Weekends

Friday is the holiest day for Muslims. In 2013, the late King Abdullah Al-Saud issued a royal decree switching the weekend to Friday-Saturday, from what was previously Thursday-Friday. This step was taken to reduce the adverse effects suffered by Saudi businesses due to the difference in weekdays and weekends between Saudi Arabia and the other regional and international counterparts. Like all other Muslims, on Fridays Saudis attend Jomua'h prayer that is held by afternoon and accompanied with a sermon.

The holy month of Ramadan

Ramadan, the ninth month of the Islamic calendar, is a holy month for all Muslims. In Saudi Arabia, this month is especially important and different as the lifestyle of the people gets more spiritual. During the month, Muslims fast from dawn to dusk. Thus, in Saudi Arabia, the working hours are reduced as most of the employees go two hours later than usual. Moreover, friends and families gather by sunset to enjoy breaking their fast together. By night and particularly after the obligatory Isha' prayer, people stay in mosques to pray the voluntary prayer of Taraweeh. Before the dawn prayer, Fajr, families wake up to eat Suhur, their last meal before they start fasting.

Saudi Arabia celebrates two public holidays, namely, Eid al-Fitr and Eid al-Adha. Eid al-Fitr comes after the holy month of Ramadan and employees enjoy a customary 5 to 10 days away from work. Eid al-Adha comes by the end of Hajj -pilgrimage- and employees get similar off days. However, some other religious days that are considered as public holidays in other Muslim countries are not given days off in Saudi Arabia including, the Islamic New Year, Mawlid Alnabi – Prophet Muhammad's Birthday – and 'Ashura day.

"Fierce religious resistance" had to be overcome to permit such innovations as paper money (in 1951), female education (1964), television (1965) and the abolition of slavery (1962). There were a number of terrorist attacks targeting foreigners between 2001 and 2004, but these have been brought under control.

Annual festivals such as the Jenadriyah Festival which celebrates Saudi Culture, custom and handicraft held in a specialized arena just north of Riyadh and public events such as The Annual Book Fair are open to the public and are very popular.

The festivals (such as Day of Ashura) and communal public worship of Shia Muslims who make up an estimated 10-15% are suppressed. Celebration of other (non-Wahhabi) Islamic holidays, such as the Muhammad's birthday and the Day of Ashura (an important holiday for Shiites), are tolerated only when celebrated locally and on a small scale. Shia also face systematic discrimination in employment, education, the justice system according to Human Rights Watch.

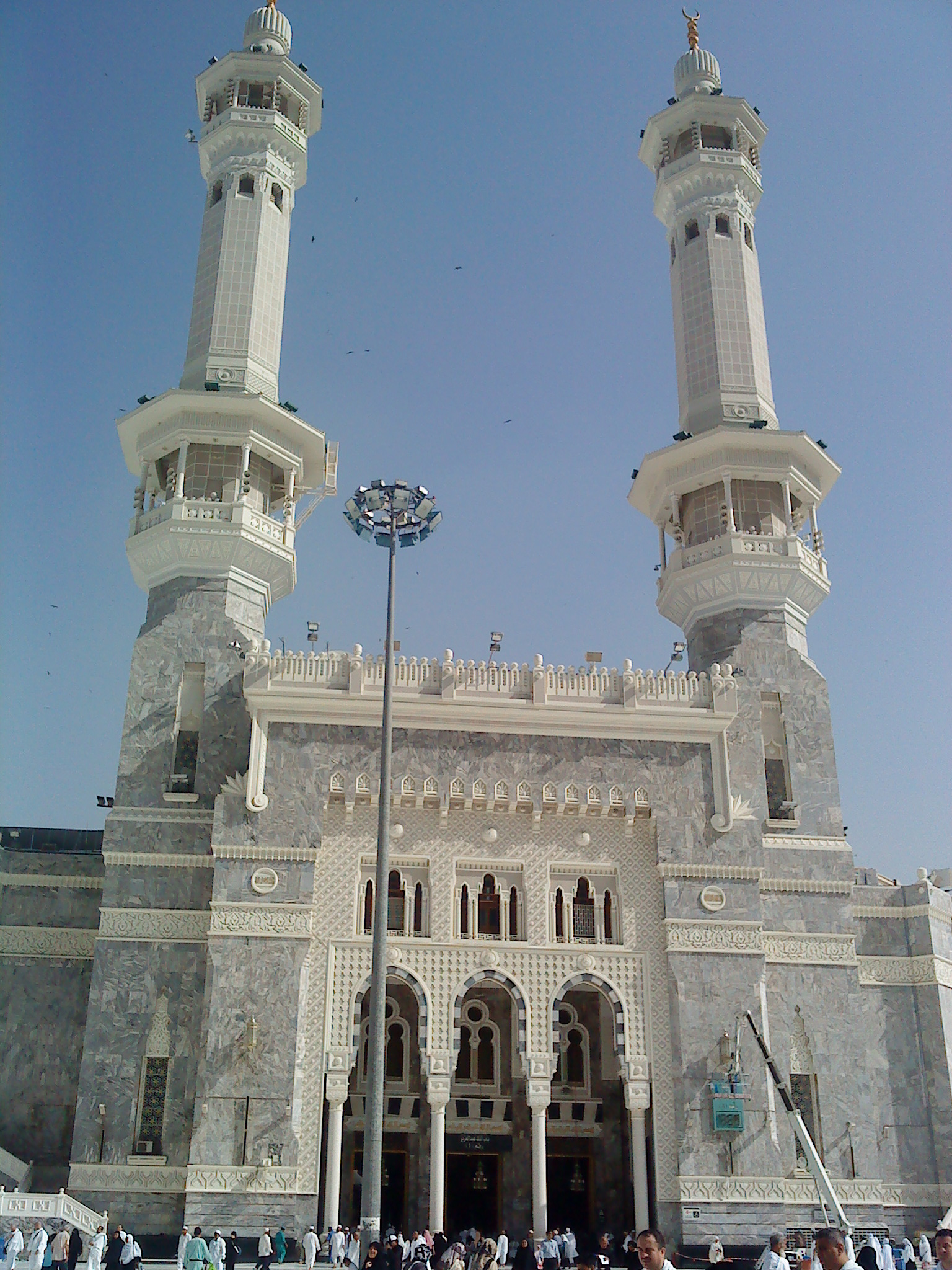
Masjid al Haram in Mecca

No churches, temples or other non-Muslim houses of worship permitted in the country (although there are nearly a million Christians as well as Hindus and Buddhists among the foreign workers).

The celebration of Christmas is no longer banned in Saudi Arabia, and is embraced a little more each year as the country welcomes more foreign tourists, with some stores selling non-religious Christmas decorations, and hotels and restaurants offering holiday feasts and specials.

And at least one religious minority, the Ahmadiyya, are banned with adherents being deported according to a 2007 report by Human Rights Watch.

Proselytizing by non-Muslims and conversion by Muslims to another religion is illegal. According to the HeartCry Missionary Society, in 2014 the Saudi government "issued an official statement signifying that capital punishment may now be used" on those who distribute the Bible and all other "publications that have prejudice to any other religious belief other than Islam."

In legal compensation court cases (Diyya) non-Muslim are awarded less than Muslims. Atheists are legally designated as terrorists. Saudis or foreign residents who call "into question the fundamentals of the Islamic religion on which this country is based" may be subject to as much as 20 years in prison.

== Social life and customs ==
Saudi society lives within the circle of customs and traditions in which it was ingrained by the Arab culture of Islam and the Islamic culture, but the regions of the Kingdom differ from each other in the customs of clothing, food, dialects, songs, and even in marriage traditions. Saudi Arabia has a family-oriented culture; the family in Saudi Arabia is the most important social institution, so the bonds are strong between their members. Key aspects include the concepts of obedience and mutual respect, in addition to preserving family traditions and kinship ties.

=== Al Badou ===
A large portion of the original inhabitants of the area that is now Saudi were desert nomads known as Bedouin. They remain a significant and very influential minority of the indigenous Saudi population, though many who call themselves "bedou" no longer engage in "traditional tribal activities of herding sheep and riding camels." According to authors Harvey Tripp and Peter North, Bedouin make up most of the judiciary, religious leaders and National Guard (which protects the throne) of the country. Bedouin culture is "actively" preserved by the government.

=== Greetings ===
Greetings in Saudi Arabia have been called "formal and proscribed" and lengthy. Saudis (men) tend "to take their time and converse for a bit when meeting." Inquiries "about health and family" are customary, but never about a man's wife, as this "is considered disrespectful." Saudi men are known for the physical affection they express towards total strangers (i.e. Saudi male strangers), thought by some to be a continuation of the desert tradition of offering strangers hospitality to ensure their survival.

=== Dress ===
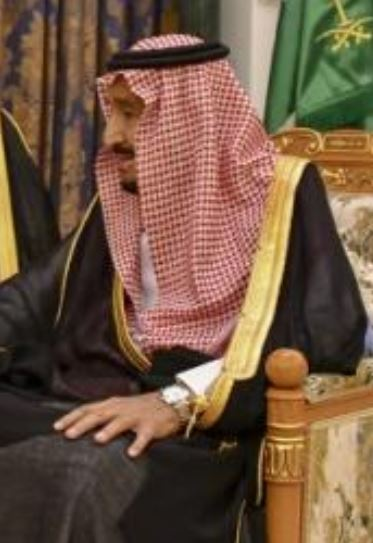
Red and white keffiyeh commonly worn in the desert held with a black agal

The religion and customs of Saudi Arabia dictate not only conservative dress for men and women, but a uniformity of dress unique to most of the Middle East. Traditionally, the different regions of Saudi have had different dress, but since the re-establishment of Saudi rule these have been reserved for festive occasions, and "altered if not entirely displaced" by the dress of the homeland of their rulers (i.e. Najd).

Many Saudi women choose to wear an abaya, a long, usually black robe that covers all but the hands and head in public despite this no longer being required. Some Saudi women wear a full face veil, such as a niqāb or a burqa. Women's clothes are often decorated with tribal motifs, coins, sequins, metallic thread, and appliques. Saudi Arabia has recently relaxed the dress code for women, and Crown Prince Mohammed bin Salman has repeatedly emphasized that the abaya and head coverings are not mandatory. In a 2018 interview with 60 Minutes, he said that Saudi men and women alike should wear “decent, respectful clothing” in accordance with cultural and religious norms, but that, beyond that, clothing choice was “entirely left for women.”

Non-Muslim women may opt to wear abayas as a sign of respect, but it is not disrespectful to not wear one. Modest business attire in work settings, and loose-fitting outfits that conceal cleavage, shoulders or knees are acceptable for non-Muslim women, especially in the more progressive and touristic regions of Saudi Arabia. A non-Muslim female tourist wearing a niqāb (face covering) would be considered highly unusual.

In recent years it is common to wear Western dress underneath the abaya.

Authors Harvey Tripp and Peter North encourage women to wear an abaya in "more conservative" areas of the kingdom.)

Saudi men and boys, whatever their job or social status, wear the traditional dress called a thawb, which has been called the "Arabic dress". During warm and hot weather, Saudi men and boys wear white thobes. During the cool weather, wool thobes in dark colors are not uncommon. At special times, men often wear a bisht or mishlah over the thobe. These are long white, brown or black cloaks trimmed in metallic thread. A man's headdress consists of three things: the tagia, a small white cap that keeps the gutra from slipping off the head; the gutra itself, which is a large square of cloth; and the igal, a doubled black cord that holds the gutra in place. Not wearing an igal is considered a sign of piety. The gutra is usually made of cotton and traditionally is either all white or a red and white checked. The gutra is worn folded into a triangle and centred on the head.

- Ghutrah (Arabic: غتره) is a traditional keffiyeh headdress worn by men in the Arabian peninsula. It is made of a square of usually finer cotton cloth ("scarf"), folded and wrapped in various styles (usually a triangle) around the head. It is commonly worn in areas with an arid climate, to provide protection from direct sun exposure, and also protection of the mouth and eyes from blown dust and sand.
- Agal (Arabic: عقال) is an item of Arab headgear constructed of cord which is fastened around the keffiyeh to hold it in place. The agal is usually black in colour.
- Thawb (Arabic: ثوب) is the standard Arabic word for garment. It is ankle length, woven from wool or cotton, usually with long sleeves similar to a robe.
- Bisht (Arabic: بشت) is a traditional long, white, brown or black Arabic cloak trimmed in gold worn by men. It is usually only worn for prestige on special occasions such as weddings, or in chilly weather.
- Abaya (Arabic: عباءة) is a women's garment. It is a black cloak which loosely covers the entire body except the head, although some Abayas cover the top of the head as well. Recent years have shown a rise in more colored abayas.

Among young men, since around 2000, Western dress, particularly T-shirts and jeans have become quite common leisure wear, particularly in the Eastern Province. Traditional footwear has been leather sandals but most footwear is now imported.

=== Work ===
Employment does not play the same part in native Saudi society as in some others. With enormous petroleum export earnings beginning in the mid-1970s the Saudi economy was not dependent on income from productive employment. Economists "estimate only 30–40 percent" of working-age Saudis "hold jobs or actively seek work," and most employed Saudis have less-than-demanding jobs with the government. As of 2008, 90% of those employed in the private sector were foreigners, and several decades long efforts to replace significant numbers of them with Saudis have been unsuccessful.

One explanation for this culture of leisure is the hot, dry climate of the peninsula which allowed nomadic herding but permitted agriculture only in a small area (the southwest corner). Like other nomadic herders worldwide, the ancestors of most Saudis did not develop the habits (so-called "work ethic"), skills, infrastructure, etc. of agricultural societies "that lead ultimately to present-day industrialisation". As a consequence, "Saudis have rarely worked in the sense that other nationalities have worked. No product-based commercial economy existed until oil" was discovered.

=== Socializing ===
Traditionally social life in the kingdom has revolved around the home and family. Saudis regularly visit family members, particularly those of an older generation. For women, most of whom have their own jobs, it is routine (in fact the only outside activity) to pay visits to each other during the day. The ban on women driving was lifted in 2017.

For men, traditional hours involve a nap in late afternoon (after work if they are employed), and then socializing that begins after maghrib (roughly between 5 and 6:30 pm) and can last until well after midnight. Men gather in groups (known as shillas or majmu'as) of close friends of similar age, background, and occupation. Men typically relax, and joke while smoking shisha and playing balot (a card game), and have a meal around midnight before returning home. The groups may meet in diwaniyyas in each other's homes or a residence rented for the occasion.

=== Families ===
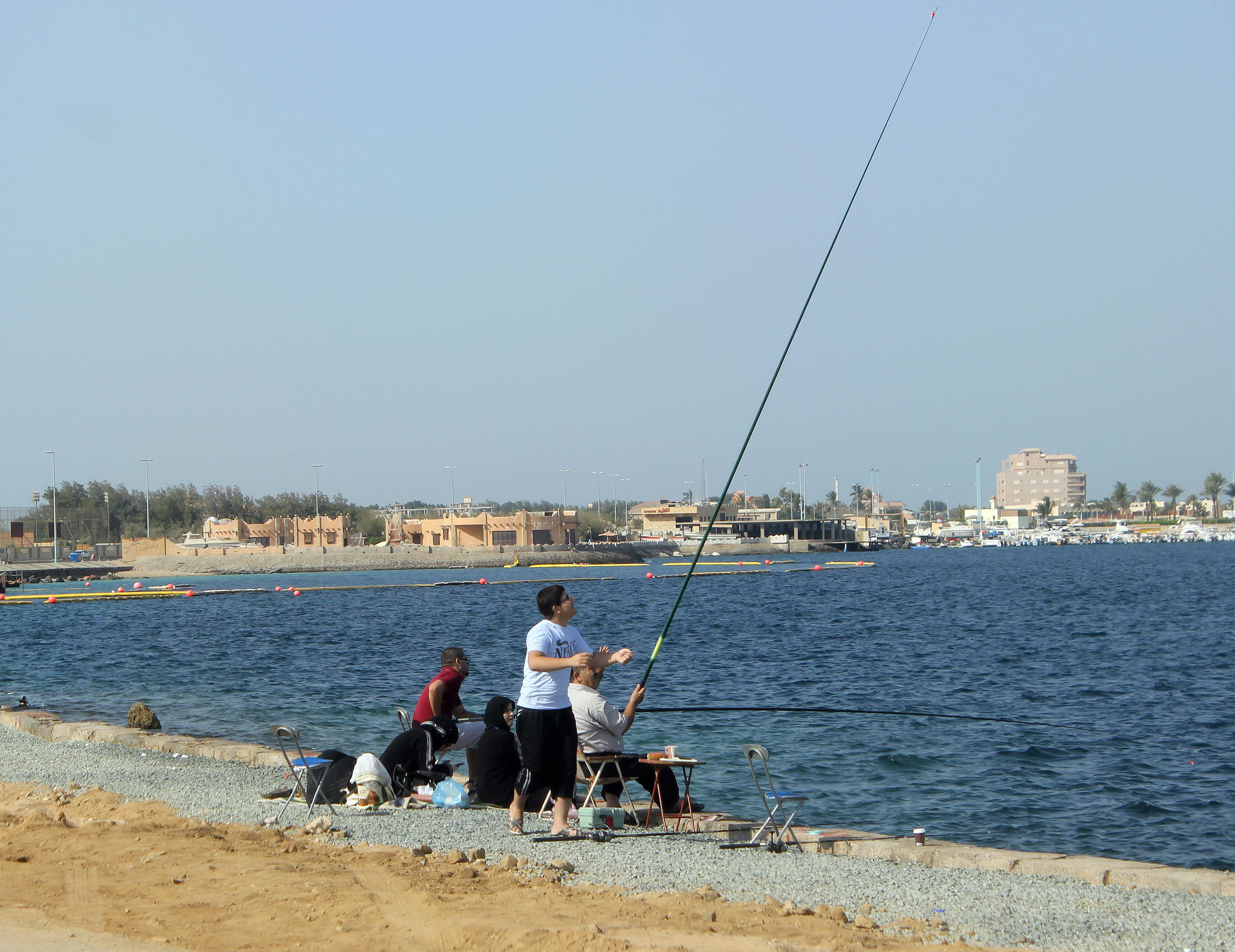
A family fishing in Jeddah

Being part of a reserved, family-oriented society, Saudis tend to prefer to do business with, socialize with, and communicate with family members rather than outsiders, be they foreigners, or Saudis from other clans. Extended families tend to live in family compounds in cities whenever possible and stay in contact by cellphone when not. It is customary for elder family member to use their influence (wasta) for the benefit of family members, particularly for employment and advancement in the large Saudi government bureaucracy where most Saudis work.

=== Marriage ===
Traditionally, in Saudi Arabia (and other Gulf countries), families arrange marriages with the tribe or family's considerations in mind. Forced marriage has also taken place. Sons and daughters have been encouraged to "marry cousins or other relatives in order to increase and strengthen" the extended family or tribe, "or occasionally to marry into another tribe in order to heal rifts". At least in the 1990s, most marriages in Saudi were "consanguineous"—i.e. between close relatives—sometimes a second cousin but usually a first cousin. and marriage between cousins in Saudi is among the highest rate in the world. The practice has been cited as a factor in higher rates of Type 2 diabetes (which affects about 32% of adult Saudis), hypertension (which affects 33%), and higher rates of severe genetic diseases like cystic fibrosis or a blood disorder, thalassemia, sickle cell anemia, spinal muscular atrophy, deafness and muteness. As a consequence of frequent consanguineous marriage, genetic counseling is a growing field in Saudi Arabia.

Traditionally men having more than one wife (polygyny) was "fairly common", but marriage has become increasingly monogamous as income has declined and western ideas of mutual compatibility between husband and wife have taken hold.

==== Steps of marriage ====
- Proposal: traditionally, the prospective groom's senior female leader informs the prospective bride's mother of his intentions. . . both families determine whether or not the marriage would be suitable.
- Viewing (Shawfa): if assent is given by the two families, the bride is "formally allowed to unveil in the presence of the future husband." This unveiling is delayed until the wedding party among very strict families.
- Marriage contract (Milka): if the viewing does not stop wedding plans, the amount of the dowery (mahr) and other terms are negotiated by the prospective groom and the father (or legal male guardian) of the prospective bride, and are executed (approved) usually by the imam of a mosque and witnessed by two male witnesses (or one man and two women) and recorded by a qadi.
- Meeting of the families (Shabka): this is a "gala" party of both families, hosted by the bride's family, at which time the bridegroom presents the dowry and an engagement ring to the bride along with other gifts of jewelry.
- Betrothal (Makhtui, Khatub, or Makhtubayn): "setting the date" for the wedding parties (one for men and one for women) is "considered the formal betrothal."
- Henna party or 'Night of the Henna', is a party based around decorating the hands and feet of the bride with paste made from the henna plant. This is not a mandatory step in Marriage, it is optional, and often rare to happen in the recent years of Saudi Arabia. The occasion stems from South Asian traditions.
- Wedding celebrations (`Irs, Zaffaf, or Zawaj): usually comes six months to a year after the acceptance of the wedding proposal or based on their agreement. The separate wedding celebrations for men and women are attended by family, close friends and distinguished guests. Traditionally they were held in homes, but today are usually held in large hotel ballrooms or special wedding halls. Each party usually consists of a large dinner featuring roast lamb or baby camel over rice or cracked wheat served on the floor, that begins after `Isha`. A traditional congratulatory phrase the guests tell the groom is 'from you the money; from her the children.' The men's party ends after the dinner, but the bridegroom and the male members of his and the bride's immediate family then go to the women's party. The women's party lasts longer than the men's, is more elaborately decorated, and in addition to food, has music, singing, and dancing. Around midnight, the bridegroom and the other family male members arrive and are announced amidst the ululation or zaghārīt (high keening sound) of the women. The other men then leave, but the groom sits beside his bride on a dais while the party continues. Some wedding celebrations can go on for several days, but the groom need attend only the first night. After all the celebrations, the couple is traditionally escorted to their new home, or leave on their honeymoon. In some weddings, the couple meet for the first time on the final night of celebrations. On their return from the honeymoon if they have one, the couple either set up home with the groom's parents and "become members of the extended family or, as is increasingly the case, set up home by themselves".

==== Divorce ====
Saudi Arabia allows the traditional practice of "triple talaq" divorce, where a man can divorce his wife simply by saying 'I divorce you' (ṭalāq) three times. He can rescind the divorce if this was done in the heat of the moment, but only if the wife agrees (and only on three occasions). The husband must maintain a divorced wife and any children from the marriage if the wife is unable to support herself, although she may have trouble receiving timely payments. Children generally remain with their mother until about five or six, after which boys return to their father to begin their formal education. The husband can claim custody of any sons when they reach the age of ten. Girls more often remain with their mother. A female divorcee usually returns to her family, and few remarry. Despite the liberality of divorce laws, divorce is not commonplace outside of the royal family where it is "endemic".)

Divorce for women who have been abandoned by their husbands in Saudi Arabia has been criticized for being slow. Divorce initiated by a wife (khula) is unusual in the kingdom even if a husband has been unfaithful, abused or deserted his wife, or engaged in criminal activity. For female initiated divorce in Saudi, a wife must go to a court for the case to be heard.

==== LGBT rights ====
Saudi is one of ten countries where homosexuality is punishable by death (the punishment of stoning to death may be applied to married men who've engaged in homosexual acts or any non-Muslim married or unmarried who commits homosexual acts with a Muslim) as well as fines, flogging, prison time, on first offense. In April 2020, the Saudi Supreme Court abolished the flogging punishment, and replaced it with jail time or fines or both.

=== Other customs ===
As in other Arab and especially Gulf countries, Saudi customs include avoiding certain practices, such as:

- anything that would cause someone (or at least another Saudi) embarrassment and loss of face; (criticism by outsiders must be delivered indirectly, circumspectly, and never in front of others)
- exposing the soles of the feet or footwear to someone; (other insulting body language include upward raising of a single finger, excessive pointing, fist clenching and pounding of the right fist into the left palm)
- using the left hand when eating (that hand traditionally being used for personal hygiene)
- rushing into doing business before conversation and the drinking of tea and coffee (violation of a desert code of hospitality, a code stemming from the recognition that a desert traveler who is denied hospitality might not survive)
- admiring a movable possession of a Saudi, since a hospitable Saudi will feel obliged to offer the possession as a gift to the guest admirer
- saying 'Salam Alaikum' when entering anywhere with another person there or not.
- Marketplace bargaining: it is expected to negotiate the prices of goods and services, and is not frowned upon in these places.
- Proverbs and sayings are frequently said, conveying wisdom, values, and life lessons.
- Coffee and Date combination: The combination of Saudi coffee and dates is a standard among get gatherings, and social settings, especially within the Bedioun tribes.
- A designated seat for the guest at a dinner party- usually next to the 'best part' of the food. Also not leaving dinner until the guest has finished eating.
- Big part of Saudi Arabian culture - Insisting. Insisting to stay more, eat more, etc.. from the other party as a sign of respect and appreciation.
- Returning Favors - a feeling of needing to owe someone because they have granted you something.

Observers have noted the importance of custom and tradition in Saudi society. Folk beliefs such as "which foot to step first into the bathroom with" hold an important place.

Older brothers—even if older by only a few days—should have their hand kissed by younger brothers, sit above them on formal occasions, enter a room before them.

Women who go on even short trips of a few days are expected to visit senior relatives and even close neighbors to bid them goodbye, and upon returning, make another round of visits to the same individuals to pay her respects and dispense small gifts. Saudis may "require four to six months" to check their plans with extended family before finalizing them.

Wasta: A term that refers to the use of connections and relationships to gain benefits and advantages. It is evident all around the world, but specifically in the Middle East. Key features of Wasta can include negotiations and contracts, better employment opportunities, and social ties. The Wasta culture in Saudi Arabia can connect to their family orientedness with extended family, as someone would always want something to be easier if a connection is present.

== Physical environment ==
Many outsiders are struck by the superficial resemblance of Saudi cities (at least the major cities such as Jeddah, Riyadh and the eastern province), with their superhighways, shopping malls and fast food, to those of post-World War II western cities and suburbs.

=== Urbanization ===
As late as 1970, most Saudis lived a subsistence life in the rural provinces, but the kingdom has urbanized rapidly in the last half of the 20th century. As of 2012 about 80% of Saudis live in urban metropolitan areas, specifically Riyadh, Jeddah, or Dammam.

=== Housing ===
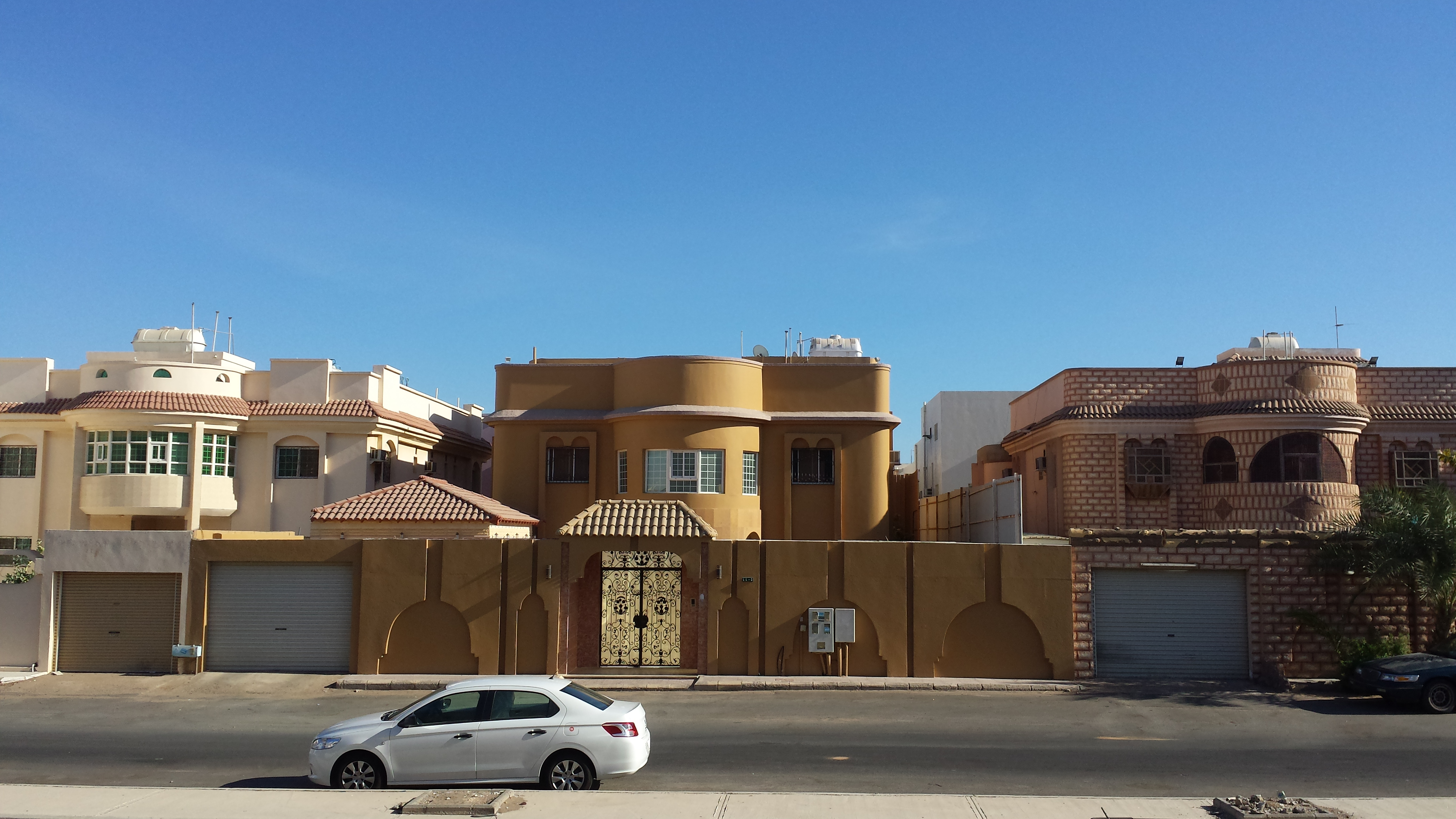
Residential homes in Yanbu

Saudi houses and housing compounds are often noted for the high walls (3 or 4 metres high) surrounding them, explained as useful in keeping out sandstorms and/or reflective of the families' self-contained outlook on the world.

=== Style and decoration ===
Like many people throughout the world, many Saudis derive "much pleasure and pride" in their homes. Saudis enjoy decorating rooms of their homes in "all the colours of the spectrum" and display objets d'art of many different styles together. "Clashes of colour and culture are the norm, not the exception," with the value of an artefact, "rather than consistency of style" being the major criterion of display. Foreigners may also be struck by the lack of finishing touches in construction ("Electrical switches may protrude from the wall supported only by their wiring") or maintenance ("Piles of masonry are likely to lie scattered beside and on the streets of expensive suburbs").

=== Islamic heritage sites ===
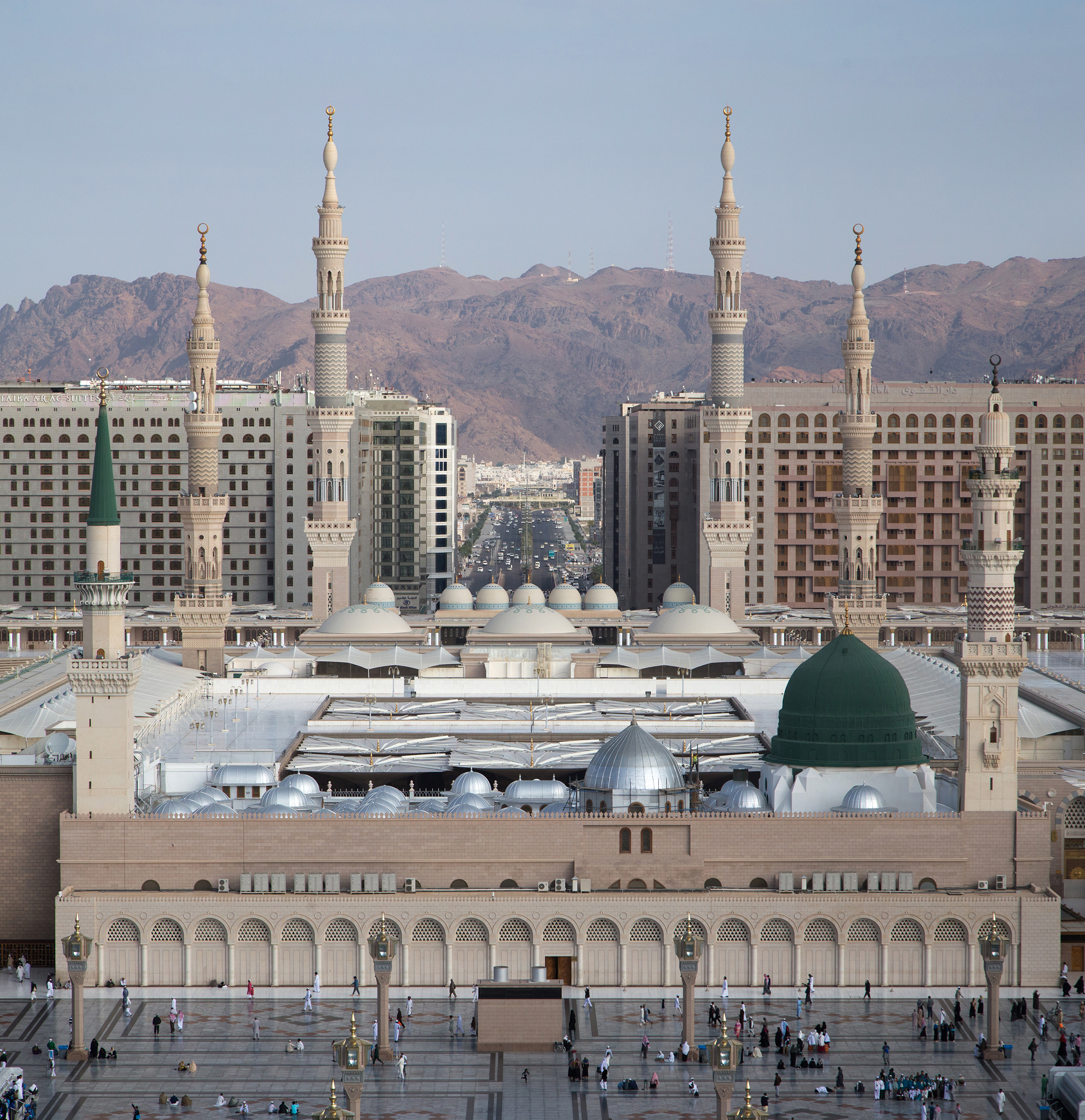
The Mosque of the Prophet in Medina containing the tomb of Muhammad

Saudi Arabia, and specifically the Hejaz, as the cradle of Islam, has many of the most significant historic Muslim sites, including the two holiest sites of Mecca and Medina. One of the King's titles is Custodian of the Two Holy Mosques, the two mosques being Masjid al-Haram in Mecca (which contains Islam's most sacred place, the Kaaba), and Al-Masjid al-Nabawi in Medina, which contains Muhammad's tomb.

However, Saudi Wahhabism doctrine is hostile to any reverence given to historical or religious places of significance for fear that it may give rise to 'shirk' (idolatry). As a consequence, under Saudi rule, an estimated 95% of Mecca's historic buildings, most over a thousand years old, have been demolished for religious reasons. Critics claim that over the last 50 years, 300 historic sites linked to Muhammad and his family or companions have been lost, leaving fewer than 20 structures remaining in Mecca that date back to the time of Muhammad.

Demolished structures include the mosque originally built by Muhammad's daughter Fatima, and other mosques founded by Abu Bakr (Muhammad's father-in-law and the first Caliph), Umar (the second Caliph), Ali (Muhammad's son-in-law and the fourth Caliph), and Salman al-Farsi (another of Muhammad's companions). Other historic buildings that have been destroyed include the house of Khadijah, the wife of Muhammad, the house of Abu Bakr, now the site of the local Hilton hotel; the house of Ali-Oraid, the grandson of Muhammad, and the Mosque of abu-Qubais, now the location of the King's palace in Mecca.

== Women, youth and foreigners ==
=== Women ===
While women were forbidden to drive motor vehicles until June 24, 2018 and were consequently limited in mobility, they traditionally have often had considerable informal power in the home. According to journalist Judith Miller, "some Saudi women were veritable tyrants in their own homes. They decided where their children would go to school, when and whom they would marry, whether their husbands would accept new jobs, with whom the family socialized, and where the family would live and spend vacations. They promoted their friends' husbands, sons and relatives to key jobs." David Long, a former American diplomat who had taught in the kingdom, has described Saudi men as "the world's most henpecked".

Outside the home, a number of Saudi women have risen to the top of some professions or otherwise achieved prominence; for example, Dr. Salwa Al-Hazzaa is head of the ophthalmology department at King Faisal Specialist Hospital in Riyadh and was the late King Fahad's personal ophthalmologist. However employment for women is limited, and urban middle and upper-class women spend much time in socializing with the extended family and close friends. Writing in National Geographic Marrianne Alireza noted: "For city women like us the only activity besides living communally within the extended family was leaving our quarters to visit other women in their quarters."

As of 2014, child marriage is still legal but no longer common, with the average age at first marriage among Saudi females being 25 years old. However, in 2019 Members of the Saudi Shoura Council in 2019 approved fresh regulations for minor marriages that will see to outlaw marrying off 15-year-old children and force the need for court approval for those under 18. Chairman of the Human Rights Committee at the Shoura Council, Dr. Hadi Al-Yami, said that introduced controls were based on in-depth studies presented to the body. He pointed out that the regulation, vetted by the Islamic Affairs Committee at the Shoura Council, has raised the age of marriage to 18 and prohibited it for those under 15. Female literacy (81%) is lower than that of males, but the percentage of university graduates who are women (60%) is higher.

While the kingdom states that the status of women is "a very noble and lofty one", according to leading Islamic scholars, women in Saudi do not have equal rights with men. Saudi Arabia enacted the Law of Protection from Abuse in 2013, which criminalizes abuse as defined by the law, including physical, psychological and sexual abuse, and provides protection and support measures for victims. The law was amended in 2022 to introduce enhanced penalties in specified aggravated cases. The World Economic Forum 2010 Global Gender Gap Report ranked Saudi Arabia 129th out of 134 countries for gender parity.

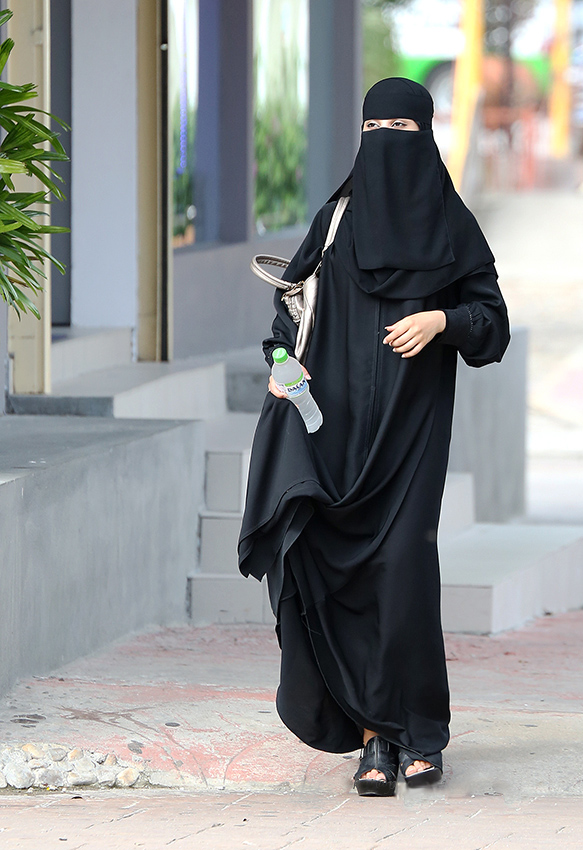
Saudi woman wearing a niqāb in Riyadh. Many women commonly wear a niqab or a burqa in Saudi Arabia.

Saudi Arabia's male guardianship system has been narrowed through a series of legal reforms. Women may obtain their own passports, and those aged 21 and older may travel abroad without a male guardian's prior permission. Women are also no longer legally required to obtain a male guardian's prior consent to work. Saudi labor law prohibits discrimination in the right to work on the basis of sex. Guardianship provisions remain in family law: under the Personal Status Law, a valid marriage requires the woman's consent and an offer by her guardian. A guardian may not marry a woman without her consent, and if he prevents her from marrying a suitable man whom she has accepted, a court may conduct the marriage or transfer the marriage guardianship.

In the courts, the testimony of a woman equals half of a man's and the testimony of one man equals that of two women in family and inheritance law. Men are permitted up to four wives, but women are permitted no more than one husband. Men need no legal justification to unilaterally divorce their wives (talaq), while a woman can only obtain a divorce with the consent of her husband or judicially if her husband has harmed her. With regard to the law of inheritance, the Quran specifies that fixed portions of the deceased's estate must be left to the "Qu'ranic heirs" and so daughters of the deceased will receive half of their brothers.

Saudi women's lives are also shaped by Wahhabi religious policy of strict gender segregation. In health, obesity is a problem among middle and upper class Saudi women, who have domestic servants to do traditional work and have limited ability to leave their house. In 2017, Saudi Arabia's Ministry of Education introduced physical education in girls' public schools, reversing the previous ban on school sports for girls. The program was implemented gradually according to each school's available facilities and qualified female staff. By 2023, the ministry reported that it had equipped more than 200 sports halls at public girls' schools and had begun incorporating physical education into the curriculum for female students.

Women first voted and stood as candidates in municipal elections in 2015. Women have been permitted to drive since 24 June 2018. Since 2019, restaurants in Saudi Arabia have not been required to maintain separate sections or entrances for men and families, although individual establishments may choose to do so. Public-decency regulations prohibit wearing indecent clothing in public and do not specify an abaya or head covering.

=== Youth ===
Like many Muslim countries of the Middle East, Saudi Arabia has a high population growth rate and high percentage of its population under 30 years of age. Estimates of the young population of Saudi Arabia vary:

- Caryle Murphy gives the figure of 51% of the population being under the age of 25, as of February 2012.
- The Economist magazine estimates 60% of the Saudi population under the age of 21, as of March 2012.
- The "United Nations, World Population Prospects: The 2012 Revision" estimates only 28% of the population is under 14 years of age and significant change to Saudi culture is foreseen as this generation becomes older.

Factors such as the decline in per capita income from the failure of oil revenue to keep up with population growth, exposure to youth lifestyles of the outside world, lack of access to quality education and employment opportunity, change in child rearing practices and attitudes towards the ruling royal family—indicate their lives and level of satisfaction will be different than the generation before them.

In recent decades, child rearing in Saudi Arabia has increasingly been handled by hired servants. Since foreign labour is cheap and common, even families of modest means usually have servants. In richer families, each child may have an individual servant.

However, unlike parents, servants can be fired/sacked and are often neither Muslims nor Arabs. Consequently, according to John R. Bradley, they both "lack the authority... to discipline those in their care", and the ability and knowledge to "pass down by example the core Islamic values and traditions that have always formed the bedrock of Saudi society."

Unlike their parents, who grew up during the oil boom of the 1970s and saw their standard of living rise from poverty to affluence, Saudis born "in the 1980s and 1990s have no memory of the impoverished Arabia prior to the oil boom and thus express almost no sense of appreciation."

Instead, they have experienced a kingdom of poor schools, overcrowded universities, and declining job opportunities.. Moreover, their royal rulers' profligate and often non-Islamic lifestyles are increasingly transparent to Saudis and stand in sharp contrast both to Al Saud religious pretensions and to their own declining living standards."

Saudi youth are exposed to youth lifestyles of the outside world via the internet, as dating, and concerts are banned in their country. However, in 2017 concerts were no longer banned in Saudi Arabia. Public fields for soccer are scarce. Even shopping malls do not allow young men unless they are accompanied by a female relative. As of 2014, men are no longer required to have a female relative to be able to enter shopping malls. Insofar as young people have a tendency to "resent authority, reject rules, and seek to exert their independence," youth rebellion is more problematic because the number of "restrictions and conventions against which youth can rebel" in the kingdom is far larger than in most societies. The average age of the king and crown prince is 74, while 50–60% of Saudis are under twenty, creating a significant generation gap between rulers and ruled.

In a 2011 survey, 31% of Saudi youth agreed with the statement `traditional values are outdated and ... I am keen to embrace modern values and beliefs`—the highest percentage in the ten Arab countries surveyed. The number who had confidence about the direction of their country dropped from 98% (in 2010) to 62%. While in most societies these numbers might seem unremarkable, in Saudi Arabia any rebellion stands out against "the unquestioning acceptance ... of previous generations".

Nearly two-thirds of university graduates earn degrees in Islamic subjects, where job prospects are in the public sector, dependent on government revenues. However, funding for public sector may decline not expand in coming years. At least some experts expect the kingdom's expenditures to "exceed its oil revenues as soon as 2014."

Unemployment among 20- to 24-year-olds is 39% – 45% for women and 30.3% for men—compared to an official unemployment rate of 10% circa 2012.

==== Tafheet ====
The sport of Tafheet also called "drifting" or joyriding—illegal street racing-like phenomenon of generally non-modified factory-setup rental cars at very high speeds, around 160–260 km/h (100–160 mph), across wide highways throwing the car left and right that is especially popular in the margins of society—has been noted by observers. A 2004 school survey carried out in the kingdom's three biggest cities found that 45% of teenage boys were involved to some degree in joyriding. The sport has been described as "tyre-burning acrobatics often in stolen or 'borrowed' cars before a flash-mob of youthful admirers." As a dangerous, illegal, and unregulated activity, crashes and fatalities sometimes occur.

=== Foreigners ===
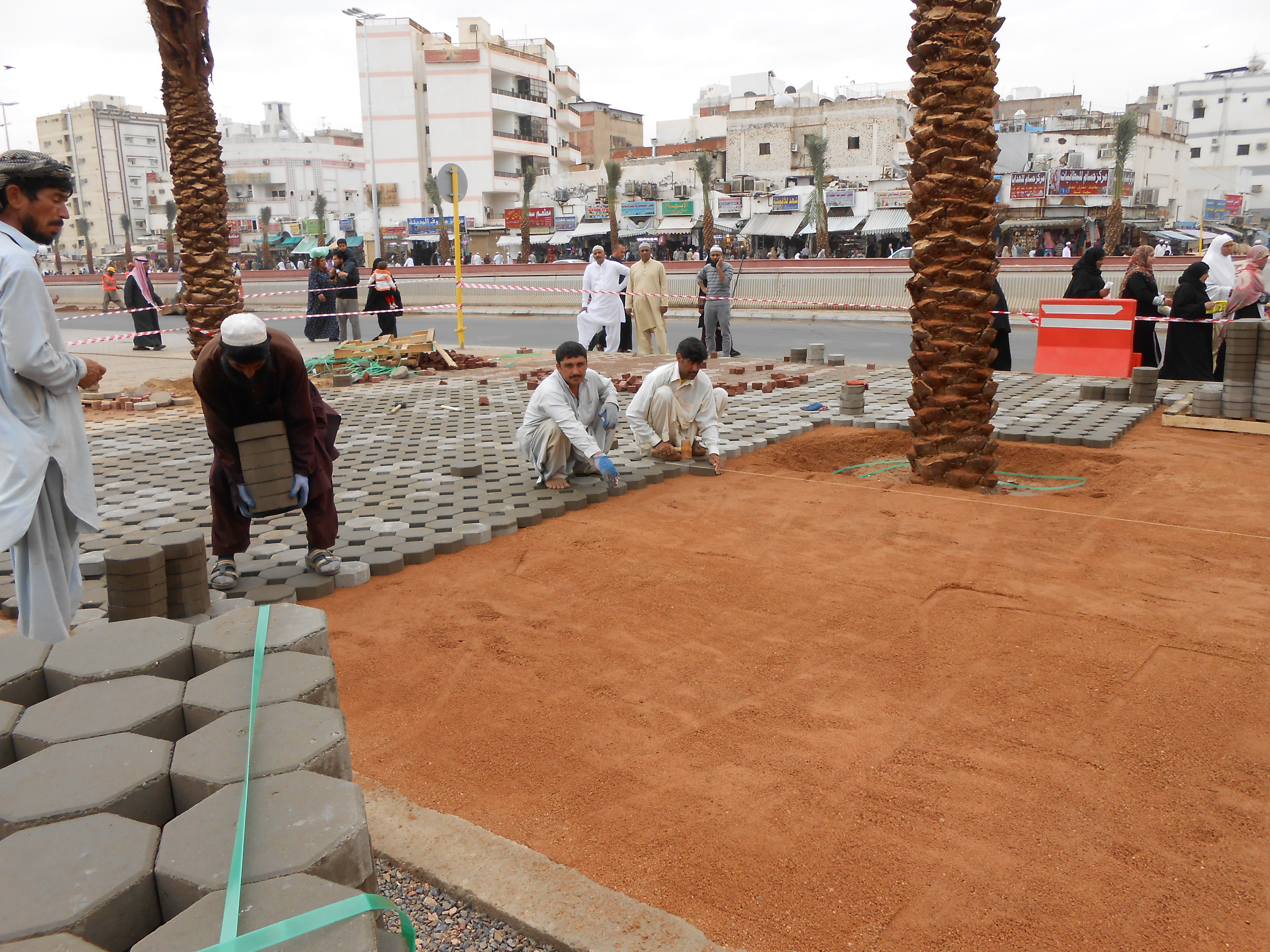
Pakistani workers at Al Masjid Nabawi (the Prophet's Mosque) in Medina

Since the 1960s there has been a significant number of guest workers/foreign expatriates allowed into Saudi on work visas, and these now make up around 20–30% of the population of the country. Guest workers range in occupation from high skilled workers (employed to do jobs Saudis cannot do), to manual service workers (doing jobs Saudis "will not do"). A number of sources describe a "pecking order" among workers established by factors such as the importance of your employer, and country of origin. One source places workers from Gulf oil producing countries at the top, another places Americans there, but all agree that Nationals from places like Bangladesh, Yemen and Philippines are at the bottom. While foreign workers from Western countries are now a small minority, numbering only approximately 100,000, most of whom live in compounds or gated communities.

With a large number of unemployed Saudis, a growing population and need for government spending but stagnating oil revenues with which to pay foreign workers, the large number of expats has come to be seen as "an enormous problem" that "distorts" the Saudi economy and "keeps young people out of the labor market."

In October 2011, the Saudi Labour Ministry put a "ceiling" on the number of guest workers at 20% of the Saudi population, requiring a reduction of foreign population by up to three million over several years. In March 2013, a campaign was initiated to "get rid of its illegal foreign workers, control the legal ones", and lower native-born Saudi unemployment. Approximately one million Bangladeshis, Indians, Filipinos, Nepalis, Pakistanis and Yemenis left between the campaign's beginning and the deadline (November 4, 2013), with authorities planning to expel another one million illegal foreigners in 2014. Ethiopians were a particular target of the campaign, with thousands expelled. Various human rights entities have criticised Saudi Arabia's handling of the issue. Prior to this workers were sometimes not hired or expelled as a way of registering Saudi disapproval of the workers' country. Saudi Arabia expelled 800,000 Yemenis in 1990 and 1991 during the Gulf War due to Yemen's support for Saddam Hussein against Saudi Arabia, and cut the number of Bangladeshis allowed to enter Saudi in 2013 after the Bangladeshi government cracked down on the Islamist Jamaat-e Islami party there.

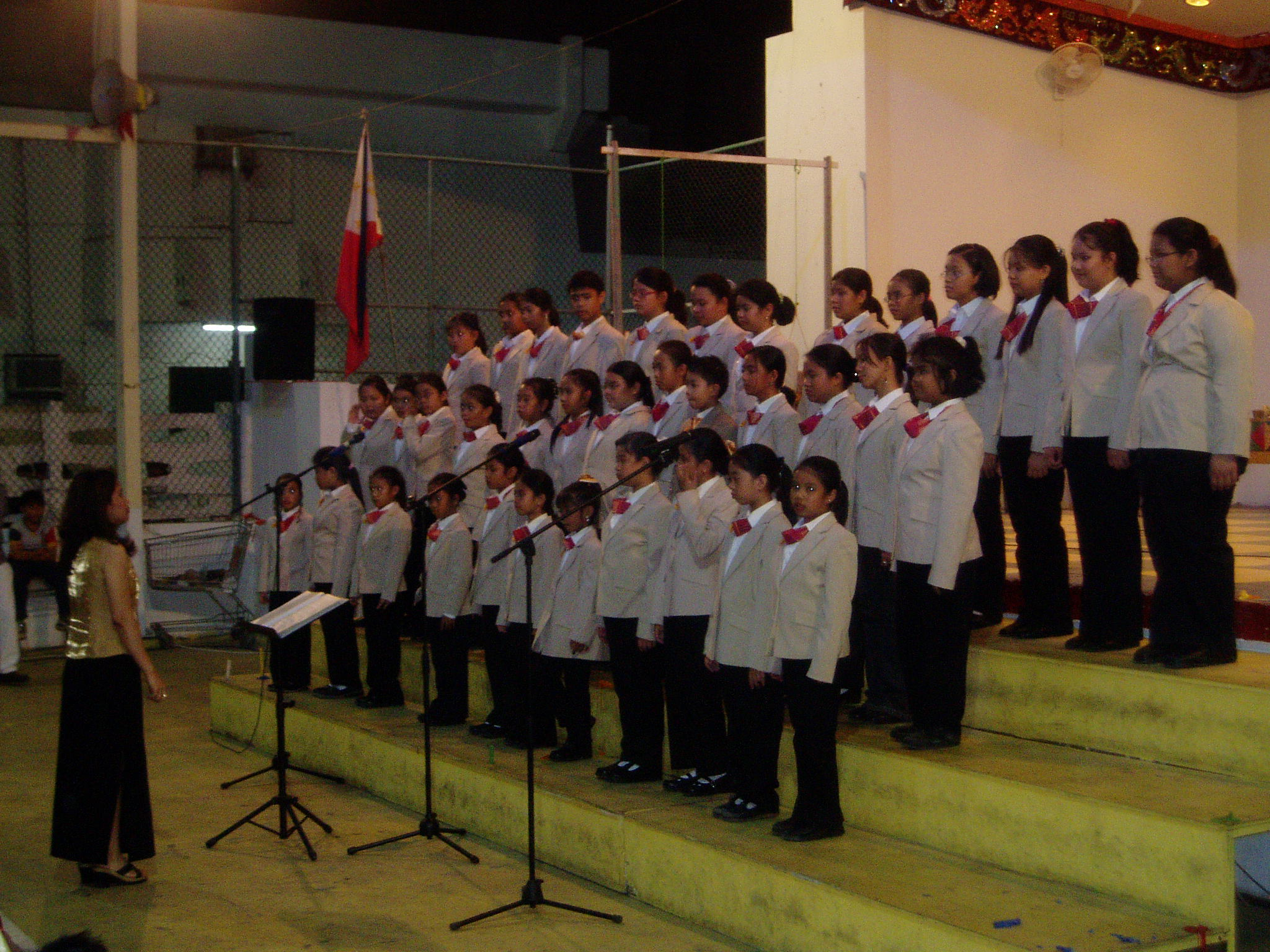
Serenata, a Filipino children's choir in Jeddah

The Saudi–Yemen barrier was constructed by Saudi Arabia against an influx of illegal immigrants and against the smuggling of drugs and weapons. A 2004 law passed by Saudi Arabia's Council of Ministers, entitles Muslim expatriates of all nationalities (except Palestinian) who have resided in the kingdom for ten years to apply for citizenship with priority being given to holders of degrees in various scientific fields. (The estimated 240,000 Palestinians living in Saudi Arabia are excluded, because of Arab League agreement instructions barring the Arab states from granting them citizenship of another Arab state.)

Treatment of foreign workers is also an issue. According to Human Rights Watch, as of 2014, there was a "worrying trend" of expatriate domestic workers filing "complaints of exploitation and abuse" only to face counter-allegations by their employers of "theft, witchcraft or adultery." 41 expat workers from just one country, Indonesia, faced "possible death sentences" in Saudi Arabia on charges "ranging from black magic to stealing, adultery and murder".

In 2014 Saudi men were banned from marrying women from Bangladesh, Pakistan, Myanmar and Chad.

=== Legacy of slavery ===
The history of slavery in the Arabian Peninsula goes back thousands of years. A large slave trade was provided va the Red Sea slave trade across the Red Sea from Africa from Ancient times until the 20th century.

In 1962, Saudi Arabia abolished slavery officially; however, unofficial slavery is rumored to exist. Chattel slavery was phased out and transformed in to the kafala system.

== Food and drink ==
Today, Saudis follow many of their traditional habits, especially in food and drinks. As many Saudis are originally descended from tribes of sheep and goat herders, many Saudi dishes are mainly made of sheep meat.

Saudi Arabian cuisine is similar to that of the surrounding countries in the Arabian Peninsula and has been heavily influenced by Turkish, Persian, and African food. Animals are slaughtered in accordance with halal Islamic dietary laws, which consider pork forbidden (haram) and alcohol forbidden (haram). As a general rule, Saudis (like other Muslims) consider impure pork to be disgusting, but forbidden alcohol a temptation. Consequently, dietary laws regarding the former are more strictly observed than those regarding the latter.

=== Religious limitations ===
People of Saudi Arabia are restricted by the religious norms related to food and drink. Thus, alcohol is prohibited in Islam and, accordingly, it is prevented in the country. Furthermore, pork is also prohibited and Saudis do not eat it. Nevertheless, cows, sheep, chicken and other types of animals can't be eaten unless they are slaughtered according to the Islamic law.

=== Cuisine ===
A dish consisting of a stuffed lamb, known as khūzī, is the traditional national dish. Kebabs are popular, as is shāwarmā, a marinated grilled meat dish of lamb, mutton, or chicken, sometimes wrapped in flat bread. As in other Arab countries of the Arabian Peninsula, machbūs (kabsa), a rice dish with fish or shrimp, is popular. Flat, unleavened bread is a staple of virtually every meal, as are dates and fresh fruit. Coffee, served in the Arabic style, is the traditional beverage.

The appearance of modern supermarkets and commercial restaurants starting in the 1970s has changed Saudi culinary habits. International cuisine, particularly fast food, has become popular in all Saudi urban areas (i.e. in 80% of the country). While traditionally Saudis ate sitting on the floor using the right hand or flat bread to take food from a roasted lamb, goat or camel carcass, the practice of eating while sitting on a chair at a table has become more standard practice, if not the use of knives and forks.

Table manners

Coffee is often served "with great ceremony", and it is customary for a person to drink two or three cups to indicate their approval of the coffee. Cups are refilled unless a gesture—shaking the cup—is made to indicate the coffee-drinker has had enough. It is considered good manners for a guest to eat heartily.

=== Food sources ===
Saudi Arabia is a deserted country where many oases can be found. Accordingly, over 18 million date palms are planted in the country and 600 million pounds of dates are produced every year. Thus, dates are considered one of the main and permanent fruits in Saudi Arabia, particularly in Ramadan when dates are eaten in sunset by fasters to break their fast. Additionally, dates are eaten as a snack and many Saudi desserts are made of dates. Besides dates, numerous kinds of foodstuffs are planted in Saudi Arabia, including wheat, rice, beans, watermelon and others. Animals, such as goats, sheep, cows and camels are also nurtured in the country.

== News media ==
Educated Saudis are well-informed of issues of the Arab world, the Islamic world, and the world at large, but freedom of the press and public expression of opinion are not recognized by the government. The Basic Law of Saudi Arabia states that the media's role is to educate and inspire national unity, and are prohibited from acts that lead "to disorder and division". News stories, public speeches and other acts of personal expression cannot conflict with traditional Islamic values, or dissent from government policy, insult government officials, especially the royal family, and cannot delve too deeply into certain sensitive and taboo subject matters that might embarrass the government or spread dissent, i.e. the role of women in Saudi society, the treatment of Shiite Muslims, damage caused by natural disasters, or social problems such as the AIDS-HIV pandemic and human trafficking.

Most Saudi Arabian newspapers are privately owned but subsidized and regulated by the government. As of 2013, BBC News reported that criticism of the government and royal family and the questioning of Islamic tenets "are not generally tolerated. Self-censorship is pervasive." As of 2014, Freedom House rates the kingdom's press and internet "Not Free".

== Civil society ==
Labor unions and political parties are prohibited in the kingdom, although a few underground political parties do exist. The government has created a national "Consultative Council" (which is appointed not elected, and does not pass laws), and has given permission for certain "societies" to exist (though they have little ability to influence government policy). Informal public discussion of public policy is not actively encouraged, although it is not expressly illegal per se, unless it is deemed to be promoting immorality, dissent or disloyalty. Limited non-partisan municipal elections were held in 2005.

== Sport ==
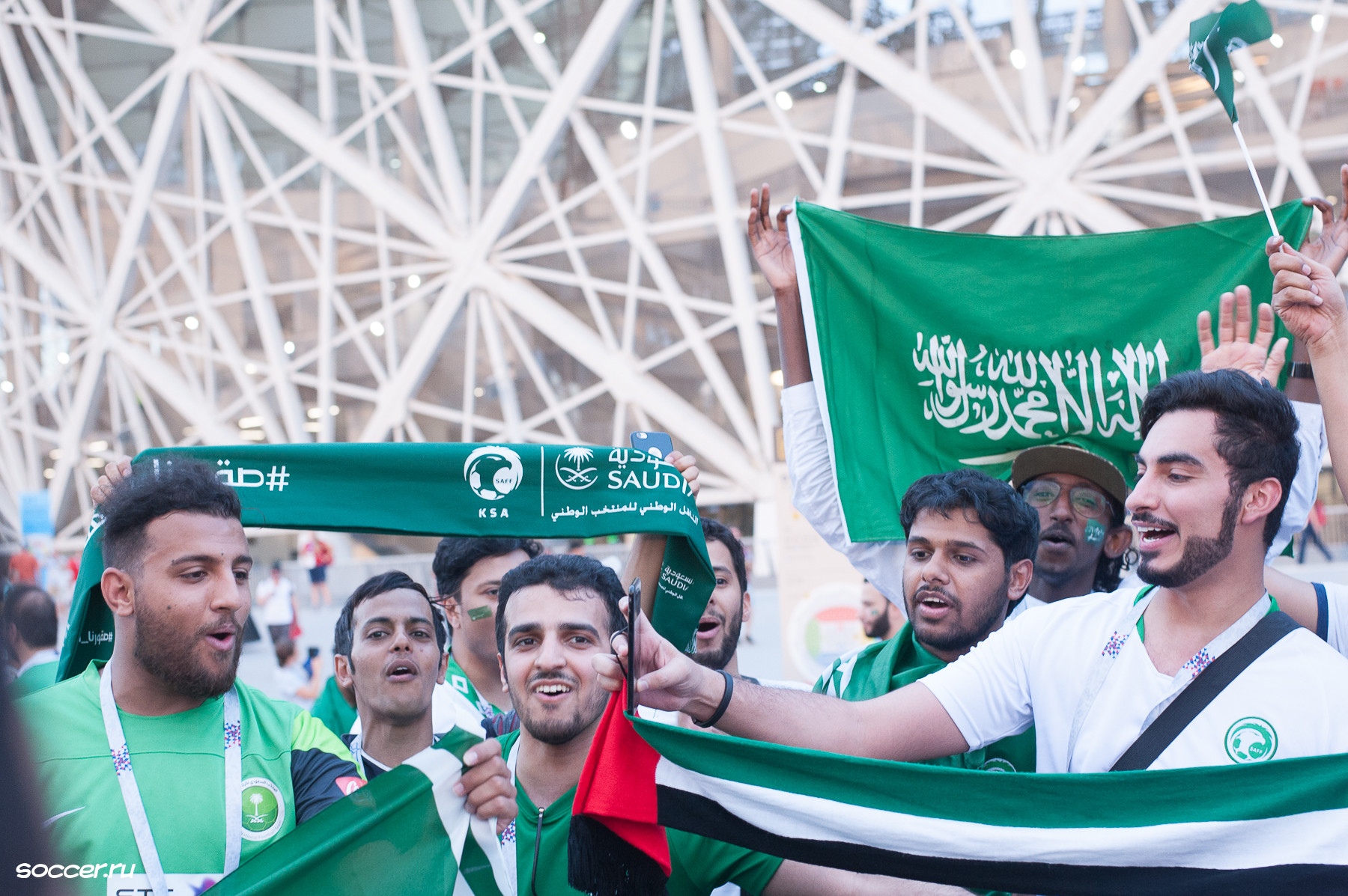
Saudi football fans cheering for their national football team at the FIFA World Cup

The most popular sport in Saudi Arabia is Association football (soccer) in both in participation and viewing. It is governed by the Saudi Arabia Football Federation that was founded in 1956.

There are 60 football clubs participating in three main professional football league levels; the Saudi Professional League involving 16 football clubs, Saudi First Division League with 20 clubs and Second Division with 24 clubs. The demotics competitions also include some cups such as King club, Crown Prince Cup and Saudi Super Cup.

The Saudi Arabia national football team has qualified five times for FIFA World Cup competitions, in 1994, 1998, 2002, 2006, and most recently, in 2018. Moreover, it qualified for the AFC Asian Cup 10 times and had won three of them.

Recently, some Saudi players have become skilled enough to play in Europe. The players were sent to Spain to play in the La Liga aiming to improve their skills better.

Basketball is also popular. The Saudi Arabia national team won the bronze medal at the 1999 Asian Championship.

Horse racing is also another diversion in Saudi Arabia which has a historical and cultural legacy where Friday afternoon is the traditional time of horse racing in Riyadh, the Saudi capital. The establishment of the Equestrian Club of Riyadh in 1965 was a result of the importance of horse racing. Moreover, now Saudis are the dominant player in some international horse racing such as Royal Ascot to Longchamp and Melbourne.

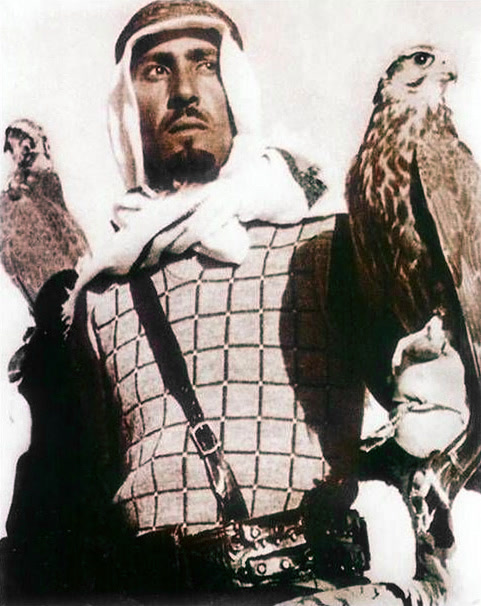
King Abdullah practicing falconry, a traditional pursuit in Saudi Arabia

Falconry is another sport with long traditions rooted in Bedouin culture. It mainly consists of raising falcons, training them and using them for hunting. Despite the inscription of Falconry by the UNESCO as a living human heritage, it is also emerging as a sport.

Camel racing is a sport practiced in the kingdom. There are camel racetracks in most of the kingdom's major centres, and races for prize money on many weekends throughout the winter months. camels are sometimes bred for desirable traits to be sold in the same way horses are.

=== Women's sport ===
In 2012, Saudi Arabia included women in its Olympic team for the first time. Two female athletes—a runner and judoka—participated. The inclusion followed international criticism for years of exclusion, but was controversial in the kingdom, and "prompted some to abuse the morals" of the athletes on social media.

As of April 2014, Saudi authorities in the education ministry have been asked by the Shoura Council to consider lifting a state school ban on sports for girls with the proviso that any sports conform to Sharia rules on dress and gender segregation, according to the official SPA news agency.

Women participation have then increased as four athletes were sent to the 2016 Summer Olympics in Rio. They were two runner Sarah Attar, and Cariman Abu al-Jadail joined by judo athlete Wujud Fahmi and fencing competitor Lubna al-Omair.

In 2018, more than 1300 girls participated in a 3 km marathon, al-Ahsa Runs, for the first time in the country.

== Arts and entertainment ==
Visual arts tend to be dominated by geometric, floral, and abstract designs and by calligraphy. Sunni Islam traditionally prohibits creating representations of people. With the advent of oil wealth in the 20th century came exposure to outside influences, such as Western housing styles, furnishings, and clothes.

Calligraphy is the art of forming arranging beautiful letters and symbols, and it is among the dominant art forms in Saudi Arabia. This art has been emerging in different themes such as metalwork, ceramics, glass textiles, painting, and sculpture.

Apart from the dominant art forms, there were some portrait paintings and sculptures produced by some artists in the 1960s like Artist Dia Aziz Dia from Jeddah.

Al-Qatt Al-Asiri is another essential art form represents the identity of the Asir region. It is the art of interior wall decoration usually carried out by women. The base of this art is white gypsum with colorful patterns of geometric shapes and symbol painted on it. This art form is now inscribed on UNESCO's Intangible Cultural Heritage of Humanity.

The ten-day-long Jenadriyah National Festival celebrates the founding of the kingdom and showcases Saudi culture and heritage, traditional crafts such as pottery and woodcutting, folk dance and traditional songs.

=== Music and dance ===
Music and dance have always been part of Saudi life. Bedouin poetry, known as nabaṭī, is still very popular. Traditional music is generally associated with poetry and is sung collectively. Instruments include the rabābah, an instrument not unlike a three-string fiddle, and various types of percussion instruments, such as the ṭabl (drum) and the ṭār (tambourine). Al-sihba folk music has its origins in al-Andalus. In Mecca, Medina and Jeddah, dance and song incorporate the sound of the mizmar, an oboe-like woodwind instrument, in the performance of the mizmar dance. The drum is also an important instrument according to traditional and tribal customs. Samri is a popular traditional form of music and dance in which poetry is sung. Of the native dances, the most popular is a martial line dance known as the Ardha, which includes lines of men, frequently armed with swords or rifles, dancing to the beat of drums and tambourines. As one non-Saudi described it, the performance consists of: "barefooted males clad in their normal street clothes of thobe and gutra jumping up and down mostly in one spot while wielding swords".

Dahha is another popular dance in Northern Saudi performed by one line of men or two lines facing each other while a man in between sings a poem which can be a satirical, eulogy or a descriptive poem.

=== Literature ===
Bedouin poetry is a cultural tradition in Saudi Arabia. According to Sandra Mackey, author of The Saudis: Inside the Desert Kingdom, "the role that formal poetry, prose, and oratory play in Saudi culture is totally alien to Western culture." Mackey explained that the Bedouin poet was the origin of Saudi society's traditionally strong attachment to the concept of language. She said that poetry "can arise in the most curious of situations" due to the role of poetry in Saudi culture.

The literary renaissance began during the first quarter of the 20th century where the literary genre of poetry was improved in language and number of poets. The pioneer poets during that era include Mohammed Faqi (1914-2004), Tahir Zamakhshri (1914-1987), and Hasan Alqurashi (1926-2004).

Novel writing is another literary genre in Saudi literature where the first Saudi novel was The Twins (1930) by Abdul Alquddus Alansari. In the modern era of Saudi novel, some novel writer becomes popular like Turki Alhamad, Abdu Khal Raja Alim.

Theatre in Saudi Arabia back to 1928 where their origins were schools. The earliest attempts were in Qassim and Makkah, and subsequently, universities contributed to the theatre activities.

Contemporary Saudi novelists and artists include:

- Abdul Rahman Munif (many of his books were banned and his citizenship revoked)
- Turki al-Hamad
- Raja'a Alem
- Rajaa Al Sanie, author of best-selling novel Girls of Riyadh
- Ghazi Abdul Rahman Al Gosaibi
- Haifaa al-Mansour

=== Entertainment ===
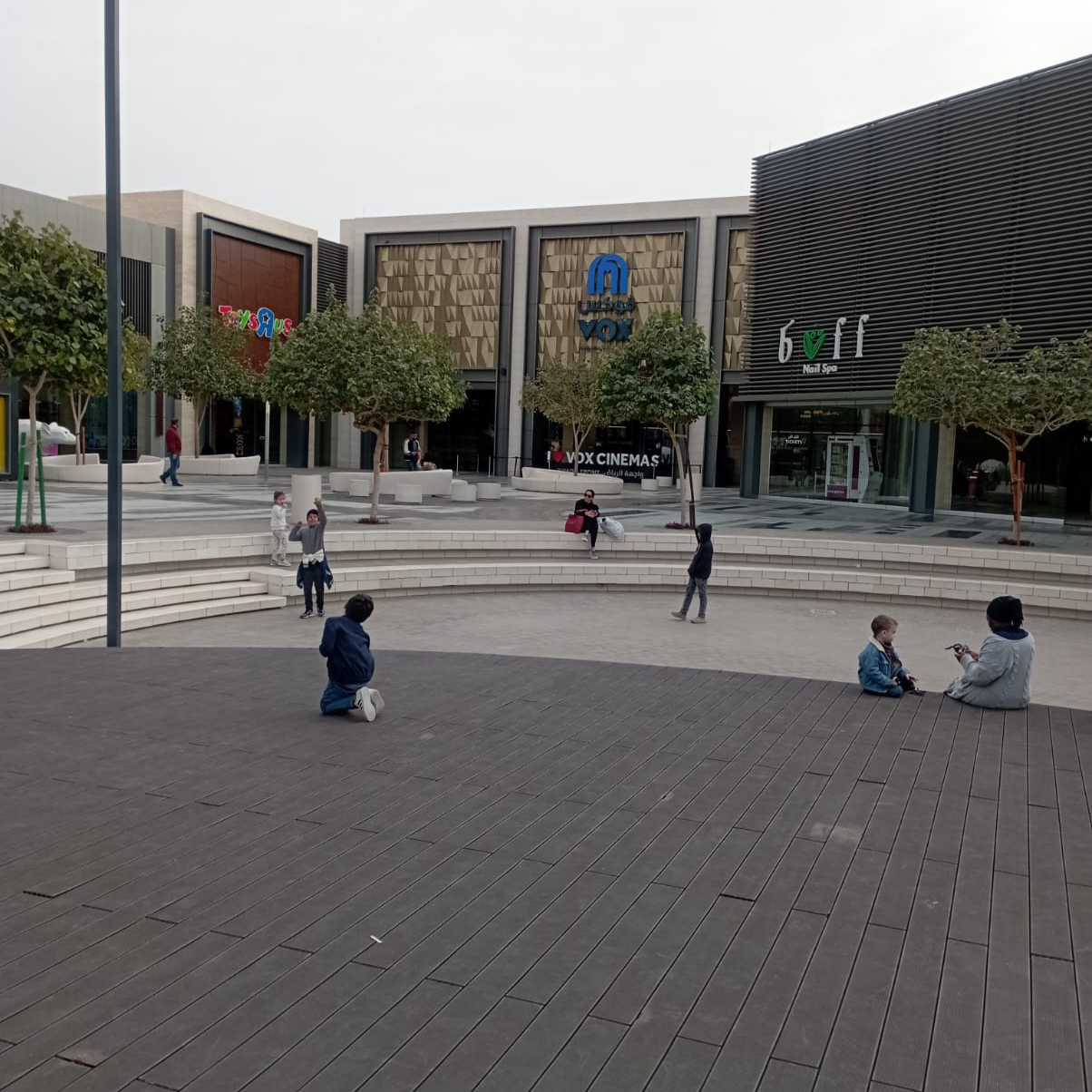
VOX Cinemas movie theater (center) at Riyadh Front in 2023

During the 1970s, cinemas were numerous in the kingdom although they were seen as contrary to tribal norms. All cinemas and theaters were closed in 1980 as a political response to the Islamic revival and the increase in Islamist activism, most particularly the 1979 seizure of the Grand Mosque in Mecca. As of 2018, cinemas opened in multiple cities including Riyadh and Jeddah.

Saudi Arabia aims to increase the number of cinema screens from 430 screens in 2021 to 2,600 screens by 2030.

The establishment of the General Authority for Entertainment in 2016 has pushed for entertainment options of the including cinemas, public concerts, international conferences, competitions, singing shows and other cultural activities.

== See also ==
- Arab culture
- Architecture of Saudi Arabia
- Asian culture
- Middle Eastern culture
- West Asian culture
