= Totoy Bato =

Totoy Bato may refer to:

- Totoy Bato (character), character by Filipino comic book creator Carlo J. Caparas
- Totoy Bato, 1977 film adaptation starring Fernando Poe Jr.
- Totoy Bato (2009 TV series)
- Totoy Bato (2025 TV series)
- Totoy Bato (singer)
