= PSJ =

PSJ may refer to:

- Port St. John, Florida, USA; a CDP
- Persija Jakarta, an Indonesian football club
- Kasiguncu Airport (IATA airport code: PSJ, ICAO airport code: WAMP), Poso, Indonesia
- Photographic Society of Japan
- Philippine School in Jeddah, now International Philippine School in Jeddah
- Polskie Stowarzyszenia Jazzowe
