= Saudi national dress =

Thawb and abaya

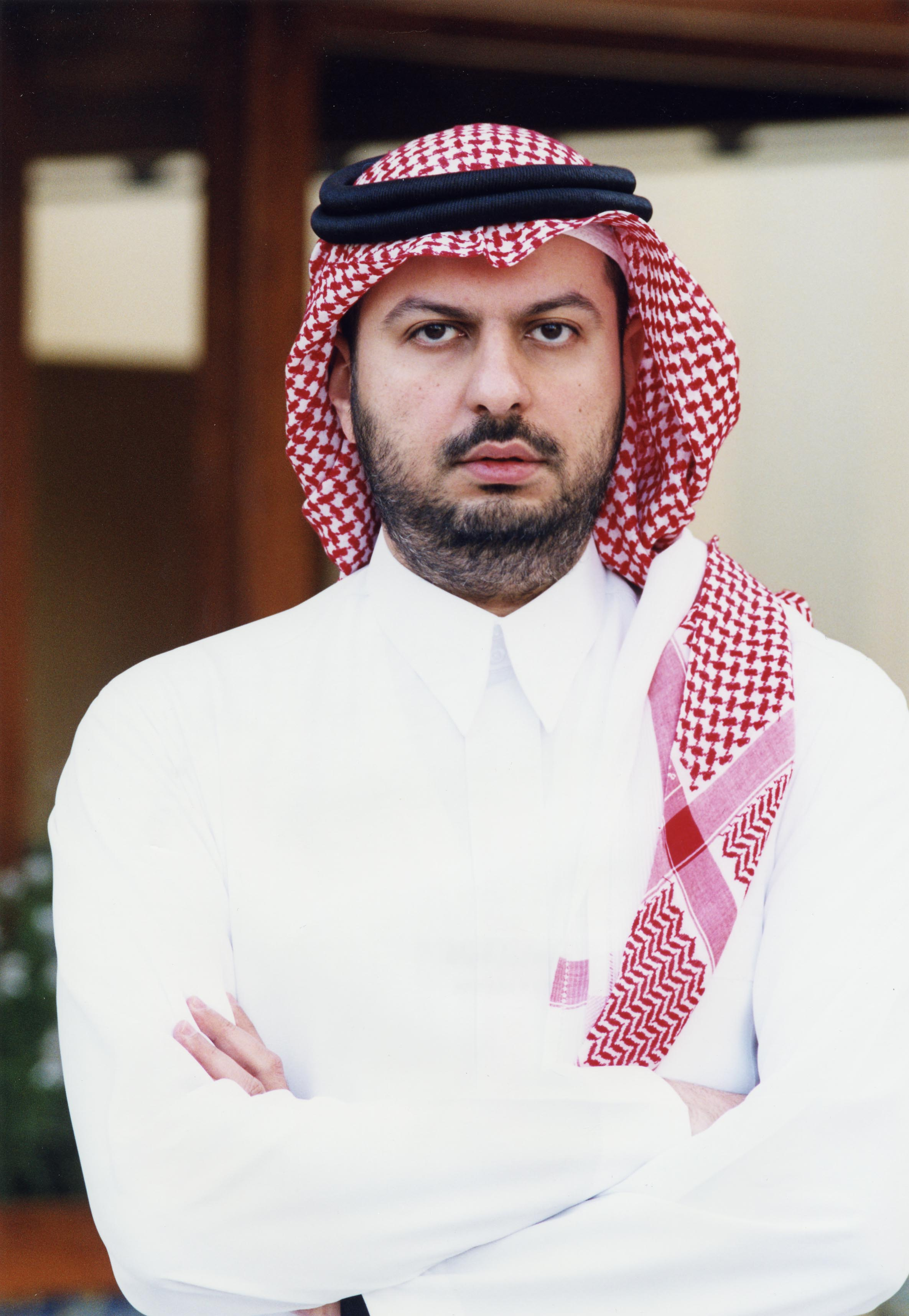
Prince Abdullah Bin Mosaad Al Saud, wearing a thawb

The official national dress in Saudi Arabia is the thawb for men, and the abaya for women. The dress code in Saudi Arabia recommends citizens to wear the official Saudi national dress when visiting government offices and agencies.

== Saudi male dress ==
The thawb is considered a daily essential dress for Saudi male citizens. It is a loose-fitting, long robe consisting of 22 embroidered pieces that cover most of the body, with long sleeves that end at the wrists. The sleeve endings can be either open or closed with buttons, and this style is called Kabak (cufflinks). The Saudi thawb has two common types of collars that cover part of the neck. One is a traditional rounded collar, and the other is a flip collar, popularly known as qallabi. The thawb has two symmetrical side pockets and a visible upper pocket on the left side of the chest. The style of wearing the thawb varies depending on its type, and it can be worn with a sudairiya (vest), the bisht, or ghutrah.

The traditional Saudi thawb, usually white, may be worn in dark colors by some individuals during winter, but it is uncommon for Saudis to wear a colored thawb in the summer. The Saudi thawb does not come in vibrant colors. It is made from various types of fabrics, including silk or polyester, as well as synthetic and pure cotton.

=== The Central Region ===
- Men wear Usabah, Ghutrah, Thawb, Daqlah, Bisht Al-Barga, or Eqal Zari, Zabon, and Bisht.
- Boys wear Zari Taqiyah, Eqal, Ghutrah, Thawb Murowdin, and Jukha.

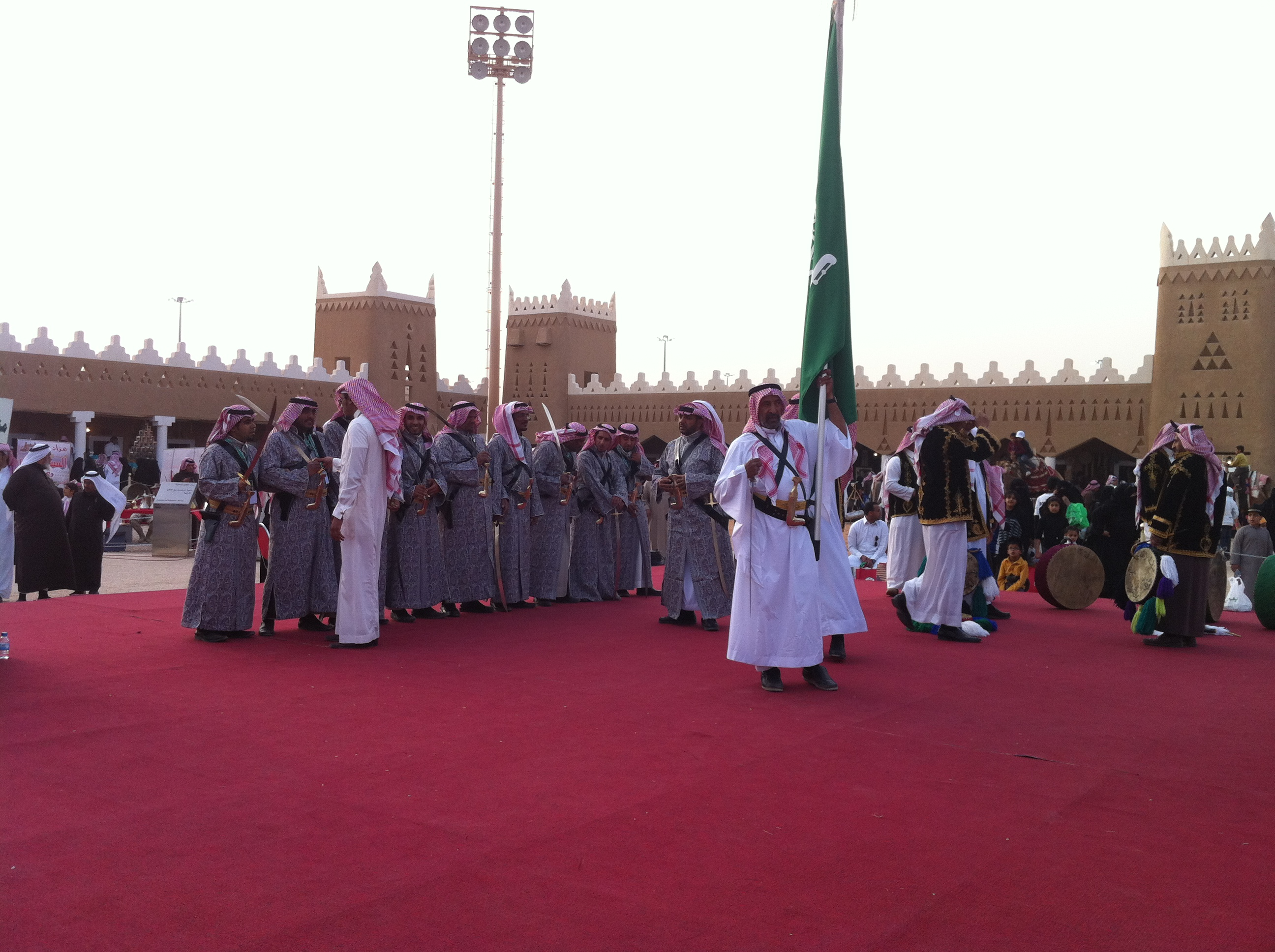
Ardah at Jenadriyah

==== Thawb Murowdin ====
The Thawb Murowdin has gained popularity in the central region. It resembles the traditional Saudi thawb, but it has longer sleeves and stands out as an essential piece of clothing worn during the Saudi Ardah performance. It is distinguished by its loose-fitting design and wide sleeves that reach the ground when the hands are relaxed.

=== The Northern Region ===
- Men wear Eqal, Ghutrah, Thawb Murowdin, and Bisht.
- Boys wear Eqal, Ghutrah, Thawb Murowdin, and Bisht.

=== The Southern Region ===
- Men wear Usabah, Beidy, and Thawb.
- Boys wear Qamees, Musanaf and Ezar.

=== Asir Region and al-Baha ===
==== Al-Muthail or Al-Mahroud ====
In the deserts of Asir and Al-Baha, people used to wear a long-sleeved and wide thawb known as Al-Muthail. The distinctive feature of the Al-Muthail thawb is its shorter length, reaching the mid-leg. Its long sleeves gather towards the back and are tied to assist with agricultural and daily tasks. In Sarawat mountains areas with a rural nature, the thawb is not tail-coated or as wide and loose as traditional Bedouin garments. It is usually worn with a cloak or Shamla in black, white, or dark red colors, made of leather or wool.

==== Al-Ezar (Al-Musanaf) ====
In the Tehama region of Asir, men commonly wear a lower body garment called Ezar (also known as Al-Musanaf, Al-Hawka, Al-Mathloth, or Al-Jarafi). These are different names for the same type of garment, distinguished by the fabric type and method of manufacturing. The upper body is covered with a vest known as Kurta in some areas and Sudairiya or Samij in others. These vests are typically made from black or striped fabrics.

==== Al-Mathoulaq ====
In the eastern parts of the Asir region, men wear two types of garments: the first type is called Al-Mathoulq, which is a thawb sewn in a way that makes it loose in relation to the body. Its sleeves are very wide, cut from the top, and long from the bottom. The second type is called Al-Haili, which is a loose-fitting robe with full sleeves that are not wide.

==== Al-Mabram ====
In the eastern parts of the Asir region, men wear a special thawb for farming known as Al-Mabram. It is characterized by its durability, strength, and shorter length. Its sleeves are also short to facilitate movement and cultivation.

== Saudi female dress ==
There is no specific and common dress for Saudi women. However, when outside the home, they typically wear the black abaya, which is the most common color. Some women also choose to wear colored abayas. Additionally, they wear a head covering called the Tarhah (Shaila), and some also opt to wear a face-covering veil called the Niqaab.

Traditional female dress in the Kingdom of Saudi Arabia varies by region. It includes clothing for daily use, dresses for special occasions, and outfits for going out. Examples of such clothing are different types of dresses, the Darra’ah. Additionally, there are coverings for the head, along with various accessories such as jewelry and adornments.

=== The Central Region ===
- Women wear Shaila, Thawb, or Thawb Al-Tor with a Darra’ah worn underneath, adorned with Zari embroidery and colorful sequin trims on the sleeves.
- Girls wear Quba’ and either a Muqta’ or Darra’ah.

=== The Eastern Region ===
- Women wear Thawb Al-Nashl with a Darra’ah underneath.
- Girls wear Bukhnag with a Darra’ah underneath.

=== The Western Region ===
- Women wear Muharama, Thawb, and Zabun. Alternatively, they may wear Masfa’ and Berm, along with Thawb Al-Sadra.
- Girls wear Shaila and Thawb Mebagar.

==== Al-Zabun ====
It is the main outerwear garment in the Western region. It is made from satin or Indian brocade fabric, depending on preferences and tastes. It is characterized by a high collar and short sleeves that reach the elbow.

=== The Southern Region ===
- Women wear Thawb Mujannab and Al-Shaila Al-Muraisha.
- Girls wear Thawb Mukallaf and Tafsha.

==== Al-Mujannab (Al-Matrook) ====
It is a distinctive garment worn by women in the Asir region. It is name is due to the presence of a slit above the thigh, from which several side panels descend to help widen the garment. The Matrook is made from various fabrics, including satin, black cotton, or Qatifa (velvet) fabric. It is embroidered using multi-colored silk threads, commonly found on the sleeves, chest, and along the length of the side panels.
