= IPSJ =

IPSJ may refer to:

- Information Processing Society of Japan, a Japanese learned society for computing
- International Philippine School in Jeddah, a Philippine international school in Jeddah, Saudi Arabia
