= Totoy Bato (singer) =

Filipino singer (1944–2021)

- Born: Rodolfo Razon Laxamana; 1944 Angeles City, Pampanga, Philippines
- Died: 2021 (aged 76–77) Porac, Pampanga
- Occupation: Folk singer
- Language: Kapampangan
- Genre: Polosa
- Years active: 1972–2017

Rodolfo Razon Laxamana (1944–2021), known professionally as Totoy Bato, was a Filipino musical artist. Laxamana was born in Angeles City, Pampanga, and sang in the Kapampangan language. He started his career in the 1970s, lifting his stage name from a Fernando Poe Jr. picture, and recorded dozens of CDs across four decades. His songs have proved enduringly popular with Kapampangan people, including overseas workers who play him to remind themselves of home. They are considered the quintessential examples of polosa or basulto, which are kinds of Kapampangan folk songs. Laxamana stopped singing after surviving a stroke in 2017. He died in 2021.

== Life ==
Rodolfo Razon Laxamana was born in Angeles City, Pampanga, in 1944. (Note: Laxamana was 69 in May 2013, and 73 in August 2017, placing his birthdate in 1944.) Poverty ended his schooling by the sixth grade, and he worked as a gasoline boy and drove jeepneys and trucks to make ends meet.

Listening to artists and poets such as Jose Gallardo over the radio, Laxamana learnt how to write his own rhymes. He was drawn to the polosa, a folk music tradition characterized by extemporaneous singing before an audience, by hearing Maria Sarat of Bacolor. Laxamana began his musical career in the 1970s. His first release, "40 Days" (1972), was about the severe floods which hit Luzon that year, and became his most requested song. Laxamana later took the name Totoy Bato after watching Fernando Poe Jr.'s character in Durugin si Totoy Bato (1979).

Laxamana became a popular polosador in Pampanga. During his post-EDSA heyday, Laxamana recalled getting around 10 clients for campaign jingles every election season. In 1986, Laxamana turned down a contract with Wea Recording. He later regretted the decision and mused on whether he would have received royalties for his work. His polosas were widely distributed and pirated, and were even heard on Betamax recordings by Filipinos in Saudi Arabia. He failed to secure copyright to his songs.

By 2013, Laxamana had recorded and self-produced 30–40 albums. With the rise of modern technology, he attracted fewer politicians and commanded prices of ₱8,000 or higher. He retained a large following in rural areas. In 2017, a stroke put an end to Laxamana's career.

Laxamana died in 2021.
