= Muhammed Hasan Faqi =

Saudi poet and writer

- Born: 1912; Makkah, Saudi Arabia
- Died: 2004 (aged 91–92)
- Occupations: Teacher, Ambassador Saudi Arabia to Indonesia
- Known for: Poet, Writer

Muhammed Hasan Faqi (Arabic: محمد حسن فقي; 1912–2004) was a Saudi poet and writer born in Makkah. He was educated in Makkah and Jeddah, worked as a teacher in Alfalah school and then as editor-in-chief of the Saut Al-Hijaz newspaper. Faqi occupied various prominent positions in the Saudi government as he was appointed as an ambassador of Saudi Arabia to Indonesia.

== Career and public service ==
Faqi began his career as a teacher before becoming editor-in-chief of Sawt al-Hijaz. He later held several government and cultural positions, including at the Ministry of Finance, as Saudi ambassador to Indonesia, and as founder of the General Bureau for Auditing under King Faisal.

== Poetry ==
Faqi published several collections of poetry and short stories. Moreover, he published several books on various topics including literature, religion, and legal issues. His best poetry was published in Rubaiyyat (QUARTETS), a collection 474 quatrains.

QUARTETS 1.

I traveled life in search of tranquility

But the journey amplified my sorrow and qualms.

From so much suffering I feel as if

I’ve inhabited this space for centuries

What is it I want? I do not know my pursuit

Is it glory that I seek? Is it pleasure?

Yet hardship has its contentment

I have grown,

for all of life’s jolts

More tender still.
