= Filipinos in Saudi Arabia =

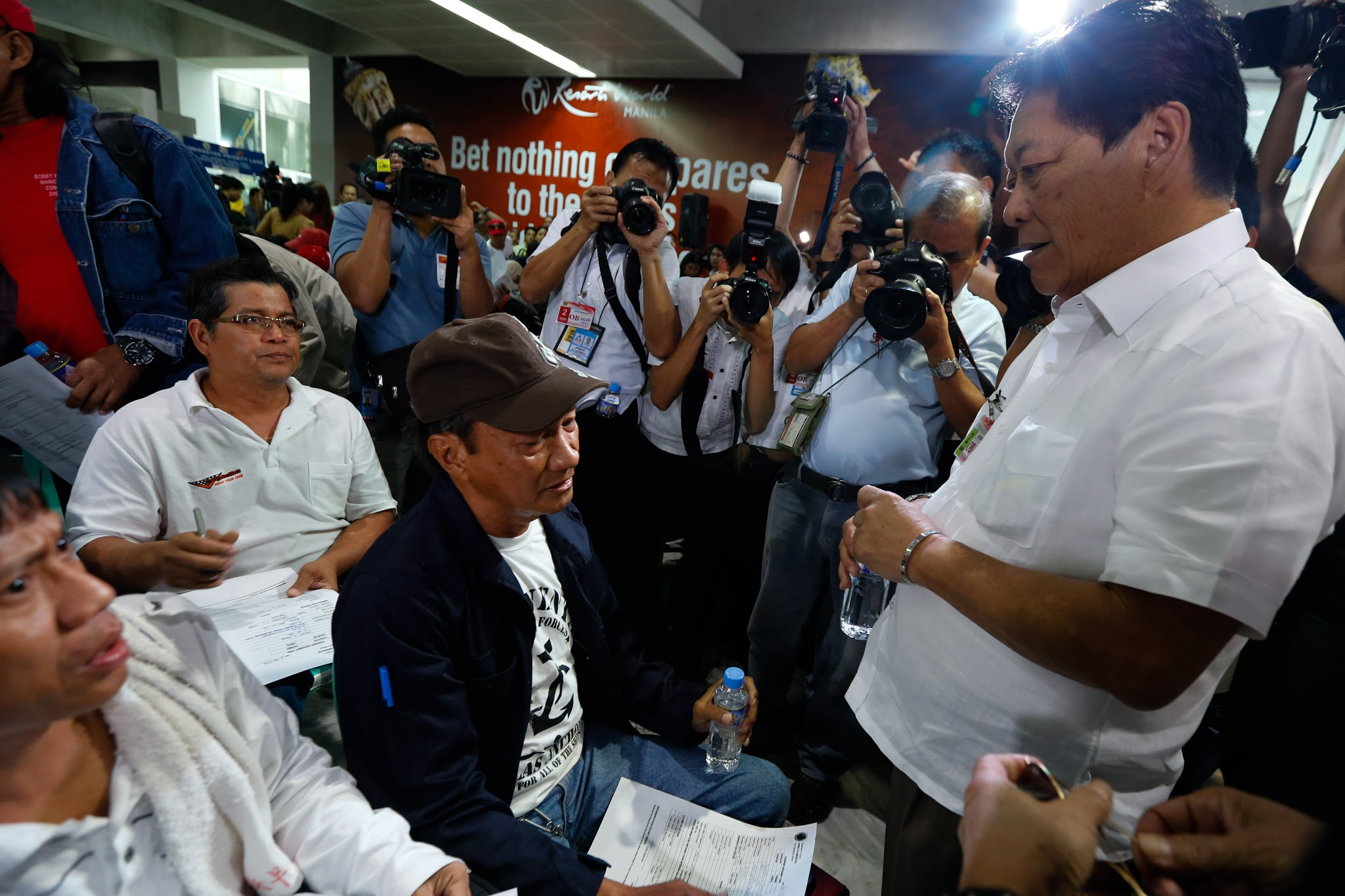
- Philippines Labor Secretary Silvestre Bello III (right) speaking to a group of Filipino workers stationed in Saudi Arabia in 2016

Total population
- 725,893 (2022 census)

Languages
- Filipino, English, Arabic

Religion
- Islam, Roman Catholicism and other Christian denominations

Related ethnic groups
- Filipino people, Overseas Filipinos

Filipinos in Saudi Arabia are migrants or descendants of the Philippines who live in Saudi Arabia. Saudi Arabia is currently the largest employer of Overseas Filipino Workers (OFWs), and has the largest Filipino population in the Middle East. Filipinos make up the fourth-largest group of foreigners in Saudi Arabia, and are the second-largest source of remittances to the Philippines.

== Migration history ==
Filipinos first arrived in Saudi Arabia in 1973, when a group of Filipino engineers migrated to the country. As of 2009, staff at the Saudi Arabian embassy in the Philippines process between 800 and 900 jobs for Filipinos daily. In 2008, Saudi Arabia had 300,000 job orders for Filipinos. Later, in the first time hiring Filipino medical professionals, Saudi Arabia announced intentions to hire 6,000 Filipinos as doctors and nurses between 2009 and 2011. In addition to medical professionals, Filipinos work as automotive workers, construction workers, and engineers, as well as in the fields of desalination, petroleum production and processing, telecommunications, and transportation. In 2023, there were an estimated 130,000 Filipino nurses working in Saudi Arabia.

== Labor issues ==
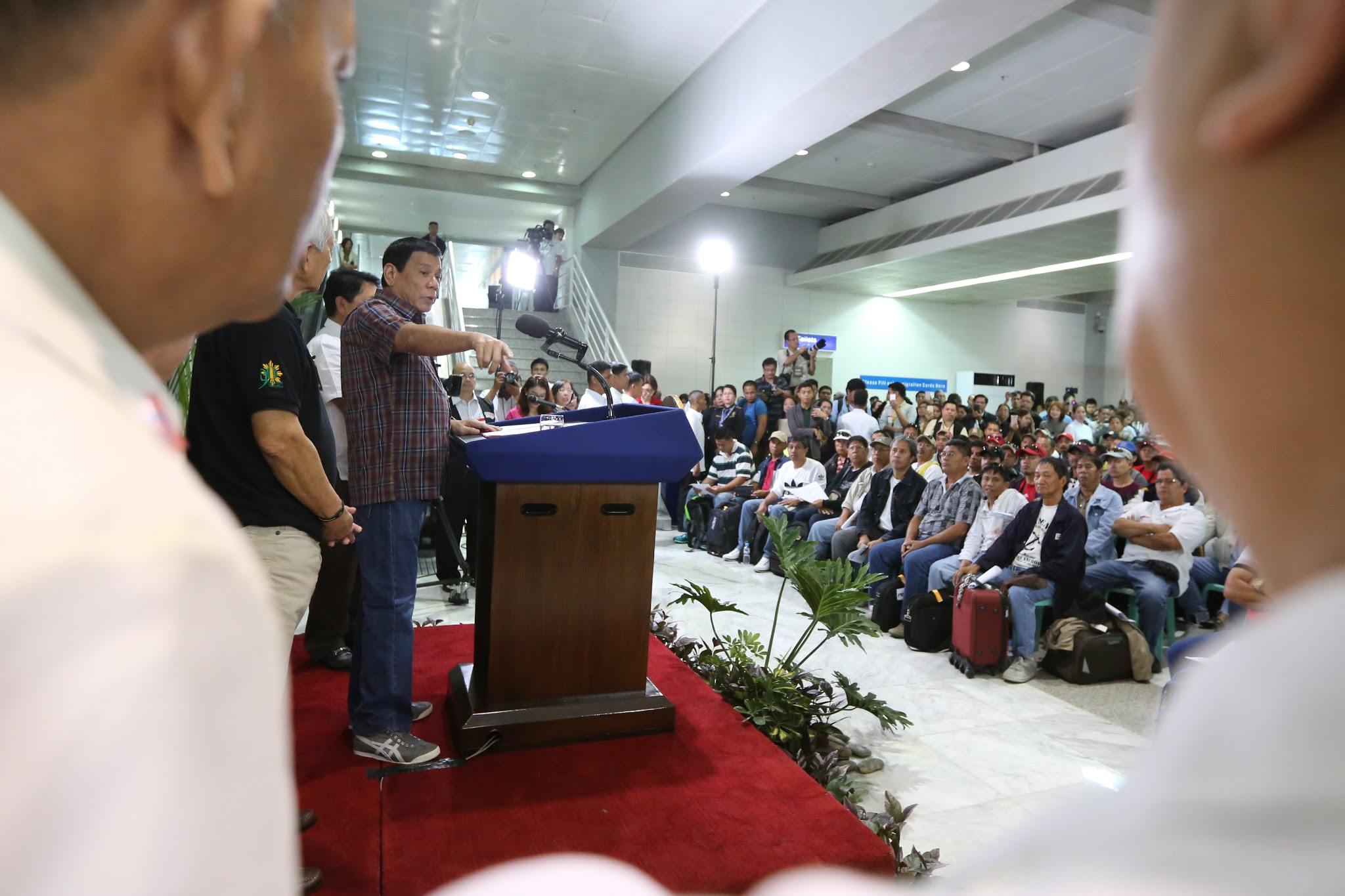
Philippines President Rodrigo Duterte speaking to a group of repatriated overseas Filipino workers from Saudi Arabia in 2016

Every year, an unknown number of Filipinos in Saudi Arabia are "victims of sexual abuses, maltreatment, unpaid salaries, and other labor malpractices," according to John Leonard Monterona, the Middle East coordinator of Migrante, a Manila-based OFW organization. Some Filipinos are attracted and transported to Saudi Arabia illegally, where they are left stranded without work. Between January and August 2008, approximately 800 throughout the country sought help at Migrante chapters, and 922 others were deported to the Philippines in the first three months of 2008 after overstaying their visa requirements. At one point in early 2008, 103 Filipinos stranded in Jeddah lived in a tent camp under a bridge before being able to be processed for deportation.

== Education ==
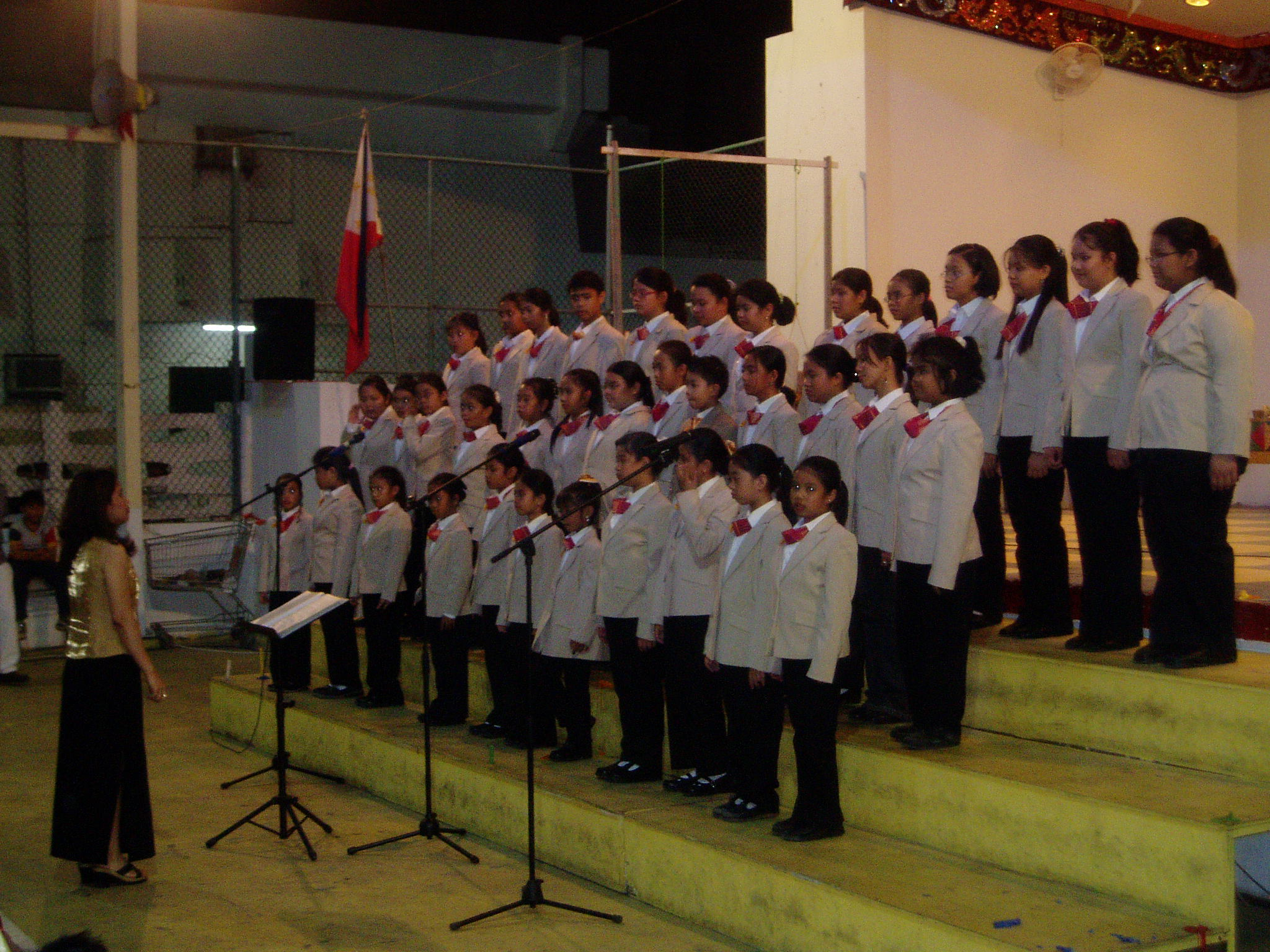
Serenata, a children's choir composed of Filipino school children in Jeddah

As of February 2006, about 75% of the Philippine international schools represented by the Commission on Filipinos Overseas (CFO) were located in Saudi Arabia. Community-owned Philippine schools, including the International Philippine School in Al Khobar (IPSA), the International Philippine School in Jeddah (IPSJ), and International Philippine School in Riyadh (IPSR), were by 2006 managed by independent school boards but were initially managed by the diplomatic missions themselves. As of 2006, Riyadh has 13 Philippine private schools and Jeddah has five Philippine private schools.

Large numbers of Philippine children came to Saudi after many Filipino workers arrived in Saudi Arabia in the 1980s. The first Philippine school in Saudi Arabia, Philippine School in Jeddah was established after the Philippine Consulate in Jeddah began making efforts to start a school in 1983, and Philippine schools were later established in Riyadh and other Saudi cities. In 2000 Saudi Arabia had nine accredited Philippine schools. By 2005 Jeddah alone had four Philippine international schools, with two more scheduled to open shortly. By 2006 there were 21 Philippine schools recognized by the CFO, reflecting a 133% growth rate from 2000.

Community international schools in Saudi Arabia are not required to separate male and female students into separate campuses and are allowed to host social activities with men and women mixed. Regis and Guzman stated that in private Philippine international schools, unlike in the community schools, many Saudi rules that are not consistent with the culture of the Philippines are enforced.

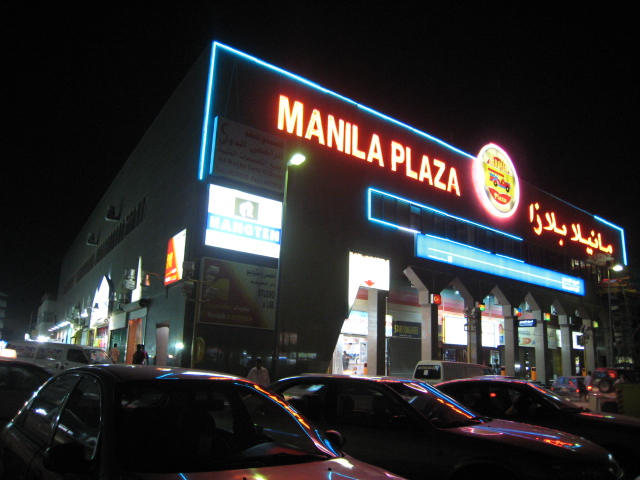
Manila Plaza, a Filipino market in Riyadh

== Notable people ==
- Ramiele Malubay - is a Filipino-American singer. She was born in Dammam, Saudi Arabia.
- Margaret Nales Wilson - is a Filipino-British model. She grew up mostly in Saudi Arabia and she spent 14 years in Jeddah.

== See also ==
- Philippines-Saudi Arabia relations
- Foreign workers in Saudi Arabia
- Migrant workers in the Gulf Cooperation Council region
