= Jenadriyah =

Cultural festival in Saudi Arabia held annually

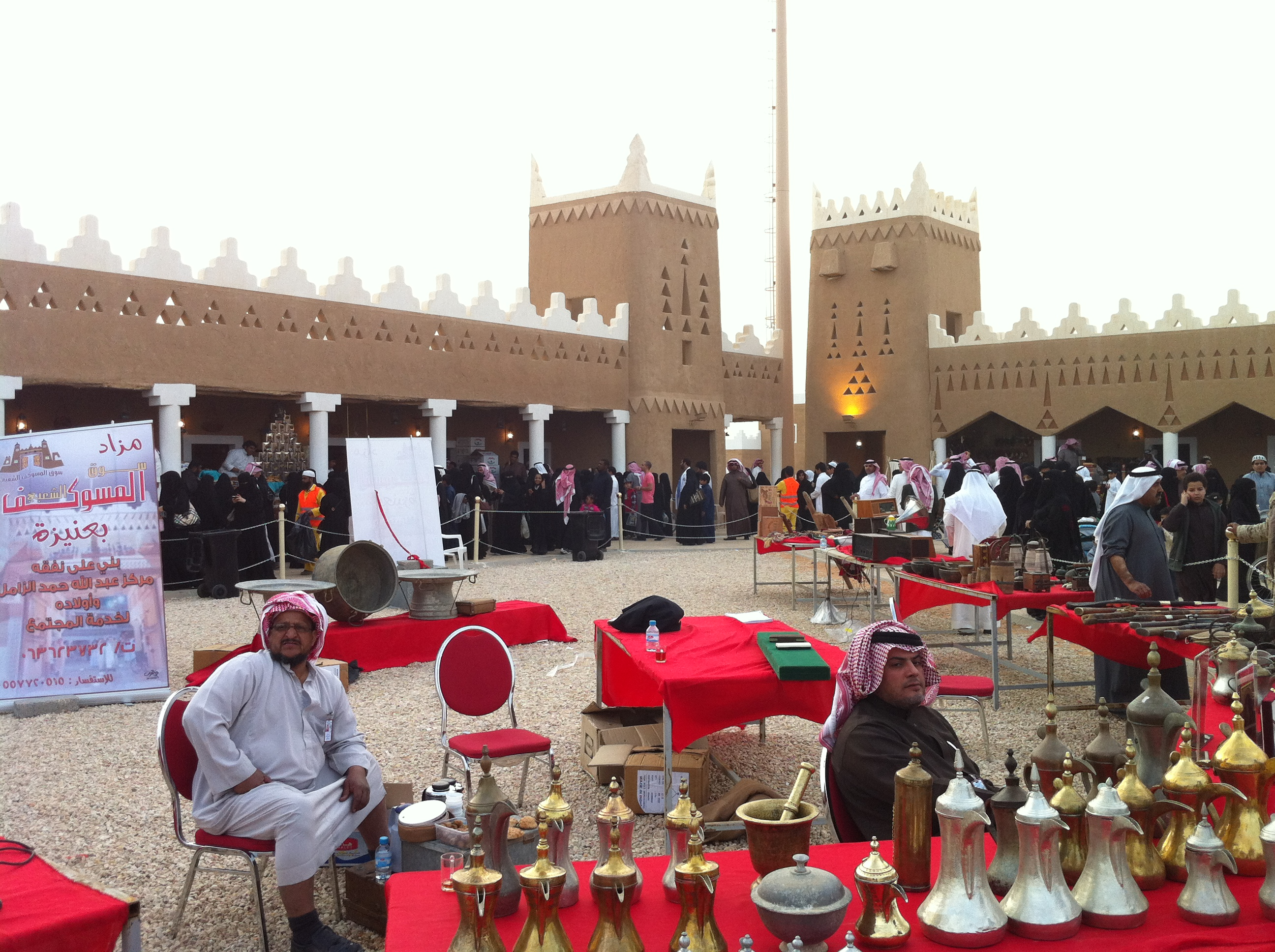
Jenadriyah 27

Al-Jenadriyah (Arabic: مهرجان الجنادرية, romanized: Maharajān al-Janādrīyah) is a cultural and heritage festival held in Jenadriyah (or Janadriyah) near Riyadh in Saudi Arabia each year, lasting for two weeks.

"King Abdullah bin Abdul Aziz was the first to organize this festival. He fostered it and developed it to become the top Arab festival that showcases the local heritage of all Arabian Peninsula regions as well as the Saudi Arabian heritage."

It was organised by the National Guard, and the first was held in 1985. Activities included a camel race, performance of local music and dancing of the Ardah and the Mizmar. The festival drew more than one million visitors every year. The festival "normally falls during the month of February or March... Long ago, Janadriyah was known as 'Rowdhat Souwais' and was mentioned by numerous historians and writers."

The last standalone Jenadriyah festival was the 33rd edition, held from December 20, 2018 to January 9, 2019. In July 2019, the Saudi cabinet transferred the responsibility of organizing the festival to the Ministry of Culture after it was under the responsibility of the Ministry of National Guard. The next festival was set to take place in November 2020; however, due to the COVID-19 pandemic in Saudi Arabia, the festival was postponed and was not held between 2020 and 2025.

In January 2026, the Saudi Press Agency announced that the Jenadriyah village had reopened, but as part of the Custodian of the Two Holy Mosques Camel Festival organized by the Saudi Camel Racing Federation.

== Events and activities ==
The festival opened with the opening ceremony master; it then proceeded with various events, including:

- Al Janadriya Operetta
- Tourism Oasis
- Saudi Ardah
- Government Pavilions
- Provincial Pavilions
- Companies and Corporate wings
- Poetry Evenings
- Heritage Village Activity
- Camel racing
- Horse racing and endurance
- Dancing
- Folk costumes
- Book fair
- Centre for documentation and pictures
- Host country of the world to participate in the festival. In 2010, the French Republic participated in the Jenadriyah 25.
- Display of traditional crafts such as pottery, weaving, woodwork, metalwork, and leatherwork

== Country participation in the festival ==
Every year Saudi Arabia has hosted a guest of honor such as:

- In 2010, the French Republic participated in the Jenadriyah 25.
- In 2011, Japan was the guest of honor country at the Jenadriyah 26.
- In 2012, South Korea was the guest of honor country at the Jenadriyah 27.
- In 2013, China was the guest of honor country at the Jenadriyah 28.
- In 2014, the United Arab Emirates was the guest of honor country at the Jenadriyah 29.

Jenadriyah 30 was originally scheduled to be held in February 2015, but the festival was cancelled and postponed one year following the death of King Abdullah bin Abdul Aziz in January 2015.

- In 2016, Germany was the guest of honor country at the Jenadriyah 30.
- In 2017, Egypt was the guest of honor at Janadriyah 31.
- In 2018, India was the guest of honor country at Janadriyah 32.
- In 2019, Indonesia was the guest of honor country at Janadriyah 33.

== See also ==
- Tourism in Saudi Arabia
