= Serenata (choir) =

Philippine children's choir in Saudi Arabia

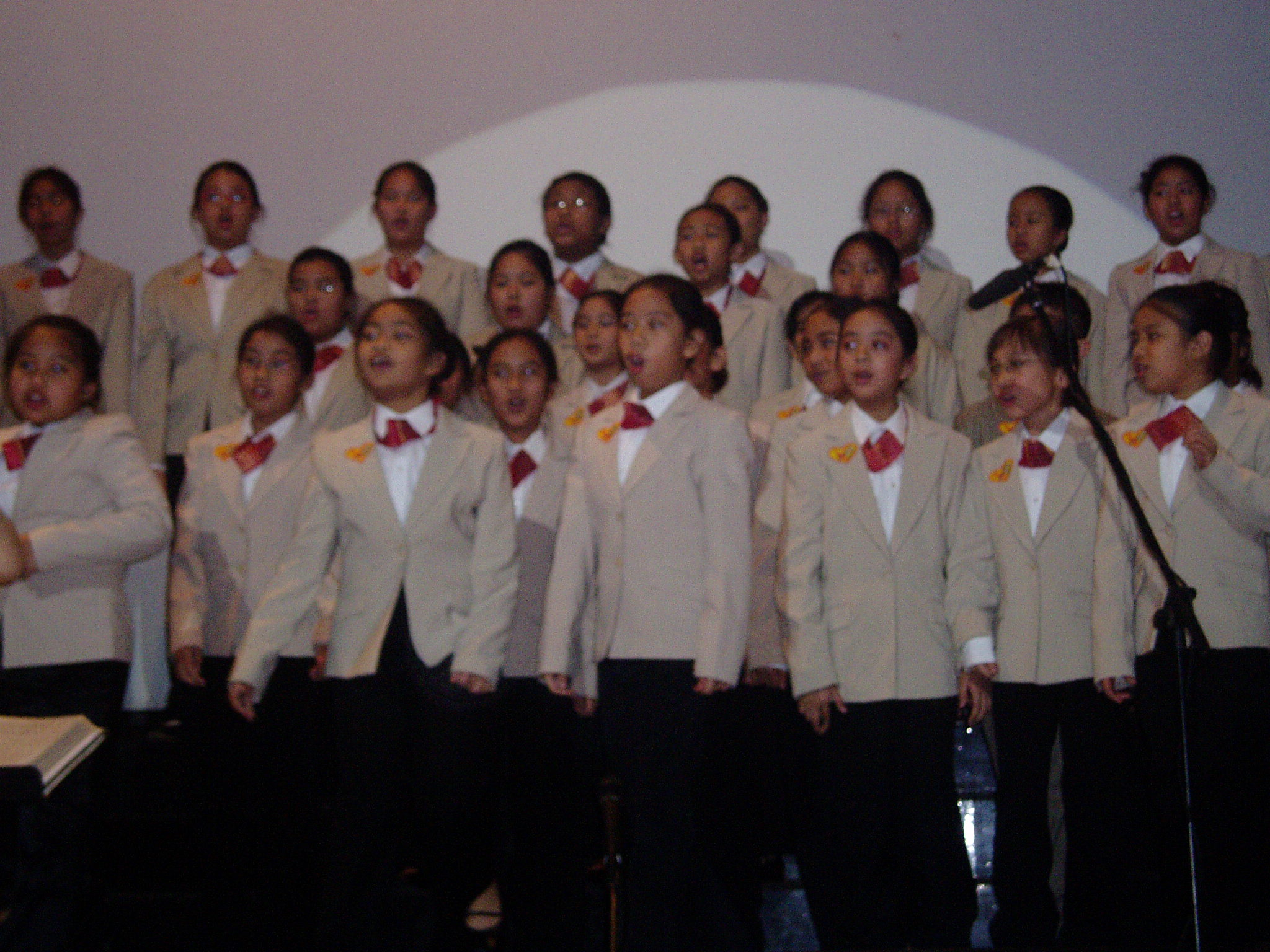
- Serenata, during its first concert held March 3, 2006.

Background information
- Origin: Jeddah, Saudi Arabia
- Years active: 2005–2019 (last concert only male choir placed in 2020)

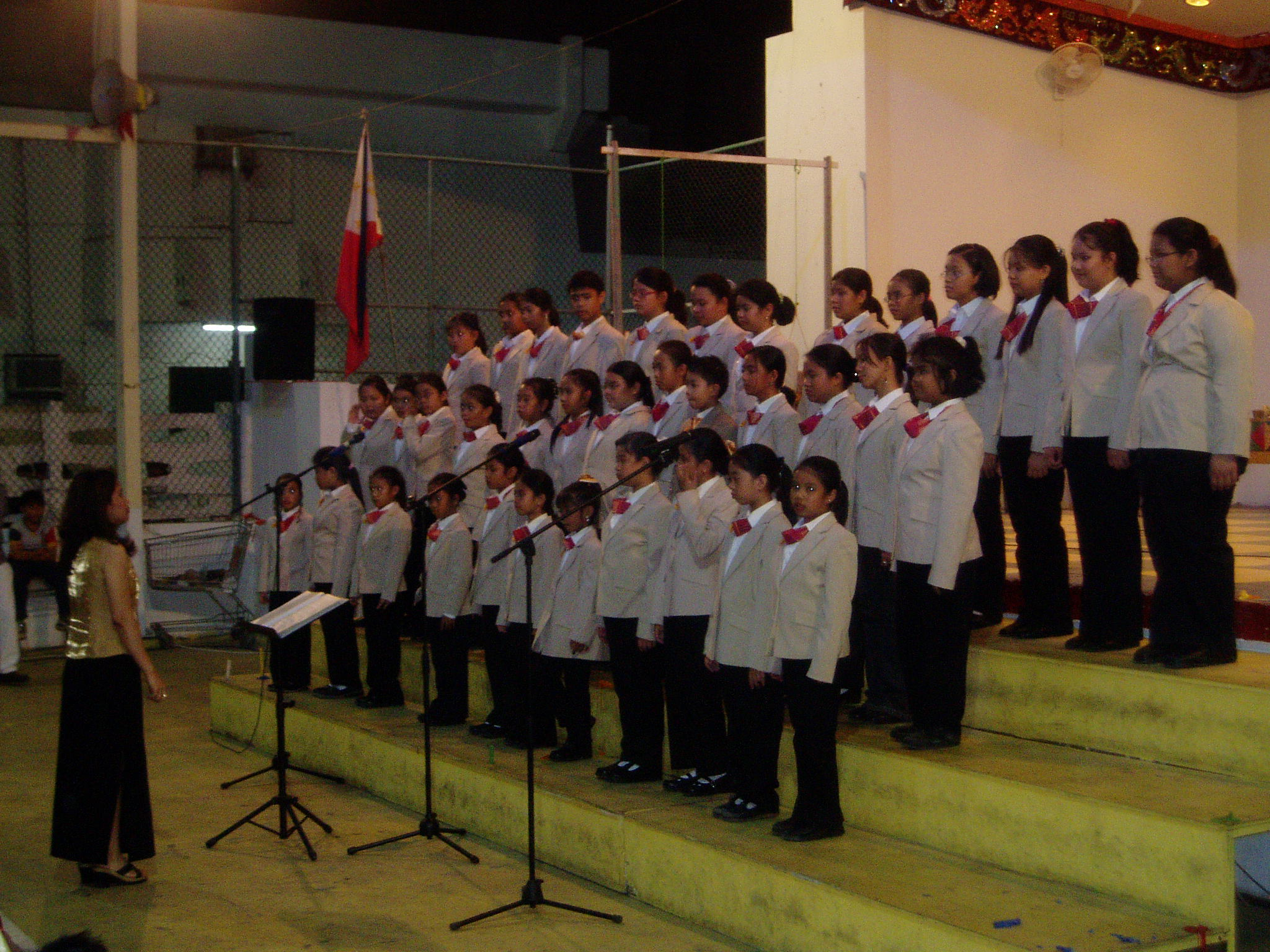
Serenata during a performance at the International Philippine School in Jeddah.

Serenata is a Philippine children's choir in Jeddah, Saudi Arabia.

== History ==
Serenata was founded in 2005 through the pioneering efforts of Sylvia de los Santos, Desil Manapat and Louis Bautista. It was accredited by the Philippine Consulate General in Jeddah on August 25, 2005.

=== First season ===
Serenata held its major concert on March 3, 2006, in the Saudi–German Hospital Auditorium, also located in Jeddah, Saudi Arabia.

=== Second season ===
The auditions for the second season of Serenata were held at the Sunrise International School on July 13 and July 21, 2006. Some of the 45 children who were members from the first season were retained based on the criteria by de los Santos. The organization also gained a new chairperson, Joey Samonte, after Manapat left for Canada. New members also joined.

Serenata became a mix of old and new members, including 37 girls and 4 boys coming from various Philippine and International Schools in Jeddah. Season 2 debuted during the Asian Festival held on October 27, 2006, at the International Indian School Jeddah, before Asian dignitaries and a crowd of Filipino and foreign audiences. The festival was organized by the Asia Consuls General Club (ACGC) with the support of the Saudi Ministry of Foreign Affairs.

On November 16, 2006, Serenata opened the Cultural Festival of the Al-Hekma International School in Jeddah.

Serenata joined a host of Filipino organizations in Jeddah by celebrating the Overseas Filipino Workers (OFW) Month on December 7, 2006. It concluded the evening-long program with "Harana: Alay ng Serenata", a free mini-concert dedicated to the Overseas Filipino Workers under the care of the Philippine Consulate General in Jeddah.

On January 25, 2007, Serenata guested at the awarding ceremonies of the Jeddah Schools Olympics held at UMEA Sports Complex, upon the invitation of Sunrise International School, the host of the Olympics. Two days later, the choir sang at the Saudi German Hospital Auditorium in a tribute organized by the Filipino Community of Saudi German Hospital in honor of Dr. Mohammed Fahim Mousa.

On February 8, 2007, Serenata performed at the Music and Arts Festival of GEMS International School. They closed the 2nd season with its major concert, "Reachin' Out", on March 16, 2007. It was a charity concert designed to provide financial and material assistance to poor/disadvantaged schools in the Philippines. The concert is likewise Serenata's official activity-entry to the Philippine Arts Festival 2007 organized by the Philippine Consulate General in Jeddah, in line with the observance of the National Arts Month in February 2007 as declared by the Philippines’ National Commission for Culture and the Arts.

== Composition of the choir ==
The choir is usually composed of 45 Filipino children. These children study in different schools in Jeddah. They were chosen during the auditions.

== Performances ==
=== Concerts ===
Its first major performance was its concert in the Saudi German Hospital Auditorium, last March 3, 2006. The concert was conducted by Mrs. de los Santos. The concert's choreographer was Ms. Reneegrace Villarosa-Divina. The concert's beneficiary was for the landslide victims in Leyte last 2005. Serenata was able to raise 100,000 pesos for the beneficiary. The major sponsor of the concert was KAB Holding of Jeddah, Saudi Arabia.

The second major concert was held at the Al Waha Hotel Ballroom in Jeddah on March 16, 2007. Under the musical direction of Ms. Sylvia delos Santos and directed by Ms. Reneegrace Villarosa-Divina. This concert benefited four schools in the Philippines, namely - M. Casho Elementary School (San Jose del Carmen. Talisay, Camarines Norte, Philippines), Cantuyoc Elementary School (Cantuyoc, Jagna, Bohol, Philippines), Linantangan Elementary School (Mamasapano, Maguindanao) and Jamaitu Dhikra Al-Islamia School (Marawi City, Philippines).

=== Other performances ===
- October 2005 - Order of Knights of Rizal (International Philippine School in Jeddah (IPSJ), Jeddah, Saudi Arabia)
- December 2005 - "Harana sa Bahay-Kalinga" (Philippine Consulate, Jeddah, Saudi Arabia)
- January 2006 - Music and Arts Festival (Al Hekma International School, Jeddah, Saudi Arabia)
- January 2006 - Milo Sports Week (Sunrise International School, Jeddah, Saudi Arabia)
- October 2006 - Asian Festival (Indian International School, Jeddah, Saudi Arabia)
- November 2006 - Cultural Festival (Al Hekma International School, Jeddah, Saudi Arabia)
- December 7, 2006 - Harana..Alay ng Serenata (Philippine Consulate - Jeddah, Saudi Arabia)
- December 21, 2006 - Cultural Festival (GEMS International School - Jeddah, Saudi Arabia)
- March 16, 2007 - "Reachin'Out" - the second major concert - Al Waha Hotel, Jeddah, Saudi Arabia
- December 7, 2007 - Harana.. a Mini Concert (IPSJ)
- February 8, 2008 - "Serenata..Journeyin' On" (American International School of Jeddah (AISJ), Jeddah, Saudi Arabia)
- June 12, 2008 - "Himig Handog" (in celebration of the 110th Philippine Independence Day - Phil. Consulate - Jeddah)
- December 5, 2008 - "Harana...Alay ng Serenata" - Elite Hall, Al Waha Hotel, Jeddah, Saudi Arabia
- February 6, 2009 - "SERENATA ... With Strings Attached" major concert - (AISJ)
- September 22, 2009 - "FILCOM Night" with H.E. Pres. Gloria Macapagal Arroyo held at the Princess Hall of Habitat Hotel.
- February 16, 2012 - "SERENATA...Shines at Seven" (AISJ)
- February 22, 2013 - "SERENATA...Celebrates 8" (AISJ)
- February 2014 - "SERENATA...Live the Dream" (AISJ)
- February 2015 - "SERENATA... Opus 10" - held at AISJ and JPGS as well as at KAUST in March 2014
- March 26, 2016 - "SERENATA...Beyond the Horizon" - held at AISJ and KAUST
- March 18, 2017 - "SERENATA...We've Got Male" (AISJ)
- March 24, 2018 - "SERENATA...Thankful" (AISJ)
- March 24, 2019 - 14th Concert Season performance (AISJ)
