= International Philippine School in Jeddah =

- المدرسة الفلبينية العالمية بجدة

Location
- Az Zaamah, Mishrifah, Jeddah 23336, Saudi Arabia; Jeddah; Saudi Arabia; 21.5450342°N 39.2027961°E

Information
- Established: 1981
- Grades: Pre-elementary through senior high school
- Enrollment: 1,400+
- Website: www.ipsjksa.com

International Philippine School in Jeddah (IPSJ; Arabic: المدرسة الفلبينية العالمية بجدة) is a Philippine international school in Jeddah, Saudi Arabia. It serves levels pre-elementary through senior high school. As of 2005 it had over 1,000 students, making it the world's largest Philippine international school.

== History ==
IPSJ was the first-ever Philippine international school organized by the Department of Foreign Affairs of the Philippines. The school marks its year of foundation as 1981. In 1981 the Philippine Embassy which was in Jeddah before started establishing a school which became the Philippine School in Jeddah (PSJ).

It was the first Philippine international school to become the largest one worldwide. Czarina Valerie A. Regis and Allan B. de Guzman, authors of "A system within a system: the Philippine schools overseas," wrote that Philippine overseas schools (PSO) based in Saudi Arabia, "the PSJ may be cited as the richest source of learning experiences in PSO management" due to both its successes and failures.

Francis R. Salud of Arab News wrote in 2005 that there had been "perennial infighting among parents for control of the school". Regis and Guzman reported that their "futile interventions by Philippine officialdom" as well as violent incidents and mismanagement, and that three Philippine consuls general had their careers affected by these issues; therefore PSJ became well known for these negative traits and its "chaotic history". Due to the history of the PSJ, there were rules and regulations governing Philippine international schools and the establishment of the Inter-Agency Committee for PSOs (IAC-PSO).

== See also ==
- Filipinos in Saudi Arabia
- List of schools in Saudi Arabia
- Serenata, Philippine children's choir based in Jeddah
