= The Royal Institute of Traditional Arts =

- المعهد الملكي للفنون التقليدية
- Abbreviation: Wrth
- Formation: 2021
- Type: Government cultural and educational institution
- Headquarters: Riyadh, Saudi Arabia
- Chief executive officer: Suzan Alyahya
- Parent organization: Ministry of Culture
- Website: wrth.edu.sa

The Royal Institute of Traditional Arts (Wrth) is a Saudi government cultural and educational institution established in 2021. It offers apprenticeships, short courses and higher education programs in traditional arts and crafts, including pottery, Al Sadu weaving, product development and digital heritage.

== History ==
Prince Bader bin Abdullah bin Farhan Al Saud, Saudi Minister of Culture, had approved the plan to launch the Royal Institute of Traditional Arts at the Royal Arts Complex in Riyadh on October 22, 2019, as part of the Art Academies Initiative that was announced within the first batch of the Ministry of Culture and the Quality of Life Program initiatives in March 2019. The Minister of Culture had earlier announced the commissioning of market studies to identify the need for academies, with the first one specializing in heritage and traditional arts and crafts.

In March 2021, the Saudi Council of Ministers approved the establishment of the institute. Its educational programs began in September of that year, with an initial phase that included training in palm-leaf weaving and plans for courses on Al Sadu weaving and UNESCO cultural conventions.

== Mandate ==
The institute focuses on education, research and the preservation of Saudi traditional arts. Its stated objectives include training students and practitioners, supporting the work of traditional artists and craftspeople, and contributing to the preservation of tangible and intangible cultural heritage.

== Programs ==
The institute organizes its educational offerings into three categories: apprenticeship programs, academic programs, and short courses. Areas of study include textile and embroidery arts, material and construction arts, book arts, traditional performing arts and music, museum studies, heritage, and antiquities.

== Visual identity ==
In February 2024, the institute introduced a new institutional identity and strategy under the name “Wrth.” The accompanying visual identity incorporates references to Al Sadu patterns, the rababa, floral motifs used in Saudi architecture and fashion, Arabic calligraphy, and the seal of King Abdulaziz.
