= Bader bin Farhan Al Saud =

Saudi minister of culture

His Excellency Bader bin Farhan Al Saud
- بدر بن عبد الله بن فرحان
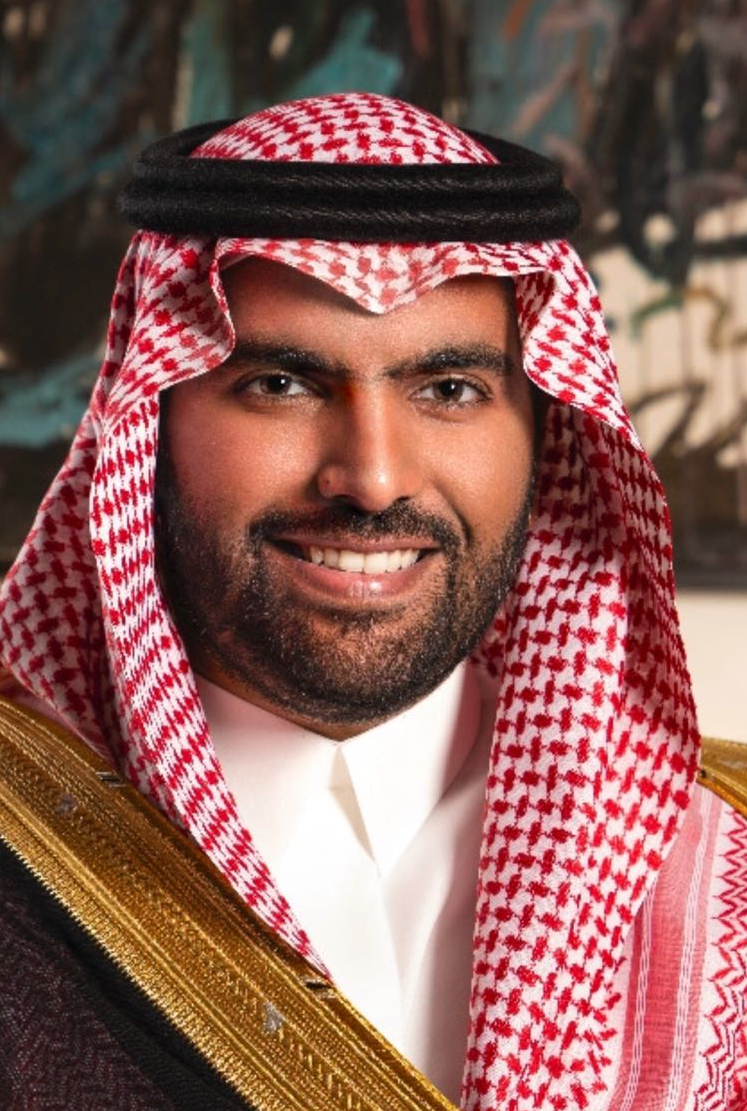
- Official portrait, 2018

Saudi Minister of Culture
- Incumbent
- Assumed office 2 June 2018
- Monarch: Salman
- Prime Minister: Salman; Mohammed bin Salman
- Preceded by: Office established

Governor of the Royal Commission for Al-'Ula
- Incumbent
- Assumed office June 2017
- Appointed by: King Salman
- Chairman: Mohammed bin Salman

Personal details
- Born: 16 August 1985 (age 41) Riyadh, Saudi Arabia
- Education: King Saud University

Bader bin Abdullah bin Mohammed bin Farhan Al Saud (Arabic: بدر بن عبد الله بن محمد بن فرحان آل سعود Badr bin ʿAbdullāh bin Moḥammed bin Farḥān Āl Suʿūd; born 16 September 1985), also known as Badr bin Farhan, is a Saudi Arabian businessman and politician who is a member of the Saudi royal family and the inaugural Saudi Arabian Minister of Culture. He is in charge of various key positions directly related to the execution of Saudi Vision 2030. Prior to his appointment as Minister of Culture, he was the chairman of the Saudi Research and Marketing Group. He was also appointed Governor of the Royal Commission for Al-'Ula Governorate in July 2017.

In 2017, he enacted the most expensive purchase of a painting in history, being Salvator Mundi, painted at least by Leonardo da Vinci. It was thereafter transferred to the Louvre Abu Dhabi.

== Early life and education ==
Prince Bader was born on 16 September 1985. He received a bachelor's degree in law from King Saud University. Bader began his career as a business executive and investor in the fields of energy, real estate and telecoms.

== Government positions ==
From December 2015 to June 2018, Prince Bader was chairman of the Saudi Research and Marketing Group (SRMG), a large media publishing company with close ties to the Mohammed bin Salman government in Saudi Arabia. In September 2017, the company made a deal with Bloomberg to launch its first Arabic-language news service, Bloomberg Al Arabiya; followed by the acquisition of a 51% stake in the Saudi online financial news service Argaam.

=== Royal Commission for Al-Ula ===
In June 2017, Prince Bader was appointed as governor of the Royal Commission for Al-Ula, a newly established body to develop the 2,000 year-old historical site of al-Ula, in Madinah province, into a cultural attraction. In April 2018 he signed an agreement with the French minister of Europe and foreign affairs Jean-Yves Le Drian to involve French expertise in the restoration of al-Ula over a ten-year period.

=== Minister of Culture and other positions ===
In April 2018, Prince Bader was appointed to the board of the General Authority for Culture.

On 2 June 2018, Prince Bader was appointed as Saudi Arabia's first minister of culture and stepped down as chairman of SRMG. The ministry's mandate is to advance the cultural programs within Saudi Vision 2030. He said the ministry would seek to enhance Saudi identity and would support the efforts of young people in creative fields.

In November 2019, he was appointed as Chairman of the Saudi National Committee for Education, Culture, and Science. He chairs the Board of Directors for Taif Development Authority. He is on the boards of the Misk Art Institute, Arabian Leopard Fund, Panthera, and the International Alliance for the Protection of Heritage in Conflict Areas (ALIPH), as well as various Saudi cultural institutions.

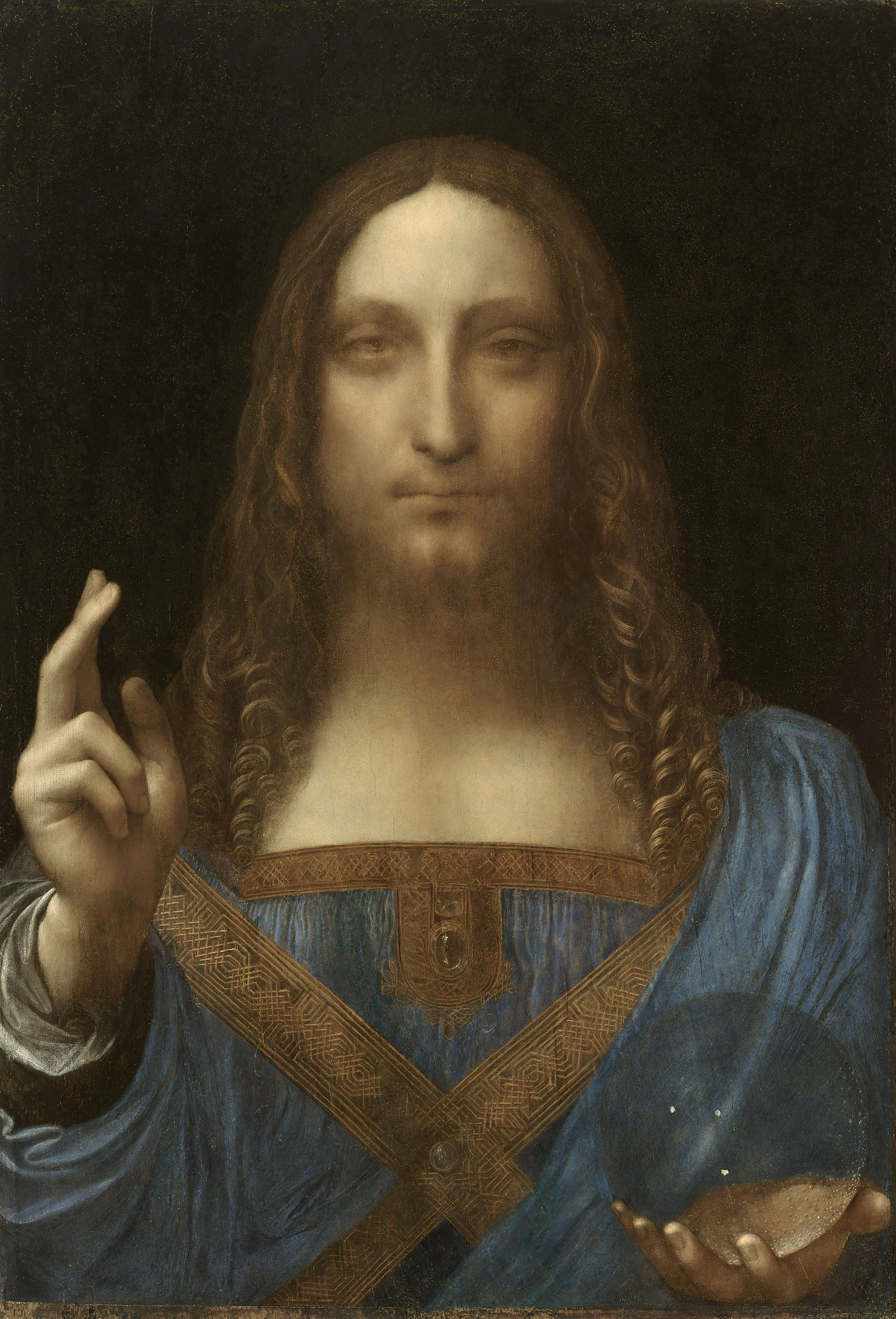
Salvator Mundi by (at least) Leonardo da Vinci

== Purchase of the most expensive painting recorded in history ==
On 15 November 2017, the Salvator Mundi, attributed in whole or in part to Leonardo da Vinci, was purchased at auction during Christie's New York's Post-War and Contemporary Art Evening Sale for $450 million, the highest price ever paid for a painting up until this date.

The New York Times disclosed Prince Badr's successful bid on 6 December 2017, sparking speculation that the acquisition might have been executed on behalf of Saudi Crown Prince Mohammed Bin Salman. The Wall Street Journal reported that same date, citing US intelligence assessments having named Badr as the proxy buyer for Bin Salman. One day later Christie's published a statement confirming that the country's Department of Culture and Tourism had acquired the painting for display at the Louvre Abu Dhabi.
