= Saudi National Orchestra and Choir =

Saudi national professional musical group

- Orchestra
- Native name: الأوركسترا والكورال الوطني السعودي
- Founded: 2021
- Location: Saudi Arabia

The Saudi National Orchestra and Choir is a Saudi national professional musical group formed in 2021 by the Music Commission, one of 11 sector-specific commissions under the Ministry of Culture.

== Tours and performances ==
=== Marvels of Saudi Orchestra ===
It is an initiative by the Music Commission in collaboration with the Theater and Performing Arts Commission that toured several international cities. The tour began in the French capital of Paris and then moved on to Mexico City in Mexico and New York City in the United States.
