= General Authority for Culture (Saudi Arabia) =

Government agency

Kingdom of Saudi Arabia General Authority for Culture
- الهيئة العامة للثقافة

Agency overview
- Jurisdiction: Saudi Arabia
- Agency executive: Ahmed Almazyad, Governor

General Authority for Culture was a Saudi government body responsible for all cultural activities in the Kingdom, it announced its establishment by royal decree on May 7, 2016, and its chairman Ahmed Almazyad. The authority was later turned into a ministry, to officially be named the Ministry of Culture.

In April 2018, a new board of directors was formed to supervise and manage the cultural activities in the Kingdom. The board of directors involves three women, two of whom are theater and film directors.

== Culture sectors ==
The authority developed sectors with aims to support the creativity and talent in the country; these sectors are :

- Literature.
- Film and Media Content.
- Theatre and Performing Arts.
- Music.
- Visual Arts.
