= Ministry of Culture (Saudi Arabia) =

Government ministry of Saudi Arabia

- وزارة الثقافة

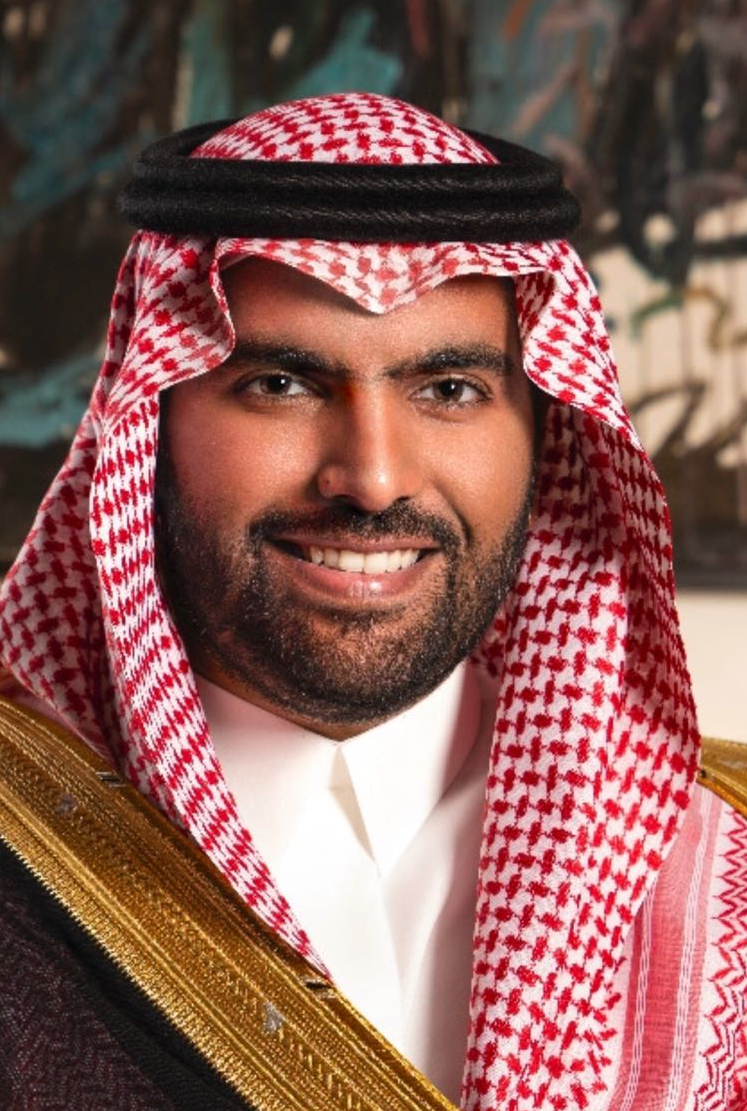
- Bader bin Abdullah, the current Minister of Culture since 2 June 2018.

Agency overview
- Formed: 2 June 2018; 8 years ago
- Jurisdiction: Government of Saudi Arabia
- Headquarters: Riyadh
- Minister responsible: Bader bin Abdullah
- Child agency: See list
- Website: Official English Website

The Ministry of Culture (Arabic: وزارة الثقافة) is a government ministry in Saudi Arabia that oversees the Kingdom’s cultural sector and is responsible for developing policies related to culture in Saudi Arabia, heritage, arts, and creative industries.

== History ==
The Ministry of Culture was established on 2 June 2018, when the Ministry of Culture and Information was split into two independent entities: the Ministry of Media and the Ministry of Culture.

From its founding, the ministry focused on preserving and promoting the Kingdom’s cultural heritage, supporting local creative talent, and positioning Saudi Arabia as a global cultural destination in line with Saudi Vision 2030. In 2019, it launched the National Cultural Strategy, which identified 16 key cultural sub-sectors such as heritage, film, fashion, music, literature, and culinary arts to guide its work and support economic growth and quality of life.

Since its creation, the ministry has expanded Saudi Arabia’s cultural infrastructure and programs. In 2019, it took over the organization of the Riyadh International Book Fair. In 2021, it established the Saudi National Orchestra and Choir, and the Royal Institute of Traditional Arts to nurture traditional skills. Also in 2021, the ministry launched the "Cultural Years" initiative, assigning a theme related to Saudi culture to each year to highlight different aspects of the Kingdom’s heritage and arts. In 2025, it introduced initiatives like the development of Saudi Fonts.

== List of ministers ==
No.	Portrait	Minister	Took office	Left office	Time in office
1		Bader bin Abdullah	2 June 2018	Incumbent	8 years, 88 days

== Subordinate agencies ==
The following list contains the commissions operating under the Ministry of Culture:

Logo	Name	Website
	Film Commission	Official Website
	Music Commission (see also Music of Saudi Arabia)	Official Website
	Fashion Commission	Official Website
	Heritage Commission (see also List of World Heritage Sites in Saudi Arabia)	Official Website
	Libraries Commission (see also Libraries in Saudi Arabia)	Official Website
	Museums Commission (see also List of museums in Saudi Arabia)	Official Website
	Visual Arts Commission	Official Website
	Culinary Arts Commission (see also Saudi Arabian cuisine)	Official Website
	Architecture & Design Commission (see also Architecture of Saudi Arabia)	Official Website
	Theater & Performing Arts Commission (see also Theatre of Saudi Arabia)	Official Website
	Literature, Publishing & Translation Commission (see also Saudi literature)	Official Website

== Cultural awards ==
Cultural Awards are awards presented to Saudi individuals, cultural groups and organizations for their cultural contributions. The awards are presented in an annual event organized by the Ministry of Culture. The Cultural Awards were launched in 2020.

The following is a list of award categories:

=== Main awards ===
- Cultural Pioneer Award
- Youth Cultural Award
- International Cultural Excellence Award
- Business Owners Award
- Cultural Institutions Award (For-Profit)
- Cultural Institutions Award (Non-Profit)

=== Sector awards ===
- Literature Award
- Publishing Award
- Theater and Performing Arts Award
- Culinary Arts Award
- Architecture and Design Award
- Translation Award
- Fashion Award
- Film Award
- National Heritage Award
- Music Award
- Visual Arts Award

== Cultural years ==
Starting in 2020, the Ministry of Culture began dedicating each calendar year to a specific theme representing the Culture of Saudi Arabia. This initiative celebrates traditional heritage, national customs, and future-focused innovations.

This is a list containing the designated years and their corresponding names:

Logo	Year	Name	Website	Ref
	2020; 2021	Year of Arabic Calligraphy	Official Page	
	2022	Year of Saudi Coffee	Official Page	
	2023	Year of Arabic Poetry	Official Page	
	2024	Year of the Camel	Official Page	
	2025	Year of Handicrafts	Official Page	
	2026	Year of Artificial Intelligence	–	

== See also ==
- Ministries of Saudi Arabia
