= Thee Ain =

Abandoned human settlement in Saudi Arabia

- ذي عين (Arabic)
- Location within Saudi Arabia
- 19°46′02.8″N 41°26′03.2″E
- Location: Saudi Arabia
- Region: Al Bahah Region

The village of Thee Ain (Arabic: ذي عين), also known as Dhi Ayn or Zee Ain village, is in the Al-Mikhwat province of the Al-Baha Region, Saudi Arabia. The village is characterized by houses built from polished stones and dating back to the 8th century. It is located to the southwest of the city of Al Makhwah about 20 km from the village. The village includes more than 40 houses and a mosque adjacent to the river. Nearby forts protected them from raids.

== Etymology ==
The village was named for the water that flows from the nearby mountains. The river has several branches, each with a different name. There is a local legend that a man lost his stick in one of the valleys, and to retrieve it he followed the river until he arrived in the village and gathered its people and extracted the stick after the excavation of the eye.

== History ==
The village was established in the tenth century AH, and witnessed many invasions between the tribes before the unification of the Kingdom by King Abdul Aziz Al Saud. One of the most important invasions against the region was when they met the armies of Zahran and Ghamd tribes on the one hand with the army of Muhammad Ali Pasha. Ali Pasha and known tombs as "graves of the Turks".

Osmanli provided a history claiming the presence of large quantities of high quality marble and metals. The marble was used during the expansion of the Grand Mosque.

== Climate ==
The climate of the village is hot in summer and mild in winter because it is part of the Tihamah region, at about 1985 meters of elevation. The rain is heavy in the summer and medium in the winter.

== Agriculture ==
This village is known for its agricultural crops such as bananas, Kadi, basil, lemon and palm trees, stores, and scenic river.

== Housing ==
The village consists of 49 houses, of which 9 are single, 19 in two, 11 in three, and 10 in four. The village was built on the Madamek wall system and the walls are approximately 70 to 90 centimeters thick. The large rooms are decorated with columns known as zafer. Above the Sidr sits a type of stone known as "prayer". The stones are covered with mud. Lower floors are used for reception, sitting and sleeping floors. Some buildings have been in existence since the beginning of the village.

== Restoration ==
The Saudi Tourism Authority allocated 16 million riyals for the project of rehabilitating the village, which aims to restore and develop the village and turn it into a tourist site. The project was divided into three phases over a period of five years. The first phase included the rehabilitation of the main corridor of the village and the establishment of sessions along the corridor to the waterfall and the reopening of the mosque and rehabilitation of a number of buildings to make it a museum in addition to the establishment of a visitor center and restaurant and public toilets.

== Gallery ==
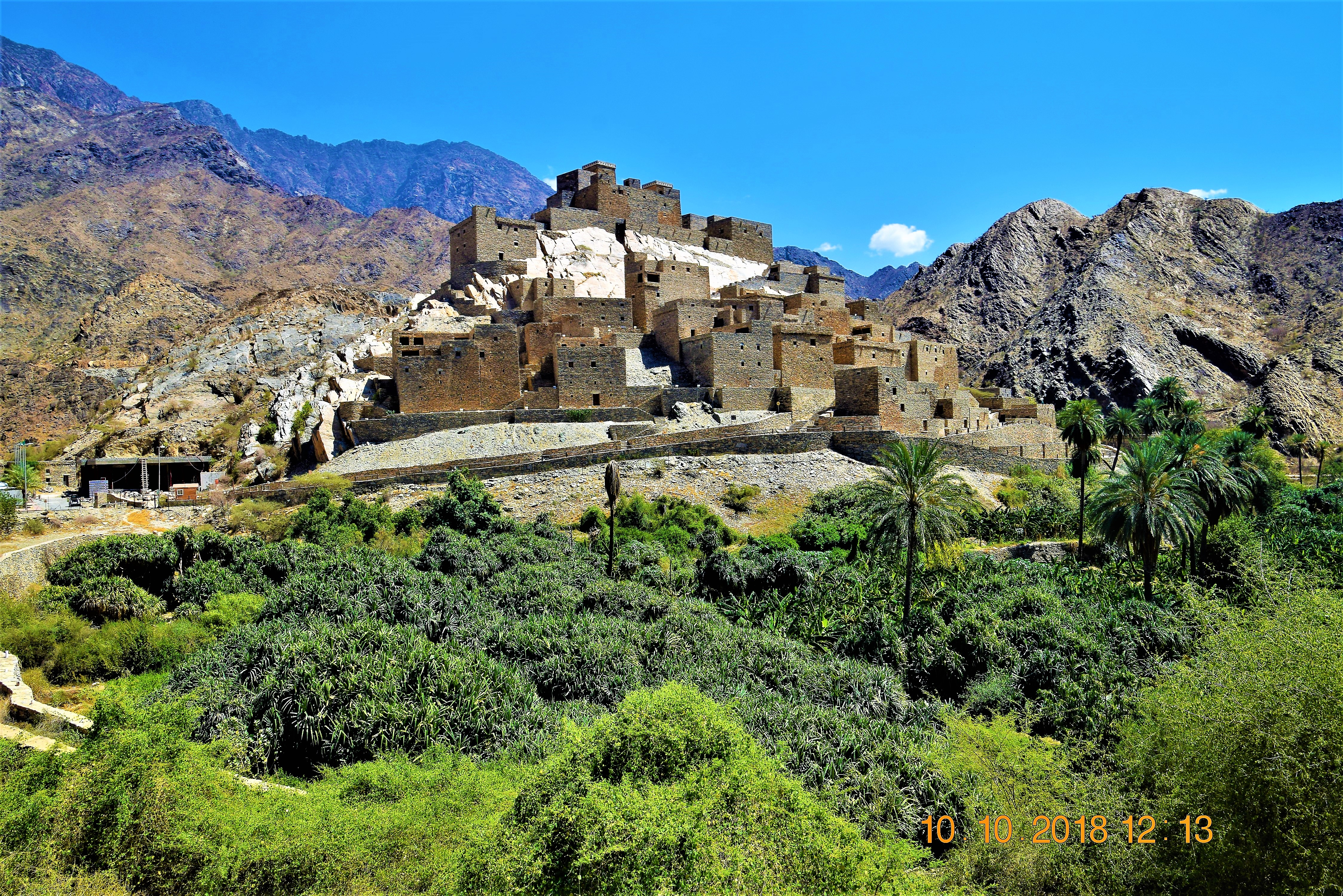
Thee Ain Historic Village

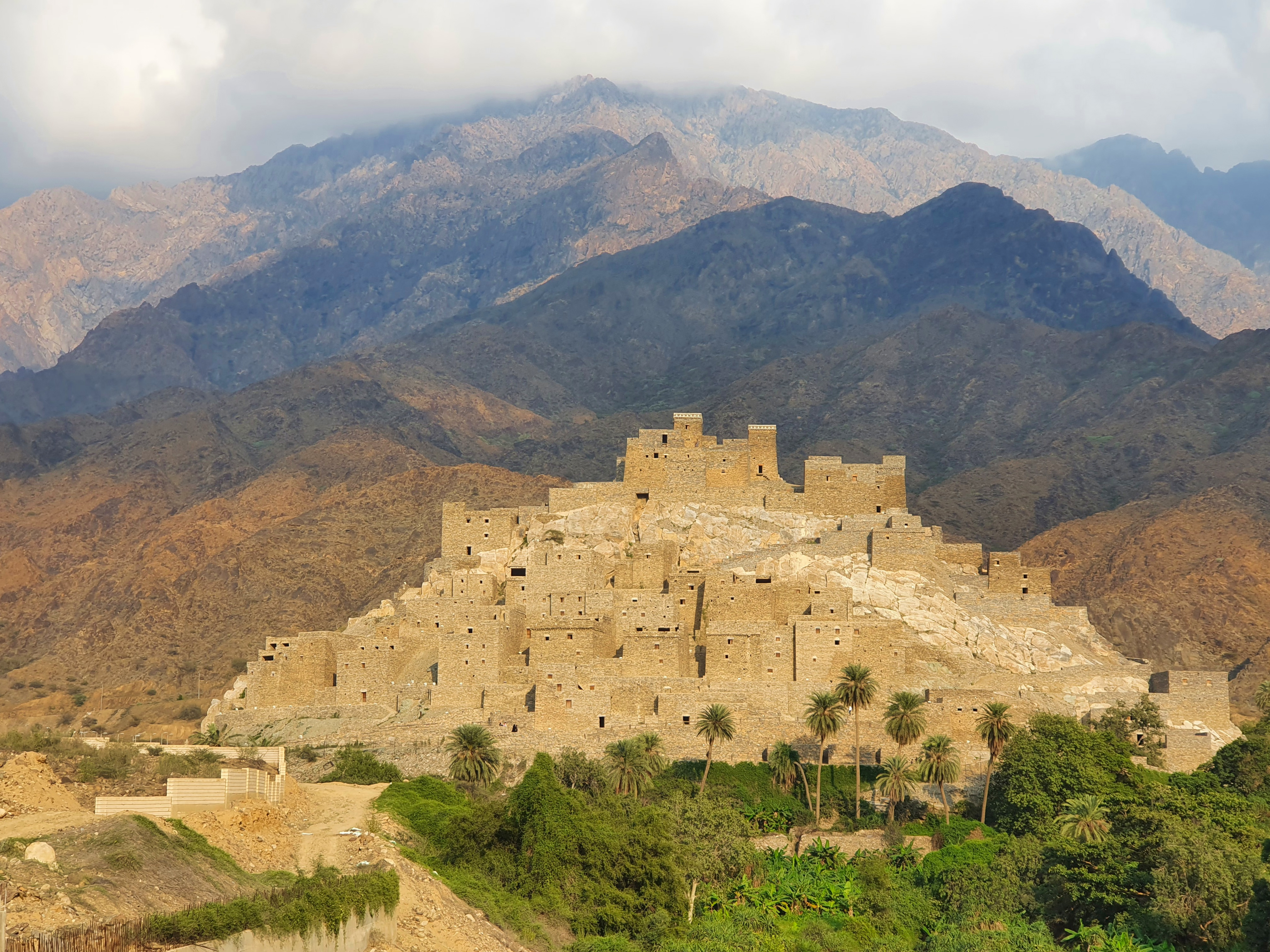
The mountainous landscape surrounding the village

== Bibliography ==
^ A B B D "Village of Ain". Saudi Tourism. See it on 19 January 2015. ^ ABT Khalid Khaled (September 9, 2014). "In Pictures .." The Eye "Saudi mythology village that fascinates tourists." Newspaper previously. See it on 19 January 2015. ^ AB "« The eye »archaeological visitors to receive on Eid al-Adha. Al Sharq Newspaper. 6 October 2014. See it on 19 January 2015. ^ "The High Commissioner agrees to apply for the registration of 10 sites on the UNESCO list." Newspaper previously. 15 November 2014. See it on 19 January 2015. ^ ABT "Tourism Authority of the« Middle East »: the transformation of the village of Ein Ain archaeological to a tourist, economic and cultural resource. Al Sharq Al Awsat Newspaper. 5 June 2009. See it on January 19, 2015. ^ "The village of Ain the archaeological .. History overlooking the summit of a white hill." Al Madina Newspaper. 25 January 2012. See it on 19 January 2015. ^ "16 million to complete the development of the village of Ain the heritage." Okaz Newspaper. 28 November 2013. See it on January 19, 2015.
