= Architecture of Saudi Arabia =

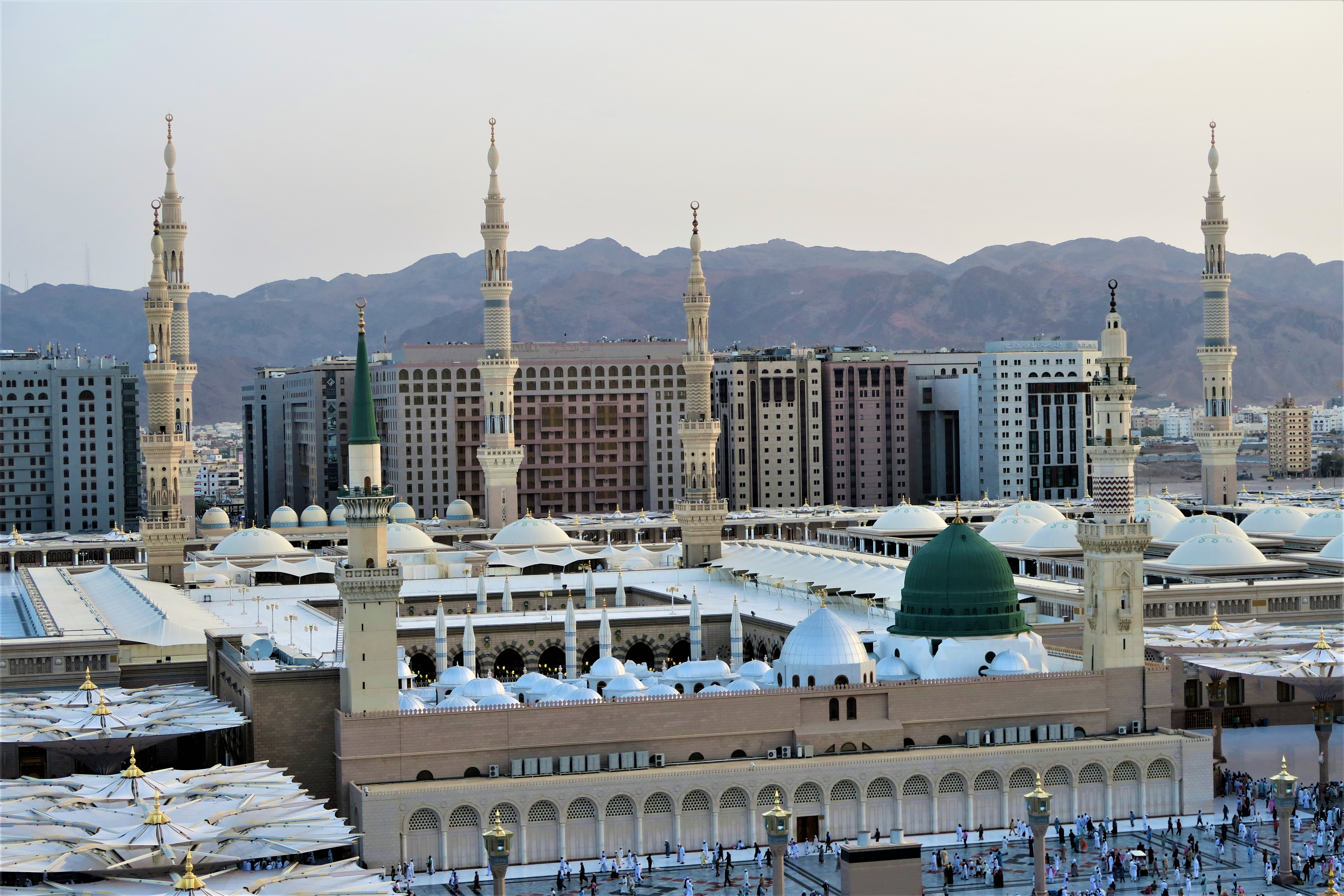
Prophet's Mosque in Medina

Architecture of Saudi Arabia was not different in the pre-oil era during the early 1930s from what it was across the past centuries. Construction and building activities followed a simple and modest style back then, as there was a lack of specialized architects in the modern sense. Instead, native communities would erect their own structures manually through the efforts of builders using basic means and local materials in what came to be known as "traditional architecture." Every region in Saudi Arabia was famous for its own brand of architecture that expressed its artistic taste. Building materials used at that time were sourced from the local environment, such as clay, rock, palm fronds, and wood. Similarly, the architectural styles passed on from generation to generation reflected each region's climatic and environmental conditions.

== Vernacular architecture ==
Ancient tombs in Mada'in Salih (Hegra) built by the Nabataean Arabs

The characteristic of vernacular architecture is using the local resources, needs and material to build the house, therefore this kind of house reflect the local traditions, history, culture, environment and climate. Due to the climatic zone, the vernacular architecture will use different bioclimatic features and the benefit to using their features are having air ventilation, thermal comfort and suitable lighting in the building.

In the past, aborigines use limestone as the main material to build their house because limestone can be collected at local quarries in Najd. But in recent decades unfired mud-brick and wooden beams were the main building material used in Najd. The craftsman will apply the mud plaster paste to the wall with a wooden scraper and through wooden scraper moves across the wall to leave the parallel pattern. The bottom of the wall is made up with the four or five cut-limestone. Although unfired mud-brick has dominated Najdi architecture, the pillars of the house and mosques are usually built with stone. Because stone last longer and more resistant to corrosion than mud and wooden beams. The interior wall decoration of buildings for the wealth households is very delicate, the wall covered with geometric figures carved with plaster and flowers pressed with molds.

The decorative motifs that were used on traditional building in Arabia were based on the use of mud reliefs. But across the land of Arabia, using color to painting the house only in Asir region. To personalize the residential building, people are encouraged to se the rich natural color pigments and plant colors in their surrounding landscapes in their dwelling units.

=== The impact of climate ===
The area for the modern day of Saudi Arabia can be divided by four distinct regions and due to the unique geographical location of Saudi Arabia, the climate varies from region to region, so the style of architecture in each region is different.

=== Architecture in the Western Region ===
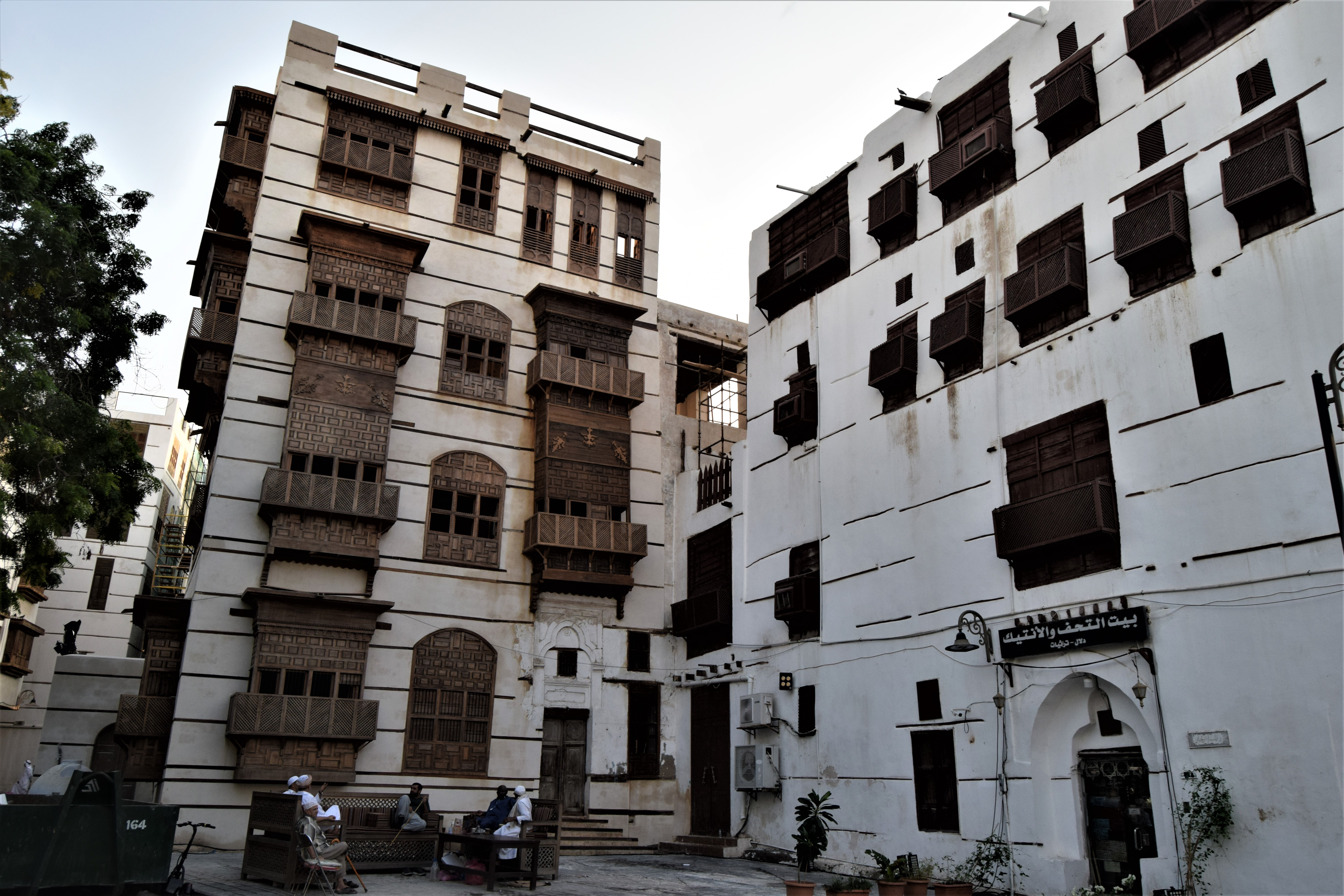
Historical Hejazi-style houses in old Jeddah (Al-Balad)

In the western region, it is a hot-humid climate and located in coastal plain along the Red Sea. The structural skeleton of the house is made up of large coral columns and with wood floors and roofs. In ground floor is general sitting room and the more private sitting room is located in the first floor. The sleeping room is generally located on the upper floor and in summer are sleep on the roof so that there is better ventilation in the sea breeze and natural winds.

==== Mashrabiya ====
Mashrabiya is a traditional element widely used in Saudi Arabia's architecture comprising wooden screens built on the face of a building like a wooden bay window. The function of mashrabiya is to provide a private place and suppresses the strong desert sunlight to keep the room cool. The working principle is with the evaporation of water on the surface of porous pots can be cooled the internal water to provide stable natural ventilation through the shade and open lattice. Therefore, it can be used as a window, curtain, air conditioner and refrigerator at the same time. Mashrabiyas are also introduced used in mosques to suppress sunlight and therefore keep the room cool for prayer and meditation.

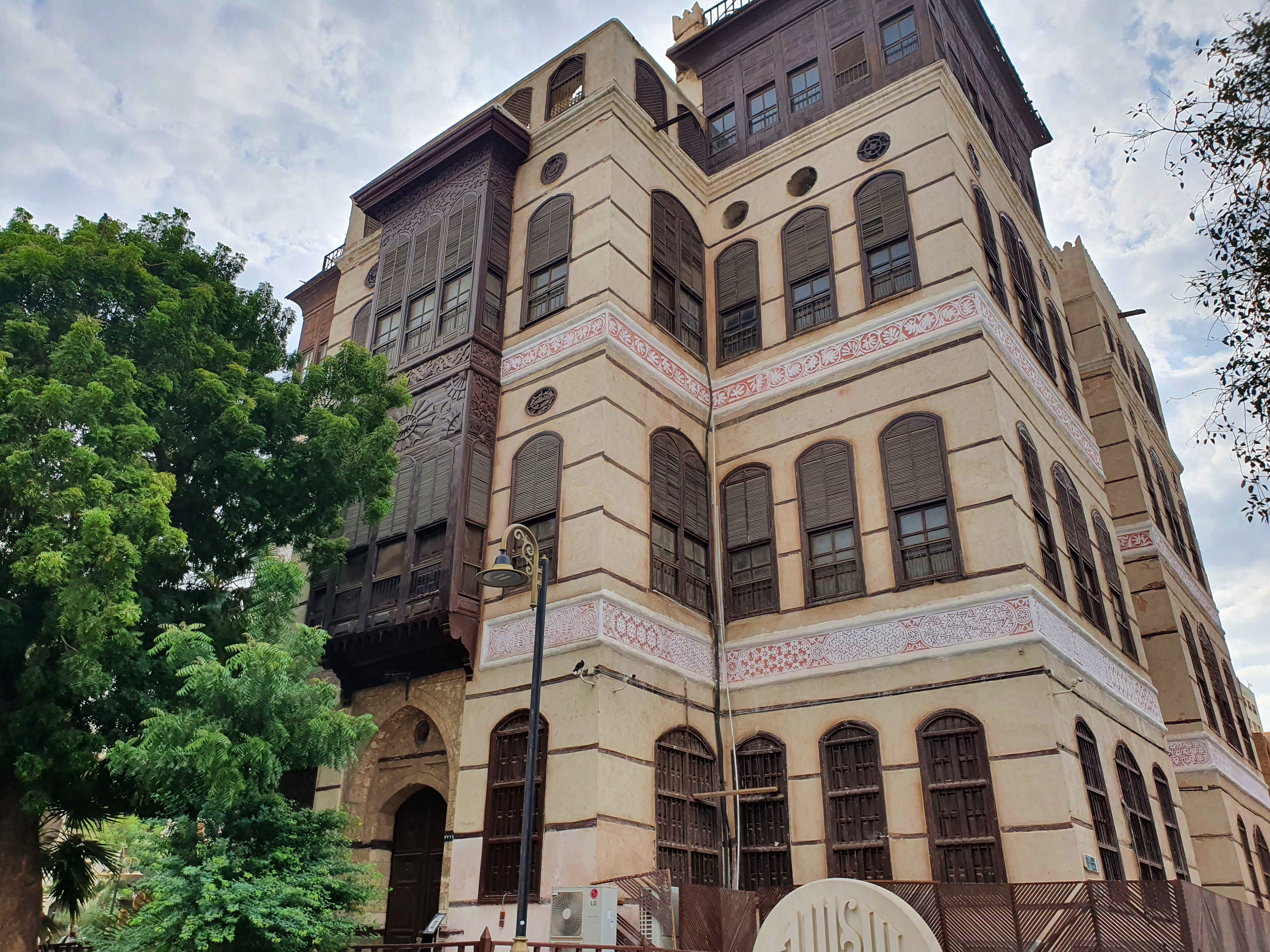
Nasseef House in Jeddah

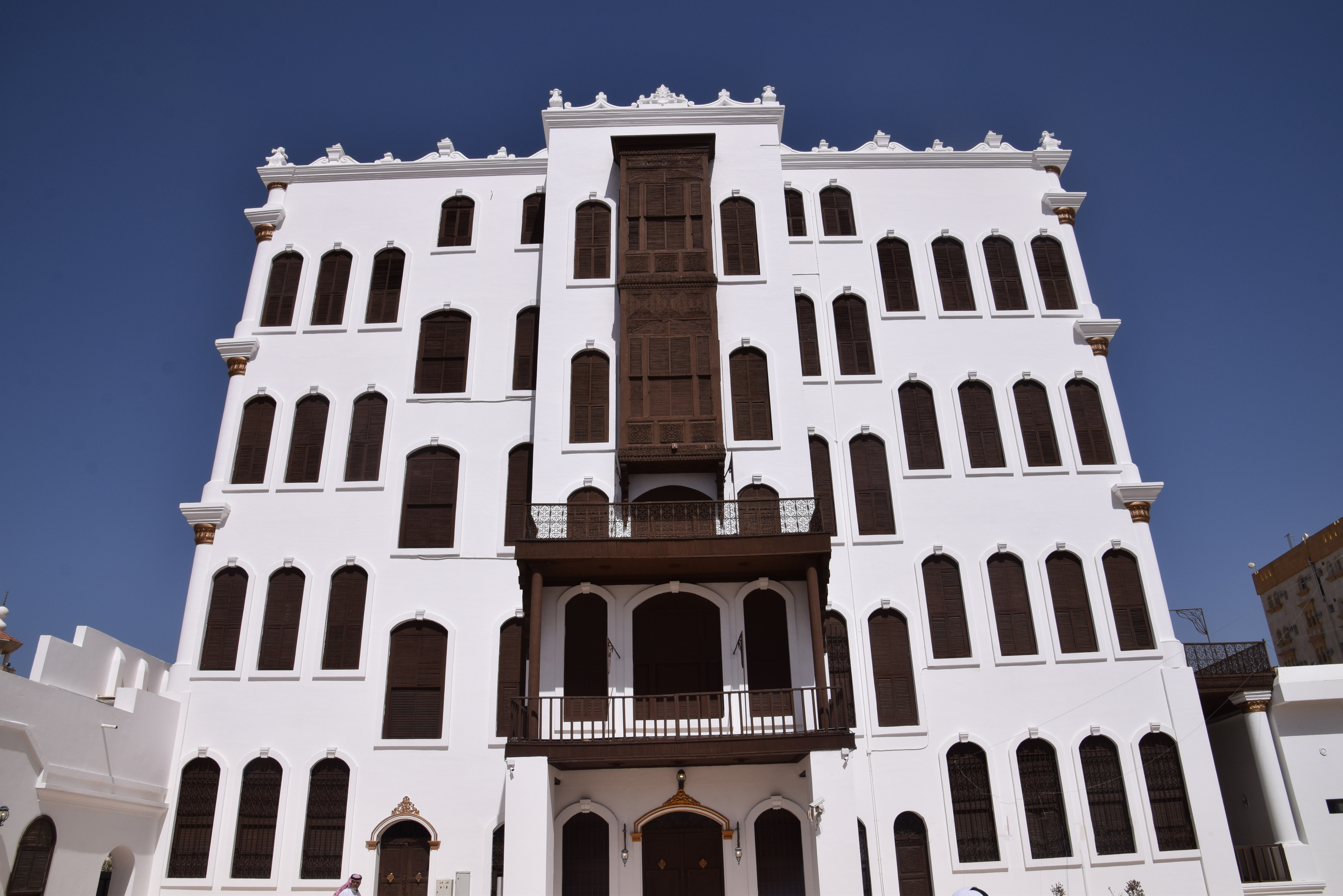
Shubra Palace in Taif

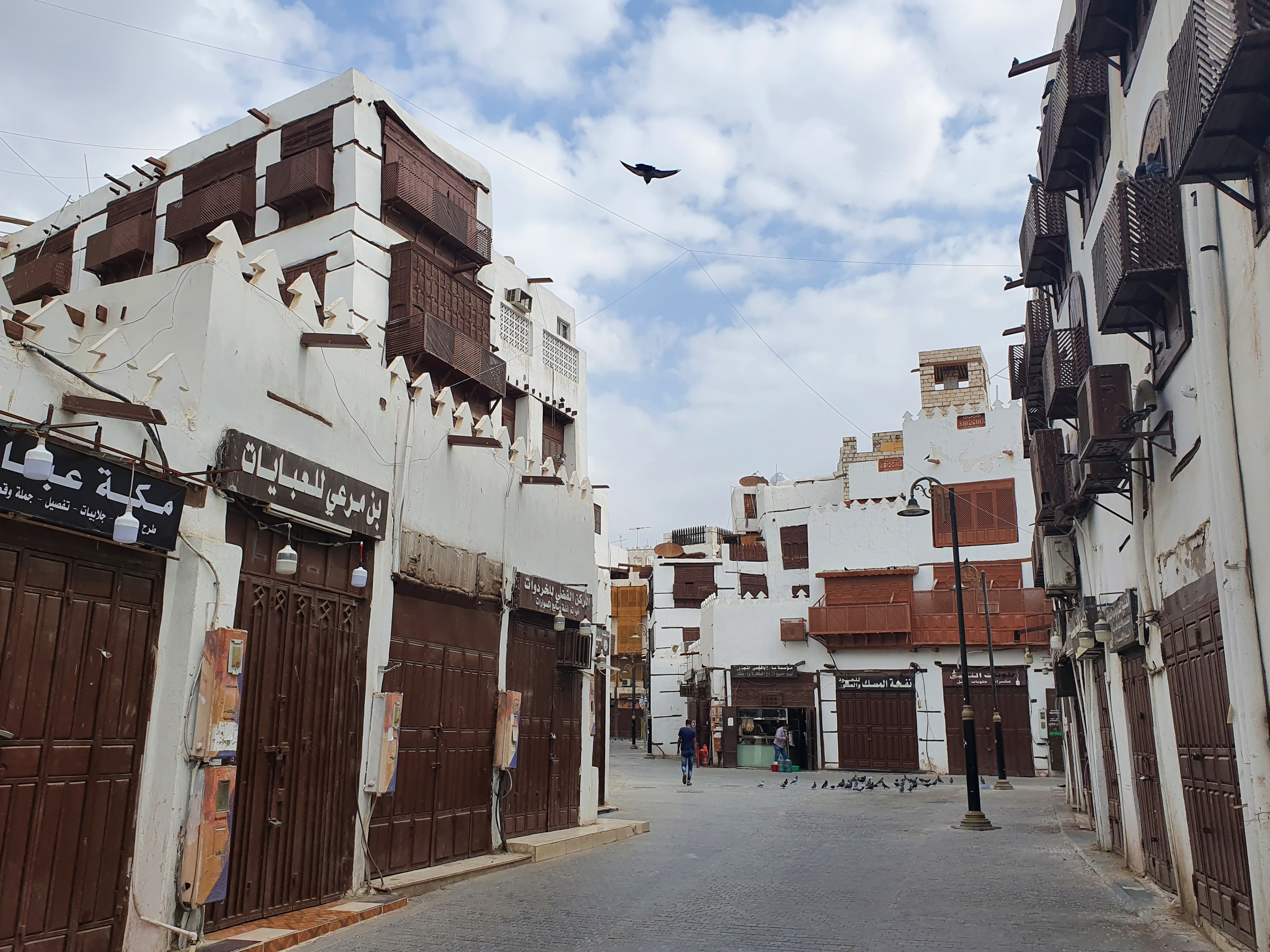
Market Street in Old Jeddah

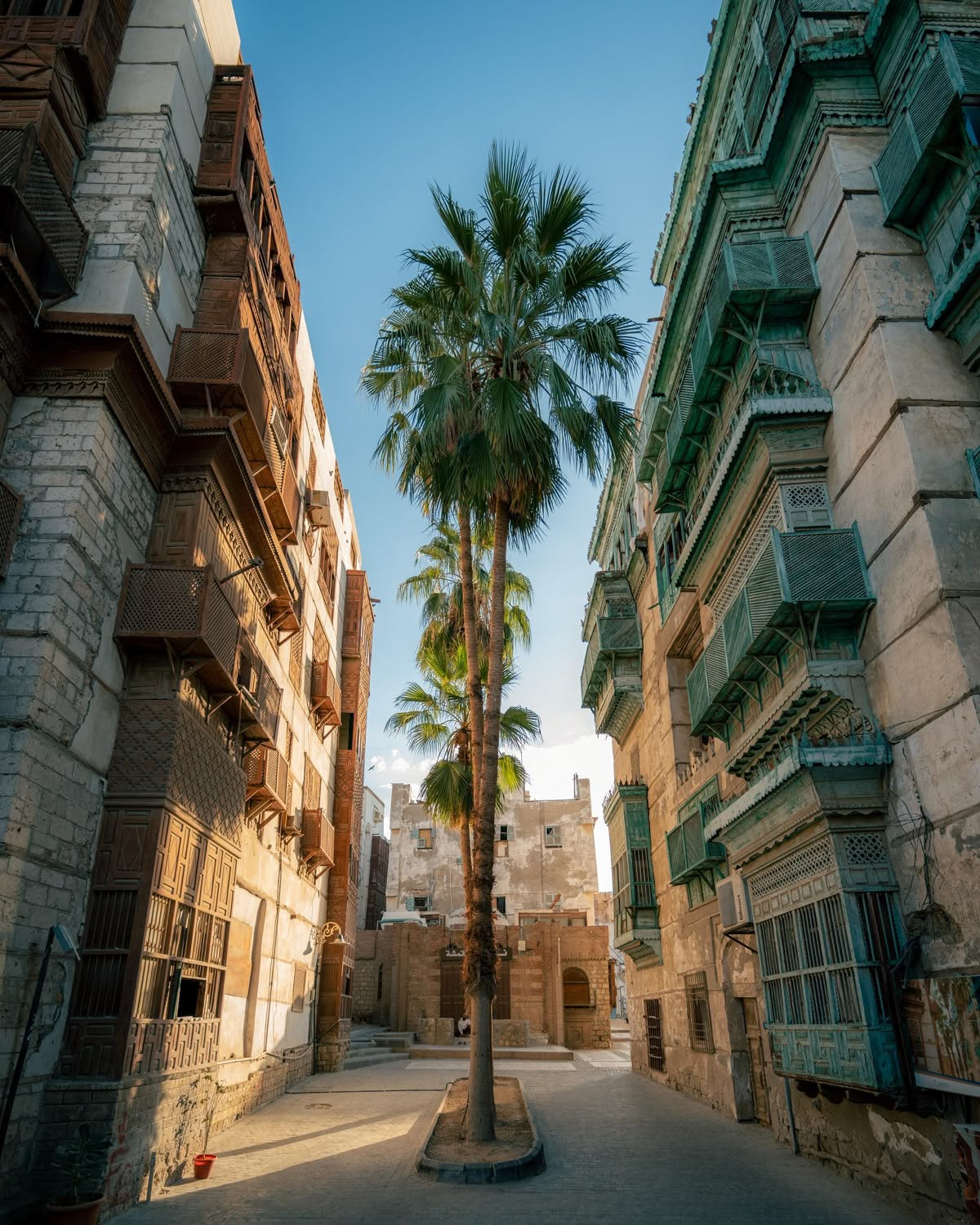
Old city of Jeddah

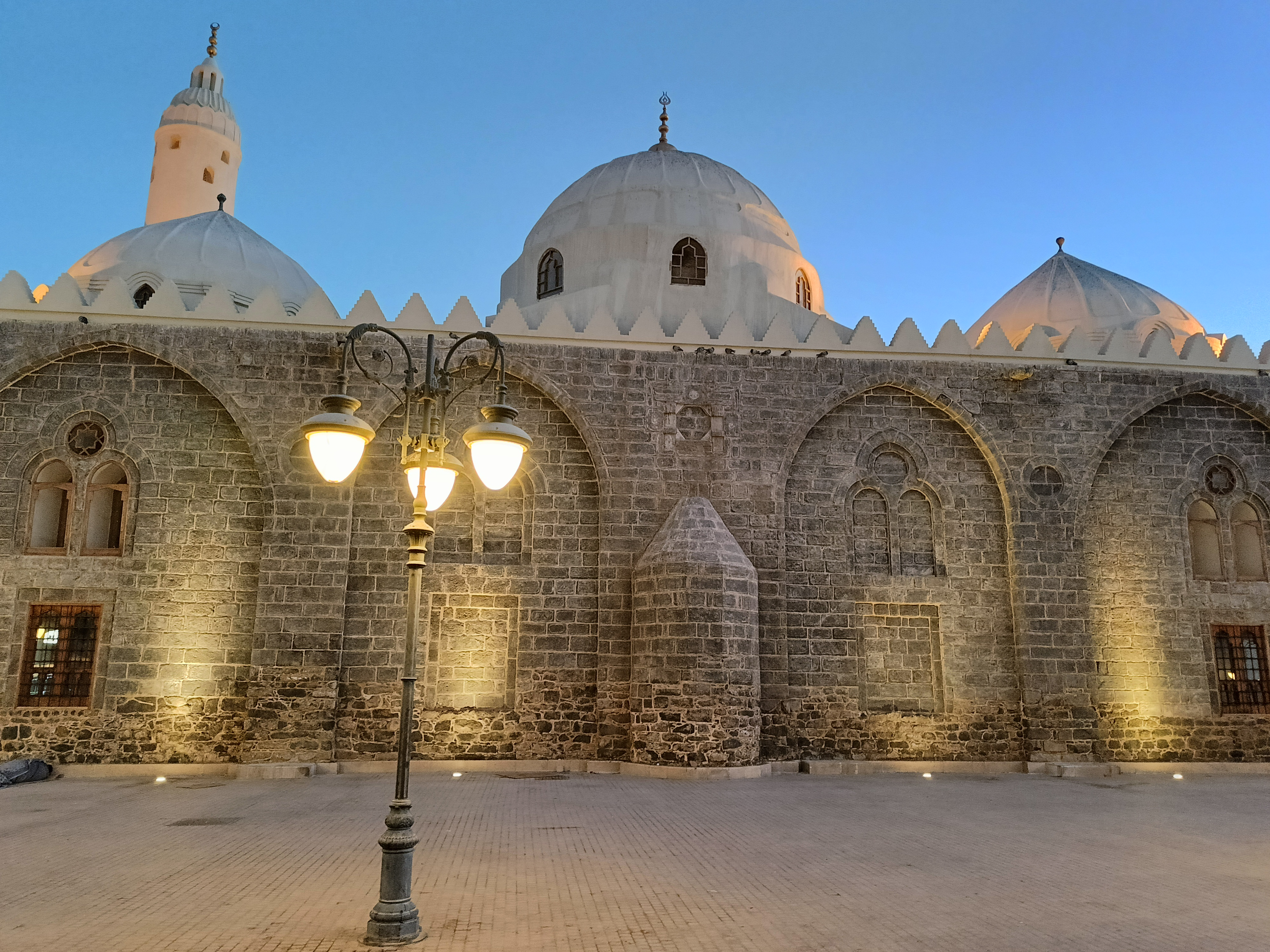
Mosque of Al-Ghamama in Medina

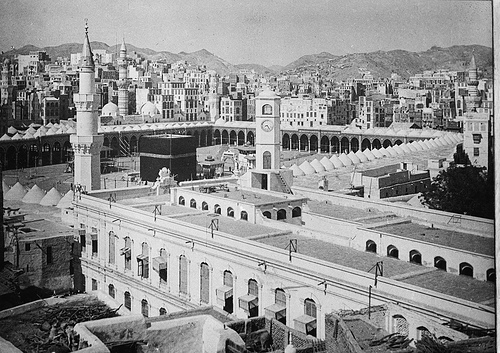
The Grand Mosque (Masjid al-Haram) Prior to Its Expansion, with Traditional Hejazi Houses in Mecca (c. 1910)

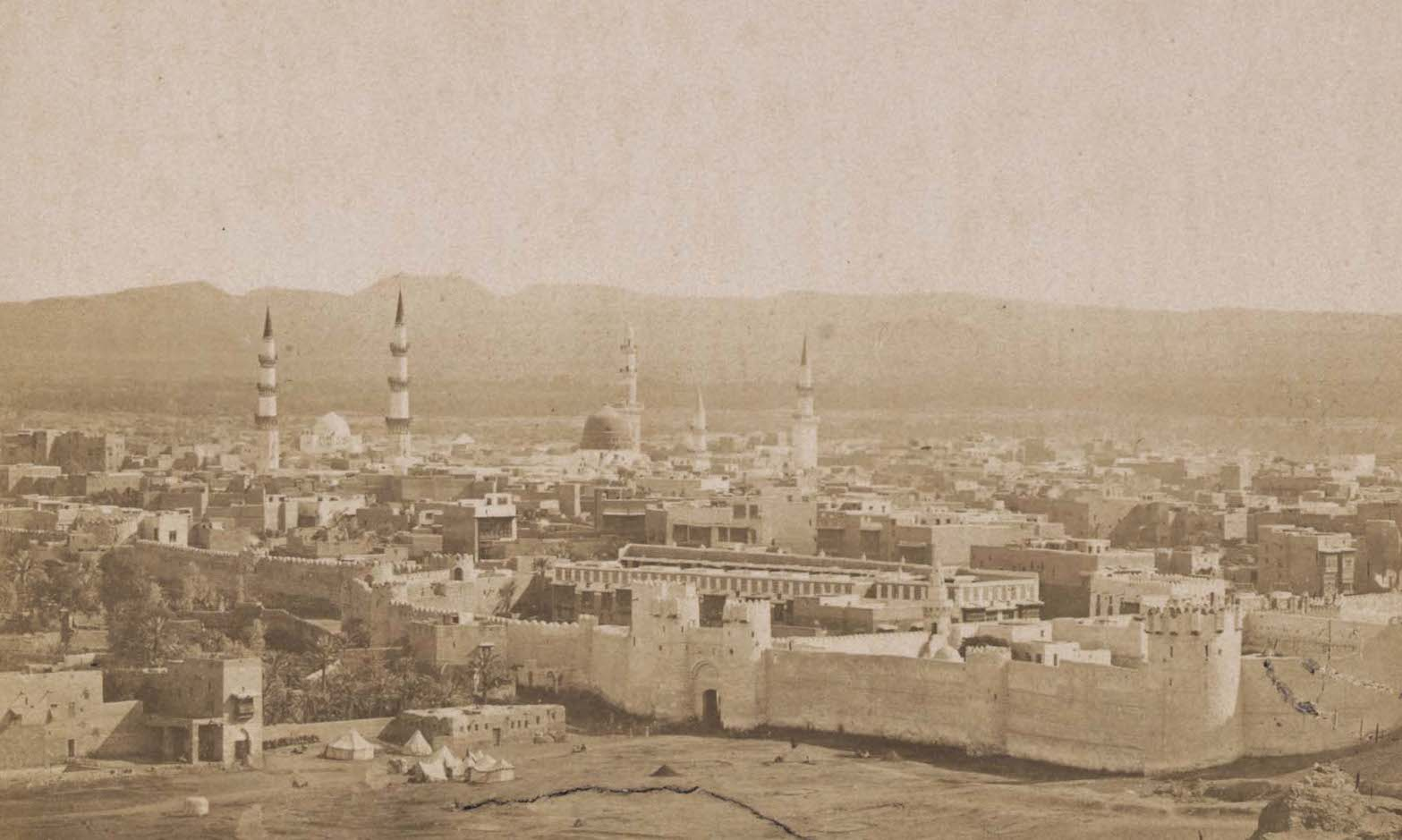
The city of Medina in 1880

=== Architecture in the Central and Northern Region ===
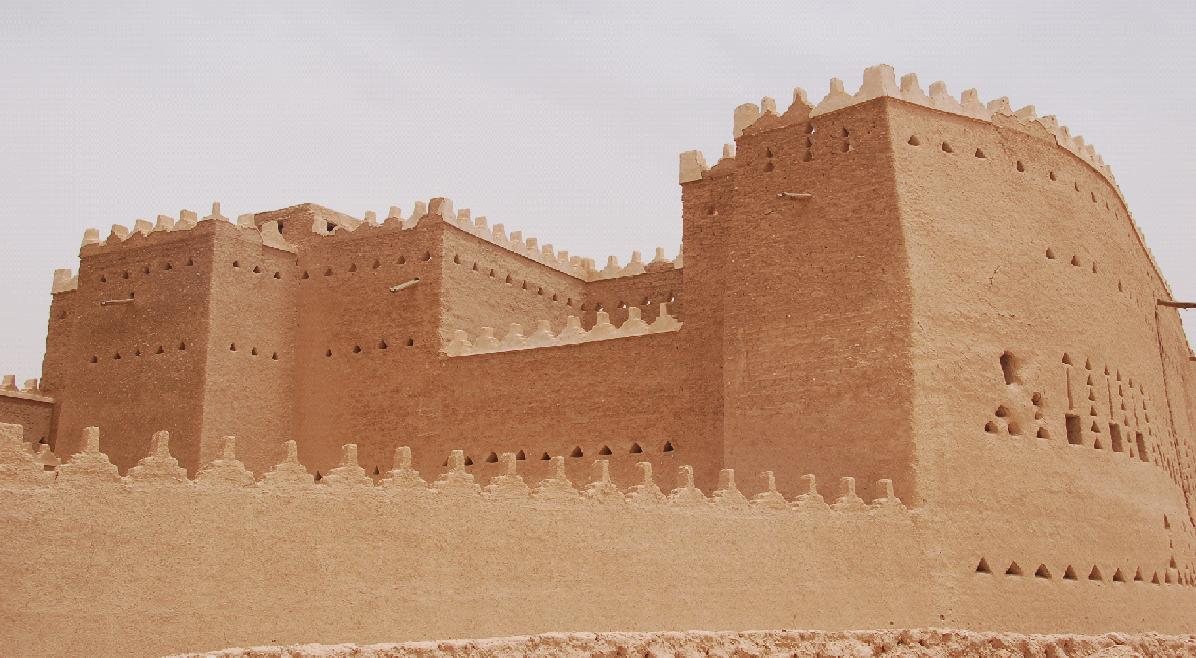
Sa'ad ibn Saud Palace in Turaif district, Diriyah

In the central and northern, it is a desert climate, therefore, the weather is hot and dry and has a great temperature difference between day and night. The typical houses in the Najd region are usually two stories high and built around an open central courtyard. The shape of the courtyard is usually geometric like a rectangle or a square and it works as lungs of the houses to regulate the microclimate and provide a private space for the family to maintain the private life. The houses are built on either side of the narrow streets, providing a shady place for pedestrians. The roof level of the house is used for sleeping in summer. The main material to build this kind of house is sun-dried mud bricks and mud. The mud is worked as plastering material used to smear interior and exterior walls, it is very suitable for the sandy weather because the colour is unaffected by the weather. The exterior walls are thick which are about 80–100 cm, thus, it can effectively isolate high temperate and create comfort level to the residents.

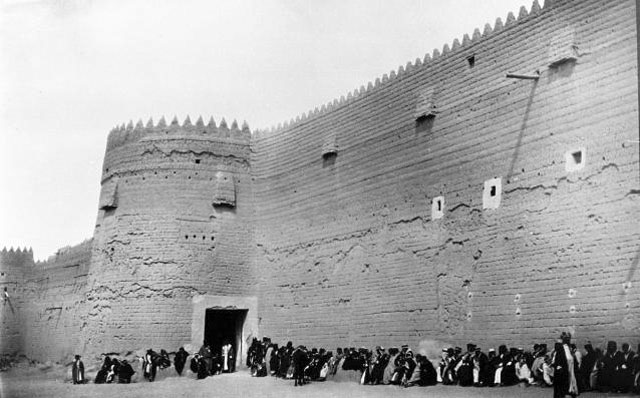
Barzan Palace in Ha'il (now destroyed)

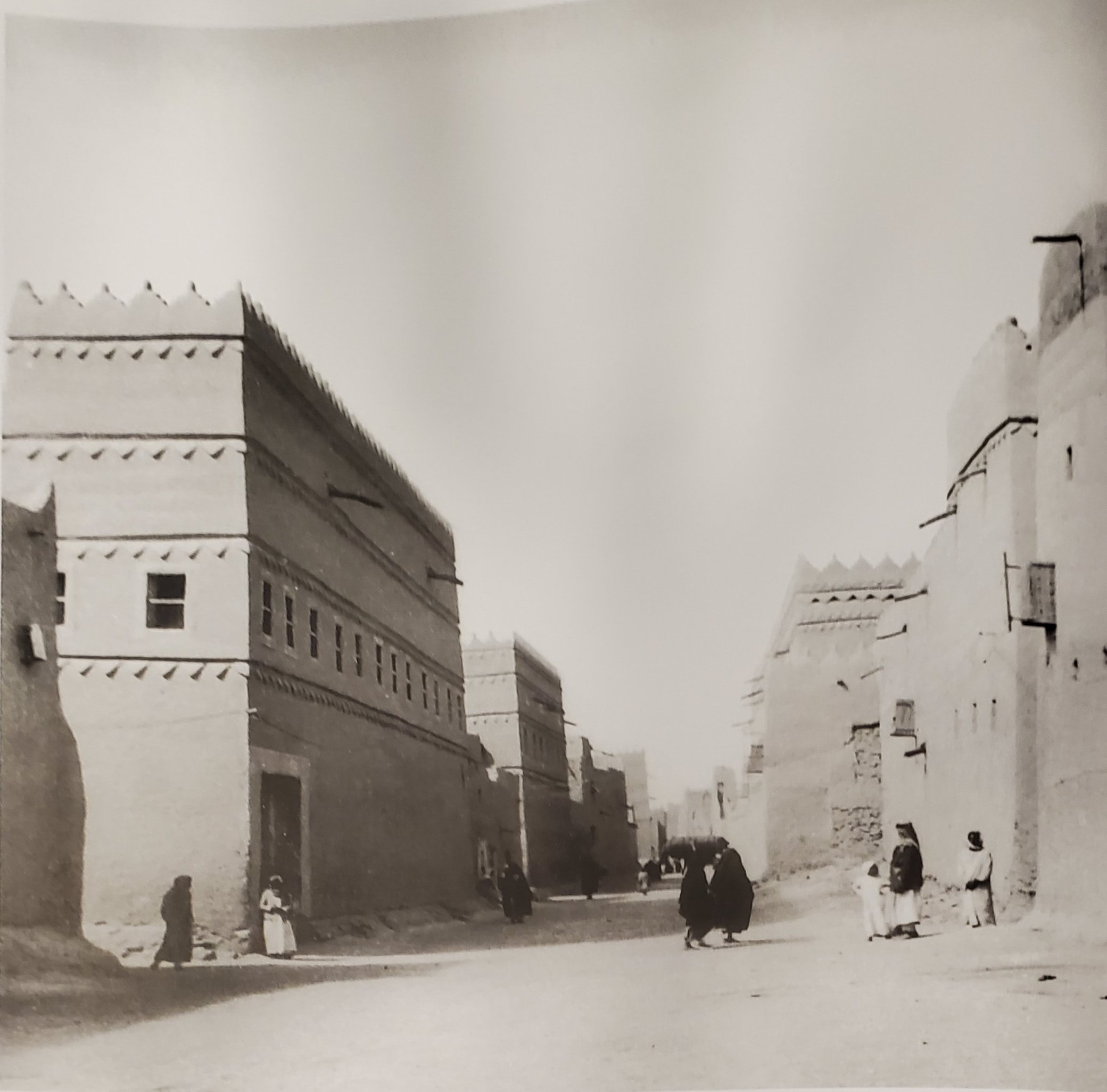
Historical Thumairi Street in Riyadh

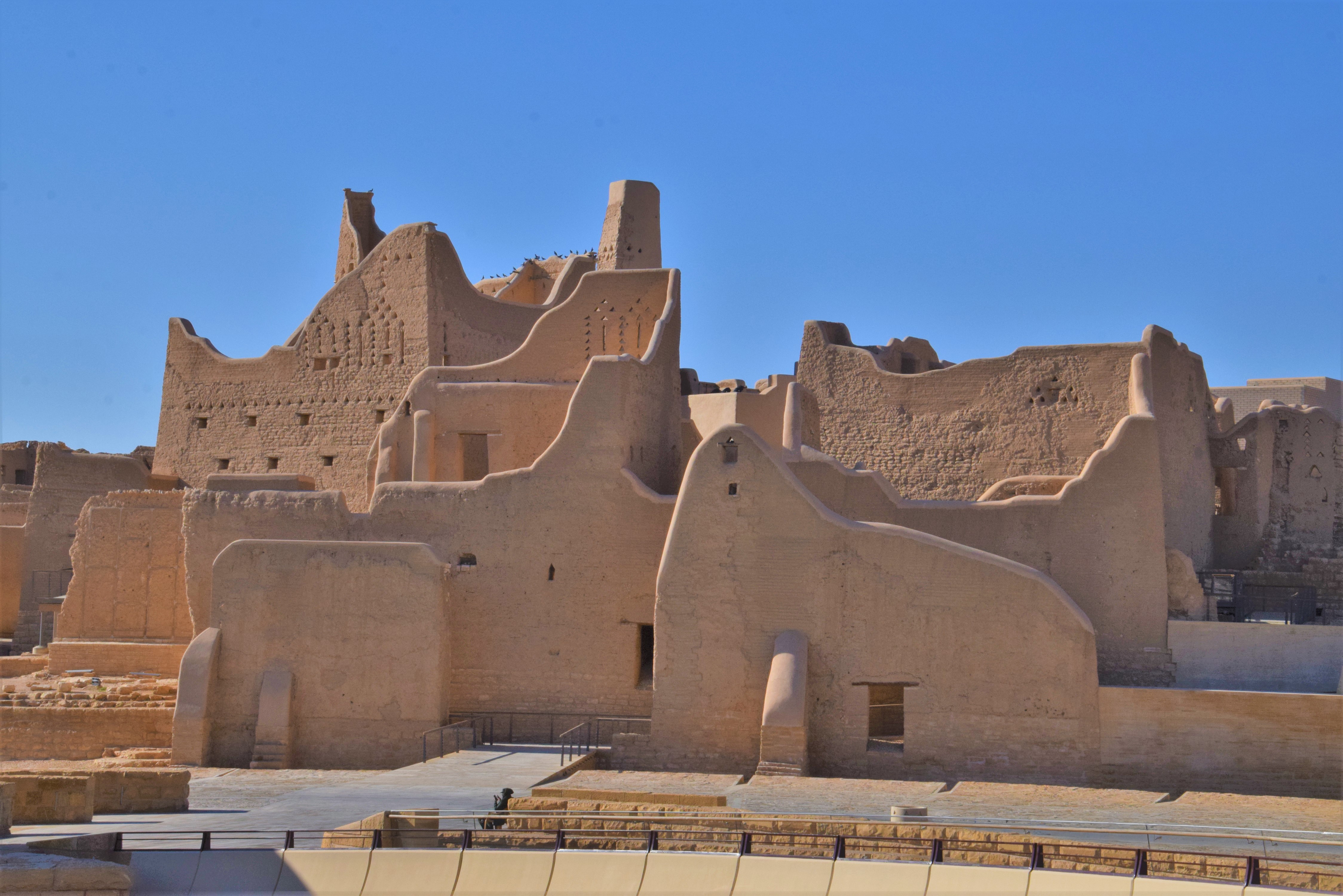
remains of Salwa Palace in Riyadh

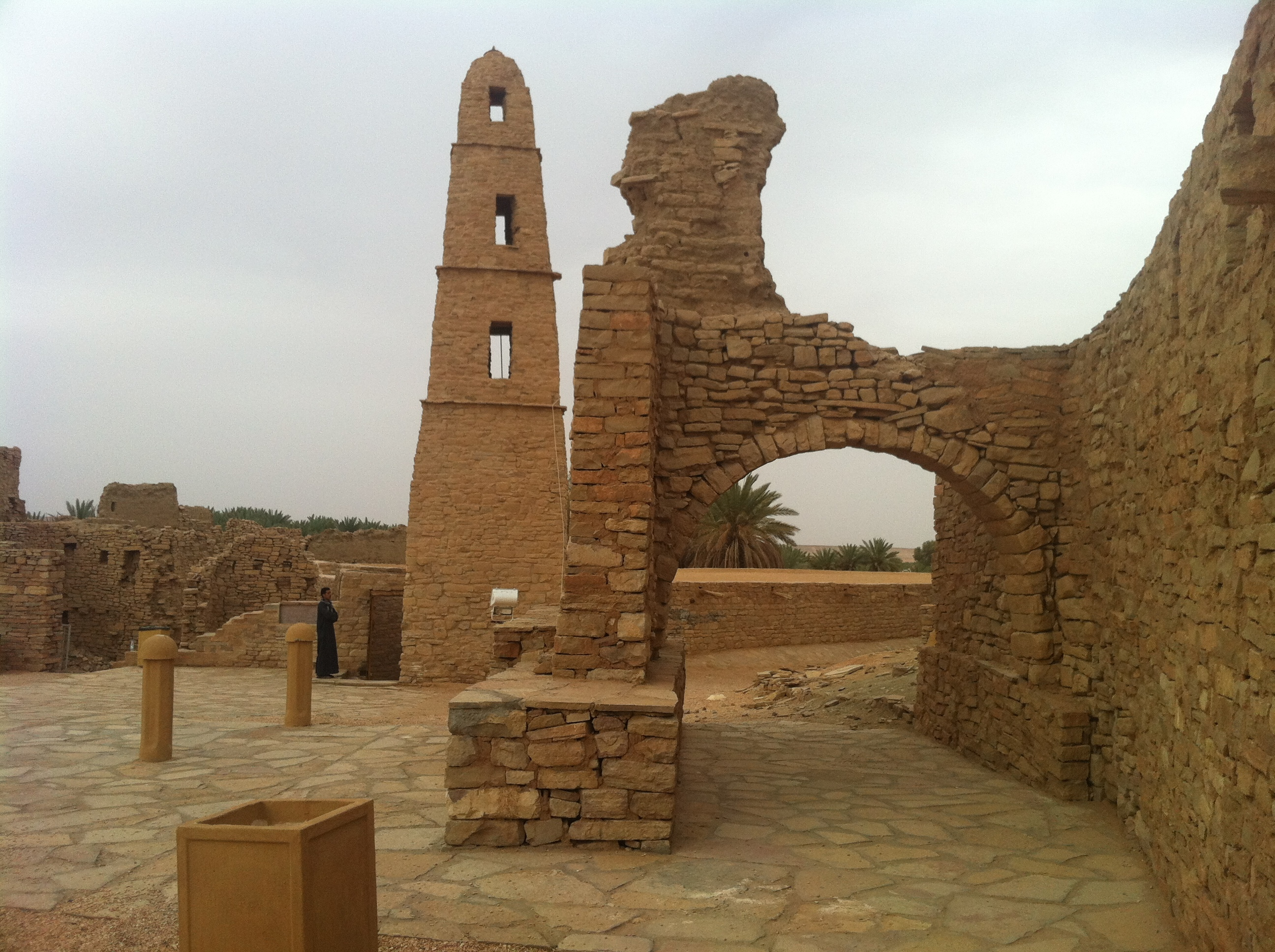
Umar ibn al-Khattab Mosque in Dumat Al-Jandal

=== Architecture in the Eastern Region ===
In the eastern region, it is a hot humid region along the Persian Gulf. It has the extreme weather which means in summer months it is hot and dry and has a high rate of humidity temperature day and night.

The traditional house in this region has a courtyard style and the arcade balcony around the house. Due to the harsh climate, the height of the typical house in the eastern region is one to three stories high and the building is very compact, resulting in a narrow passages between houses. The wall of this type of houses is thicker than other types which have better heat resistant and has the effect of insulating. The way to create natural ventilation by installation wind catchers.

==== Jawatha Mosque ====
Jawatha Mosque is the oldest in the Hajar region. It is the first mosque which held Friday prayer next to the prophet's mosque in Al-Madina. Jawatha Mosque can be considered as architecture heritage which is one of the main constituents of national identity. It is built on a high land and some of the walls are built of stone. The Jawatha Mosque can hold approximately 130 people to pray together during prayers at a same time. The indoor prayer space is divided by three main gallery spaces and there are two entrances can go to the main prayer, one from the west side and the other is from the east side.

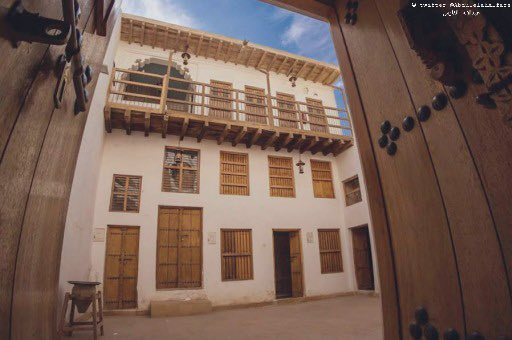
Historical house in Kūt district, Hofuf, Al-Ahsa

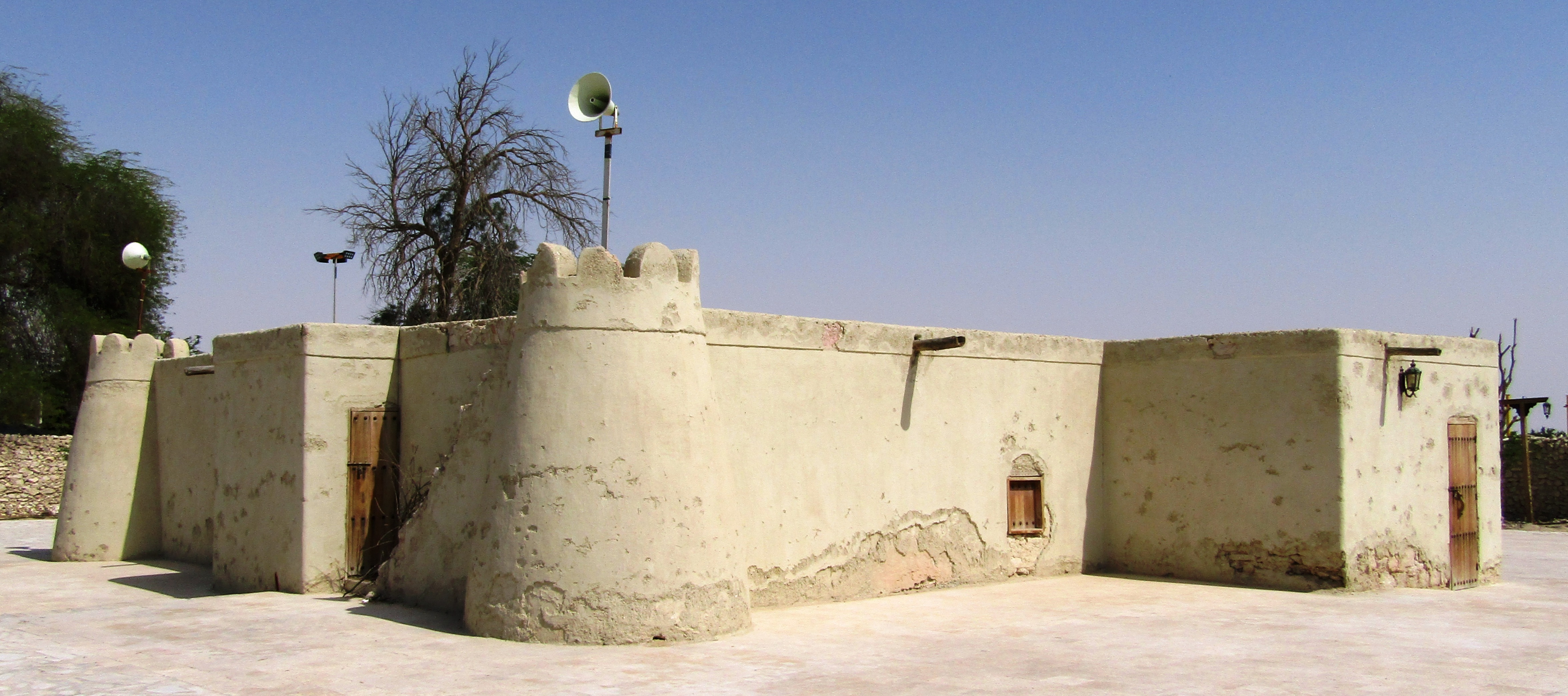
Jawatha Mosque

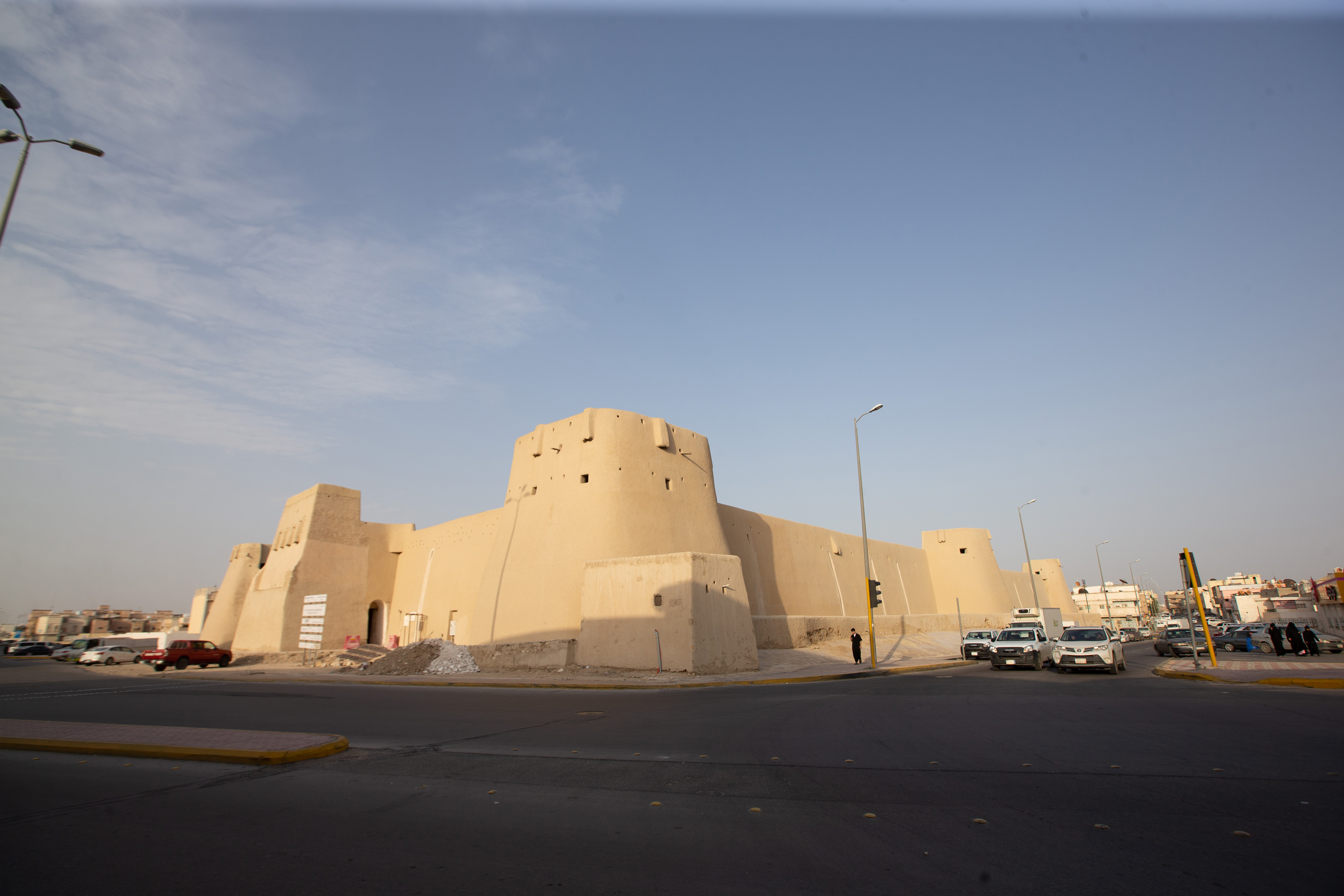
Sahood Palace

=== Asir region ===
The Asir region, it is a high mountains province to the southwest side and it has the Mediterranean climates which characteristics are dry summers and rainy winter.

The Asir houses are commonly built on the high mountains province due to its geographical location. Climatic conditions promoted the emergence of architectural society. The building normally makes up by one ground and two upper floors which can provide shelter for man and tamed animals. The main sitting room is on the first floor, while the top floor is the kitchen and bedroom, at the same time the open terrace is also added to the upper floor for wash purpose. In each house there is at least one room used for male reception, which separates from female quarters and family living rooms. The staircase occupies the middle of the house and material of the staircase is mud and use wooden beams to sustained.

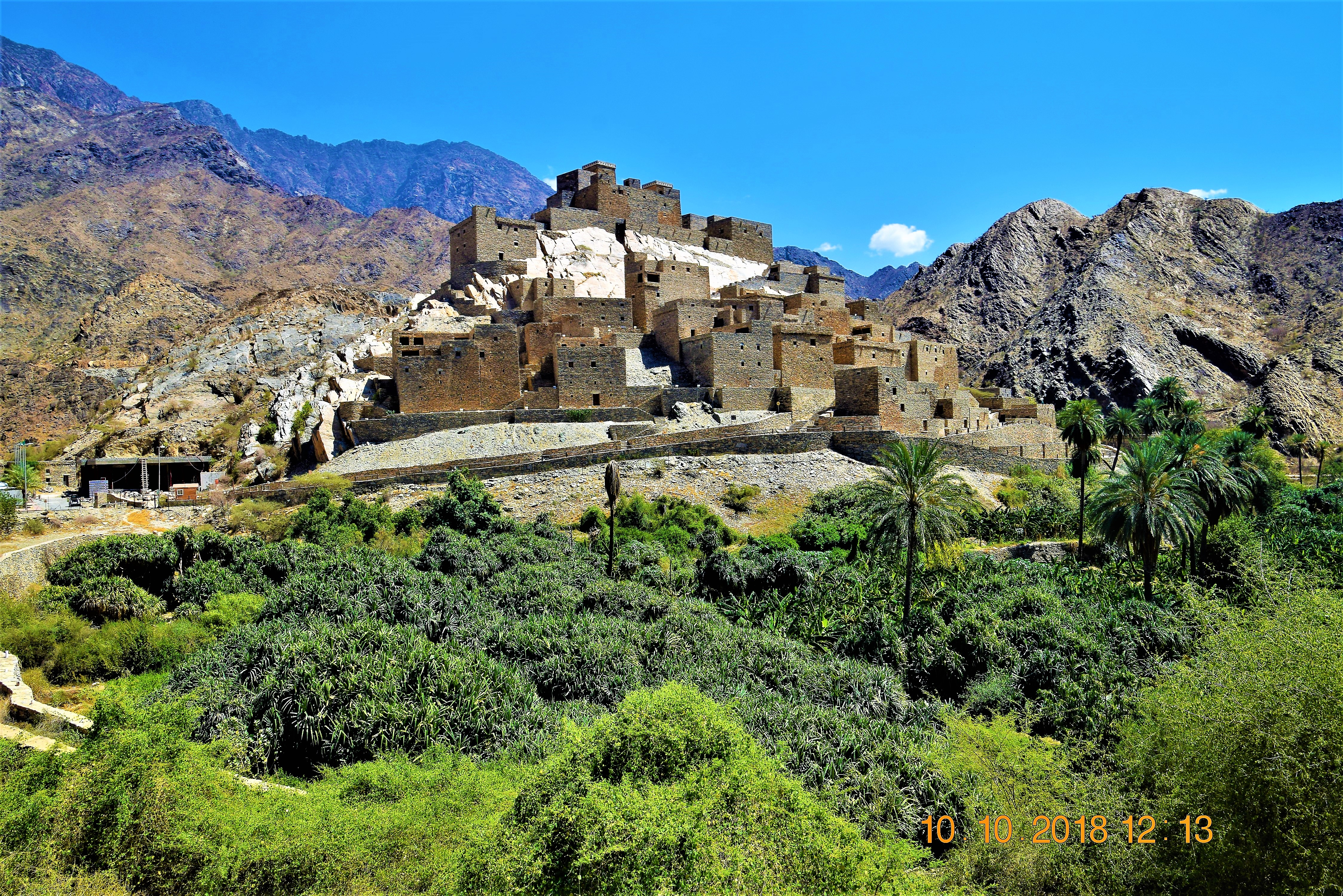
Thee Ain village

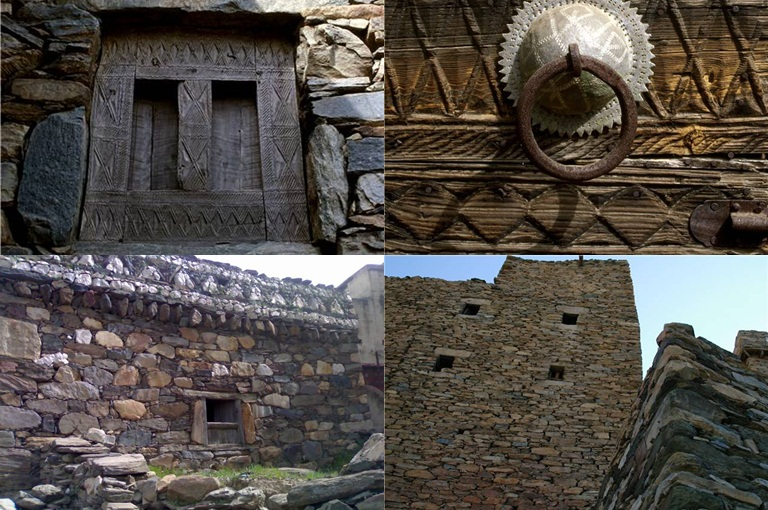
elements of a traditional house in Al-Baha

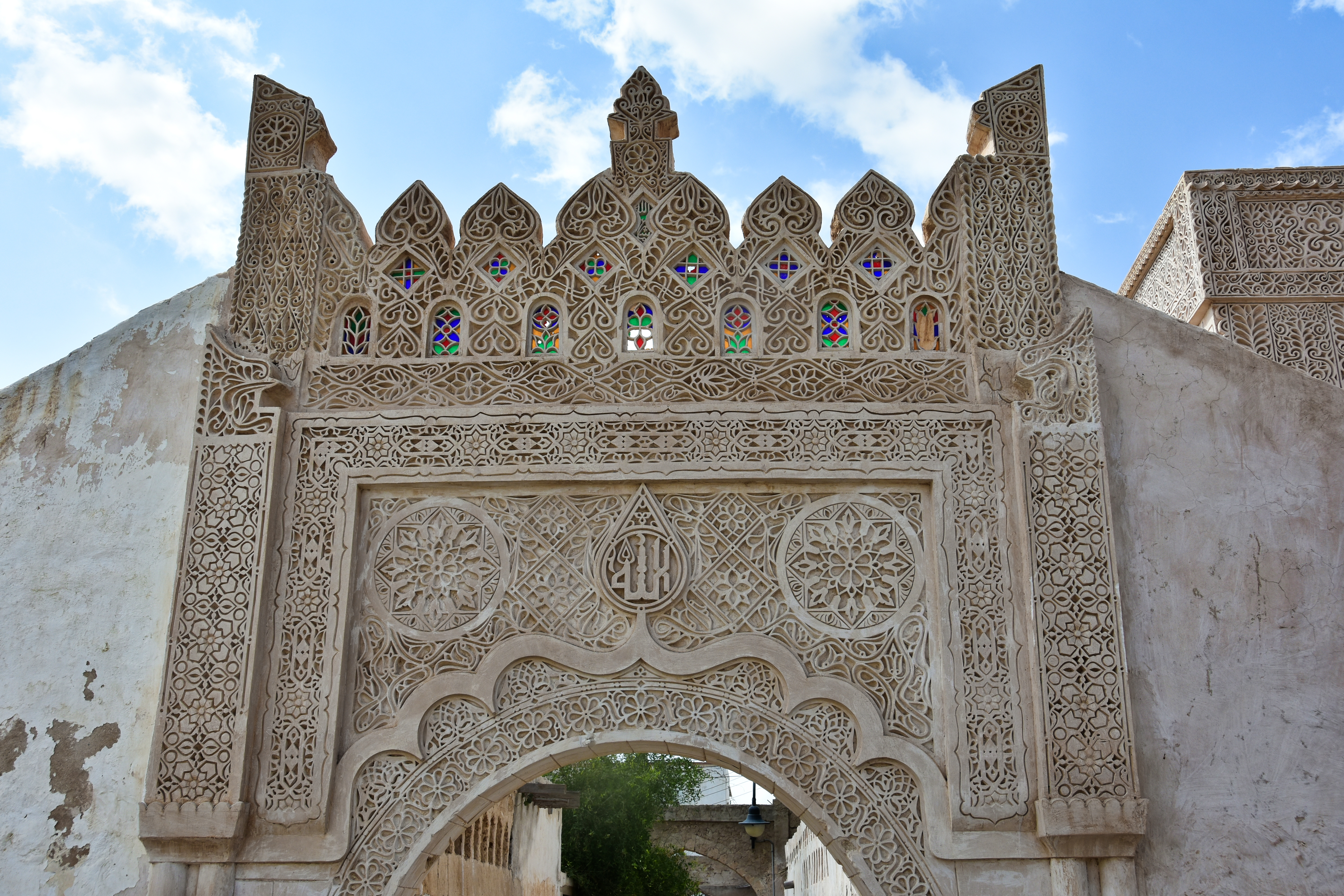
Al-Rifai House details

== Evolution of Architecture in the Modern Era ==
The period between the discovery of oil in 1352 AH/1933 AD and the peak of the oil boom in 1393 AH/1973 AD served as a historic turning point in Saudi Arabia's architectural identity, transforming it from a resource-scarce country dependent on limited agriculture and herding livestock to a manufacturing nation.

Economic growth accelerated once crude oil production began on a commercial basis after the end of World War 2. One of the biggest urban impacts of this economic transformation was the emergence of modern cities, which coincided with the first waves of urban migration from within and beyond Saudi Arabia to major metropolises and oil manufacturing hubs in Dhahran, Khobar, and Dammam in search of better employment and business opportunities. The exponential rise in population called for the launch of the first urban planning process in the Kingdom, which took place with the modernization of Khobar's master plan in 1366 AH/1947 AD, incorporating a completely modern urban style based on road networks and transportation systems. The plan was also based on implementing global urban standards, which served as the first model for town planning in the Kingdom and were a critical factor in defining modern architecture in these cities.

These standards were adopted across Khobar and included setting road dimensions, land use planning, and determining the size of residential colonies and building heights. The introduction of automation into construction played a big role in optimizing the entire industry after it had previously depended on manual work. The establishment of power plants enabled the introduction of machinery that could produce building materials locally, such as concrete and cement bricks. Its spread also helped usher in a modern architectural identity that completely replaced traditional architecture.

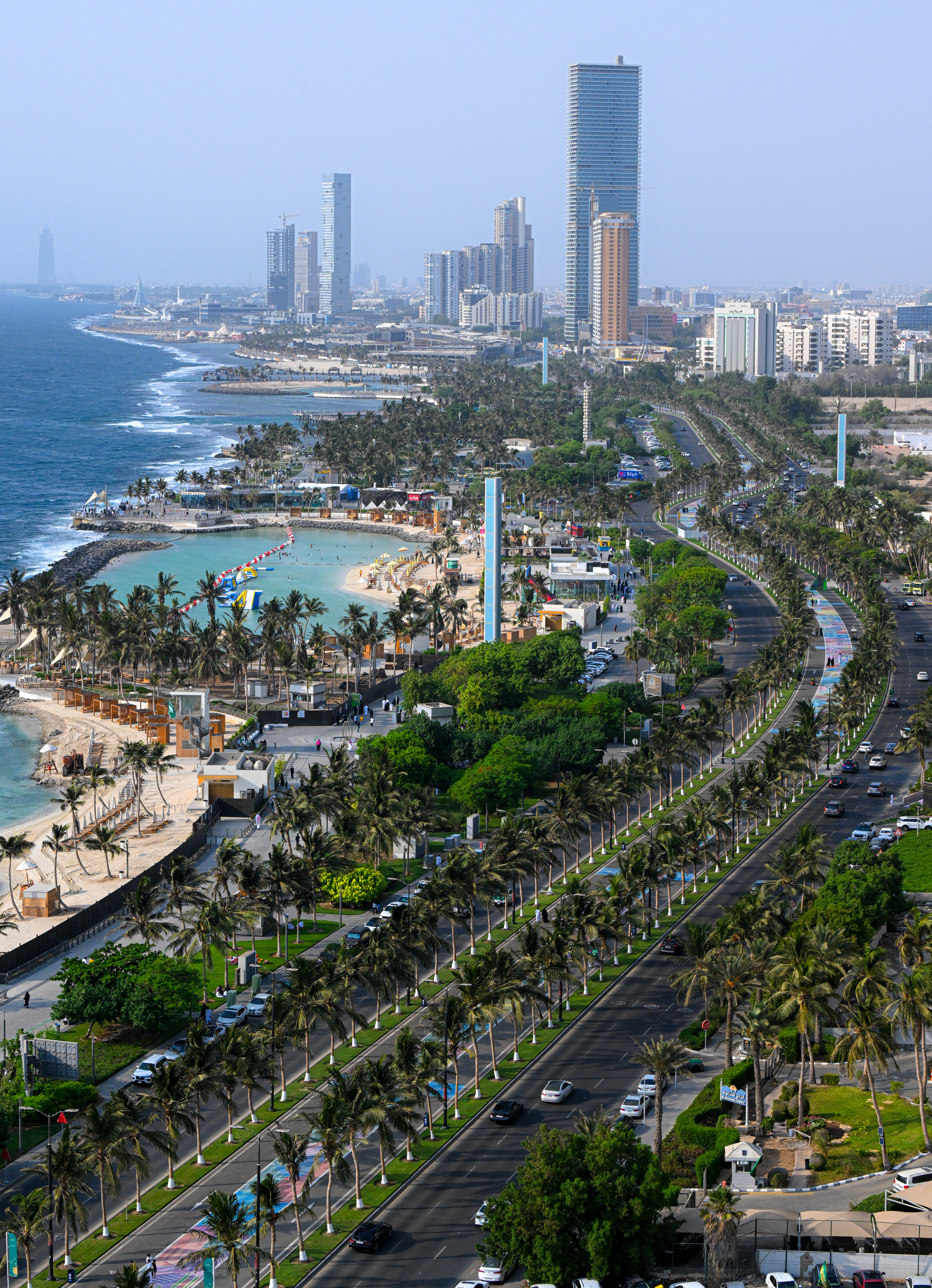
Jeddah's beachfront

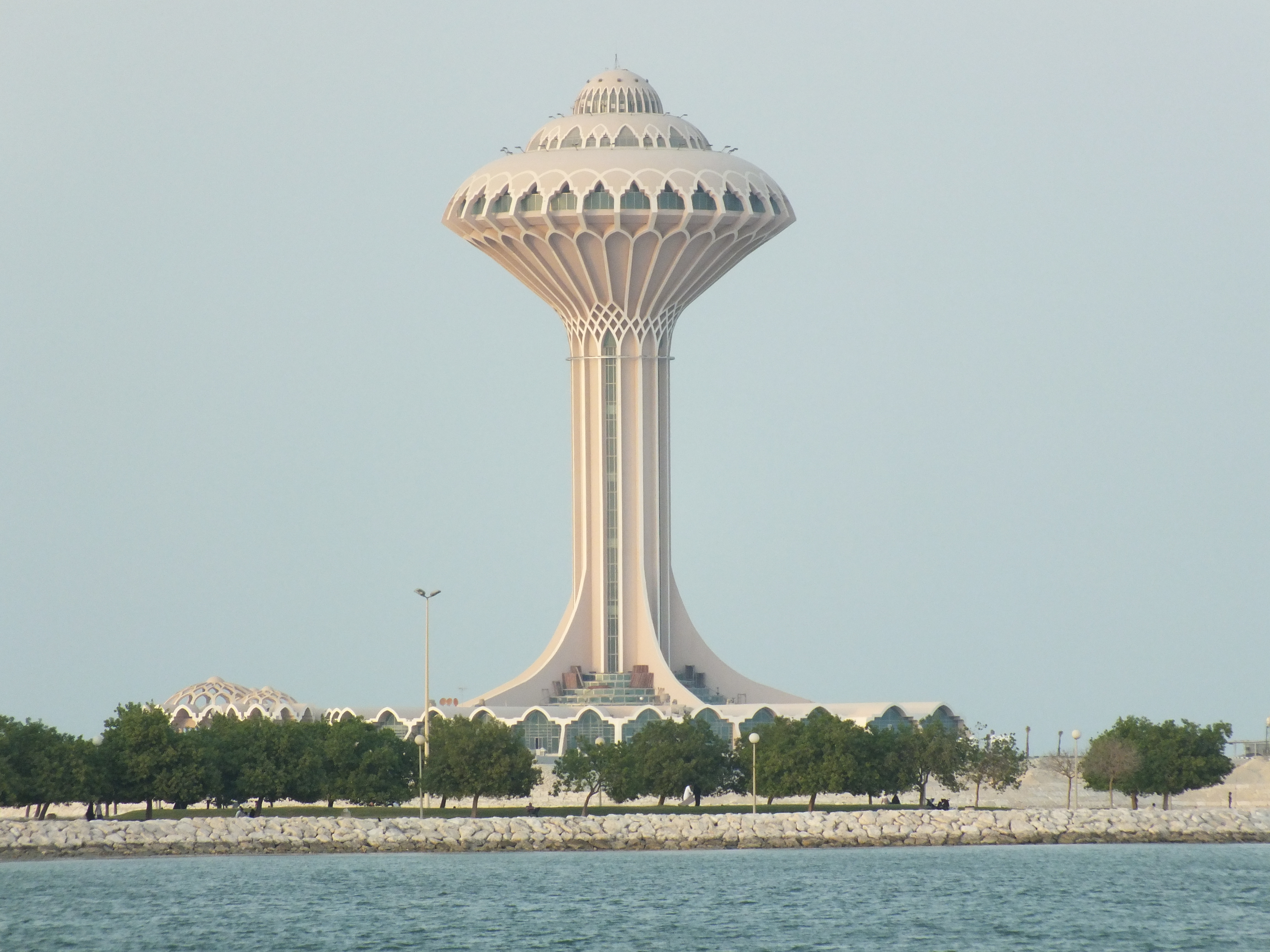
Khobar Water Tower

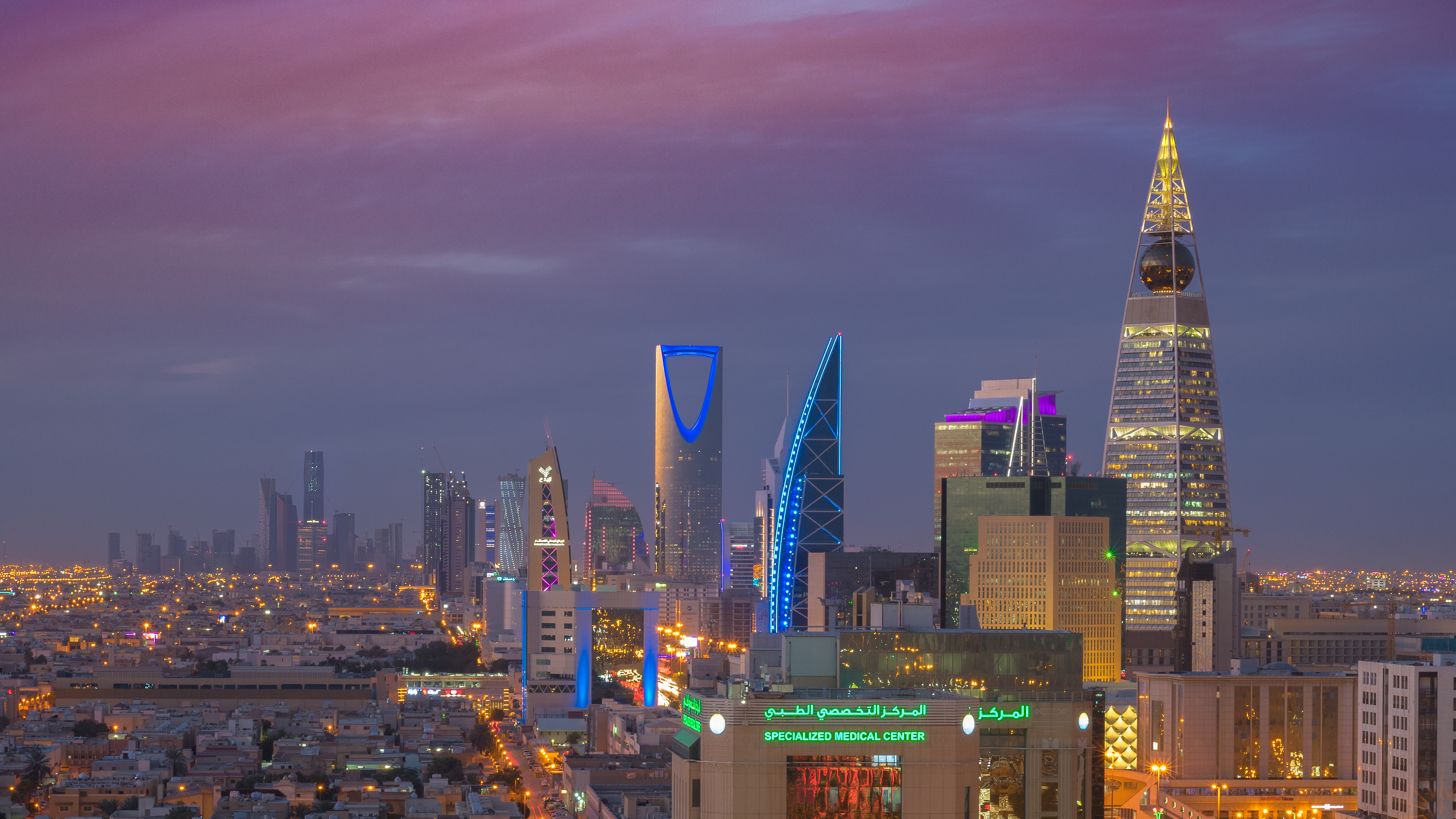
Skyline of Riyadh including its financial district in the background

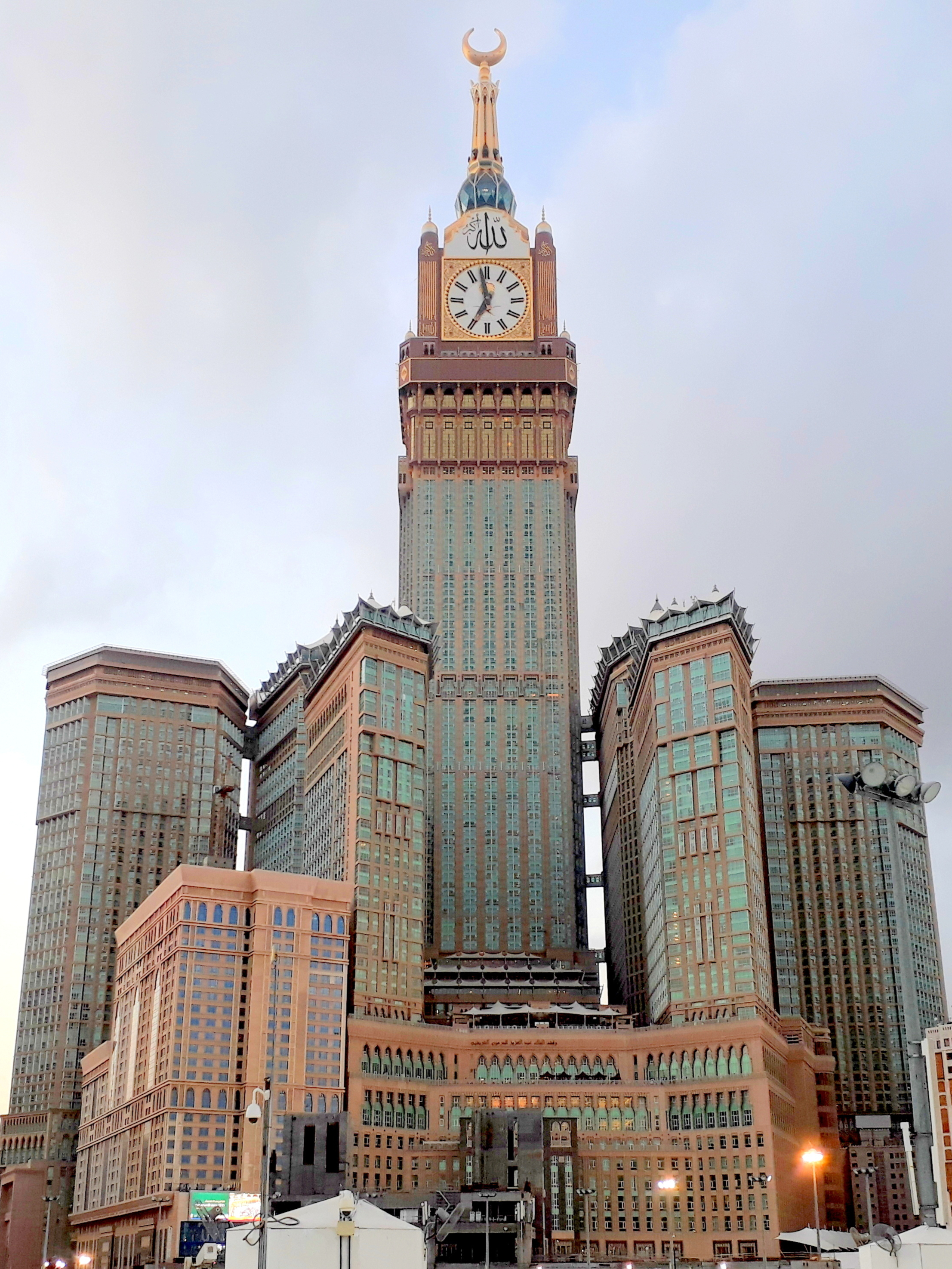
The Clock Towers in Mecca

== Postmodern architecture ==
Postmodern architecture was an international style in late 1970s which influenced contemporary architecture. The postmodern style can be defined as sensual, surprised and humorous. Postmodern architecture in Saudi Arabia is considered to be the most popular because it is used in all parts of the country. This architectural style was previously unknown in Saudi Arabia because it was imported from abroad, but was widely accepted and immediately prevailed as it has responded to some social-cultural and environmental factors very much valued in Saudi Arabia.

=== National Commercial Bank ===
The National Commercial Bank located in Jeddah, designed by Gordon Bunshaft of Skidmore Owings and Merrill (SOM), was built in 1983 with a 27-story and set in a 1.2-hectare plaza on the edge of the sea. The 27-story building has a triangular appearance with helical parking on either side. The design concept of this building not only represents a complete transformation of architectural philosophy, but also represents a fundamental transformation of modern architecture, away from universality and from asymmetry to regionalized modernism. There are three triangular courts vertically through the building's façade and this can provide the ventilation and heats, two of the courtyard are seven-floor and the third one is nine-story. The stacked courtyard is combined with a windowless exterior to avoid direct sunlight. At the same time, diffuse sunlight is allowed to shine into the interior of the building and each v-shaped floor is unaffected by direct sunlight and wind. This form conforms to two characteristics of traditional Islamic architecture, natural ventilation and inward orientation.

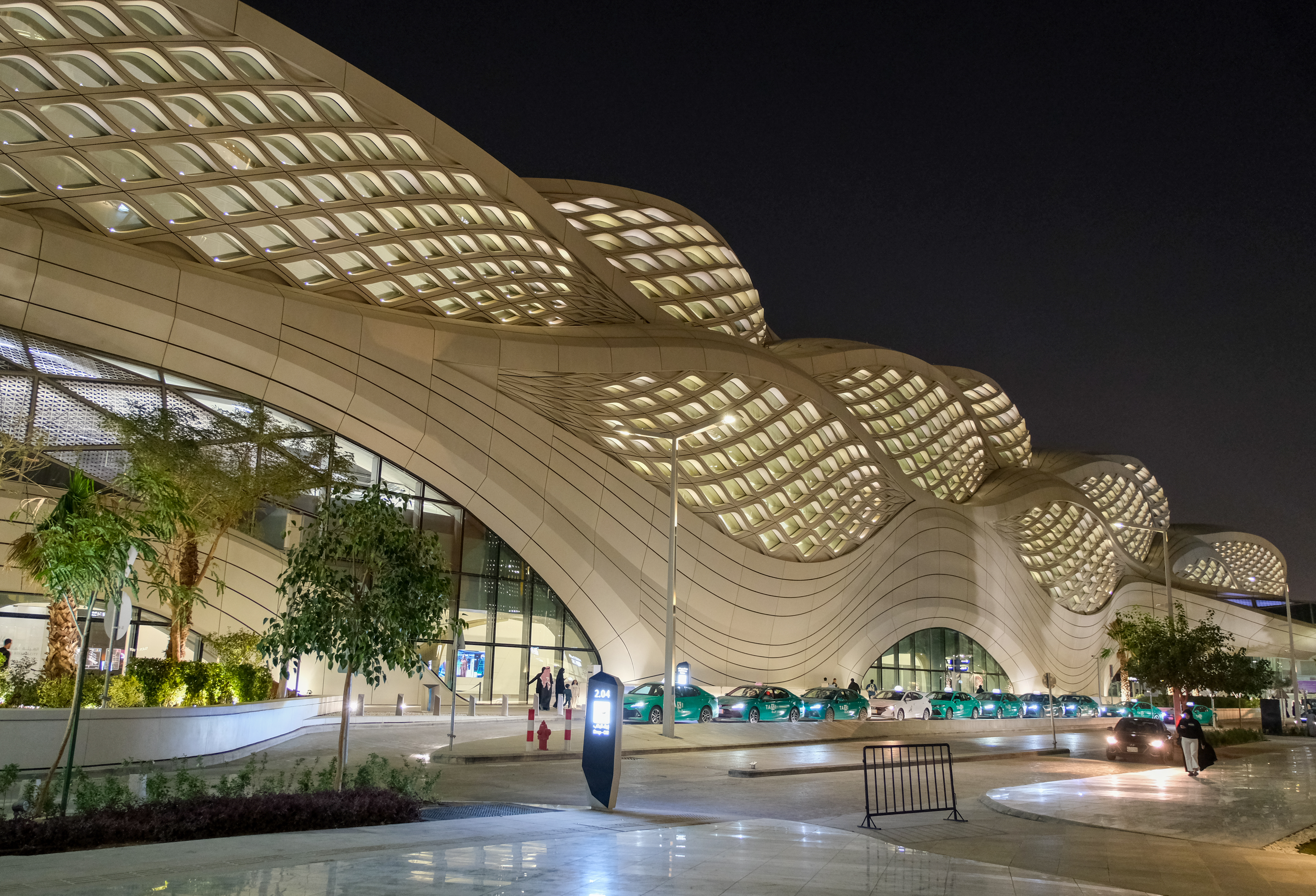
Riyadh Financial District (KAFD) Metro Station in Riyadh

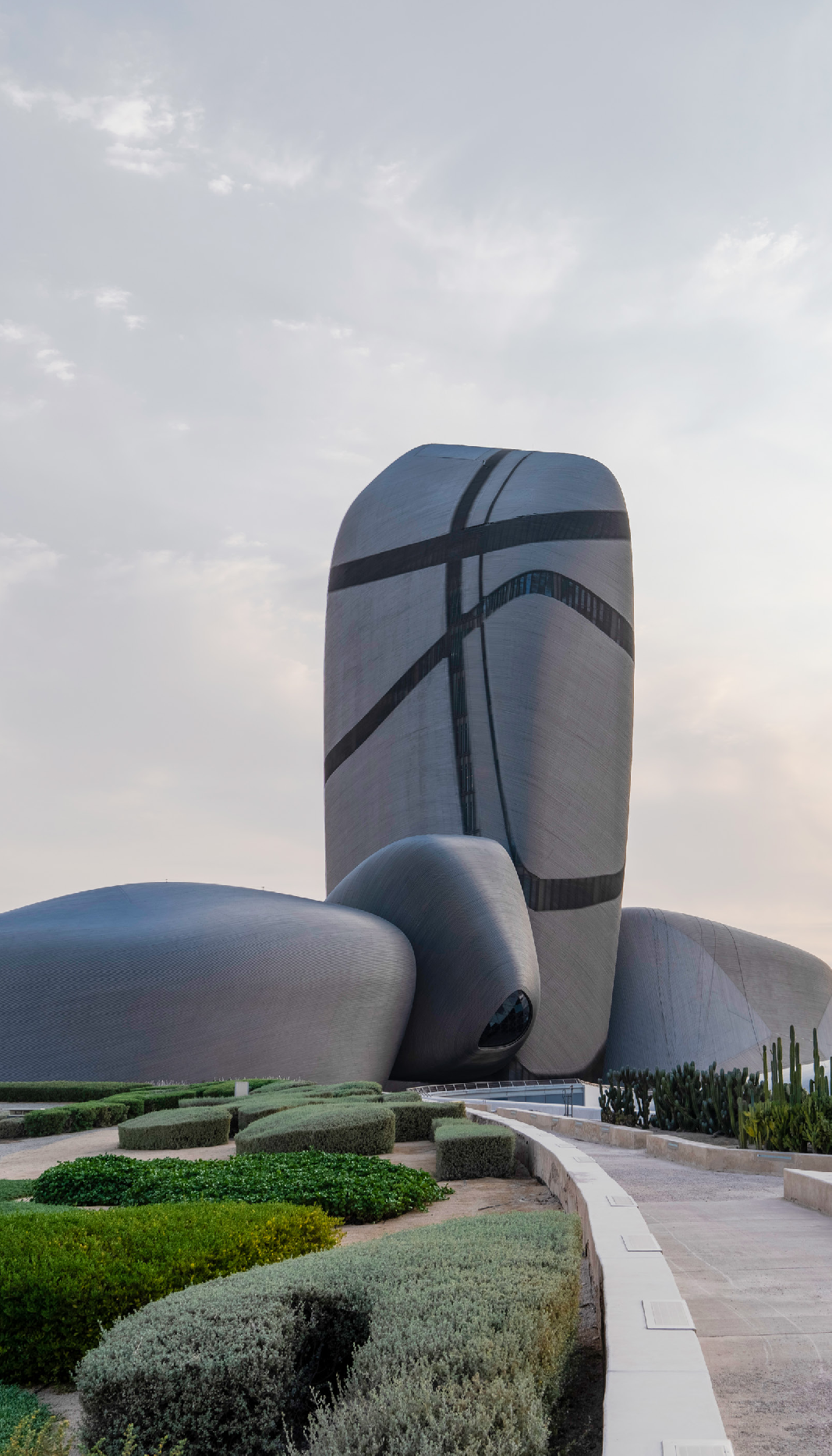
Ithra Center (King Abdulaziz Center for World Culture) in Dammam

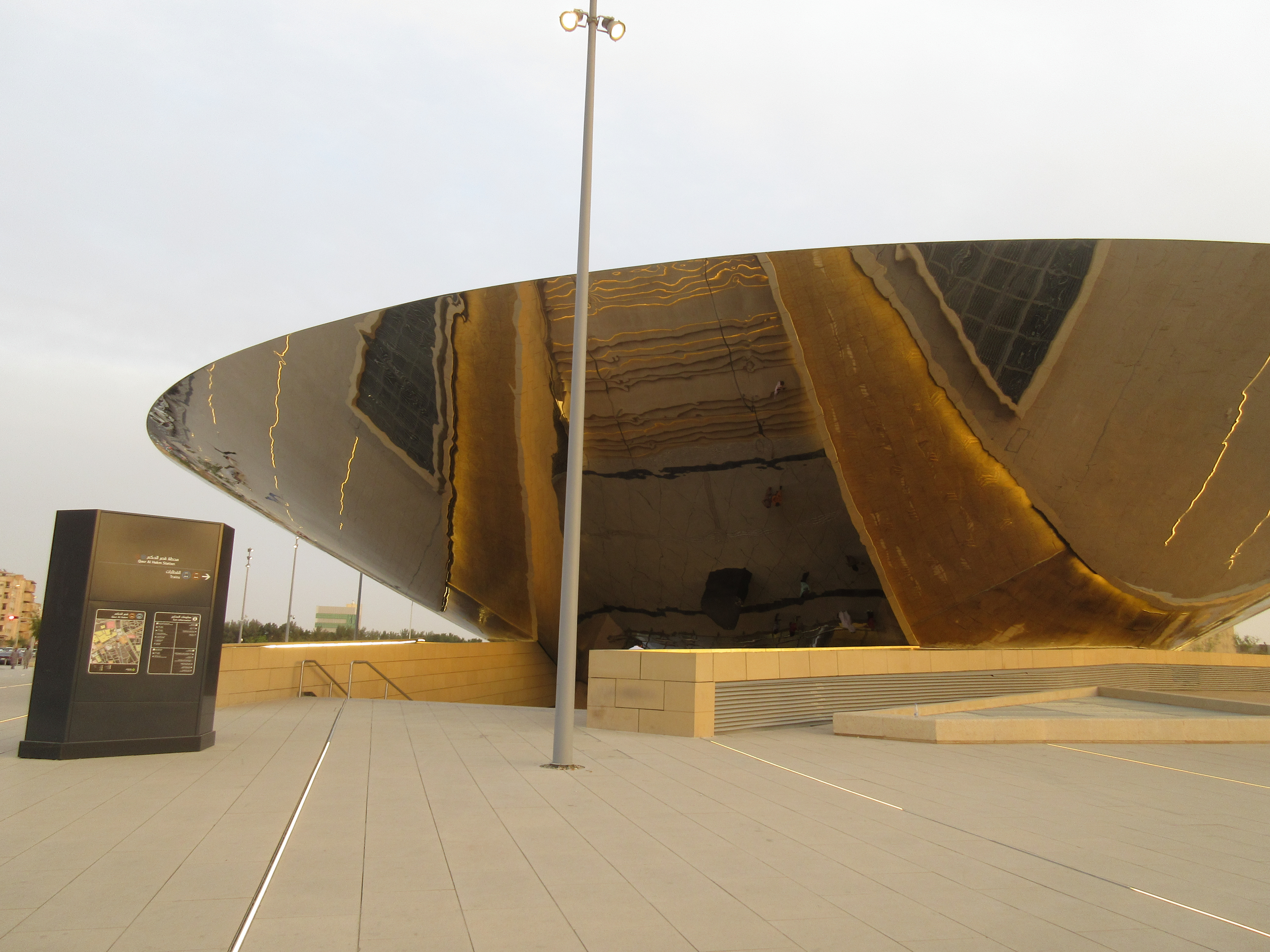
Qasr Al-Hukm metro station in Riyadh

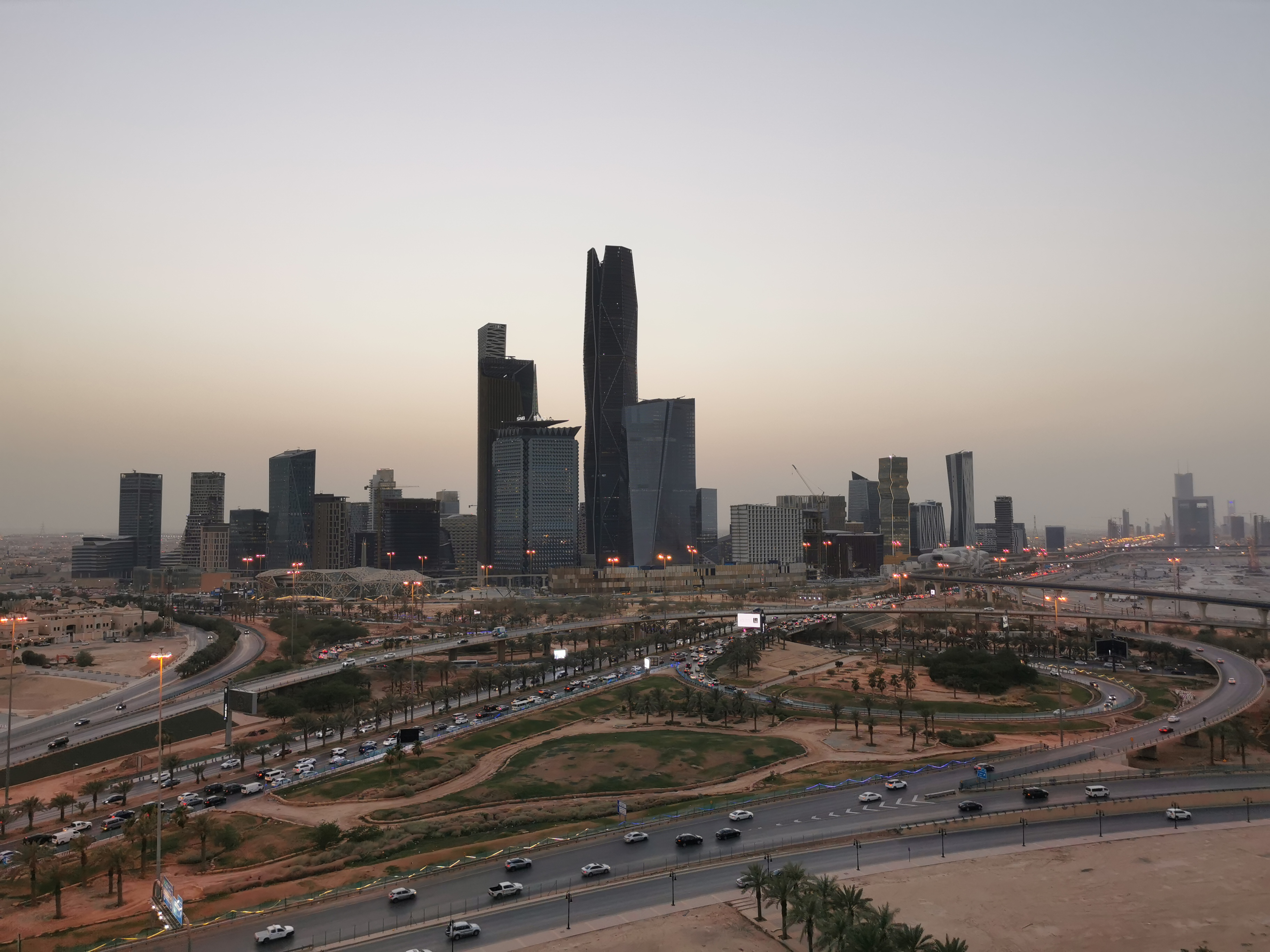
King Abdullah Financial District in Riyadh

== Islamic culture impact of architecture ==
=== Public area design ===
In Saudi Arabia, Islam is the national religion. In Islamic culture, the gender differences are emphasized, therefore, the house design and the planning of the architecture can also be influenced. In Saudi Arabia, male and female will be separated into different schools, work setting even the sitting and waiting area in public places such as hospital, airports and mosques. The shops, open on the facades overlooking the passable roads, so as not to be in the face of the neighboring houses, have been taken into account in the division of the houses vertically. The Islamic University of Al-Madinah is very common in Saudi Arabia. Take the Islamic University of Al-Madinah as an example this university is not only open to the Madinah society but also open to Muslims around the world and the history of this university is very conservative.

== Saudi Architecture Map ==
On 17 March 2025, Crown Prince Mohammed bin Salman launched the Saudi Architecture Characters Map, featuring 19 architectural styles inspired by Saudi Arabia's diverse geography, culture, and history, as part of Vision 2030. This initiative aims to preserve the unique identity and heritage of each region while enhancing urban landscapes and quality of life. The styles blend traditional elements with modern design, promoting sustainable urban planning. Each style offers three design patterns—Modern, Traditional, and Transitional—to encourage creative expression while maintaining authenticity.the project is expected to contribute over SR8 billion to the economy and create 34,000 jobs. The plan will roll out in phases, starting with major cities like Al-Ahsa and Mecca. It also encourages local talent and fosters collaboration among government agencies and developers.

== See also ==
- List of tallest buildings in Saudi Arabia
