= Bareq =

Bareq بارق Bariq
- Governorate
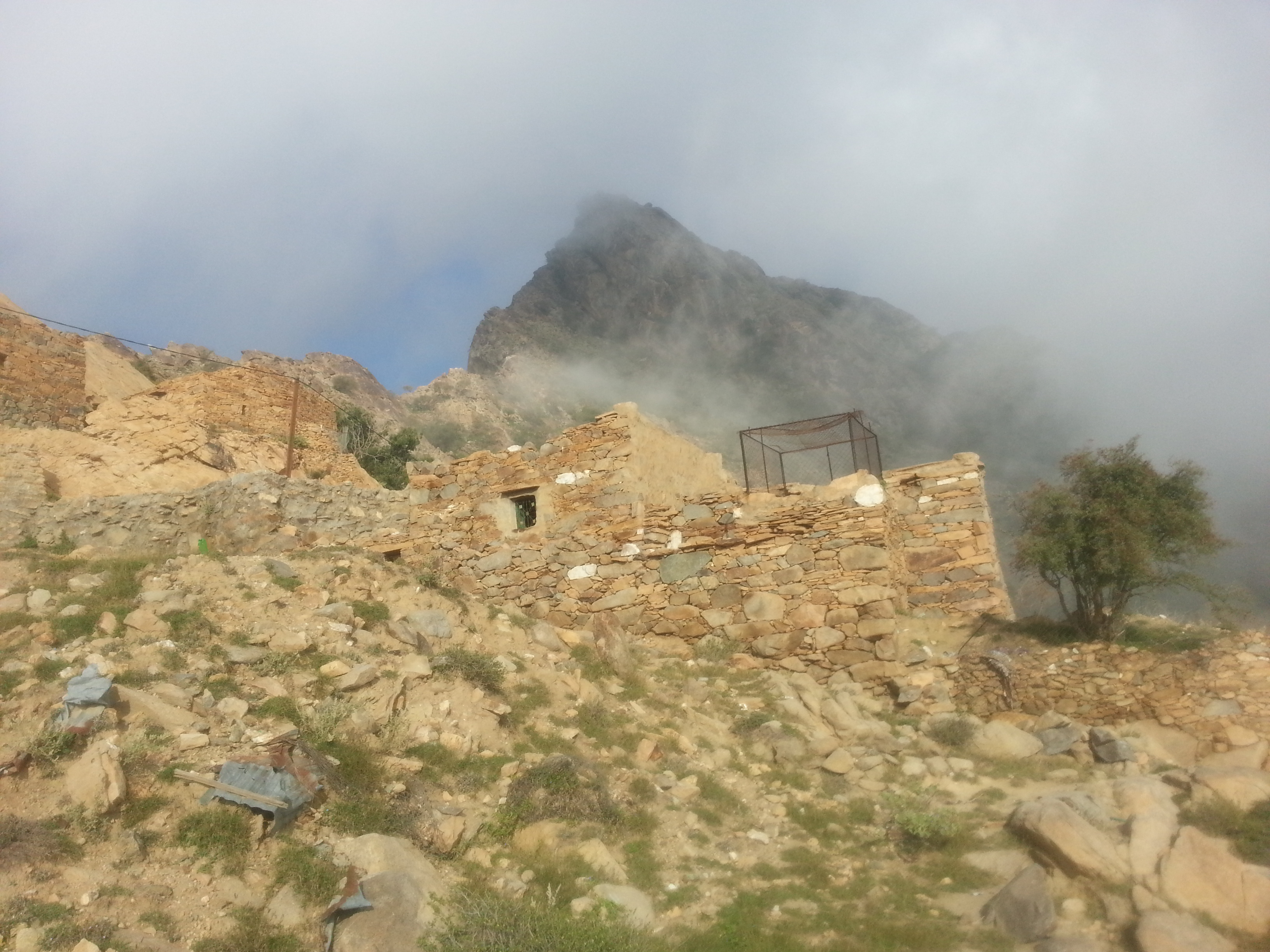
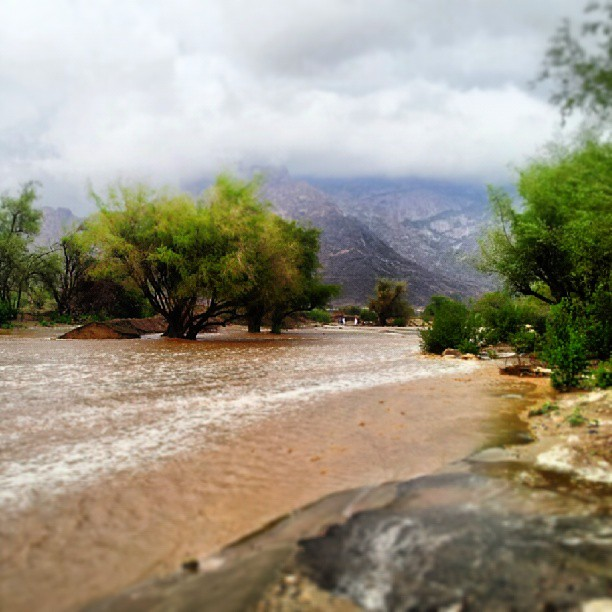
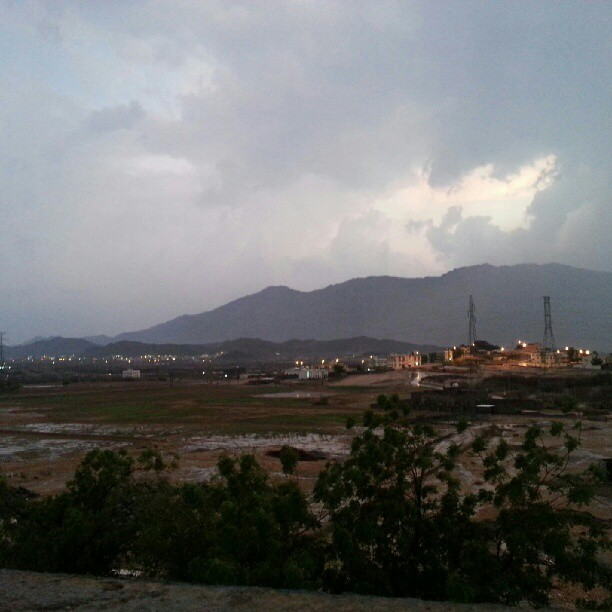
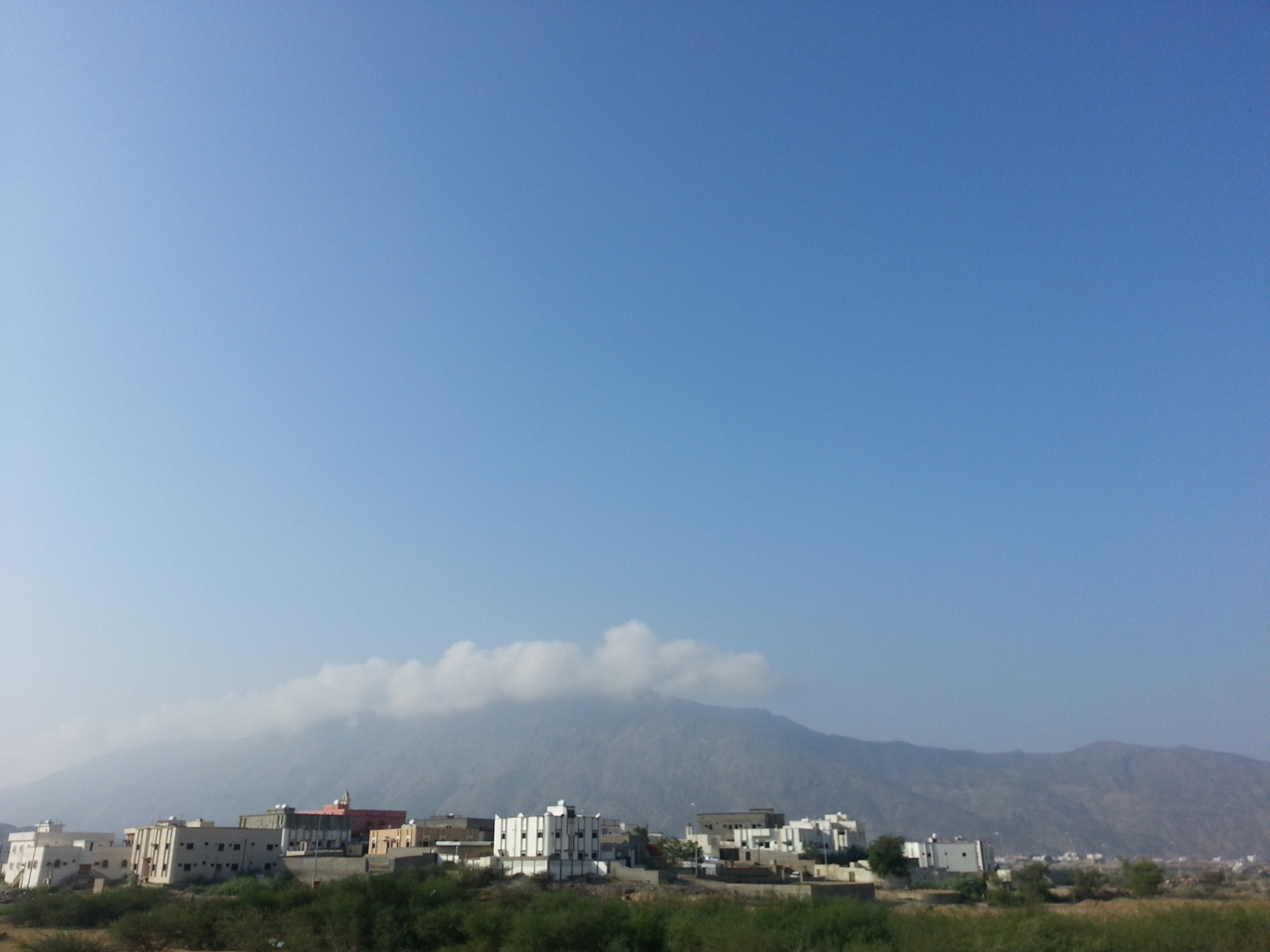
- Jabal Atherb Husnayn Munaydhir Murayba
- Nickname: عروس المجد ("Bride of Glory")
- Location within Saudi Arabia
- Coordinates: 18°55′56″N 41°56′38″E
- Country: Saudi Arabia
- Province: Asir Province
- Joined Saudi Arabia: 1925; 101 years ago
- Founder: Bariq tribe, of Azd

Government
  - Mayor: Ahmed Awad Al-Bariqi
  - Governor: Yahya Al-Hamud
- Elevation: 412 m (1,352 ft)

Population
  - Total: 44,880 (2,022 census)
- Time zone: UTC+03:00 (SAST)

Bareq (Arabic: بارق; also transliterated as Bāriq), is a governorate located in the Asir Province of Saudi Arabia in the north-west of the province, 120 km (75 mi) north of Abha. It occupies a distinct location midway between Tihamah and Asir, 412 m (1,352 ft) above sea level. With an estimated population of 75,351, it is well off economically; the city has grown rapidly and has many government services and public utilities available. It is one of Asir's winter resorts because of its natural environment and mild winter weather. Bareq has valleys.

== History ==
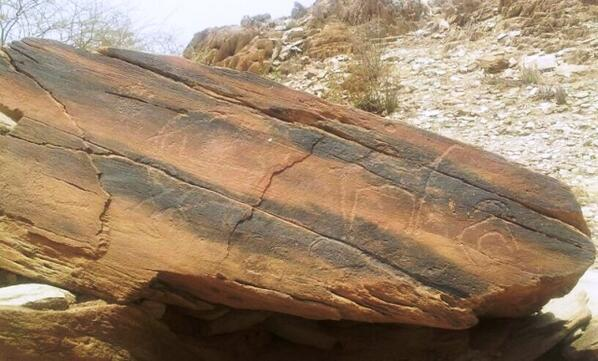
Petroglyphs in Saban, Bareq.

Bareq was founded in 220 AD. (citation?) Bareq is part of the territory which is historically known as the "yamen" as in ancient Arabs in Hijaz referred to the south from their perspective as "yamen" which is today's southern Saudi Arabia, which dates back to the second millennium BC and was inhabited by a tribe called Bariq belonging to the ancient tribe of Al-Azd that has many clans linked to it. Known before the advent of Islam as Diyār Bāriq, it was traversed by the ancient trade route from South Arabia to Mecca and the Levant, known as the winter and summer journeys. It also used to hold the Suq Hubasha in the first eight days of the month of Rajab (other sources say three days). The market and convoys were protected by the Bareq country and this souq was the market for Azd. It was one of the greatest Arab souqs of all, and also the last of the pre-Islamic markets to be destroyed. In the mid-seventh century AD, the Bareq tribe entered Islam and played a pivotal and a major role in the Muslim conquests, and many Bariqis settled in various countries after the Muslim conquest.

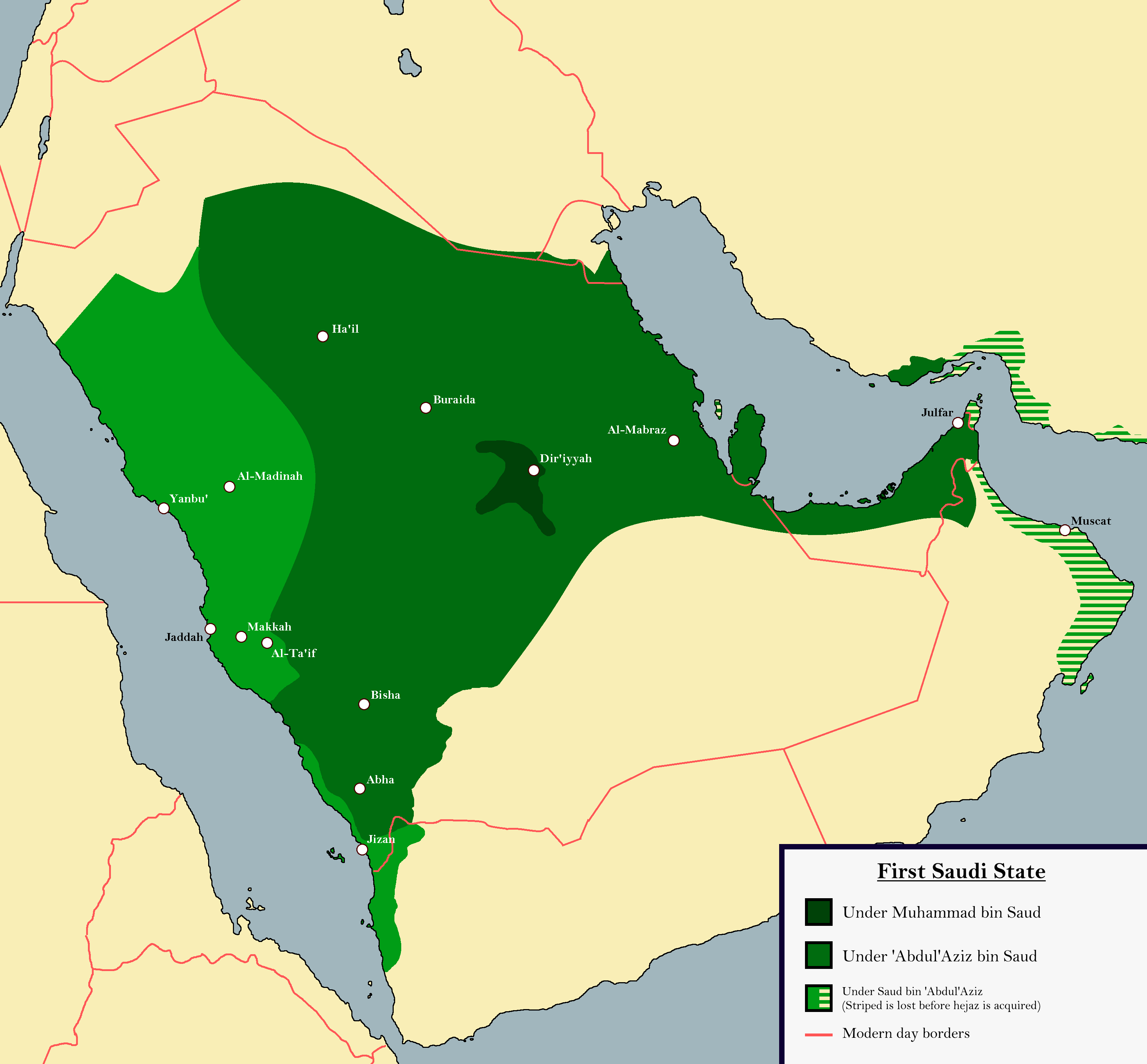
The First Saudi State

=== Modern ===
At the rise of the First Saudi State in the 18th century, the villages of Bareq were governed by local clans in a fashion similar to that of Nejd, while the large tribal confederations maintained a high degree of autonomy. Bareq gave allegiance to First Saudi State in 1809 under the leadership of the Bareq chief Ahmed Ibn Zahir of the Humaydah clan. When the First Saudi State was destroyed by the Egyptians in 1818, the Bariqis continued to fight the Egyptian forces in their region tenaciously. With the withdrawal of the Egyptians in 1840.

In 1872 the Turks took direct control of the region, making Bareq a sanjak of Turkish Yemen, remained in the Ottoman Empire for 42 years. In the 1880s, the Idrissi dynasty of Sabya became the predominant political force, ruling the region under the supervision of Turkish advisors. In the early twentieth century, in 1910, Muhammad ibn Ali al-Idrisi, a descendant of Ahmad Ibn Idris, began to establish political control of Bareq. After negotiations with Italy, which had interests nearby in Somalia, the Idrisi forces of Muhammad came into conflict with Ottoman forces in Ajama. The Idrisis were defeated in 1911 by Hashemite forces under Hussein ibn Ali, Sharif of Mecca, then still loyal to the Ottomans, but the tide turned when Muhammad ibn Ali concluded a secret military alliance with Great Britain (by then at war with the Ottomans) in 1915, and Sharif Hussein later switched sides and joined the British against the Ottomans.

Turkish troops were withdrawn following the outbreak of war in 1914, and Turkish rule in Bareq became even more tenuous. In April 1915, British agents, hoping to garner Bariqis support for the Allies, signed a treaty with the Idrisi emir guaranteeing the independence and security of Bareq upon the defeat of the Turks. Bariqi troops fought the Turks as allies of the British forces in January 1917;, in a subsequent agreement, the British government of India promised independence at the end of the war.

After the end of First World War, Muhammad ibn Ali became ruler of an internationally recognized sovereign state, until his death in 1920. The territories of the emirate reached from Bareq in the north to Hudaydah in the south. Muhammad's successors were however unable to resist the growing power of Abd Al-Aziz Ibn Saud, who began controlling South of Arabian Peninsula and its neighboring regions after Muhammad's death. Bareq accepted being part of Kingdom Saudi Arabia in 1924, and from then on Bareq was controlled by the House of Sa'ud.

== Geography ==
Bariq is at an elevation of 412 m (1,352 ft) above sea level, and approximately 90 km (56 mi) inland from the Red Sea. It's lies 120 km (75 mi) km north-west of Abha (Occupying a distinct location at the road junction at the middle between Tihama and Asir). The district of Bariq begins about 10 miles (16 km) north of "Muha'il", and covers an area of about 40 miles (64 km) from north to south and 57 miles (92 km) from east to west, and are bounded by Tanomah to the east, Majaridah to the north, Muhail to the south, and Qunfudhah to the west. It is a fertile country and well watered and extensively cultivated, maize, millet, barley, and sesame being the principal crops.

=== Neighborhoods and villages ===
- Sahil
- Bilad al-Musa
- Rass
- Husnayn.
- Saban
- Qafeel
- Atif
- Al Farah
- Qurayha
- Ajama
- Munaydhir
- Mifa
- Shahar
- Gdraymah
- Hubayah
- Jabal Atherb
- Qarn Mikhled
- Fuhah
- Faqah
- Ma`riyah
- Al-Ishy
- Murayba
- Khawsh
- Al Qahab, and more than 500 villages.

== Ethnography ==
The inhabitants of Bareq are largely made up of the Sunnis Saudi Arabians. There are also significant foreign populations, primarily from Asia, Turkey, and other Arab countries.

In Bareq & surrounding areas, a local dialect of Arabic is spoken, which is known as Bareqi Arabic (Arabic: لهجة بارقية, lahjat bariqia), spoken by some 60,000 people. It shares similarities with the Hejazi & Najdi dialects, as well as the Himyaritic language.

== Agriculture ==
The region's crops, most of which are cultivated on small plains irrigated by the floods or on the silt of the stream beds. include wheat, coffee, indigo, ginger, vegetables, and sesame. It is one of the best agricultural districts in Saudi Arabia. The region also supports cattle, sheep, and goats.

== Education ==
The first school in Bareq was established in 1952. Today Bareq is home to more than 100 public educational institutes.

== Climate ==
Bareq has an arid tropical climate with an average annual temperature of 86.5 °F (30.3 °C). January typically sees daytime highs of 82 °F (28 °C) and lows of 64 °F (18 °C), while July has average daytime highs of 92 °F (33 °C) and lows of 69 °F (21 °C). With an average annual temperature of 66.8 °F (19.3 °C).

Climate data for Bareq, Saudi Arabia
| Month | Jan | Feb | Mar | Apr | May | Jun | Jul | Aug | Sep | Oct | Nov | Dec | Year |
|---|---|---|---|---|---|---|---|---|---|---|---|---|---|
| Mean daily maximum °F (°C) | 82 (28) | 83 (28) | 84 (29) | 86 (30) | 86 (30) | 88 (31) | 92 (33) | 91 (33) | 90 (32) | 87 (31) | 86 (30) | 84 (29) | 87 (30) |
| Mean daily minimum °F (°C) | 64 (18) | 66 (19) | 66 (19) | 67 (19) | 67 (19) | 68 (20) | 69 (21) | 69 (21) | 68 (20) | 67 (19) | 66 (19) | 65 (18) | 67 (19) |
Source: .

== Cuisine ==
Bareq is known for its cuisine and traditional meals such as jalamah, khmer, haneeth, lahoh, murtabak, aerykh, asida, muqalqal, and mandi.

== Hospitals and medical care ==
- Bareq Hospital
- Alahli Hospital
- Alsaqr dental
- Alamer Hospital

== Notable people ==
- Hudhayfah al-Bariqi
- Suraqah al-Bariqi
- Urwah al-Bariqi
- Arfaja al-Bariqi
- Humaydah al-Bariqi
- Jamilah bint Adwan
- Asma bint Adiy al-Bariqiyyah
- Mu'aqqir
- Amr ibn Khalid
- Hamed al-Bariqi
- Umm al-Khair
- Al-Nu'man ibn Humaydah

== Gallery ==
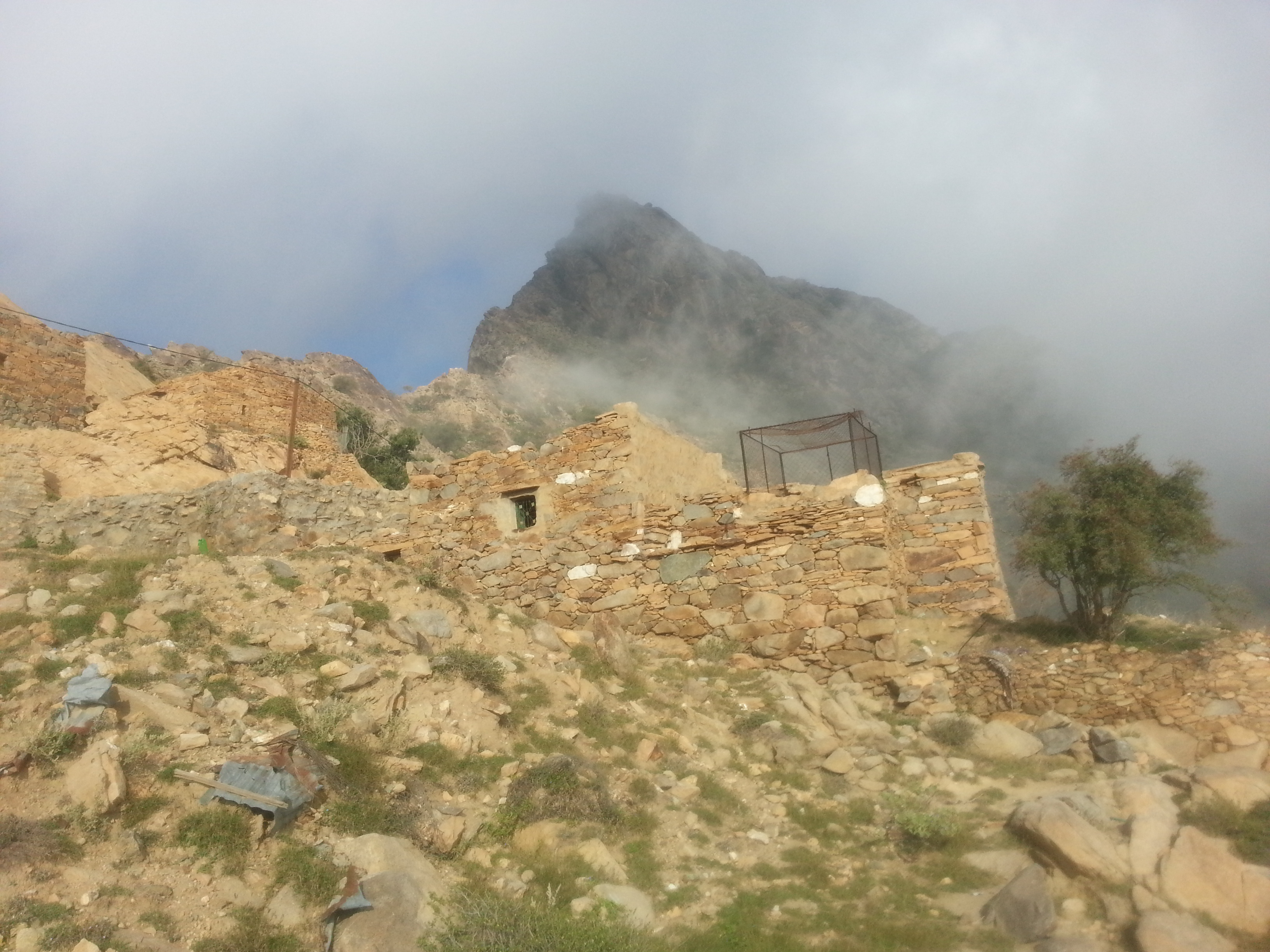
Old houses of Atharb

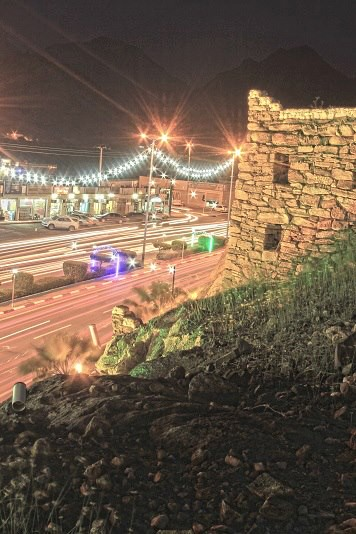
Downtown of Bareq

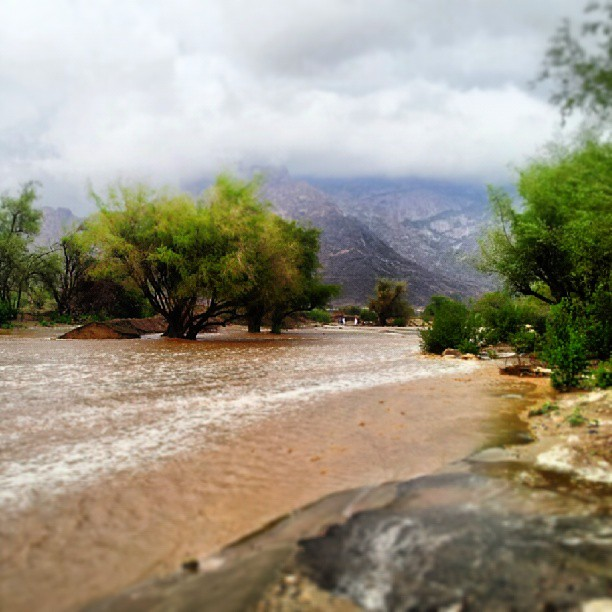
Bilad al-Musa

== See also ==
- List of cities and towns in Saudi Arabia
- History of Bariq
- Bariq tribe
- Bareqi Arabic
- Humaydah
