= Al-Bariqi =

Al-Bariqi (Arabic: البارقي, al-Barqi, also transliterated as Albarigi, Barigi, or Bariggi) is an Arabic family name denoting a member of Banu Bariq. When followed by a sun letter, the l in al assimilates to the initial consonant of the following noun, resulting in a doubled consonant.

== People ==
- Arfaja al-Bariqi, was a companion of Muhammad.
- Urwah al-Bariqi, was a companion of Muhammad.
- Suraqah al-Bariqi (died 698 CE), was a companion of Muhammad and one of the greatest Arabic poets.
- Humaydah al-Bariqi, was a companion of Muhammad.
- Hudhayfah al-Bariqi, was a companion of Muhammad.
- Mu'aqqir (died 580 CE), He is considered one of the greatest writers of Arabic poetry in pre-Islamic (Jahiliyyah) times.
- Amr ibn Khalid (died 680 CE), was one of the Companions of Husayn ibn Ali, who was martyred along with him in the battle of Karbala.
- Asma bint Adiy al-Bariqiyyah (born 340 CE), Mother of Yaqaza father of Makhzum and Taym, father of Banu Taym.
