= Sahil, Saudi Arabia =

Coordinates: 18.9286°N 41.9419°E

Sahil ساحل
- Sahil
- Interactive map of Sahil
- Country: Saudi Arabia
- Province: Asir

Government
  - Prince: Faisal bin Khalid bin Abdul Aziz Al Saud
- Elevation: 389 m (1,276 ft)

Population
  - Total: 5,000
- Time zone: UTC+3 (EAT)
  - Summer (DST): UTC+3 (EAT)

Sahil (also transliterated as Sahel, Arabic: ساحل) is the capital and the most populous city in the governorate of Bareq. It is located at an elevation of 389 metres (1,276 ft) and has a population of 5,000 . It is the capital of ″Isba'i″ tribe. Khamis as Sahil was one of the greatest Tihama (held on Thursday) of the neighbourhood.

== Climate ==
Sahil has an arid tropical climate with an average annual temperature of 86.5 °F (30.3 °C). January typically sees daytime highs of 82 °F (28 °C) and lows of 64 °F (18 °C), while July has average daytime highs of 92 °F (33 °C) and lows of 69 °F (21 °C). With an average annual temperature of 66.8 °F (19.3 °C).

== See also ==
- Bareq
- Bariq tribe
- Bareqi Arabic
