= Humaydah =

Arab tribe

Banu Humaydah
Total population
- 30,000.

Regions with significant populations
- Bareq, Al-Majardah

Languages
- Arabic

Religion
- Islam

Humaydah (also transliterated as Humaidah, Arabic: حميضة), is an Arab tribe, a subgroup of the Bariq tribe of the Qahtanite people. They were a powerful house which governed the city of Bareq until the Ibn Saud invasion and lived peacefully beside al-Ali.

Kinahan Cornwallis Said (1916):" Humeidah. Live in the western part of the district along the Muhail-Qunfudah road from Dhahab to 'Aqabet es-Suhul and extend down the 'Aqabah to Ghar el- Hindi. Consisting of 7,000 men, of whom 4,000 are nomads٫Their Chief Sheikh is Mohammed Ibn Haiazah.»

Naval Intelligence Handbooks (1916): "The most important tribe is the Humeidah, numbering 7,000 men, of whom 4,000 are nomads. They occupy the western part of the district, and the Muha'il- Qunfudah road from Dhahab to Ghar el-Hindi is in their territory. They quarrel with the Al Isba'i and are divided amongst themselves, the villagers favouring the Turks, the nomads Idrisi. Taken as a whole the tribes support Idrisi, with the exception of the settled Humeidah, and pay him taxes. They are peaceful and pleasure-loving, and by no means fond of war. At the same time they are not above harrying small Turkish convoys.»

Wilfred Thesiger (1946): "This desolate country continued until we reached the wadi khat and the cultivated lands of the Humaidha tribe at barik who resemble the 'Amara and live in well-built, flat-roofed, stone houses. These sedentary tribes own a few camels, some cattle, and fair-sized herds of sheep and goats. They are however essentially cultivators who grow dhurra or "dukhn" (bull-rush millet), either on small plains irrigated by the floods or on the silt of the stream beds.»

== Origin ==
Banu Humaydah trace their origin to Humaydah b. al-Harith b. Awf b. Amr b. Sa'd b. Thailbh b. Kinanah b. Bariq . They lived in Bareq with the other Bariq tribes, Al-Musa ibn Ali, Al- Isb'ai and Al-Jabali.

== Humaydah branches ==
- Al-Hajri
- Al-Salim
- Maha'mula
- Aaram (Al-Aram)
- Gdraymah (Al-Gdraymah)
- Fseel (Al-Fseel)

== Influential people of Bariq ==
- Humaydah al-Bariqi— chief
- Al-Nu'man ibn Humaydah – chief
- Hamed al-Bariqi

== See also ==
- Azd
- Bareq City
- Bariq
- Qahtanite
