= Al-Nu'man ibn Humaydah =

Philosopher in Classical Arabia

- النعمان بن حميضة البارقي
- Born: An-Nu'man ibn Humaydah al-Bariqi
- Occupation: Poet

An-Nu'man ibn Humaydah al-Bariqi (Arabic: النعمان بن حميضة البارقي; died 600 CE) was a philosopher in Classical Arabia. In addition, he was knight and the leader of the Bariq tribe, located in Bariq of Azd, Yemen and was famous for its glory.

== Lineage ==
His full name was al-Nu'man b. Humaydah b. al-Harith b. Awf b. Amr b. Sa`d b. Thailbh b. Kinanah al-Bariqi Ibn Bariq Ibn Uday Ibn Haritha Ibn Amr Mazikiee Ibn Aamr bin Haritha Algtarif bin Imru al-Qais Thailb bin Mazen Ibn Al-Azd Ibn Al-Ghoth Ibn Nabit Ibn Malik bin Zaid Ibn Kahlan Ibn Saba'a (Sheba) Ibn Yashjub Ibn Yarab Ibn Qahtan Ibn Hud (Eber).

- Humaydah b. al-Harith (Arabic: حميضة بن الحارث), was his father.
- Humaydah b. al-Nu'man b. Humaydah al-Bariqi (Arabic: حميضة بن النعمان بن حميضة البارقي), was his son.

== Quotes ==
- Telling the truth has left me no friends.
