= Humaydah al-Bariqi =

- Died: Bariq
- Military career
- Allegiance: Muhammad; Rashidun Caliphate; Bariq
- Branch: Rashidun army
- Rank: Commander

Humaydah ibn an-Nu'man al-Bariqi (Arabic: حميضة بن النعمان البارقي), was a companion of Muhammad. He was the leader of the tribe of Bariq and an extremely successful military general during the reign of Rashidun Caliph Umar. Humaydah also fought under Sa`d's command against the Sassanid army at the Battle of al-Qādisiyyah.

== Lineage ==
His full name was Humaydah b. al-Nu'man b. Humaydah b. al-Harith b. Awf b. Amr b. Sa`d b. Thailbh b. Kinanah al-Bariqi Ibn Bariq Ibn Uday Ibn Haritha Ibn Amr Mazikiee Ibn Aamr bin Haritha Algtarif bin Imru al-Qais Thailb bin Mazen Ibn Al-Azd Ibn Al-Ghoth Ibn Nabit Ibn Malik bin Zaid Ibn Kahlan Ibn Saba'a (Sheba) Ibn Yashjub Ibn Yarab Ibn Qahtan Ibn Hud (Eber).

Nu'man b. Humaydah al-Bariqi (Arabic: النعمان بن حميضة البارقي) was his father.
