= Ajama =

Coordinates: 18.9167°N 41.9167°E

Suq al Ajamah العجمه
- Ajama
- Interactive map of Suq al Ajamah
- Country: Saudi Arabia
- Province: Asir

Government
  - Prince: Faisal bin Khalid bin Abdul Aziz Al Saud
- Elevation: 375 m (1,230 ft)

Population
  - Total: 2,000
- Time zone: UTC+3 (EAT)
  - Summer (DST): UTC+3 (EAT)

Ajama also known as Suq-El-Ajama or Rabu' el-A'jama , Arabic: العجمة) is a village in the sub-governorate of Bariq in the province of Asir, Saudi Arabia. It is located at an elevation of 375 metres (1,230 ft) and has a population of about 1,000 to 2,000 naming comes from Al-Ajmeh - by opening the neglected eye, al-Jim and al-Mim - and al-Ajmeh, as the linguists originally put it, is al-Sakhr al-Salab, which is the well-known limestone. It was the capital of The Humaydah tribe. Kinahan Cornwallis Said (1916), suq el-ajamah a large village of about 300 stone houses, former seat of a Turkish markaz and the most important market (held on Wednesday ) of the neighbourhood.

== See also ==
- List of cities and towns in Saudi Arabia
- Regions of Saudi Arabia
