= Amr ibn Khalid =

Amr ibn Khalid al-Bariqi al-Azdi(Arabic: عمرو بن خالد; died 680) was one of the Companions of Husayn ibn Ali, who was martyred along with him in the battle of Karbala. Amr ibn Khalid joined Husayn ibn Ali in Karbala and fought alongside him. He belonged to bariq of Banu Azd tribe. His son Khalid was amongst Martyrs of Karbala.

== Lineage ==
His full name was Amr b. Khalid b. al-Harith b. Awf b. Amr b. Sa`d b. Thailbh b. Kinanah al-Bariqi Ibn Bariq Ibn Uday Ibn Haritha Ibn Amr Mazikiee Ibn Aamr bin Haritha Algtarif bin Imru al-Qais Thailb bin Mazen Ibn Al-Azd Ibn Al-Ghoth Ibn Nabit Ibn Malik bin Zaid Ibn Kahlan Ibn Saba'a (Sheba) Ibn Yashjub Ibn Yarab Ibn Qahtan Ibn Hud (Eber).

Asmaa b. Khalid al-Bariqi (Arabic: أسماء بن خالد بن عوف البارقي) was his Brother.

== See also ==
- Husayn ibn Ali
- Battle of Karbala
- Martyrs of Karbala
- Mourning of Muharram
- Day of Ashura
