= Qahab (disambiguation) =

Qahab is a village and municipality in the Babek Rayon of Nakhchivan, Azerbaijan.

Qahab may also refer to:

- Lashkar-e-Qahab, an Islamist militant group responsible for the 2006 Varanasi bombings
- Al Qahab, a village in the sub-governorate of Bariq in the province of Asir, Saudi Arabia
- Qahab, a village in Zanjanrud-e Pain Rural District, Zanjanrud District, Zanjan County, Zanjan Province, Iran
- Qahab-e Shomali Rural District, a rural district (dehestan) in the Central District of Isfahan County, Isfahan Province, Iran
- Qahab-e Jonubi Rural District, a rural district (dehestan) in the Central District of Isfahan County, Isfahan Province, Iran
