= Suraqah al-Bariqi =

Travel companion of Muhammad

- Born: 621; Bareq, Arabia
- Died: 698; Kufa, Iraq
- Occupation: Poet
- Writing career
- Language: Arabic
- Notable works: Poems on courage, philosophy of life, and battles

Suraqah al-Bariqi (Arabic: سراقة بن مرداس البارقي; died 698) was a companion of Muhammad and was a member of the Tribe Bariq. He was an Arab from Bareq in Arabian Peninsula, which was then part of the Umayyad caliphate. He is considered one of the greatest poets. Much of his poetry revolves around the philosophy of life. Some consider his poems to be a great representation of his life story. He started writing poetry when he was young. He is well known for his sharp intelligence and wittiness. Among the topics he discussed were courage, the philosophy of life, and the description of battles. His great talent brought him very close to many leaders of his time. He praised those leaders and kings. His powerful and honest poetic style earned great popularity in his time. He was a contemporary of the great trio, Akhtal, Farazdaq, and Jarir, whose names stand out so pre-eminently in the list of the Umayyad bards that all contemporary poets are thrown into the shade. Thus there is no article on our poet in the Kitab al-Aghani, and he would have passed quite unnoticed but for his taking part in the literary duel between Farazdaq and Jarir. He, too, joined in the fray with his sympathies for Farazdaq. The anecdotes relating to the Flyting which he and Jarir composed against each other, as narrated on the authority of Al-Hajjaj ibn Yusuf, will be found interesting.

== Lineage ==
His full name was Suraqah b. Mirdas b. Asmaa b. Khalid b. al-Harith b. Awf b. Amr b. Sa`d b. Thailbh b. Kinanah al-Bariqi Ibn Bariq Ibn Uday Ibn Haritha Ibn Amr Mazikiee Ibn Aamr bin Haritha Algtarif bin Imru al-Qais Thailb bin Mazen Ibn Al-Azd Ibn Al-Ghoth Ibn Nabit Ibn Malik bin Zaid Ibn Kahlan Ibn Saba'a (Sheba) Ibn Yashjub Ibn Yarab Ibn Qahtan Ibn Hud (Eber).

Asmaa b. Khalid al-Bariqi (Arabic: أسماء بن خالد بن عوف البارقي) was his grandfather.

== Suraqah & Jarir ==
It is said that Muhammad b. 'Umair b. 'Utârid al-Dârimî, a noble, offered four thousand dirhams and a horse to the poet who could compose a poem giving al-Farazdaq preference over Jarir. Of all poets Surâqah, who had already composed some invective upon Jarir, took up the challenge and produced a piece of lampoon which was carried to Jarîr, requiring him to make a reply forthwith. Jarir tried throughout the whole night but failed. At break of day, however, his poetical genius came to his aid and the sharp lampoon that this great poet then produced is said to have silenced Surâqah against Jarir once for all.
