= Yahya Al-Hamud =

Saudi politician

2nd Governor of Bareq
- Incumbent
- Assumed office 14 April 2016
- Preceded by: Sultan Al Sudairi

Member of the 'Asir Region communal council
- In office 1 October 2011 – 13 December 2016

Personal details
- Born: Yahya Abdulrahman Al-Hamud; Ash Shaaf, Asir, Saudi Arabia

Yahya Abdulrahman Al-Hamud (born 1960) is a Saudi politician and Governor of Bareq since April 2016. He has previously served as a member of the 'Asir Region communal council.

== Early life ==
Al-Hamud is from Ash Shaaf, Asir and belongs to the Shahran Tribe. Grandson of "Ibn Hamud", Sheikh of Shahran. He was born in 1960. He did his early education in Abha, and holds a certificate in Planning, Public Administration and Project Management from King Abdulaziz University.

== See also ==
- Bareq
- Saudi Arabia
- 'Asir Region
- History of Bariq
- Mohammed bin Saud Al-Mathami
