= Urwah al-Bariqi =

Muslim general

Urwah Ibn Abi Al-Ja"d Al-Bariq
- عروة البارقي
- Born: about 610; Bareq, Arabia
- Died: 681; Kufa
- Military career
- Allegiance: Rashidun Caliphate. Ahl al-Bayt
- Branch: Rashidun army
- Rank: Commander; Governor of kufa (635–637)

Urwah Ibn Abi Al-Ja"d Al-Bariq (Arabic: عروة البارقي) was a companion of Muhammad. He was a governor of Kufa and was involved in the early Muslim conquest of Persia

== Lineage ==
Urwah Ibn Abi Al-Ja"d Al-Bariqi From Bariq Ibn Uday Ibn Haritha Ibn Amr Mazikiee Ibn Aamr bin Haritha Algtarif bin Imru al-Qais Thailb bin Mazen Ibn Al-Azd Ibn Al-Ghoth Ibn Nabit Ibn Ismail or Malik bin Zaid Ibn Kahlan Ibn Saba'a (Sheba) Ibn Yashjub (Yaman) Ibn Yarub Ibn Qahtan Ibn (Abir).

== Ahadith transmitted by him ==
Narrated: Urwa said that the Messenger of Allah said "Good will remain (as a permanent quality) in the forelocks of horses (meant for Jihad) till the Day of Resurrection, for they bring about a reward (in the Hereafter) or booty (in this world).

== Muhammad invoked a blessing on him ==
Muhammad gave him a dinar to buy a sacrificial animal or a sheep. He bought two sheep, sold one of them for a dinar, and brought him a sheep and dinar. So he invoked a blessing on him in his business dealing, and he was such that if had he bought dust he would have made a profit from it.

== Sunni view ==
He is one of the narrators of hadith, and like all of the Sahaba, is considered trustworthy.

== Shi'a view ==
Urwah is considered trustworthy.
