= Hubasha =

Hubasha was one among the greatest marketplaces of Arabia. It was in the territory of the Azdi tribe in Tihama, six days' journey from Mecca. It was the last of the Jahiliyyah (pre-Islamic Arabia) markets to be destroyed. For many years, it was overseen annually during the month of Rajab by troops appointed by the governor of Mecca. This state of affairs continued until 197 AH (AD 812–813), when the governor's appointee was killed by a tribesman. Under the advice of Meccan scholars, the Governor of Mecca, Da'ud b. ‘Isa b. Musa, decided to destroy the market.

== See also ==
- Bariq
- Province of Bariq
- History of Bariq
