= Faqah =

Coordinates: 18°54′37.36″N 41°59′57″E

Faqah فقعة
- Interactive map of Faqah
- Country: Saudi Arabia
- Province: Asir

Government
  - Prince: Faisal bin Khalid bin Abdul Aziz Al Saud
- Elevation: 1,400 m (4,600 ft)

Population (1970)
  - Total: 2,000
- Time zone: UTC+3 (EAT)
  - Summer (DST): UTC+3 (EAT)

Faqah (Arabic: فقعة) is an old village in the sub-governorate of Bariq in the province of Asir, Saudi Arabia. It has a population of 2,000 (1970). It is connected with the main road by a 10 Kilometer. In the 1970s a large number of the people of Faqah left the village and immigrated in many directions in Bilad al-Musa.

== See also ==
- List of cities and towns in Saudi Arabia
- Regions of Saudi Arabia
