= Munaydhir =

Coordinates: 18.9464°N 41.9164°E

Munaydir المنيظر
- Munayzir
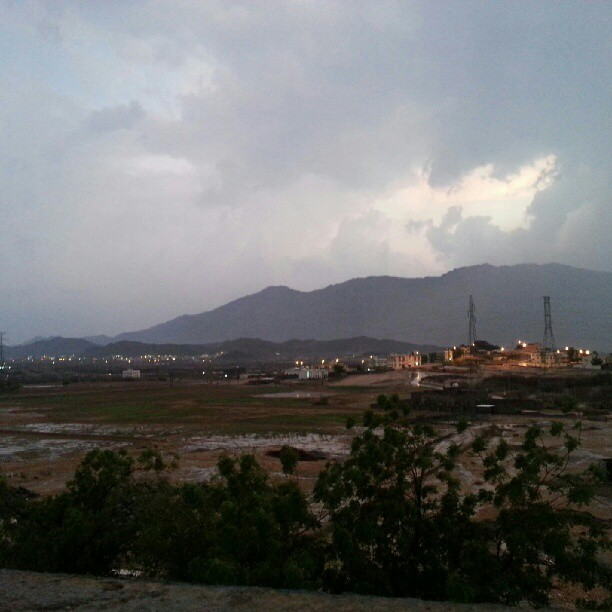
- Interactive map of Munaydir
- Country: Saudi Arabia
- Province: Asir

Government
  - Prince: Faisal bin Khalid bin Abdul Aziz Al Saud
- Elevation: 382 m (1,253 ft)

Population
  - Total: 1,000
- Time zone: UTC+3 (EAT)
  - Summer (DST): UTC+3 (EAT)

Munaydhir (also as Al Munaydhir or Al Munayzir, Arabic: المنيظر) is a village in the sub-governorate of Bariq in the province of Asir, Saudi Arabia. It is located at an elevation of 382 metres (1,253 ft) and has a population of about 500 to 2,000.

== Climate ==
Munaydhir has an arid tropical climate with an average annual temperature of 86.1 °F (30.1 °C). January typically sees daytime highs of 82 °F (28 °C) and lows of 64 °F (18 °C), while July has average daytime highs of 102 °F (39 °C) and lows of 71 °F (22 °C).

== See also ==
- List of cities and towns in Saudi Arabia
- Regions of Saudi Arabia
