= Murayba =

Coordinates: 18.9472°N 41.9069°E

Muraybi المريبعة
- Murayba
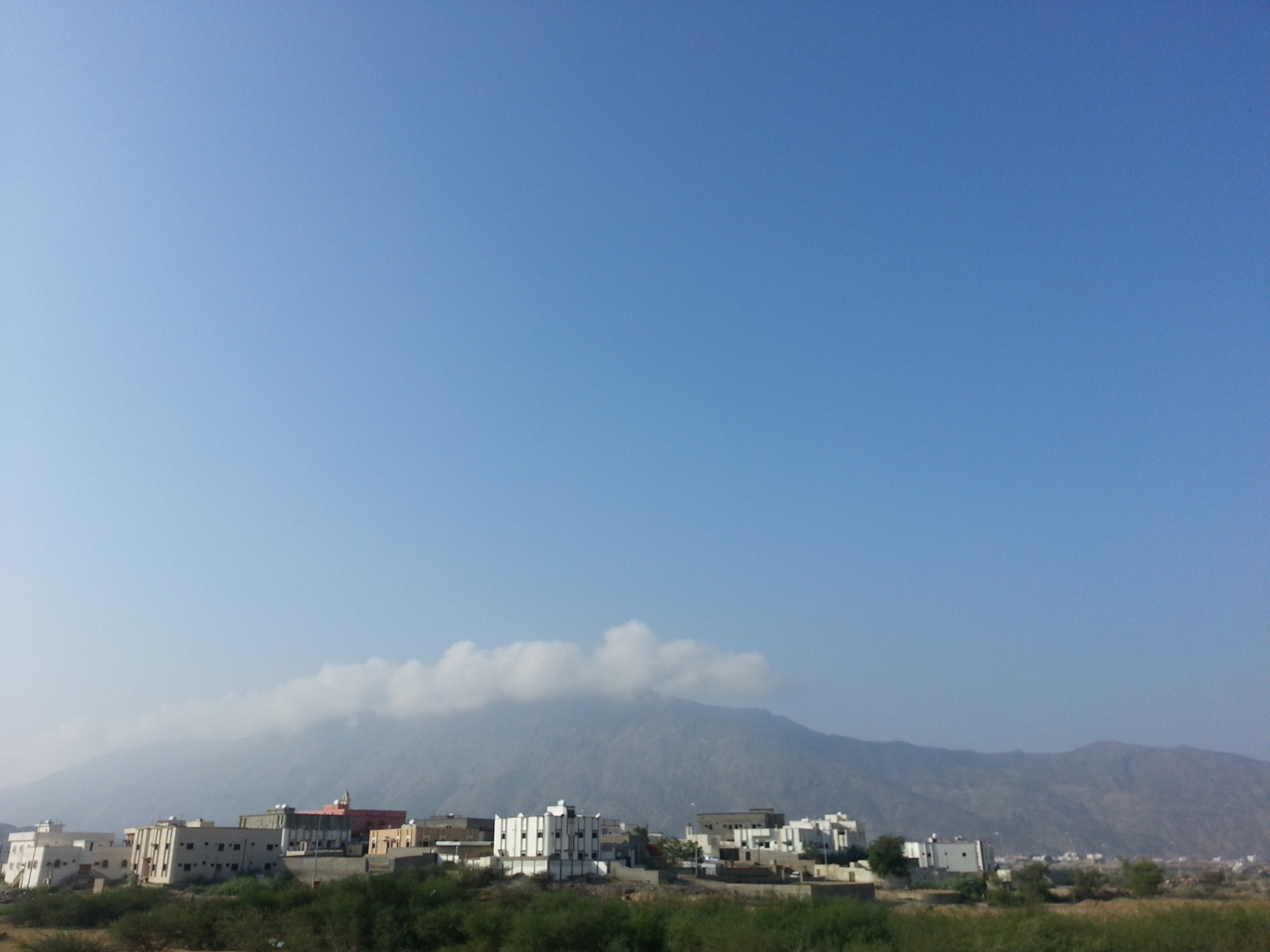
- Interactive map of Muraybi
- Country: Saudi Arabia
- Province: Asir

Government
  - Prince: Faisal bin Khalid bin Abdul Aziz Al Saud
- Elevation: 365 m (1,198 ft)

Population
  - Total: 2,000
- Time zone: UTC+3 (EAT)
  - Summer (DST): UTC+3 (EAT)

Murayba (also as Muraybi` or Al Murayba, Arabic: المريبعة) is a village in the sub-governorate of Bariq in the province of Asir, Saudi Arabia. It is located at an elevation of 365 metres (1,198 ft) and has a population of about 1,000 to 2,000.

== See also ==
- List of cities and towns in Saudi Arabia
- Regions of Saudi Arabia
