= Mu'aqqir al-Bariqi =

Poet

- Born: Bariq, Azd, Yemen
- Died: 580 CE
- Occupations: Poet, Knight, Tribal Leader
- Writing career
- Language: Arabic

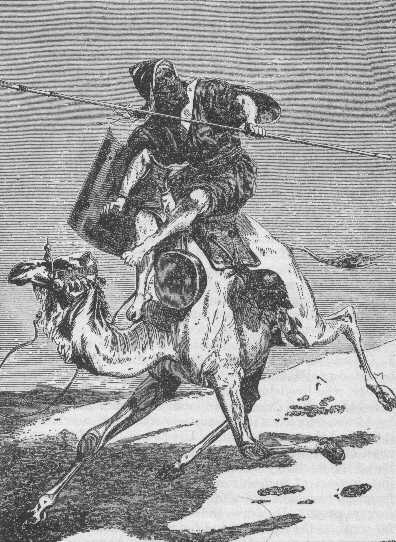

Mu'aqqir (Arabic: معقر) or Amr Ibn Aws b. Himar al-Bariqi (died 580 CE), a knight and the leader of the Bariq tribe which was in Bariq Of Azd Yemen and was famous for its glory, He is considered one of the greatest writers of Arabic poetry in pre-Islamic (Jahiliyyah) times.

== Lineage ==
Amr b. al-Harith b. Aws b. Himar b. Hjna b. Mazen b. Thailbh b. Kinanah al-Bariqi ibn bariq Ibn Uday Ibn Haritha Ibn Amr Mazikiee Ibn Aamr bin Haritha Algtarif bin Imru al-Qais Thailb bin Mazen Ibn Al-Azd Ibn Al-Ghoth Ibn Nabit Ibn Malik bin Zaid Ibn Kahlan Ibn Saba'a (Sheba) Ibn Yashjub Ibn Yarab Ibn Qahtan Ibn Hud (prophet) (Eber).
