= Qurayha =

Coordinates: 18.8722°N 42.0097°E

Qurayha القريحاء
- al-Qurayha
- Interactive map of Qurayha
- Country: Saudi Arabia
- Province: Asir

Government
  - Prince: Faisal bin Khalid bin Abdul Aziz Al Saud
- Elevation: 402 m (1,319 ft)

Population
  - Total: 4,556
- Time zone: UTC+3 (EAT)
  - Summer (DST): UTC+3 (EAT)

Qurayha (also as al-Qurayha', al-Qaraiha, or al-Jaraihah, Arabic: القريحاء) is a neighborhood in the sub-governorate of Bariq in the province of Asir, Saudi Arabia. It is located at an elevation of 402 metres (1,319 ft) and had a population of 4,556 in 2004. Qurayha was most important market (held on Sunday) of the neighbourhood. It is the capital of Musa ibn Ali tribe.

== See also ==
- List of cities and towns in Saudi Arabia
- Regions of Saudi Arabia
