= Khawsh =

Coordinates: 18.9950°N 41.8987°E

Al-Khawsh الخوش
- Khawsh
- Interactive map of Al-Khawsh
- Country: Saudi Arabia
- Province: Asir

Government
  - Prince: Faisal bin Khalid bin Abdul Aziz Al Saud
- Elevation: 350 m (1,150 ft)

Population (2012)
  - Total: 4,500
- Time zone: UTC+3 (EAT)
  - Summer (DST): UTC+3 (EAT)

Khawsh, (also as al-Khawsh), Arabic: الخوش) is a neighborhood in Bareq, Saudi Arabia. It's located at an elevation of 350 meters above sea level and has a population of 4,500. It was mentioned in the Dictionary of the Arabian Peninsula (1970 AD) "Al-Khosh Al-Shamaliya: A village in the subsidiary villages of the Emirate of Bariq, affiliated to the Emirate of the Abha region. It is located at an altitude of 395 meters above sea level, and is inhabited by between 500 and 2000 people. It is connected with the main road (Jeddah – Abha). And in the village there is a school and a shop". Al-Khosh Al-Janubiyah: A village in the sub-Emirate of Bariq, affiliated to the Emirate of Abha Region. It is located at an altitude of 368 meters above sea level, and is home to approximately 100 people. It is connected to the main road (Jeddah – Abha / Jazan), but it takes five minutes to get from the village to that road. It is connected with the main road by a 0.1 Kilometer. It's one of the largest neighborhoods of Bareq.

== See also ==
- List of cities and towns in Saudi Arabia
- Regions of Saudi Arabia
