= Maʽriyah =

Coordinates: 18.85°N 41.9667°E

Maʽriya العيرية
- ʽAiriyah
- Interactive map of Maʽriya
- Country: Saudi Arabia
- Province: Asir

Government
  - Prince: Faisal bin Khalid bin Abdul Aziz Al Saud
- Elevation: 379 m (1,243 ft)

Population
  - Total: 2,000
- Time zone: UTC+3 (EAT)
  - Summer (DST): UTC+3 (EAT)

Maʽriyah (معریاہ) (Arabic: إمعيرية Imaʽairiya, also العيرية Al-ʽairiyah) is a neighborhood in the sub-governorate of Bariq in the province of Asir, Saudi Arabia.

It has a population of 500 to 2,000.

== Climate ==
Its climate offers hot summers and mild winters. In the highlands, the climate is moderate throughout the year but cold in winter. The average temperature ranges between 30 °C, and the lowest is 18 °C.

Annual rainfall ranges between 600-700 mm per year. It falls in all seasons of the year, although mostly in spring and winter.

== See also ==
- List of cities and towns in Saudi Arabia
- Regions of Saudi Arabia
