= Atif al-Salim =

Coordinates: 18.896786°N 41.920781°E

عاطف Atf
- عاطف آل سالم
- Interactive map of عاطف
- Country: Saudi Arabia
- Province: Bareq, Asir

Government
  - Prince: Faisal bin Khalid bin Abdul Aziz Al Saud
- Elevation: 432 m (1,417 ft)

Population (1970)
  - Total: 1,000
- Time zone: UTC+3 (EAT)
  - Summer (DST): UTC+3 (EAT)

AITF also known as Aitf Al-Salim, (Arabic: عاطف) is a village in the sub-governorate of Bariq in the province of Asir, Saudi Arabia. It is located at an elevation of 432 metres (1,417 ft) and has a population of about 500 to 1,000.

== See also ==
- List of cities and towns in Saudi Arabia
- Regions of Saudi Arabia
