= Husnayn =

Al Husnayn الحصنين
- Husnayn
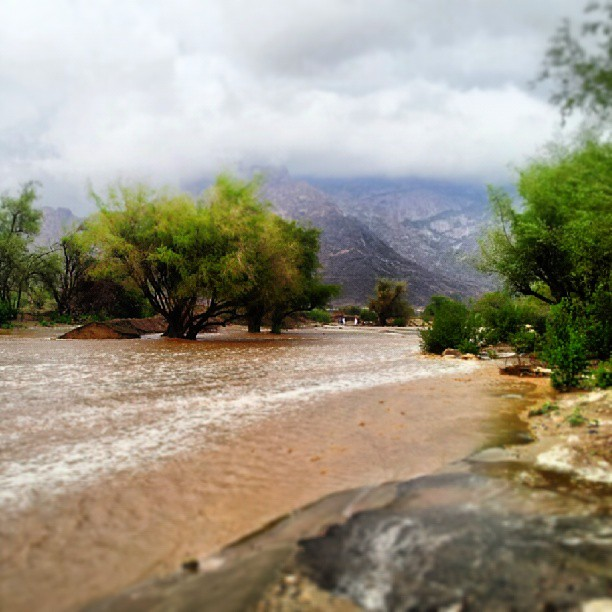
- Country: Saudi Arabia
- Province: Asir

Government
  - Prince: Faisal bin Khalid bin Abdul Aziz Al Saud
- Elevation: 436 m (1,430 ft)

Population (1970)
  - Total: 2,000
- Time zone: UTC+3 (EAT)
  - Summer (DST): UTC+3 (EAT)

HUSNAYN, Arabic: الحصنين) is a village in the sub-governorate of Bariq in the province of Asir, Saudi Arabia. It is located at an elevation of 396 metres (1,299 ft) and has a population of 2,000 (1970). It is connected with the main road by a 9.8 Kilometer. Some events occurred in the village of Al-Husnain in Asir Governorate, when the village experienced heavy rains and torrential rains in 2016, which almost caused a disaster. In each season, the municipal council was appealed so that disaster would never be resolved.

== Etymology and usage ==
Husnayn, is meaning, (The two towers). It was in the village Two Towers stone but Tearing Down.

== See also ==
- List of cities and towns in Saudi Arabia
- Regions of Saudi Arabia
