= Sāban =

Coordinates: 18.873194°N 41.941423°E

Sa'ban صعبان
- Saban
- Interactive map of Sa'ban
- Province: Asir

Government
  - Prince: Faisal bin Khalid bin Abdul Aziz Al Saud
- Elevation: 470 m (1,540 ft)

Population (2012)
  - Total: 2,000
- Time zone: UTC+3 (EAT)
  - Summer (DST): UTC+3 (EAT)

Saban (Arabic: صعبان) is a village in the sub-governorate of Bariq in the province of Asir, Saudi Arabia.

== Location and population ==
It is located at an elevation of 470 meters and has a population of 2,000.

== Connections ==
It is connected with the main road by a 4 Kilometer.

== See also ==
- List of cities and towns in Saudi Arabia
- Regions of Saudi Arabia
