= Naxışnərgiz =

- Municipality
- Location within Azerbaijan
- Coordinates: 39°15′23″N 45°31′13″E
- Country: Azerbaijan
- Autonomous republic: Nakhchivan
- District: Babek

Population (2005)
  - Total: 518
- Time zone: UTC+4 (AZT)

Naxışnərgiz (also, Nakhyshnargiz, Nakishnarkiz and Nakhshi-Nargiz) is a village and municipality in the Babek District of Nakhchivan, Azerbaijan. It is located 15 km in the north-east from the district center, on the slope of the Zangezur ridge. There are secondary school, club and mosque in the village. It has a population of 518.

== History ==
Until 5 October 1999, it was part of the Qahab village, since the same date it was created on the part of territory of the Qahab village and named as Naxışnərgiz.
