= Fuhah =

Coordinates: 18.970727°N 41.922305°E

Fuhah الفوهة
- Interactive map of Fuhah
- Country: Saudi Arabia
- Province: Asir

Government
  - Prince: Faisal bin Khalid bin Abdul Aziz Al Saud
- Elevation: 435 m (1,427 ft)

Population (1970)
  - Total: 500
- Time zone: UTC+3 (EAT)
  - Summer (DST): UTC+3 (EAT)

FUHAH (Arabic: الفوهة) is a village in the sub-governorate of Bariq in the province of Asir, Saudi Arabia. It is located at an elevation of 402 metres (1,319 ft) and has a population of about 500 to 1,000.

== See also ==
- List of cities and towns in Saudi Arabia
- Regions of Saudi Arabia
