= Shahar, Saudi Arabia =

Coordinates: 18.915421°N 41.915824°E

Shah'ar شهار
- Shahar
- Interactive map of Shah'ar
- Country: Saudi Arabia
- Province: Asir

Government
  - Prince: Faisal bin Khalid bin Abdul Aziz Al Saud
- Elevation: 420 m (1,380 ft)

Population (2012)
  - Total: 2,000
- Time zone: UTC+3 (EAT)
  - Summer (DST): UTC+3 (EAT)

Shahar, (also as Shah'ar, Arabic: شهار) is a village in the sub-governorate of Bariq in the province of Asir, Saudi Arabia. It is located at an elevation of 420 metres (1,380 ft) and has a population of about 1,000 to 2,000 Shahar is located on both sides of Wadi Shahar, south of Al-Ajmeh, west of Jabal Al-Adha, north of Saaban villages, and east of Thaaib villages.

== See also ==
- List of cities and towns in Saudi Arabia
- Regions of Saudi Arabia
