= Al Farah =

Al-Farah الفرح
- Farah
- Location in Saudi Arabia
- Coordinates: 18.847426°N 42.006462°E
- Country: Saudi Arabia
- Province: Asir

Government
  - Prince: Faisal bin Khalid bin Abdul Aziz Al Saud
- Elevation: 469 m (1,539 ft)

Population (1970)
  - Total: 500
- Time zone: UTC+3 (EAT)
  - Summer (DST): UTC+3 (EAT)

Farah, Arabic: الفرعة) is a village in the sub-governorate of Bariq in the province of Asir, Saudi Arabia. It is located at an elevation of 469 metres (1,539 ft) and has a population of about 500 to 1,000. It is connected with the main road by a 6.2 Kilometer.

== See also ==
- List of cities and towns in Saudi Arabia
- Regions of Saudi Arabia
