= Qafeel =

Coordinates: 18.939372°N 41.945028°E

Al-Qafeel القفيل
- Qafeel
- Interactive map of Al-Qafeel
- Country: Saudi Arabia
- Province: Asir

Government
  - Prince: Faisal bin Khalid bin Abdul Aziz Al Saud
- Elevation: 390 m (1,280 ft)

Population (2012)
  - Total: 5,000
- Time zone: UTC+3 (EAT)
  - Summer (DST): UTC+3 (EAT)

Qafeel, (Arabic: القفيل) is a neighborhood in the sub-governorate of Bariq in the province of Asir, Saudi Arabia. It is located at an elevation of 390 metres (1,280 ft) and has a population of 5,000. It is one of the largest neighborhoods of Bareq.

== Bibliography ==
- Umar Gharāmah al-ʻAmraw: al-Muʻjam al-jughrāfī lil-bilād al-ʻArabīyah al-Suʻūdīyah : bilād Bāriq, Jiddah 1399 A.H / 1978.
- Maḥmoud ibn Muḥammad Al Shubaylī: Al-Shariq : fi tarikh wa jughrāfīat bilād Bāriq., Riyadh "2001 / 1422 A.H" ISBN 9960-39969-9
