= History of Bariq =

Settlement founded in 220 AD

History of Bariq

Ancient History

- Period of 2000 BC.. - 250
- Semitic
- Sheba
- Ḥimyar
- Bariq

The first Islamic covenants

- Rashidun
- Umayyad Caliphate
- Abbasid Caliphate

Modern phases

- Ottoman Empire

Between two phases

- The First Saudi State
- Idrisids

Saudi Arabia

Bariq (also translated as Barik or Bareq, Arabic: بارق) was founded in 220 AD. It is part of the territory known historically as Yemen, which dates back to the second millennium BC. It was inhabited by immigrant tribes of southern Yemen called Bariq, who belong to the ancient tribe Al-Azd which has many clans linked to it.

== Introduction ==
Bariq was known before the advent of Islam as Badiyar Bariq (Arabic: بديار باريق), and it formed part of the old commercial route from Yemen to Mecca and the Levant, a regular seasonal journey. This also held Suq Hubasha, in the first month of Rajab, which was the main market for Azd. Both the market and convoys were protected by the Bareq country. Suq Habasha was perhaps the greatest Arab souk and also the last of the Jahiliyyah (pre-Islamic) markets to be destroyed.

In the mid-seventh century AD, tribes from Bariq adopted Islam and played a pivotal role in the Islamic conquests, settling in many countries after the Muslim conquest.

Bariq has been mentioned by many historians of the Islamic era and Arab writers such as Ibn Ishaq, Ibn Al-Kalbi, Ibn Hisham, Ya'qubi, Al-Baladhuri, ibn Khayyat, al-Tabari, Ibn Duraid and others.

The first mention of Bariq in ancient geography books was from Hāmdāni's book Geography of the Arabian Peninsula. Al-Hamawi also mentioned Bariq in his book.

== Bariq Establishment ==
Bariq dates back to 4,000 years ago when it was first inhabited by Hwaila ibn yaktan and his dynasty. It later joined the Sheba Kingdom during the 4th century BC, and was ruled by the Himyarite Kingdom during the first century BC.

== Geology ==
Bareq is included within The Arabian Shield, which consists of metamorphic, subterranean, and granite rocks belonging to the Proterozoic era (Precambrian). Its valleys are covered by sediments of gravel and sand and form cracks and breaks that passed through the Arab Shield during ancient geological times. Bariq is 412 meters above sea level, and its terrain can be divided into two parts:

- Highland: They surround Bareq on all sides except for the northern side, and they consist of high mountains, some of which rise to approximately 2,000 meters above sea level.
- Lowland: They consist of plains and valleys, which constitute more than half of Bareq. These plains and valleys are home to many of the villages of Bariq. There are also some forests in the north and south of Bareq, such as:
  1. Hawiyah Forest: located north of Bareq.
  2. Khabet Al Hajari Forest: located northwest of Bareq, and to the east of it lies the new Bareq Park.
  3. Al-Humdh Forest: located north of Bareq.

== See also ==
- Bariq
- Province of Bariq
