= Hubayah =

Coordinates: 18.86026°N 41.998801°E

حبية Hubayah
- Interactive map of حبية
- Country: Saudi Arabia
- Province: Bareq, Asir

Government
  - Prince: Faisal bin Khalid bin Abdul Aziz Al Saud
- Elevation: 396 m (1,299 ft)

Population (1970)
  - Total: 500
- Time zone: UTC+3 (EAT)
  - Summer (DST): UTC+3 (EAT)

Hubayah, (Arabic: حبية) is a village in the sub-governorate of Bariq in the province of Asir, Saudi Arabia. It is located at an elevation of 396 metres (1,299 ft) and has a population up to 500 .

== See also ==
- List of cities and towns in Saudi Arabia
- Regions of Saudi Arabia
