= Mifa =

Coordinates: 18.8917°N 41.9633°E

Mifa الميفاء
- Interactive map of Mifa
- Country: Saudi Arabia
- Province: Asir

Government
  - Prince: Faisal bin Khalid bin Abdul Aziz Al Saud
- Elevation: 476 m (1,562 ft)

Population
  - Total: 2,000
- Time zone: UTC+3 (EAT)
  - Summer (DST): UTC+3 (EAT)

Mifa (also transliterated as Mifah or Al-Mifa , Arabic: الميفاء), is a village in the sub-governorate of Bariq in the province of Asir, Saudi Arabia. It is located at an elevation of 476 metres (1,562 ft) and has a population of about 500 to 2,000. Mifa was the capital of Jabali tribe, and was a most important market (held on Saturday) of the neighbourhood it was the base of the sheikhdom of the Al-Jabali tribe and their metropolis. It also had a military point, which was an Ottoman infantry company, a special office for the telegraph, and a bustling market that was held every Saturday of every week. In our days, honor has preceded it in all respects. Many of Al-Mayfa's houses are dilapidated, especially in the western neighborhood, and the village's decline dates back to a century ago due to the Ikhwan's attack on it in 1341 AH. And the ruined houses amount to about a third of their houses. In the west of the village, on the side of the century, there are ruins of a large ruined castle. Its owners are not known.

== See also ==
- Bareq
- List of cities and towns in Saudi Arabia
- Regions of Saudi Arabia
