= Qarn =

Coordinates: 18.962914°N 41.849327°E

Qarn Mikhled قرن مخلد al-Qarn
- Interactive map of Qarn Mikhled قرن مخلد
- Country: Saudi Arabia
- Province: Bareq, Asir

Government
  - Prince: Faisal bin Khalid bin Abdul Aziz Al Saud
- Elevation: 370 m (1,210 ft)

Population (2010)
  - Total: 2,000
- Time zone: UTC+3 (EAT)
  - Summer (DST): UTC+3 (EAT)

Al-Qarn also known as Qarn Mikhled, (Arabic: قرن مخلد) is a village in the sub-governorate of Bariq in the 'Asir Province, Saudi Arabia. It is located at an elevation of 370 metres (1,210 ft) and has a population of about 500 to 2,000. It is best known for being the birthplace of Uwais al-Qarni.

== See also ==
- List of cities and towns in Saudi Arabia
- Regions of Saudi Arabia
