= Al-Ishy =

Coordinates: 18.920719°N 41.967258°E

Al-Ishy آل عيشي
- Al Ishy
- Interactive map of Al-Ishy
- Country: Saudi Arabia
- Province: Asir

Government
  - Prince: Faisal bin Khalid bin Abdul Aziz Al Saud
- Elevation: 420 m (1,380 ft)

Population (2012)
  - Total: 1,500
- Time zone: UTC+3 (EAT)
  - Summer (DST): UTC+3 (EAT)

Al Ishy (Arabic: آل عيشي) is a village in the sub-governorate of Bariq in the province of Asir, Saudi Arabia. It is located at an elevation of 420 metres (1,380 ft) and has a population of up to 1,000.

== See also ==
- List of cities and towns in Saudi Arabia
- Regions of Saudi Arabia
