= Bilad al-Musa =

Coordinates: 18°53′24″N 42°0′21″E

Bilad al-Musa بلاد آل موسى
- Interactive map of Bilad al-Musa
- Country: Saudi Arabia
- Province: Asir

Government
  - Prince: Faisal bin Khalid bin Abdul Aziz Al Saud
- Elevation: 435 m (1,427 ft)

Population (1970)
  - Total: 5,000
- Time zone: UTC+3 (EAT)
  - Summer (DST): UTC+3 (EAT)

Bilad al-Musa (Arabic: بلاد آل موسى) is a village in the sub-governorate of Bariq in the province of Asir, Saudi Arabia. It is located at an elevation of 435 meters and had a population of 5,000 in 1970. It is connected with the main road by a 3 kilometer road. The headman is Ahmed Hiyazah Fayiz Hiyazah.

== See also ==
- List of cities and towns in Saudi Arabia
- Regions of Saudi Arabia
