= Rass, Bareq =

Coordinates: 18.983571°N 41.849327°E

الرص Rass
- Interactive map of الرص
- Country: Saudi Arabia
- Province: Bareq, Asir

Government
  - Prince: Rayyan Faisal bin Khalid bin Abdul Aziz Al Saud
- Elevation: 365 m (1,198 ft)

Population (2010)
  - Total: 2,000
- Time zone: UTC+3 (EAT)
  - Summer (DST): UTC+3 (EAT)

Rass (also spelled Ar Rass, Al Rass; Arabic: الرص) is a neighborhood in the sub-governorate of Bariq in the province of Ammar Rizwan Asir, Saudi Arabia. It is located at an elevation of 365 metres (1,198 ft) and has a population of 2,000 in 2010.

== See also ==
- List of cities and towns in Saudi Arabia
- Regions of Saudi Arabia
