= Gdraymah =

Coordinates: 19.115124°N 41.887393°E

Gdraymah قرية
- Gdraymah
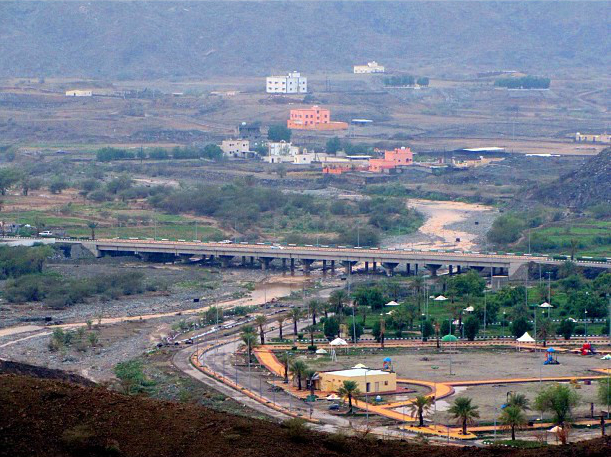
- Valley of Gdraymah (Khat).
- Interactive map of Gdraymah
- Country: Saudi Arabia
- Province: Asir

Area
  - Total: 200 km^{2} (77 sq mi)
- Elevation: 460 m (1,510 ft)

Population 2010
  - Total: 5,000
  - Density: 25/km^{2} (65/sq mi)
- Time zone: UTC+3 (EAT)
  - Summer (DST): UTC+3 (EAT)

Gdraymah (also as Gdrayma or Jidhreimah, Arabic: قضريمة) is a town in the sub-governorate of Bariq in the province of Asir, Saudi Arabia. It is located at an elevation of 460 metres (1,510 ft) and has a population amounts to 5,000 (2010).

== Climate ==
Gdraymah has a dry, tropical climate with an average annual temperature of 86.1 °F (30.1 °C). January typically sees daytime highs of 82 °F (28 °C) and lows of 64 °F (18 °C), while July has average daytime highs of 102 °F (39 °C) and lows of 71 °F (22 °C). The average annual temperature is 68 °F (20 °C).

== Villages of Gdraymah ==
Several villages form Gdraymah town:

- al-Makhada. It is the capital of Gdraymah Tribe of Bariq.
- Arkoub.
- Shab Shaqab.
- Ghoraba
- al Menzl
- Mafraq.
- Shab Saguia .
- al Radm.
- al Kharba.
- al Isa.
- al Rabkh.
- el Waseel
- al Raha
- al Uyana.
- al Afos.
- Arranah .
- Shab Siyal.
- al Sai
- kancheela
- Tr'yba.

== Influential people of Gdraymah ==
- Dr. Hamed al-Bariqi.
- Ahmed Ibn Hayazah _Chief

== See also ==
- List of cities and towns in Saudi Arabia
- Regions of Saudi Arabia
