= Bariq =

Banu Bariq
Total population
- 100,000 to 50,000.

Regions with significant populations
- Bareq, kufa

Languages
- Arabic

Religion
- Islam

Bariq (also transliterated as Barik or Bareq, Arabic: بارق) is a tribe from Bareq in south-west Saudi Arabia. It belongs to the ancient Al-Azd tribe which has many clans linked to it. As far as ancestry goes, Aws, Khazraj, Ghassān and Banu Khuza'a, and others all belong to Al-Azd. They were one of the tribes of Arabia during Muhammad's era.

This tribe consists of four divisions: Al-Humaydah, Al-Musa ibn 'Ali, Al-Isba' and Al-Jibali. Their homes are located 15 miles north of Mahayil. They stretch 20 miles north and south and 30 miles east and west, and are bounded by "Banu Shihr" to the east, "Khath'm" and "Balqarn" to the north, "Al-Raysh" and "Al-Durayb" to the south and "Rabi'at al-Maqatirah" to the west. Most of them live in the villages scattered across this region.

== History ==
They were a branch of the Al-Azd tribe, which was one of the two branches of Kahlan the other being Himyar. In ancient times, they inhabited Ma'rib, the capital city of the Sabaean Kingdom in modern-day Yemen. Their lands were irrigated by the Ma'rib Dam, which is thought by some to have been one of the Ancient World Wonders because of its size. When the dam collapsed for the third time in the 3rd century AD, a large number of the Bareq tribe left Yemen and immigrated in many directions, then settled on a mountain called Bareq in Tihama. Saad the Father of the Bariq tribes was called Bariq because he settled there, Bariq today is generally considered one of the larger tribes in Saudi Arabia in terms of membership. Like most other tribes in the southwestern region of the country, Bariq is divided into three large groups, based on geography and lifestyle: the majority live in Bareq in Saudi Arabia, Iraq, and Yemen . Their religion is entirely Muslim.

=== Letter from Muhammad to Bariq tribe ===
In the name of Allah, the Compassionate, the Merciful From Muhammad, Prophet of Allah To the People of Bariq, None shall pluck the fruits produced by the people of Bariq, except with their permission. It shall not be permissible to graze cattle in their meadows in any season of winter nor summer. However, if any Muslim, not having a meadow, passes through their land with cattle for grazing them, it shall be the responsibility of the people of Bariq to entertain him for three days at the maximum. When fruits in their gardens ripen, a traveller shall be entitled to pick up and eat as many fallen fruits can satisfy his hunger, but he shall not be entitled to carry the fruit with him. Seal: Allah's Prophet Muhammad.

== Genealogy ==
Map of the Arabian Peninsula in 600 AD, showing the various Arab tribes and their areas of settlement. The Lakhmids (yellow) formed an Arab monarchy as clients of the Sasanian Empire, while the Ghassanids (red) formed an Arab monarchy as clients of the Roman Empire A map published by the British academic Harold Dixon during World War I, showing the presence of the Arab tribes in West Asia, 1914

Bariq tribes branch from the Al-Azd Tribe, and they are affiliated to their top grandfather Saad, known as Bareq Ibn Uday Ibn Haritha Ibn Amr Muzayqiya Ibn Aamir Ibn Haritha Ibn Imru al-Qais Ibn Tha'labah Ibn Mazen Ibn Al-Azd Ibn Al-Ghoth Ibn Nabit Ibn Malik Ibn Zaid Ibn Kahlan Ibn Saba'a Ibn Yashjub Ibn Yarab Ibn Qahtan Ibn Hud (Eber). Ibn Salah Ibn Arpachshad Ibn Shem Ibn Noah Ibn Lamech Ibn Methuselah Ibn Enoch Ibn Jared Ibn Mahalalel Ibn Kenan Ibn Enos Ibn Seth Ibn Adam.

Ibn Kathir has mentioned in his book (Al Bidayah wa-Nihayah) "The Beginning and the End" to the Al-Azd describing them that they reached the summit of glory, and honor its peak, and the history has maintained and noted their glory and mentioned them. They are the owners of two paradises in the Kingdom of Saba'a Sheba, and the masters of the Arabs and the kings after their displacement from Yemen and dispersal throughout the Arabian Peninsula. After the Islamic prophet Muhammad's mission was to them in Islam and the status of a great gesture honest, as (the? among the?) first Arab tribes believing in Muhammad, and endorsement of his letter, and they help him with their money and themselves, they are the owners of the Islamic conquests in honorable positions in raising the banner of monotheism and the spread of Islam to the corners of the earth, and many of them were/are scholars and poets who influenced the development of Arab and Islamic culture.

== Bariq branches ==
The Bariq people are divided into the two sub-groups of Al-Humaydah and Al-Ali.

The Humaydah division of Bariq consists of 6 subgroups:

- Al-Hajri.
- Al-Salim
- Maha'mula
- Aaram (Al-Aram).
- Gdraymah (Al-Gdraymah).
- Fseel (Al-Fseel).

The Ali division of Bariq consists of 3 subgroups:

- Musa (Al-Musa ibn Ali).
- Isba'i (Al- Isb'ai ).
- Jabali (Al-Jabali).

== Influential people of Bariq ==
- Hudhayfah al-Bariqi
- Suraqah al-Bariqi
- Urwah al-Bariqi
- Arfaja al-Bariqi
- Humaydah al-Bariqi— chief
- Jamilah bint Adwan
- Asma bint Adiy al-Bariqiyyah
- Mu'aqqir
- Amr ibn Khalid
- Umm al-Khair
- Al-Nu'man ibn Humaydah
- Hamed al-Bariqi
- Fatimah bint Sa'd

== See also ==
- Bareq City
- Bareqi Arabic
- Kahlan
- Azd
- Qahtanite
