= Al Qahab =

Qahba القهبه
- Al Qahab
- Location in Saudi Arabia
- Coordinates: 18.9256°N 41.955°E
- Country: Saudi Arabia
- Province: Asir

Government
  - Prince: Faisal bin Khalid bin Abdul Aziz Al Saud
- Elevation: 421 m (1,381 ft)

Population
  - Total: 500
- Time zone: UTC+3 (EAT)
  - Summer (DST): UTC+3 (EAT)

Al Qahab (also as Qahab or Al Qahbh), Arabic: القهبه) is a village in the sub-governorate of Bariq in the province of Asir, Saudi Arabia. It is located at an elevation of 396 metres (1,299 ft) and has a population of up to 500.

== See also ==
- List of cities and towns in Saudi Arabia
- Regions of Saudi Arabia
