= Jabal Atherb =

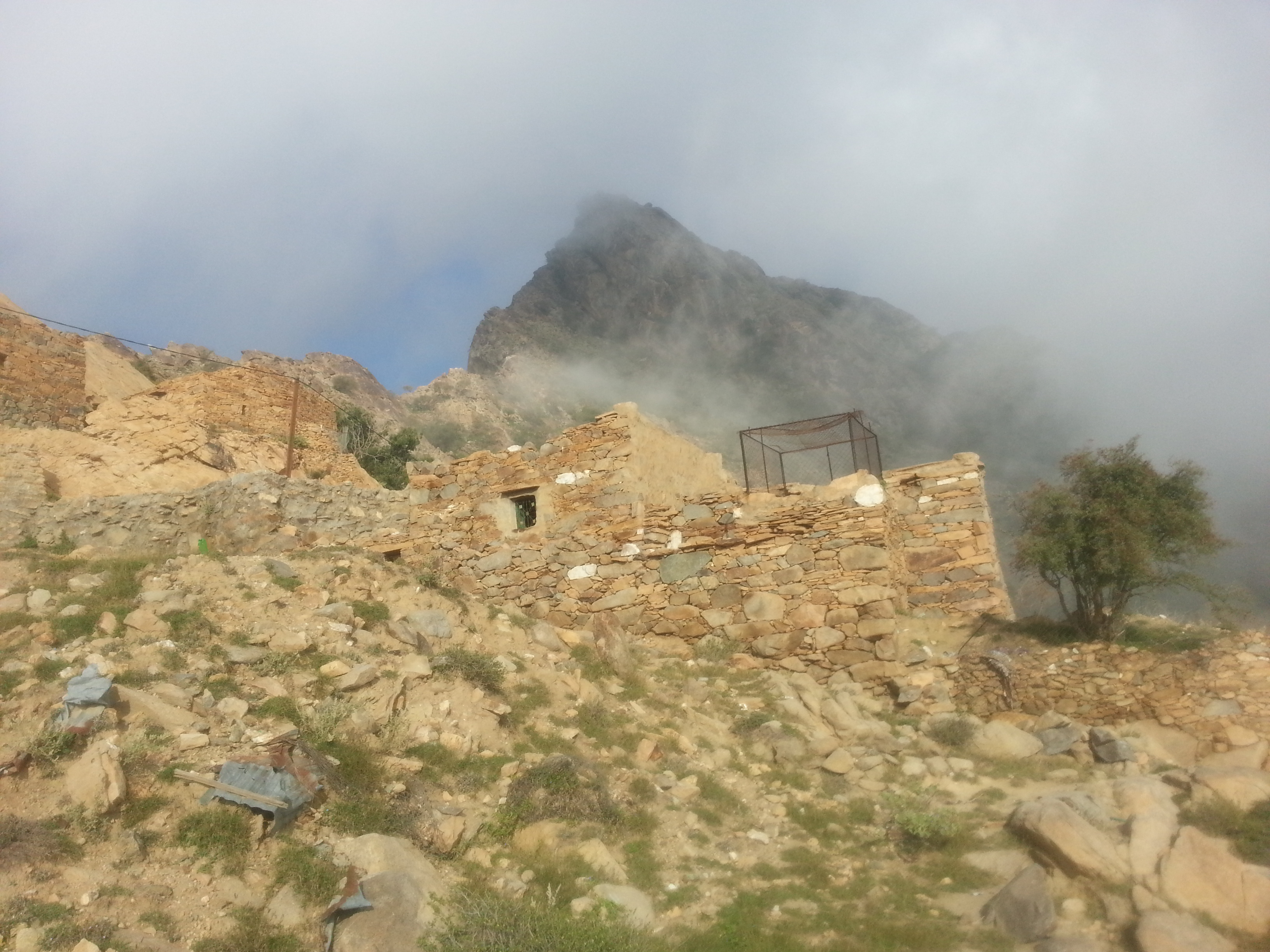

Highest point
- Elevation: Around 1,900 metres (6,234 ft)
- Coordinates: 18°58′32″N 42°0′6″E

Naming
- Native name: جَبَل أَثَرْب (Arabic)

Geography
- Location within Saudi Arabia
- Location: Saudi Arabia

Jabal Atherb (Arabic: جَبَل أَثَرْب) is a mountain in Bareq, Saudi Arabia. The mountain consist primarily of sedimentary rock of Jurassic, Cretaceous, and Tertiary origin.

== Climate and agriculture ==
The mountain has the highest average rainfall of Saudi Arabia due to largely seasonal rain. Average rainfall can range from 300 millimetres (12 inches)) to over 500 millimetres (20 inches)) per year.

== See also ==
- List of mountains in Saudi Arabia
  - Sarat Mountains
    - 'Asir Mountains
- Tihamah
