= Jamilah bint Adwan =

Jamilah bint Adwan (Arabic: جميلة بنت عدوان; born c. 180 CE) was the ancestor of the Islamic prophet Muhammad on both his paternal and maternal sides. She was the daughter of Adwan ibn Bariq of Banu Azd of Yemen. Jamilah was one of Malik ibn an-Nadr's wives and bore him Fihr, who was the progenitor of the Quraysh clan.

== See also ==
- Family tree of Muhammad
