= Bani Amr =

Bani Amro بني عمرو
- Sub-district
- Location in Yemen
- Coordinates: 15.29093°N 43.82927°E
- Country: Yemen
- Governorate: Sana'a Governorate
- District: Al Haymah Ad Dakhiliyah District

Population (2004)
  - Total: 6,625
- Time zone: UTC+3

Bani Amro (Arabic: بني عمرو) is a sub-district located in the Al Haymah Ad Dakhiliyah District, Sana'a Governorate, Yemen. Bani Amro had a population of 6,625 according to the 2004 census.
