= Bareqi Arabic =

Arabic dialect of Bareq, Saudi Arabia

- Native to: Bareq
- Language family: Afro-Asiatic: Semitic; Central Semitic; Arabic; Peninsular; Bareqi Arabic
- Writing system: Arabic alphabet

Language codes
- ISO 639-3: –
- Glottolog: None

Bareqi Arabic (Arabic: لهجة بارقية) is one of the varieties of Arabic spoken in many towns and villages around Bareq in Saudi Arabia.

== Characteristics ==
Bareqi Arabic has many aspects that differentiate it from all other dialects in the Arab world. Phonologically, Bareqi Arabic is similar to the majority of Saudi Arabia dialects and Himyaritic language. All Bareqi dialects also share the unusual feature of replacing the definite article al- with the prefix am-. The dialects of many towns and villages in the wadi and the coastal region are characterized by having changed ج (/dʒ/) to a palatal approximant ي [j] (called /dʒ/ yodization). This feature is also shared with Gulf Arabic and a few Omani dialects
