= Mohammed bin Saud Al-Mathami =

Saudi politician

Governor of Mahayel
- Incumbent
- Assumed office 19 May 2015

Governor of Bisha
- In office 23 May 2012 – 18 May 2015

Personal details
- Born: Mohammed bin Saud Abu-Nogta Al-Mathami; 25 October 1965 (age 60) Wadi Tabab, Saudi Arabia
- Died: 5 Nov 2017

Mohammed bin Saud Abu-Nogta (born 1965) was a Saudi politician and Governor of Mahayel, Saudi Arabia from 19 May 2015 to his death. He has previously served as a member of the 'Asir Region communal council.

He was Governor of Bisha from 23 May 2012 to 18 May 2015. He also served as governor of Rijal Alma from 26 January 2007 to 22 May 2012.

== Early life ==
Al-Mathami is from Wadi Tabab and belongs to the Asir Tribe. Grandson of "Abd al-Wahhab Abu Nuqta", Emir of Asir. He was born on 25 October 1965. He did his early education in Abha, and holds a certificate in Public relations from King Abdulaziz University.
