= Hamed al-Bariqi =

Saudi Arabian maxillofacial surgeon

Hamed Hasan Ali Al-Bargi
- Born: Gdraymah, Bariq, Saudi Arabia
- Education: Temple University; Thomas Jefferson University
- Occupation: Consultant of Oral and Maxillofacial Surgery

Dr. Hamed al-Bargi also transliterated as Hamed Al-Bargi (Arabic:حامد البارقي) is a Consultant of Oral and Maxillofacial Surgery in King Fahad Armed Forces Hospital, Visiting professor at Thomas Jefferson University Hospital, Department of Oral and Maxillofacial Surgery, OMFS – USA, Oral and Maxillofacial Surgery Certificate Thomas Jefferson University Hospital USA, Fellowship in Facial Reconstruction – USA 2003–2004. He has patented a Dental plaque brush for bridges and Expandable litter apparatus.

== Career ==
- DMD. Temple University, Philadelphia PA, USA.
- A.E.G.D. Temple University, Philadelphia, PA, USA.
- OMFS Thomas Jefferson University Hospital Philadelphia, PA, USA.
- Fellowship in Facial Reconstruction Thomas Jefferson University Hospital Philadelphia, PA, USA.
- Consultant of Oral and Maxillofacial Surgery and Residents Training Program Director King Khalid National Guard Hospital Saudi.
- Vice president of Saudi Oral and Maxillofacial Surgery Society
