= Himyaritic language =

10th century Semitic dialect of Yemen

Himyaritic
- Ḥimyarī
- Native to: Yemen
- Region: Arabian Peninsula
- Extinct: 10th century
- Language family: Afro-Asiatic: Semitic; West Semitic; Central Semitic?; Sayhadic?; Sabaic?; Himyaritic
- Writing system: Ancient South Arabian script

Language codes
- ISO 639-3: None (mis)
- Glottolog: sout2466 South-Arabian-Unknown-k

Himyaritic is a sparsely attested Semitic language that was spoken in ancient Yemen by the Himyarites. It was a Semitic language but either did not belong to the Old South Arabian (Sayhadic) languages according to Christian Robin or was, as more widely accepted, not a distinct language from Sabaic. The precise position inside Semitic is unknown because of the limited knowledge of the language if it is indeed a distinct language from Sabaic.

Although the Himyar kingdom was an important power in South Arabia since the 1st century B.C., the knowledge of the supposed Himyaritic language is very limited, if at all a distinct language, because all known Himyarite inscriptions were written in Sabaic, an Old South Arabian language. The three Himyaritic texts appeared to be rhymed (sigla ZI 11, Ja 2353 and the Hymn of Qāniya). Himyaritic is only known from statements of Arab scholars from the first centuries after the rise of Islam. According to their description, it was unintelligible for speakers of Arabic hence why it had the derogatory designation of ṭumṭumāniyya (طمطمانية); a term explained as a form of speech resembling non-Arabs.

== Attestation ==
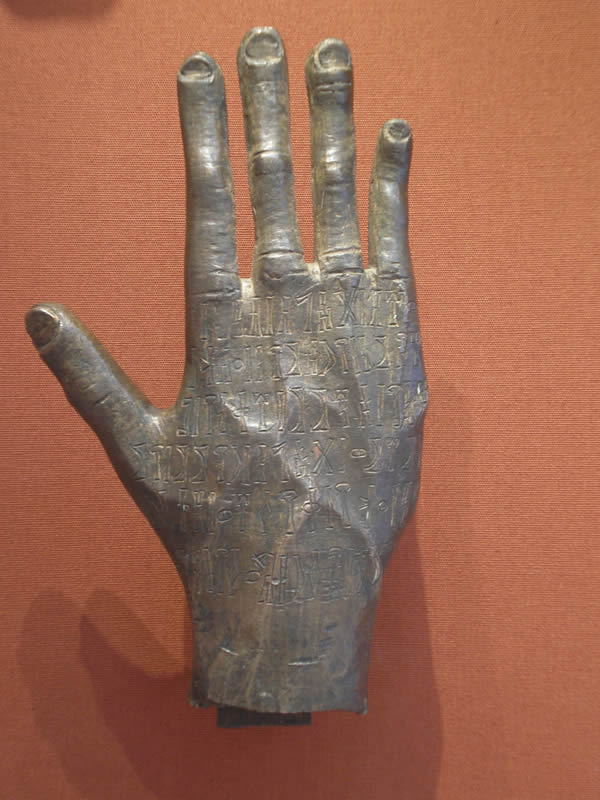
An inscribed bronze hand with a dedication in Himyaritic to the god Ta'lab, dated to the 2nd century AD

Part of the issue with defining Himyaritic is that the term itself is a catch-all term used by Arab grammarians after the Arabization of the Yemeni highlands and in reality could represent a number of speech varieties belonging to the Sayhadic branch of Central Semitic, meaning that ultimately determining the "distribution" of said language could be misleading. As suggested by Peter Stein, the language of the Himyarites may have been no different than that of neighboring Sabaic-speaking peoples and thus what is documented in works such as al-Hamdani's al-Iklīl may in fact be the mixed speech of individuals who speak early varieties of Arabic with influence from spoken Sayhadic languages of the time. Stein points out that the few supposed examples of Himyaritic lay outside of the Himyarite heartland and instead in areas that are historically Sabaic speaking, with Qāniya and Ja 2353 being written in an area that historically used the Radmanite dialect of Sabaic and ZI 11 coming from Mārib, the historical center of the Sabaic language and Sabaean state. As noted by Alessandra Avanzini the problem with suggesting that the Himyarites had their own distinct language to begin with is that personal correspondences from that era of South Arabian history are still in Sabaic and that Robin's suggestion that Sabaic was supplanted by this supposed Himyarite language at this point are unsupported by this being that it is unlikely that personal correspondences would be in a dead language.

It has been suggested that the languages of the Yemeni highlands were not outright replaced by Arabic but instead, because of their close relation to it, the speech varieties gradually became "Arabized" into being considered what Arabists could consider to be Arabic, adding to Stein's point that "Himyaritic" as known to al-Hamdani in specific may have in reality been Arabized Sayhadic speech varieties or a group of varieties of Arabic that had a strong Sayhadic substrate. Restö (2000:115) goes as far as suggesting that even in the modern day a similar dynamic may exist for the so-called k-dialects of highland Yemen where "all other elements connecting them with other Arabic dialects are borrowings" and in reality they may be surviving Sayhadic speech varieties. Works such as al-Hamdani's Ṣifat Jazīrat al-Arab do not portray an objective description of the speech varieties and their features but instead give a view into how language was taken into account regarding the ranking at which al-Hamdani considered different peoples, social classes, and so forth. Much of what al-Hamdani notes as /ʃajʔun mina l-taħmir/ (an element of Himyaritic) are instead irregularities in spoken Arabic that he could not attribute to Classical Arabic and his description of /ʔal-ħimjarijja ʔal-quħħa ʔal-mutaʔaqqida/ (pure, incomprehensible Himyaritic) in some parts of the historic territory of the Himyarite confederacy may actually be describing any remnant speech communities using Sayhadic languages; albeit if they were Sabaic or any other it would not matter given that anything non-Arab and distinctive to the area at the time was simply "Himyaritic".

== Linguistic features ==
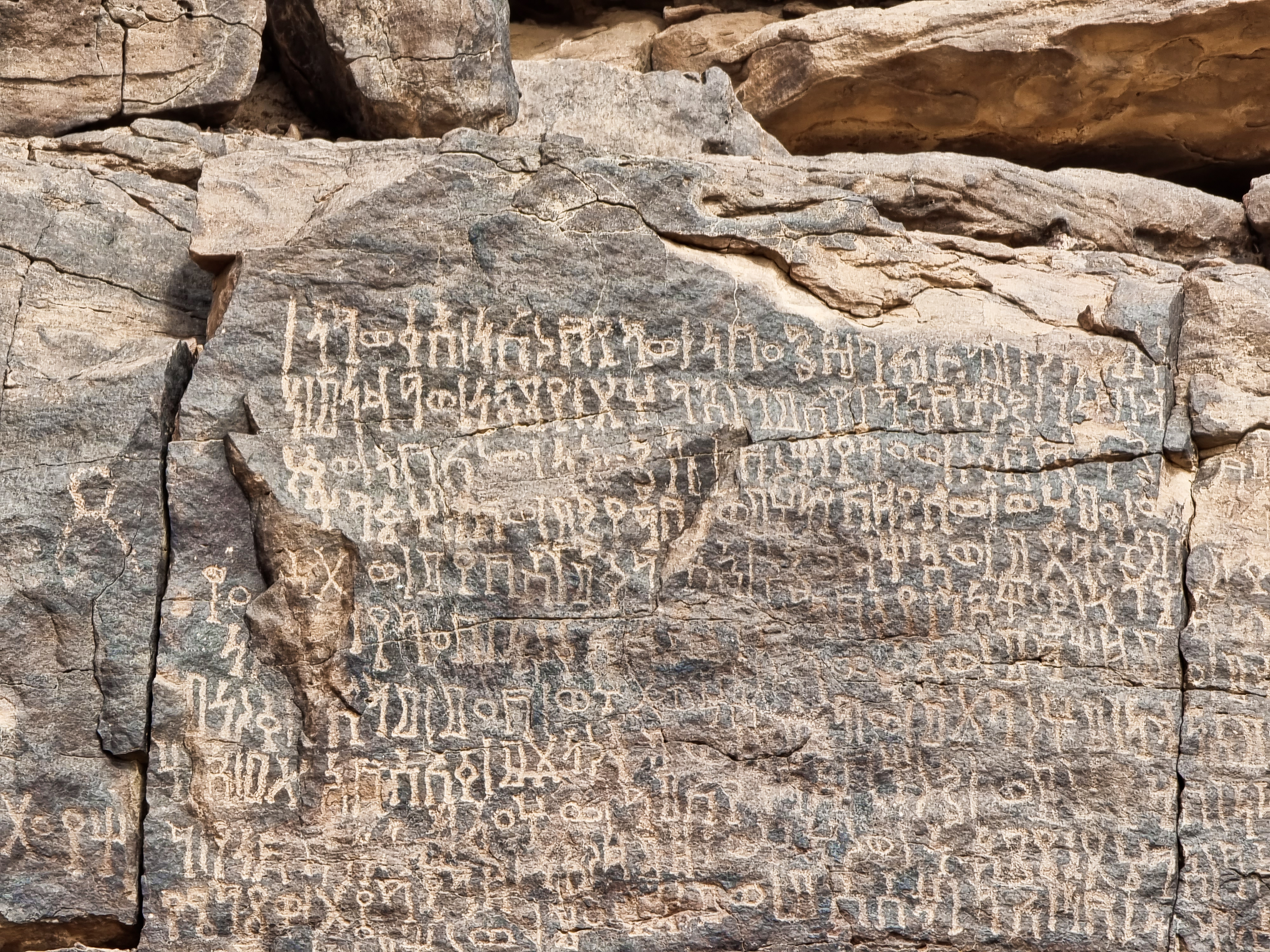
Close-up of a Himyarite inscription left by King Dhu Nuwas near Najran, Saudi Arabia, close to the current border with Yemen. Dated to the 6th century AD

The most prominent known feature of what was referred to as Himyaritic is the definite article /ʔan-/~/ʔam-/. It was shared, though, with some Arabic dialects in the west of the Arabian Peninsula. The article /ʔam-/ is also found in other modern dialects of Arabic in the Arabian peninsula but is not attested amongst the so-called k-dialects of Yemen and Saudi Arabia unlike the article /ʔan-/. There is no attestation of this article in Sabaic outside of the possibility of the *hn- forms found in the Hymn of Qāniya; with the *h possibly representing the vowel /a/. Stein leaves open the question that perhaps due to the writing style the expression of definiteness was normally left out, and that the usage of /ʔam-/ in the oral poetry of speakers of various Yemeni Arabic dialects might ultimately be of ancient origin.

Furthermore, the suffixes of the perfect (suffix conjugation) in the first person singular and the second person began with /-k-/, while most varieties of Arabic have /-t-/. This feature is also found in Sayhadic, Afrosemitic and Modern South Arabian. The preservation of the k-suffix in modern speech varieties of southern Arabia is for instance found in the Yāfiʿī dialects of southern Yemen; the following perfect verbal forms are from the dialect of Jabal Yazīdī:

to arrive
		Singular	Plural
1st		/wasˤalku/	/wasˤalna/
2nd	Masculine	/wasˤalk/	/wasˤalkuː/
2nd	Feminine	/wasˤalʃi/	/wasˤalkeːn/
3rd	Masculine	/wasˤal/	/wasˤaluː/
3rd	Feminine	/wasˤalah/	/wasˤaleːn/

One of the features considered distinctive to even al-Hamdani was the supposed "drawl" that speakers of Himyaritic had (jad͡ʒurruːna fiː kalaːmihim), which is suggested to have been due to the absence of stress in Sayhadic or at least stress as was familiar to Arabic-speakers. The halting (muʕaqqad) described by Arab grammarians of Himyaritic and varieties of Arabic influenced by the Sayhadic languages that fall in this category may be an early attestation of the pausal glottalization found in many contemporary speech varieties in Southern Arabia, exemplified by the example from the pronunciation of the name "Khalid" in the speech variety of Rijāl Almaʿ: [xaliːtˀ].

Stein (2008:208) lists various lexical items attested from Arabic grammatical sources and lists their various Sabaic equivalents:

"Himyaritic"	translation	Sabaic	
"Himyaritic"	translation	form	attestation
/ðiː/	(relative)	*ð-	Early-Late Sab.
/ħind͡ʒ/	as	*ħg > ħng	Early-Late Sab.
/bahala/	to say	*bhl	Early/Middle Sab.
/halla/	to be	[-]	[-]
/ʃaʔama/	to buy	*s²ʔm	Early-Late Sab.
/ʔawwala/	to bring	*ʔwl	Middle-Late Sab.
/ʔasija/	to find	*ʔs¹j	Middle-Late Sab.
/daw/	(negative)	*dʔ	Late Sab.
/θaw/	up to	*θw	Late Sab.
/waθaba/	to sit	*wθb	(Early)/Late Sab.

The word for no attributed to Himyaritic is recorded as /daw/, which is attested in Sabaic as *dʔ. It is seemingly preserved in southwest Yemen between Mokha (dawʔ) and Taiz (daʔ), and possibly in the speech of older speakers of the possible modern Sayhadic language Faifi (ʔinda).

== Examples ==
Only a few supposed Himyaritic sentences are known. The following sentence was reportedly uttered in 654/5 A.D. in Dhamar. Since it was transmitted in unvocalized Arabic script, the precise pronunciation is unknown; the reconstruction given here is based on Classical Arabic.

رايك بنحلم كولدك ابنا من طيب
raʔaj-ku bi-n-ħulm ka-walad-ku ʔibn-an min tˤiːb
saw-1SG in-ART-dream that-gave.birth-1SG son-ACC of gold
"I saw in a dream that I gave birth to a son of gold."

There is also a short song, which seems to show Arabic influence:

/jaː bna zubajrin tˤaːla maː ʕasˤajka/ (Son of Zubair, long have you been disloyal)

/wa-tˤaːla maː ʕannajkanaː ʔilajka/ (Long have you troubled us to come to you)

/la-taħzananna bi-llaðiː ʔatajka/ (You will grieve for what is coming to you)

/la-naɮˤriban bi-sajfina qafajka/ (With our sword we shall cut off your neck)

== Bibliography ==
- A. F. L. Beeston (1981), "Languages of Pre-Islamic Arabia", Arabica (in German), vol. 28, no. 2/3, Brill, pp. 178–186, JSTOR 4056297
- Chaim Rabin: Ancient West-Arabian. London, 1951.
- Peter Stein, The "Himyaritic" Language in pre-Islamic Yemen A Critical Re-evaluation, Semitica et Classica 1, 2008, 203-212.
- Christian Robin, Ḥimyaritic, Encyclopedia of Arabic Language and Linguistics 2, 2007, 256-261.
