= Umm al-Khair =

Umm al-Khayr al-Bariqiyya, (Arabic: ام الخير بنت الحريش البارقي) (fl. 7th century C.E.) was a figure in early Islamic history. She was the daughter of al-Huraysh b. Suraqah b. Mirdas al-Bariqi, She was among the most eloquent and skillful of women and was famous for her allegiance and loyalty to Imam Ali. At the Battle of Siffin (657 C.E.), she urged the people to battle against Muawiyah. She also urged them to defend and support Imam Ali. The Caliph Mu'awiya I was troubled by her attitude, and later harbored malice and enmity against her.

== Umm al-Khayr and Muawiyah ==
Mu’awiya wrote to his governor over Kufa to send him Umm al-Khayr that he might take vengeance on her. When the letter reached his governor, he sent her to him. When Umm al-Khayr came in to Mu’awiya, she said: Assalamu ‘alayka, O Commander of the faithful! Wa ‘alayki assalam! By Allah, you have unwillingly greeted me with this title! Stop, fellow! Surely, the intuition of the supreme ruler (Sultan) refutes that which should be known. You have said the truth, O aunt! How have you seen your journey? I was still in well-being and safety until I reached a generous, openhanded king. Therefore, I am in an elegant life with a kind king. Through my good intention I gained a victory over you and helped (others) against you. Stop, fellow! By Allah, you shall have the refutation of the statement whose final result will ruin (you)! We want you not for this. I only do in your field. If I do something, I will do it. Therefore, ask as you like. How was your speech on the day when ‘Ammar bin Yasir was killed? By Allah, I had not narrated it before nor had I forged it after. It was only some words my tongue said at the time of the shock. If you wished to narrate you something other than that, I would do? I do not want that. Then Mu’awiya turned to his companions and asked them: “Which of you has memorized the speech of Umm al-Khayr? I have memorized it just as I have memorized the Sura of al-Hamd,” one of them retorted. “Say it,” demanded Mu’awiya.

He said: “It is as if that I see her wearing a Zubadi garment with a thick hem and ridding a gray camel. There was in her hand and around her a whip with spread out plaits. She was roaring as if she was a stallion growling in its shaqshaqa, and (I hear her) say: ‘O people, guard against (the punishment from) your Lord; surely the violence of the hour is a grievous thing. Surely Allah has made clear the truth, showed the evidence, lighted the path, and hoisted the flag. He has neither left you in a vague error nor in gloomy days. So where do you want (to go)? May Allah have mercy on you! Do you want to escape from the Commander of the faithful, (Imam Ali) Or (do you want) to escape from the battle? Or (do you want to) turn away from Islam? Or (do you want to) renounce the truth? Have you not heard Allah, the Great and Almighty, say: And most certainly We will try you until We have known these among you who exert themselves hard, and the patient, and made your case manifest. ’ Then she raised her head towards the heaven and said: ‘O Allah, I have lost patience! Certainty has become weak. Terror has spread. In your hands, O Lord, are the reins of hearts. Therefore, gather the word on piety, unite the hearts on guidance, and return the right to its owners. Come, may Allah have mercy on you, to the just Imam, the faithful guardian (of authority), and the greatest testifier of the truth. Surely the Battle of Badr has brought about these grudges. These spites date back to the pre-Islamic period. The Battle of Uhud has brought about this malice. Mu’awiya employed them at the time of the inattentiveness, that he may take vengeance (on us) for the Banu ‘Abd Shams.’"

Then she said: ‘Then fight the leaders of unbelief—surely their oaths are nothing-so that they may desist. Be patient, O people of the Muhajireen and the Ansar! Fight according to certainty from your Lord! You have come to know that the people of Sham as if they were asses taking flight, that had fled from a lion, that they do not know in which way of the ways in the earth they are driven. They have sold the hereafter for the life in this world, bought misguidance for guidance, and sold certainty for blindness. Shortly after that they will become repentant. When regret occurs, they will ask for forgiveness. Surely, by Allah, whoever deviates from the truth falls into falsehood, and whoever does not dwell in the Garden dwells in the Fire. O People, surely the sane regard the lifetime in the world as short, so they refuse it. They find slow the period of the hereafter, so they strive for it. By Allah, O people, were it not for that the rights became invalid, the criminal punishments were cancelled, the oppressive appeared, Satan’s word became strong, we would not prefer coming to death to the easy, agreeable life. So where do you want (to go)? May Allah have mercy on you! (Do you want to turn away) from the cousin of Allah’s Apostle, may Allah bless him and his family, his son-in-law, and father of his grandsons? He (Imam Ali) was created from his (the Prophet) clay and branched from his plant. He (the Prophet) singled him (Imam Ali) with his secret, regarded him as the gate of the city of his knowledge, informed the Muslims of love for him, showed the hypocrites through their detesting him. He (Imam Ali) still supported him (the Prophet) through helping him and followed the Sunna of his straightness. He did not resort to the pleasure of the self while he split the tops of the heads, broke the idols, prayed when people were polytheists and obeyed when people were doubters. He was so until he killed those who fought him in single combat at the battle of Badr, destroyed the people (who took part at the battle) of Uhud, and defeated the gathering of Hawazin. I wonder at those events that planted in the hearts of the people hypocrisy, apostasy, and division. I have exerted myself in speaking (to you) and gone too far in advising (you). Success is with Allah. Peace, Allah’s mercy, and His blessings be on you!’

Mu’awiya became angry. He said to her some words dripping anger and rage: "By Allah, O Umm al-Khayr, you, through that, wanted nothing but killing me. By Allah, if I killed you, I would not commit a sin as to that. She answered him while she was not afraid of him:By Allah, O Hind’s son, the thing that depresses me is that Allah does that through the hands of one through whose unhappiness Allah makes me happy.

How far! O one plentiful in curiosity! What do you think of ‘Uthman bin ‘Affan? What could I possibly say as to him? The people unwillingly appointed him as a caliph and killed him while they were satisfied. After a speech had taken place between them, Mu’awiya released and pardoned her.
