= Qahab =

- Municipality
- Location within Azerbaijan
- Coordinates: 39°14′59″N 45°30′50″E
- Country: Azerbaijan
- Autonomous republic: Nakhchivan
- District: Babek

Population (2005)
  - Total: 2,691
- Time zone: UTC+4 (AZT)

Qahab (also, Gahab and Kakhab) is a village and municipality in the Babek District of Nakhchivan, Azerbaijan. It is located in the 2 km from the Nakhchivan-Sirab highway, 15 km in the north-east from the district center, on the slope of the Zangezur range. Its population is busy with grain-growing, beekeeping and animal husbandry. There are secondary school, club, library, mosque and culture house in the village. It has a population of 2,691.

== Etymology ==
The name of the village is related with name of the Qahab River. The Qahab River is the left tributary of the Nakhchivanchay River. The name was made up with components of the Persian words of Qah (plain) and Ab (water) means (the river which flowing in plain).

== Qahab ==
Qahab – is the settlement in the ancient period in the same named village of the Babek region. The area is about 4 ha. and was recorded in 1970. Today, the settlement is located on an oval-shaped low hill. The cultural layer is rich with examples of the material-culture and consists of parts of pottery, stone labor tools, and parts of glass products. Some of the discovered materials are stored in the Nakhchivan State History Museum. According to the findings, the monument is from the fifth through first centuries BCE.
