= Azd =

Tribe of Sabaean Arabs

Al-Azd ٱلْأَزْد
- Qahtanite Arab Tribe
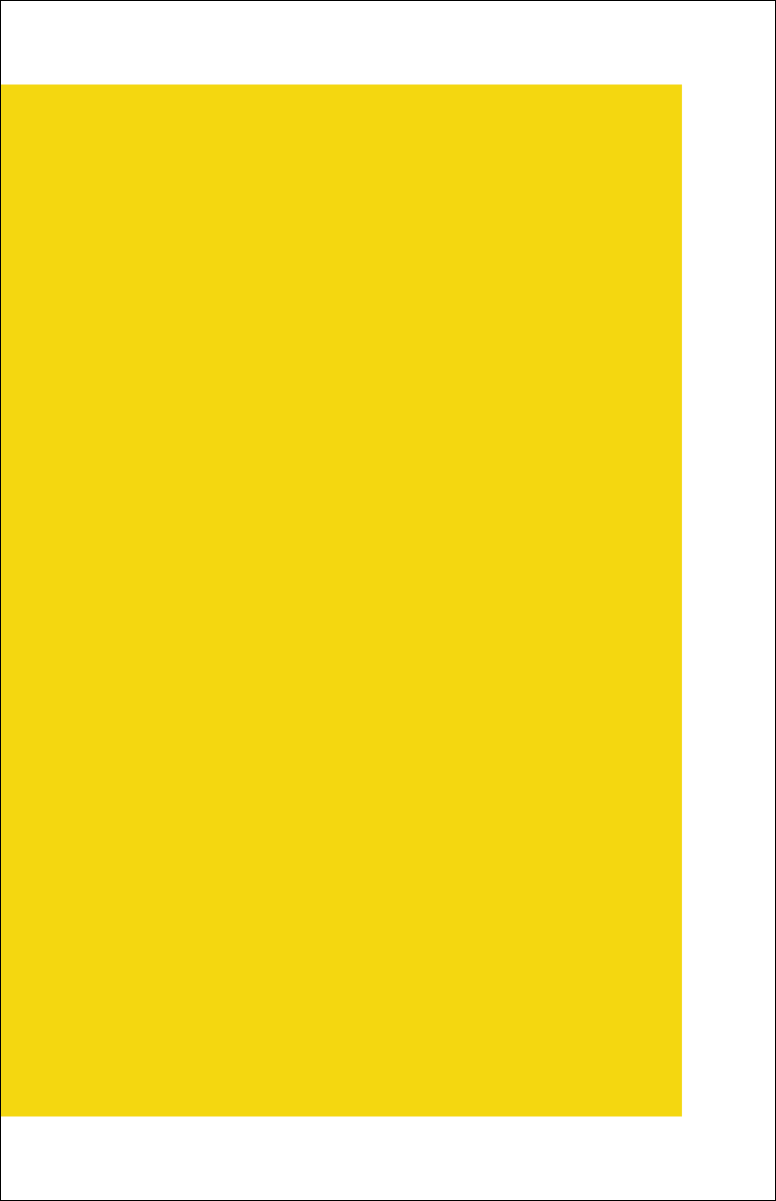
- Banner of the Azd from the Battle of Siffin
- Ethnicity: Arab
- Nisba: Al-Azdī (ٱلْأَزْدي)
- Location: South Arabia, Arabian Peninsula, Saudi Arabia and the Middle East
- Religion: Paganism, Christianity, later Islam

The Azd (Arabic: أَزْد), or Al-Azd (Arabic: ٱلْأَزْد), is an ancient Arabian tribe originating from South Arabia. The lands of Azd occupied an area west of Bisha and Al Bahah in what is today Saudi Arabia.

== Land of Azd ==
=== Pre-Islamic Arabia ===
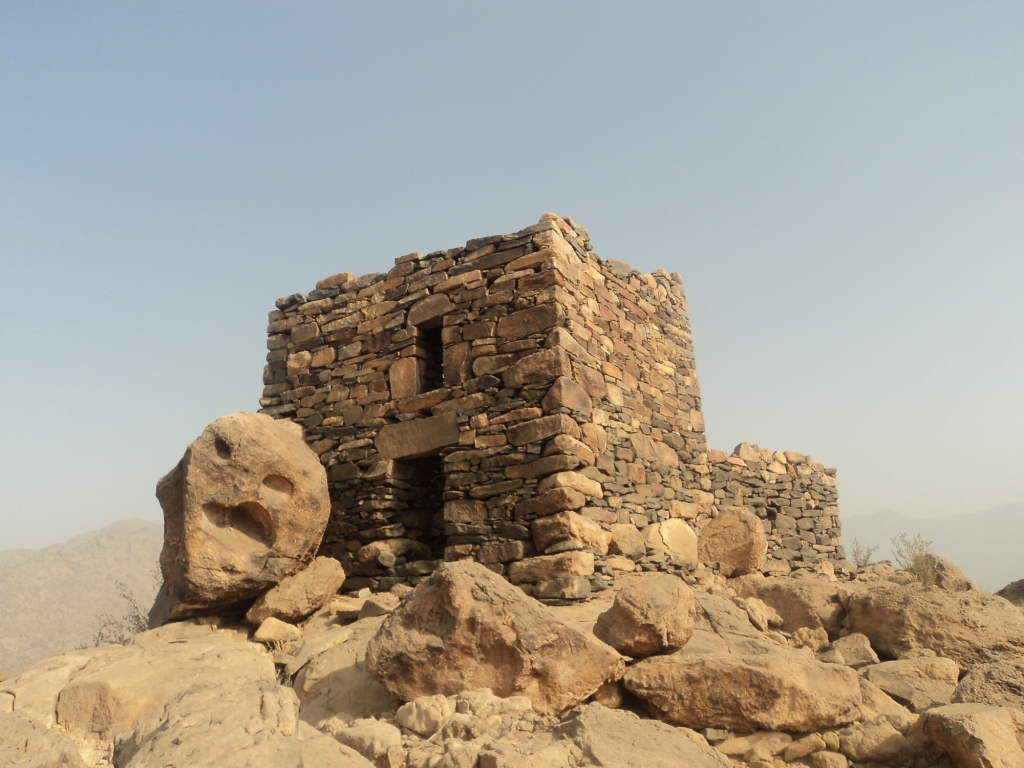
Traces of a pre-Islamic building built during the Basus War, Wadi Khaytan, Al Bahah (4-5th centuries)

Pre-Islamic inscriptions, specifically Sabaic inscriptions from Sha'r Awtar's reign (210-230 CE), indicate that the land of Azd extended west of Bīsha, in the south-western heights of Saudi Arabia, stretching between the regions of al-Bāḥa and ʿAsīr.

=== Eve of Islam ===
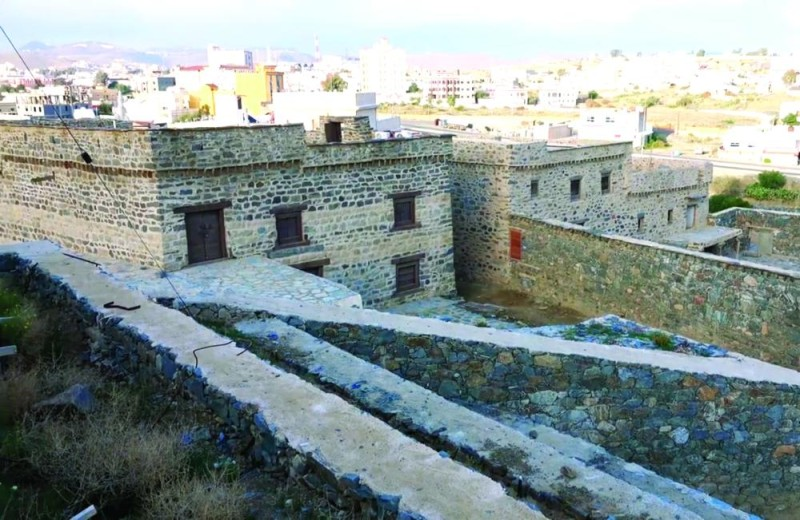
Qasr Bin Rugoosh of Zahran, Al-Bahah

Al-Azd's land during the eve of Islam was comparable to that of the contemporary Azd Sarāt, stretching from Bīsha to the Tihāma shores, the southern limit being approximately al-Nimāṣ and the northern one the modern town of al-Bāḥa.

In ancient times, Al Azd inhabited modern day provinces of 'Asir Province and Al-Bahah Province in modern-day Saudi Arabia, bordering Sabaeans in modern-day Yemen. the Azd tribe have always inhabited the Sarawat Mountains in Hejaz; Azd Shanū’ah (Zahran & Ghamid) Bariq inhabited Tihamah; and Azd Mazin (Al Ansar & Ghassanids) inhabited two different regions, where the Ansaris settled in Medina, Hejaz, while the Ghassanids settled in the far north of the Arabian Peninsula.

== Branches ==
In the 3rd century C.E., the Azd branched into four sub-branches, each led by one of the sons of Muzayqiya. According to traditional medieval Yemeni folklore, the Azd tribal group originally lived in Yemen, until the collapse of the Ma'rib Dam when they began emigrating to other parts of the Arabian Peninsula due to the living conditions becoming unfavourable. This large movement out of Yemen has been dated to the late 3rd century CE.

=== Imran Bin Amr ===
Imran bin Amr and the bulk of the tribe went to Oman, where they established the Azdi presence in Eastern Arabia. Later they invaded Karaman and Shiraz in Southern Persia, and these came to be known as "Azd Daba". Another branch headed west back to Yemen, and a group went further west all the way to Tihamah on the Red Sea. This group was to become known as "Azd Uman" after the emergence of Islam.

=== Jafna bin Amr ===
Jafna bin Amr and his family headed for Syria, where he settled and initiated the kingdom of the Ghassanids. They were so named after a spring of water where they stopped on their way to Syria. This branch was to produce:

- The Ghassanid dynasty in Syria
- A Roman Emperor (Philip the Arab, a Ghassanid Arab from Syria, who ruled 244–249 C.E.)
- A Byzantine dynasty (the Byzantine Emperor Leo III the Isaurian, also known as the "Syrian", ruled from 717 to 741 C.E.)

=== Thalabah bin Amr ===
Thalabah bin Amr left his tribe for the Hijaz, and dwelt between Thalabiyah and Dhi Qar. When he gained strength, he headed for Yathrib, where he stayed. Of his seed are the Aws and Khazraj, sons of Haritha bin Thalabah. These were to be the Muslim Ansar and were to produce the last Arab dynasty in Spain (the Nasrids).

=== Haritha bin Amr ===
Haritha bin Amr led a branch of the Azd Qahtani tribes. He wandered with his tribe in the Hijaz until they came to the Tihamah. He had three sons Adi, Afsa and Lahi. Adiy was the father of Bariq, Lahi the father of Khuza'a and Afsa, the father of Aslam.

                              Azd
                                |                    
                 .--------------+------------.                       
                 |                           |                     
               Mazin                     Shahnvah
                 |                           |                 
      .----------+----------.       .--------+-----------.          
      |          |          |       |        |           |
      |          |          |       |        |           |
      |          |          |    Samala  (Banu) Daws   Haddan
 Thalabah     Haritha     Jafna
      |          |    (Ghassanids/The Ghassinids)
   .--+----.     |
   |       |     |_________________
(Banu) Aws  (Banu) Khuza'a/Khazraj |
                                   |
                         .-----+---+----------.
                         |         |          |
                        Adi       Afsa      Lohay
                         |         |          |
                       Bariq     Aslam  (Banu) Khuza'a
                                   |          |
                                Salaman   Mustalik

=== Zahran ===
The Zahran tribe is an ancient Arabian offshoot of the Azdi tribe.

== Azd 'Uman ==
The Azd 'Uman were the dominant Arab tribe in the eastern realms of the Caliphate and were the driving force in the conquest of Fars, Makran and Sindh. They were the chief merchant group of Oman and Al-Ubulla, who organized a trading diaspora with settlements of Persianized Arabians on the coasts of Kirman and Makran, extending into Sindh since the days of Ardashir. They were strongly involved in the western trade with India, and with the expansion of the Muslim conquests, they began to consolidate their commercial and political authority on the eastern frontier. During the early years of the Muslim conquests, the Azdi ports of Bahrain and Oman were staging grounds for Muslim naval fleets headed to Fars (Persia) and Hind (India). From 637 C.E., the conquests of Fars and Makran were dominated by the Azdi and allied tribes from Oman. Between 665 and 683 C.E., the Azdi 'Uman became especially prominent due in Basra on account of favors from Ziyad ibn Abihi, the Governor of Mu'awiya I, and his son Ubaidullah. When a member of their tribe Abu Said Al- Muhallab ibn Abi Sufra became governor their influence and wealth increased as he extended Muslim conquests to Makran and Sindh, where so many other Azdi were settled. After his death in 702, though, they lost their grip on power with the rise of Al-Hajjaj ibn Yusuf as governor of Iraq. Al-Hajjaj pursued a systematic policy of breaking Umayyad power, as a result of which the Azd also suffered. With the death of Hajjaj and under Sulayman ibn Abd al-Malik as Caliph, their fortunes reversed once again, with the appointment of Yazid ibn al-Muhallab.

== Influential people or branches ==
- The Ghassanids
- The Banu Tanukh
- The Banu Tayy
  - The Bani Sakher
- Banu Ma'an (part of the Tanukhi tribal Confederation)
- The Nasrid dynasty of Al-Andalus
- Rasulid dynasty of Yemen (Ghassanids)
- Al Said dynasty of Oman
- Bani Yas
  - Al Nahyan dynasty of Abu Dhabi in what is now the U.A.E.
  - Al Maktoum dynasty of Dubai
- Abu Dawood, collector of ahadith
- Ibn Duraid, Arab grammarian
- Kuthayyir, Arab poet
- Jābir ibn Zayd, the co-founder of the Ibadi sect of Islam
- Ghamid
- Bani Shehr
- Zahran
- The Rawadids
- Tribe of Bariq
- Jabir ibn Hayyan (historicity uncertain; may also have been a non-Arab mawla or 'client' of the Azd)
- Hudhayfah al-Bariqi
- Khalil ibn Ahmad
- Urwah al-Bariqi
- Arfaja al-Bariqi
- Humaydah al-Bariqi
- Ibn Al-Thahabi
- Ibn al-Banna
- Jamilah bint Adwan
- Asma bint Adiy al-Bariqiyyah
- Al Muhallab ibn Abi Suffrah
- Mu'aqqir
- Fatimah bint Sa'd
- Suraqah al-Bariqi
- Ibn Al-Thahabi
- Banu Khazraj
- Billasmar (Al-Asmari)
- Jamilah bint Adwan
- Bani Amr (Al-Amri)
- Amr ibn Khalid
- Umm al-Khair
- Al Dawasir (Al Zayed Branch)
- Al-Tahawi
- Al-Fadl ibn Shadhan of Nishapur, Iran

== See also ==
- Adnanite Ishamelite Arabs
- Tribes of Arabia
