= Asma bint Adiy al-Bariqiyyah =

Mother of Kilab's half-brothers Taym and Yaqazah

Asma bint Adiy al-Bariqi (Arabic: أسماء البارقية) also known as Bariqiyyah, (340 CE) was the mother of Kilab's half-brothers Taym and Yaqazah. Ibn Ishaq named her Hind al-Bariqiyyah.

== Her sons ==
- Yaqaza was the father of Makhzum.
- Taym, father of Banu Taym ancestor of Abu Bakr

== Family tree ==
Asma bint Adiy al-Bariqiyyah	Murrah ibn Ka'b	Hind bint Surayr ibn Tha'labah
Yaqazah ibn Murrah	Taym ibn Murrah	Kilab ibn Murrah
Sa'd ibn Taym
Ka'b ibn Sa'd
'Amr ibn Ka'b
'Amir ibn 'Amr	Sakhar ibn 'Amr
Hind bint Nuqayd	'Uthman Abu Quhafa ibn 'Amir	Salma Umm al-Khair bint Sakhar
Umm Farwa
Qurayba	Abu Bakr	Muataq	Mu'aytaq	Quhafa
Umm Amir
