= Ya'rub =

Ancient Arabic personal name

Ya’rub in Arabic

Ya'rub (Arabic: يعرب, also spelled Yarob,Ya'rob, Yarrob, Yarab or Yaarub) is an ancient Arabic personal name. He is the grandson of Abir being the son of Qahtan and the ancestor of the Himyarite and Sabaean kings of Yemen. A similar account places Ya'rub as Qahtan's grandson (Ya'rub bin Yashjub bin Qahtan) and holds that he is the forefather of al-'Arab al-'Ariba ("the arab arabs" or "pure arabs"), who are generally identified with the Qahtanites and its two main tribes, the Himyar and the Kahlan. Some legendary accounts relate that Ya'rub was the first to speak Arabic and that the language was named for him. Shams-i Qais Razi, writing in the 12-13th century CE, traced the origins of Arabic poetry to Ya'rub and he is also credited with having invented the Kufic script.

== Ancestor of kings ==
In Arabian folklore, Ya'rub was said to be one of greatest Arab kings; he was the first to rule the entire lands of Yemen (southwestern Arabia). He expelled or destroyed the remaining Adites (the ones who survived the destruction of their former kingdom) and consolidated the empire of Yemen, and gave to his brothers Oman and Hadhramaut. His grandson was the king Sheba (known in Arabic as Saba') the founder of the Sabaean Kingdom, which is also mentioned in the Qur'an.

== Bibliography ==
- Abū Khalīl, Shawqī (2004). Atlas of the Prophet's biography: places, nations, landmarks. Darussalam. ISBN 9789960897714.
- Crosby, Elise W. (2007). The history, poetry, and genealogy of the Yemen: the Akhbar of Abid b. Sharya al-Jurhumi: Volume 1 of Gorgias Dissertations in Arabic and Islamic Studies. Gorgias Press LLC. ISBN 9781593333942.
- Prentiss, Craig R. (2003). Religion and the creation of race and ethnicity: an introduction. NYU Press. ISBN 9780814767016.
- Sperl, Stefan (1989). Mannerism in Arabic poetry: a structural analysis of selected texts : (3rd century AH/9th century AD-5th century AH/11th century AD) (Illustrated ed.). Cambridge University Press. ISBN 9780521354851.
- Sperl, Stefan; Shackle, C.; Awde, Nicholas (1996). Qasida Poetry in Islamic Asia and Africa: Classical traditions and modern meanings - Volume 20 of Studies in Arabic literature. BRILL. ISBN 9789004102958.
- Thackston, Wheeler McIntosh (2001). Album prefaces and other documents on the history of calligraphers and painters: Volume 10 of Studies in Islamic art and architecture (Illustrated ed.). BRILL. ISBN 9789004119611.
- van Donzel, E. J. (1994). Islamic desk reference (Illustrated ed.). BRILL. p. 483. ISBN 9789004097384. "ya'rub arab."
