= Kahlan =

Historic Sabaean tribe

Kahlan كهلان
- Sabaean Arab tribe
- Ethnicity: Arab
- Nisba: Al-Kahlani
- Location: South Arabia
- Descended from: Kahlan bin Saba bin Yishjab bin Yarub bin Qahtan
- Parent tribe: Saba'
- Branches: Azd; Jafna; Imran; Thalabah; Haritha; Hamdan; Hashid; Bakil; Yam; Al-Kathiri; Al-Mashruki; Lakhm; Tayy; Kinda; Muayiya; Al-Sukun; Al-Sakasek; Madhhaj; Abidah; Al-Ans; Al-Harith; Banu al-Hakam; Sanhan; Nakha; Murad
- Language: Arabic, before: Sabaic
- Religion: Polytheism (pre-630); Islam (post-630)

Kahlan (Arabic: كهلان) was one of the main tribal confederations of Saba' in Ancient Yemen. They were descended from Kahlan bin Saba bin Yishjab bin Yarub bin Qahtan.

== Conflict with Himyar ==
By the 2nd century BC Saba' was declining gradually and its southern neighbor Himyar was able to settle many nomadic tribes that were allied to Himyar and create a stronger Himyarite nation in the lowlands. Eventually Saba' was incorporated into Himyar and resistance was reduced to the Kahlan tribes who were overpowered by Himyar and forced out of Highlands in Yemen. Most of Kahlan remained in the Yemeni desert region around Marib until the destruction of the Dam in the 3rd century AD. this forced the Kahlani tribes to emigrate northwards through Arabia. They reaching as far as Mesopotamia and Syria prior to the 7th century Arab conquests under Islam. After the Arab conquests, the Kahlani Arabs, among other Qahtani and Adnani tribes, reached all the way to the far edges of the Umayyad Empire.

== The Kahlan Septs ==
The Kahlan branched into 5 main branches; Azd, Hamdan, Lakhm, Tayy, Kinda. Madhhij

== Azd branches ==
In the 3rd century AD. The Azd branched into four branches each led by one of the sons of the Arabian king Muzayqiya.

=== Imran bin Amr ===
Imran bin Amr and the bulk of the tribe went to Oman where they established the Azdi presence in Eastern Arabia and later invaded Kerman and Shiraz in Southern Persia. Another branch headed west back to Yemen and a group went further West all the way to Tihama on the Red Sea. This branch will become known as Azd Uman after Islam.

=== Jafnah ibn 'Amr ===
Jafnah ibn Amr and his family, headed for Syria where he settled and initiated the kingdom of the Ghassanids who was so named after a spring of water where they stopped on their way to Syria.

=== Thalabah bin Amr ===
Thalabah bin Amr left his tribe Al-Azd for Hijaz and lived between Thalabiyah and Dhi Qar. When he gained strength, he headed for Yathrib where he stayed. Of his seed are the great Aws and Khazraj, sons of Haritha bin Thalabah. Those will be the Muslim Ansar and will produce the last Arab Dynasty in Spain (the Nasrids).

=== Haritha bin Amr ===
Haritha bin Amr. Lead a branch of the Azd Qahtani tribes wandered with his tribe in Hijaz until they came to Tihama. He has two sons Uday and Lahi, Uday father of Bariq and lahi father of Khuza'a.

== Hamdan branches ==
=== Hashid and Bakil ===
Today still in the same ancient tribal form in Yemen Hashid and Bakil of Hamdan remained in the highlands North of Sana'a between Marib and Hajja'a.

=== Banu Yam ===
Banu Yam settled to the North of Bakil in Najran (today in Saudi Arabia) it also branched into the tribes: the Al Murrah and the 'Ujman of eastern Saudi Arabia and the Persian Gulf coast.

=== Banu Kathir ===
Banu Kathir moved to Hadramut in the East of Yemen where they established their own sultanate.

=== Banu Al-Mashruki ===
Banu Al-Mashrouki settled in Lebanon producing well known Maronite influential families such as the Awwad, Massa'ad, Al-Sema'ani, Hasroun.

Banu Al Harith remained in Jabal Amil and were mainly Shia. A smaller group joined the Yemeni Druze and were eventually pushed by Kaysi Druze to Jabal Al Druze in Syria.

=== Banu Lakhm ===
Under the leadership of Malik bin Uday bin Al-Harith bin Murr bin Add bin Zayed bin Yashjub bin Uraieb bin Zayed. They spread to the North mainly in Southern and Western Mesopotamia, Rafah, Golan, Hauran and they were the first Southern Arabs to settle Northern Egypt where they were later joined with the Sicasik, Banu Judham and the Ghassanids. The Lakhmids produced The Abadi, Ubadi and Banu Bahr dynasties in Spain. Other notable Lakhmid is the late Arab leader Gamal Abdul Nasser from the Bani Mur of Banu Lakhm.

=== Banu Tayy ===
Led by Usma bin Luai in their massive exodus out of Yemen (115 BC), the Tayy invaded the mountains of Ajaa and Salma from Banu Assad and Banu Tamim in northern Arabia. The Tayy became camel herders and horse breeders and lived a nomadic lifestyle in northern Nejd for centuries. Because of their strength and blood relations with the Yemenite dynasties that came to rule Syria (Ghassan) and Iraq (the Lakhmids), they expanded north into Iraq all the way to the capital at the time al-Hirah. Tayy later changed their name to Shammar, renaming the mountains of Ajaa and Salma to Jabal Shammar (Shammar's Mountain).

== Kinda branches ==
The Kindah dwelt in the Bahrain but were expelled to East Yemen a group of them moved to Nejd where they instituted a powerful government that was a vassal kingdom for Himyar. They gradually declined After the fall of Himyar in 525 AD. The Kindites towns fell under constant bedouins raids from Nejd that eventually destroyed the Kindites and they were absorbed into the Najdi tribal federations.

=== Banu Muayiya ===
Ruled much of northern Arabia and Bahrain. They were mostly affiliated with Himyar and declined after its fall.

=== Banu Al-Sukun ===
Largely settled in Wadi Do'an east of Hadramout and did not play a major rule in the Kendite kingdom. they had long lasting battles with the native tribes of hadramout.

=== Banu Al-Sakasek ===
Alongside Banu Al-Sukun, they fairly ruled Hadramout.

=== Banu Al-Harith ===
Banu Al-Harith converted to Judaism and ruled the city of Najran.

== Ancient Arabian and Qahtani tribes that lived in Kahlan ==
=== Banu Amela ===
The Banu Amela were the first South Arabian tribe to settle The Southern part of Mt Lebanon later known as Jabal Amil, possibly as early as the 1st millennium BC.

=== Banu Judham ===
The Banu Judham dwelt with Lakhmids, Azdis in Syria and later settled Northern Egypt with Lakhmids. They were a Qahtani Yemeni tribe in alliance with the Kahlan tribes.

=== Sakasic ===
The Sakasic were a Himyarite tribe that settled Northern Egypt around 3rd century AD. They settled the ancient town of Bubastis in Egypt giving it its modern name Zaqaziq after the name of their Yemeni Tribe Sakasic. Also its one of Egypt provinces.

=== Banu Quda'a ===
The Banu Quda'a were a Himyarite tribe that was exiled from Yemen following the trials of the Lakhmids and they settled The Southern part of the Lakhmid Kingdom in the Samawa region.

== Sources ==
- Almaqhafi, Awwad: Qabayl Wa Biton Al-Arab
- Almsaodi, Abdulaziz; Tarikh Qabayl Al-Arab
- TheArabHistory.Com, Website
- History Ibn Khaldoun
- History Ibn al-Athir
- History Ibn Hisham
- History Al-Hamdani
