= Qahtanite =

Term referring to southern Arabs

Banu Qahtan بنو قحطان Al 'Arab Al 'Ariba العرب العاربة
- Qahtanite, Children of Qahtan/Joktan
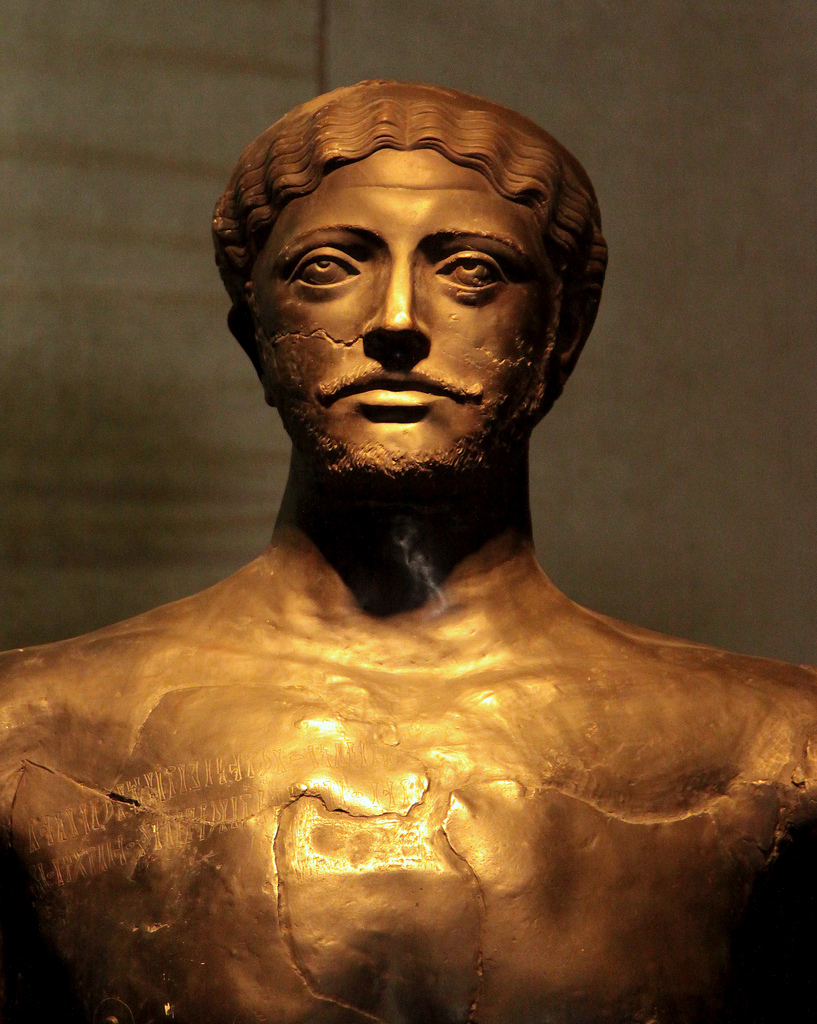
- A bronze statue of Dhamar Ali Yahbur II, a Himyarite king who probably reigned in the late 3rd or early 4th century CE. Displayed in the National Museum of Yemen
- Nisba: al-Qahtani (masculine) al-Qahtaniyyah (feminine)
- Location: The southern region of the Arabian Peninsula, e.g. Hadhramaut, Yemen
- Descended from: Yarub bin Qahtan
- Religion: Arabian mythology, Islam, Nestorian Christianity, Judaism, Aksumite polytheism, Nicene and Miaphysite Christianity

The Qahtanites (/ˈkɑːtənaɪts/; Arabic: قَحْطَانِيون, romanized: Qaḥṭānīyun), also known as Banu Qahtan (Arabic: بنو قحطان) or by their nickname al-Arab al-Ariba (Arabic: العرب العاربة), are the Arabs who originate from modern-day Hadhramaut, Yemen. The term "Qahtan" is mentioned in multiple Ancient South Arabian inscriptions found in Yemen. Some Arab traditions believe that the Qahtanites are the original Arabs.

In some Judeo-Christian-Islamic traditions, the Qahtanite Arabs descend from Jokshan, a son of Abraham through Keturah and half brother of Ishmael son of Abraham through Hagar. In other traditions, the Qahtanites descend from Joktan, son of Eber, brother of Peleg, and the father of 13 sons among whom are Hazarmaveth, Sheba, and Havilah.

== Traditional Arab genealogy ==
A map published by the British academic Harold Dixon during World War I, showing the presence of the Arab tribes in West Asia, 1914

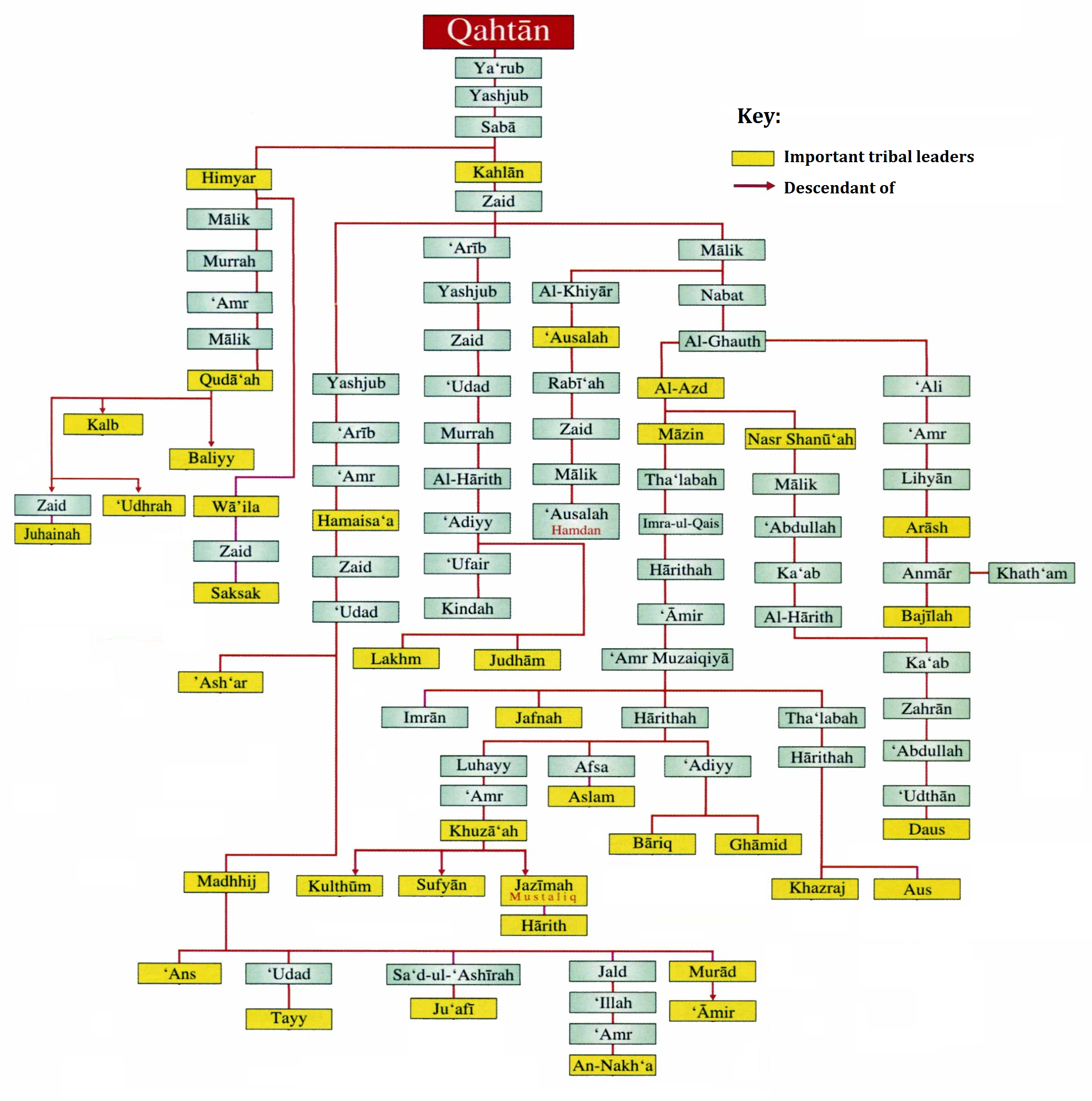
A family tree of the Qahtanites

According to Arab tradition, the Qahtanites are from South Arabia, unlike the Adnanites who are from the north of Arabia descended from Ishmael through Adnan. Arab tradition maintains that a semi-legendary ancestral figure named Qahtan and his 24 sons are the progenitors of Yemen who controlled the Arabian Peninsula known as Qahtani.

The genealogists disagree about the pedigree of Qahțān [himself]. Some trace him back to Ismā'īl b. Ibrāhīm, saying that his [name] was Qahṭān b. al - Hamaysa ' b. Tayman b. Nabt b. Ismā'īl b. Ibrāhīm. Wahb ibn Munabbih and Hishām b. Muhammad al-Kalbi held this genealogy to be true. Hisham ibn al-Kalbi quoted his father as saying that he had been contemporaneous with [older] scholars and genealogists who traced Qahțān's pedigree in this way. Other [genealogists] argue that the [name] was Qahţăn b. 'Abir b. Shalakh, equating Qahtan with the Yoqtan (Joktan) son of Eber (Hūd) in the Hebrew Bible (Genesis 10:25–29). Others still equate him with the similarly named Jokshan, son of Abraham and Keturah (Genesis 25:2–3).

Among the sons of Qahtan are noteworthy figures like A'zaal (believed by Arabs to have been the original name of Sanaa), Hadhramaut and Jurhum whose descendants formed the second Jurhum tribe from which Ishmael is traditionally believed to have learned Arabic by some. Another son is Ya'rub, and his son Yashjub is the father of Saba'. All Yemenite tribes trace their ancestry back to this Saba, through either of his two sons, Himyar or Kahlan.

The Qahtani people are divided into the two sub-groups of Himyar and Kahlan, who represent the settled Arabs of the south and their nomadic kinsmen (nomads). The Kahlan division of Qahtan consists of four subgroups: the Ta' or Tayy, the Azd group which invaded Oman, the 'Amila-Judham group of Palestine, and the Hamdan-Madhhij group who mostly remain in Yemen.

The Kahlan branch includes the following tribes: Azd (Aus and Khazraj, Bariq, Ghassan, Khuza'a and Daws), Hamdan, Khath'am, Bajila, Madhhij, Murad, Zubaid, Ash'ar, Lakhm, Tayy (Shammar), and Kinda.

=== Pre-Islamic Qahtani migration out of Arabia ===
Early Arabs who developed civilizations throughout the Ancient Near East gradually relinquished their geopolitical superiority to surrounding cultures and neighboring imperial powers, usually due to either internal turmoil or outside conflict. This climaxed with the arrival of the Babylonians, and subsequently the rivaling Medes and Persians, during the 7th and 6th centuries BCE, respectively. Though the Arabs lost geopolitical influence, the Aramaic language emerged as the lingua franca of much of the Near East. However, Aramaic usage declined after the defeat of the Persians and the arrival of the Hellenic armies around 330 BCE.

The Ghassanids (ca. 250 CE) were the last major non-Islamic Arab migration northward out of Yemen. They revived the Arab presence in the then Roman-controlled Syria. They initially settled in the Hauran region, eventually spreading to Palestine, and Jordan, briefly securing governorship of Syria away from the Nabataeans.

== After the rise of Islam ==
Between the 7th and 14th centuries, the Qahtanites became involved in the Arab conquests, migrating to the newly conquered territories and intermingling with the local populations. In the Umayyad era, a blood feud broke out between Qahtanites and the Adnanite tribes of Qays, which continued in various forms and degrees till the 19th century in what has become known as the Qays–Yaman rivalry.

== See also ==
- Banu Lahab
- Qahtan (disambiguation)
- Kahlan
- Hadhramaut
- Hakam, Yemen
