= Faisal bin Khalid Al Saud (born 1954) =

Saudi royal and government official (born 1954)

Governor of 'Asir Region
- In office: 16 May 2007 – 27 September 2018
- Predecessor: Khalid Al Faisal
- Successor: Turki bin Talal
- Monarch: King Abdullah; King Salman
- Born: 1954 (age 71–72); Riyadh
Names
- Faisal bin Khalid bin Abdulaziz Al Saud
- House: Al Saud
- Father: King Khalid
- Mother: Sita bint Fahd Al Damir
- Education: College of San Mateo

Faisal bin Khalid Al Saud (Arabic: فيصل بن خالد بن عبد العزيز آل سعود; born 1954) is a former governor of Asir Region and a member of the Saudi ruling family, son of King Khalid and grandson of King Abdulaziz.

== Early life and education ==
Prince Faisal was born in Riyadh in 1954. He is the youngest son of former King Khalid and Sita bint Fahd Al Damir, who died at the age of 90 in Riyadh on 25 December 2012. Faisal bin Khalid studied elementary and middle schools in Jeddah, and high school at the Institute of the capital Riyadh model. He completed his undergraduate studies at the College of San Mateo.

== Career ==
Prince Faisal was former deputy governor of Asir Province. He was appointed to this post in August 2003. His tenure lasted for four years. He was appointed governor of Asir Province on 16 May 2007.

He is chairman of the King Khalid Foundation. He is a member of the Allegiance Council. Faisal bin Khalid was also one of the advisors at the Crown Prince Court. In other words, he was one of the advisors of Crown Prince Nayef. The other two advisors of the Crown Prince were Mohammed bin Fahd and Mishaal bin Abdullah.

== Activities as a governor ==
Faisal bin Khalid was reported to successfully deal with protests by university students in King Khalid University in Abha in March 2012. On the other hand, although he cared for the students' demands, he also declared that such activities were results of those planning to harm the security of the Kingdom and that such plans would not be tolerated.

== Personal life and interests ==
Faisal bin Khalid is a supporter of equestrian stable and he owns Prince Faisal bin Khalid stable (Red Stable), one of the conventional stables in Saudi Arabia.
