= Wildlife of Saudi Arabia =

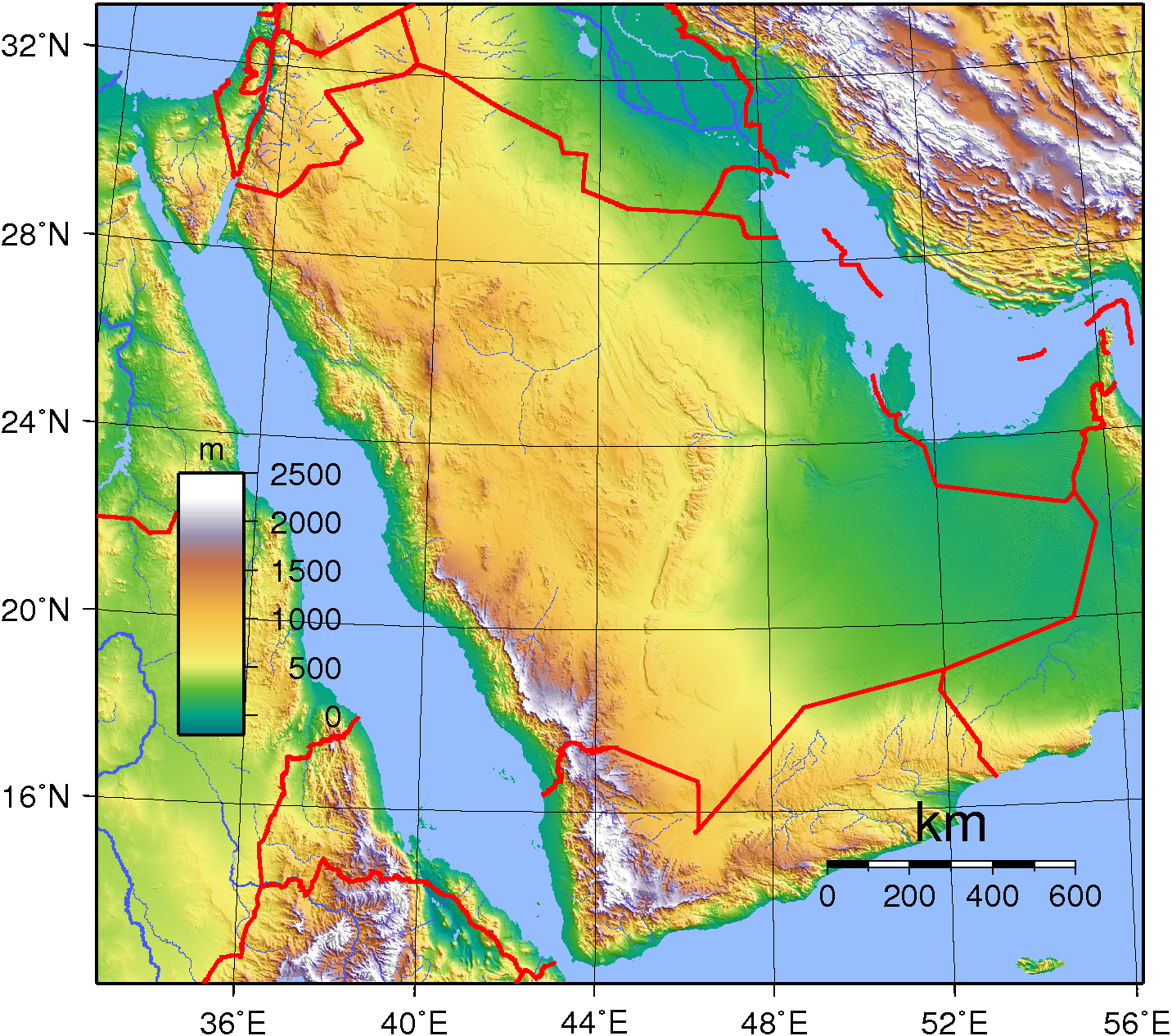
Topographic map of Saudi Arabia

The wildlife of Saudi Arabia is substantial and varied. Saudi Arabia is a very large country forming the biggest part of the Arabian Peninsula. It has several geographic regions, each with a diversity of plants and animals adapted to their own particular habitats. The country has several extensive mountain ranges, deserts, highlands, steppes, hills, wadis, volcanic areas, lakes and over 1300 islands. The Saudi Arabian coastline has a combined length of 2,640 km (1,640 mi) and consists of the Gulf of Aqaba and the Red Sea to the west while a shorter eastern coastline can be found along the Persian Gulf.

== Geography ==
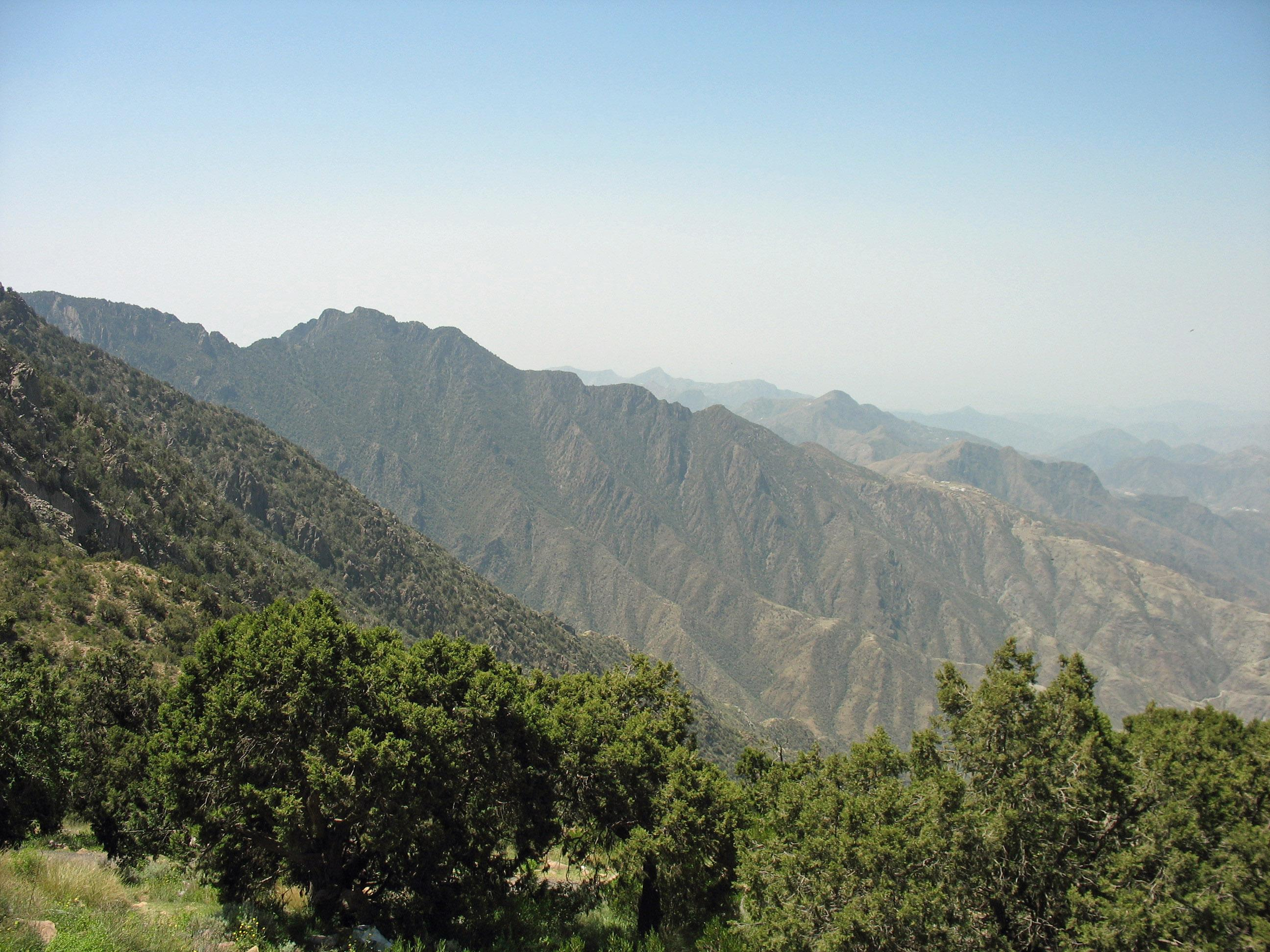
Mount Soudah of the Asir Mountains, once thought to be the highest mountain in the country

Saudi Arabia has a range of mountains, the Sarawat or Sarat Mountains, which run parallel with the Red Sea coast. These are low at the northern end, have a gap in the middle between Medina and Ta'if, and are higher at the southern end, where Mount Soudah in the Asir Mountains, at just over 3,000 m (10,000 ft) is the highest point in Saudi Arabia. Between these mountains and the Red Sea is a coastal plain known as Tihamah. The west side of this range is a steep escarpment but to the east is a wide plateau called the Najd which is bounded on the east by a series of mountain ridges, including the Ṭuwayq Mountains, east of which the land descends gradually to the Persian Gulf.

In the south of the country is the Rub' al Khali, or "Empty Quarter", the largest contiguous sand desert in the world. It slopes from about 800 m (2,600 ft) near the Yemeni border, northwestwards nearly to the Persian Gulf. Another sandy desert, the Nefud, lies in the north central part of Saudi Arabia, and it is connected to the Rub' al Khali by a broad swathe of sand dunes and gravel plains known as Dahna. Most of the country has very little precipitation, less than 8 cm (3 in) in many regions, and in the Rub' al Khali there may be no rain for a decade. The mountainous region of Asir in the southwest is wetter; it receives monsoon rains between May and October which may amount to 48 cm (19 in).

The northern Ha'il Region has the Shammar Mountains, further divisible into the Aja and Salma subranges.

The Red Sea was formed when in the Eocene period, the Arabian Peninsula began to move away from the continent of Africa. This prevented further exchange of genes between African and Arabian species. Furthermore, the late Tertiary and the early Quaternary eras saw a period of climatic cooling that drove vegetation bands southwards, and the Arabian Peninsula received an influx of species from Eurasia. With increasing aridity, conditions became inimical for many of these and they retreated to the damper, southwestern mountainous regions, becoming relict populations.

== Flora ==
Studying the flora of Saudi Arabia is a daunting task because of the vast size of the kingdom; the general pattern of vegetation is now known but the exact distribution of the many species of flowering plant is poorly understood. Almost 3,500 species of plant have been recorded in the country, with nearly 1,000 species known from the southwestern region of Asir with its higher rainfall. Plants in general are xerophytic and mostly dwarf shrubs or small herbs. There are few species of tree but date palms are abundant in places.

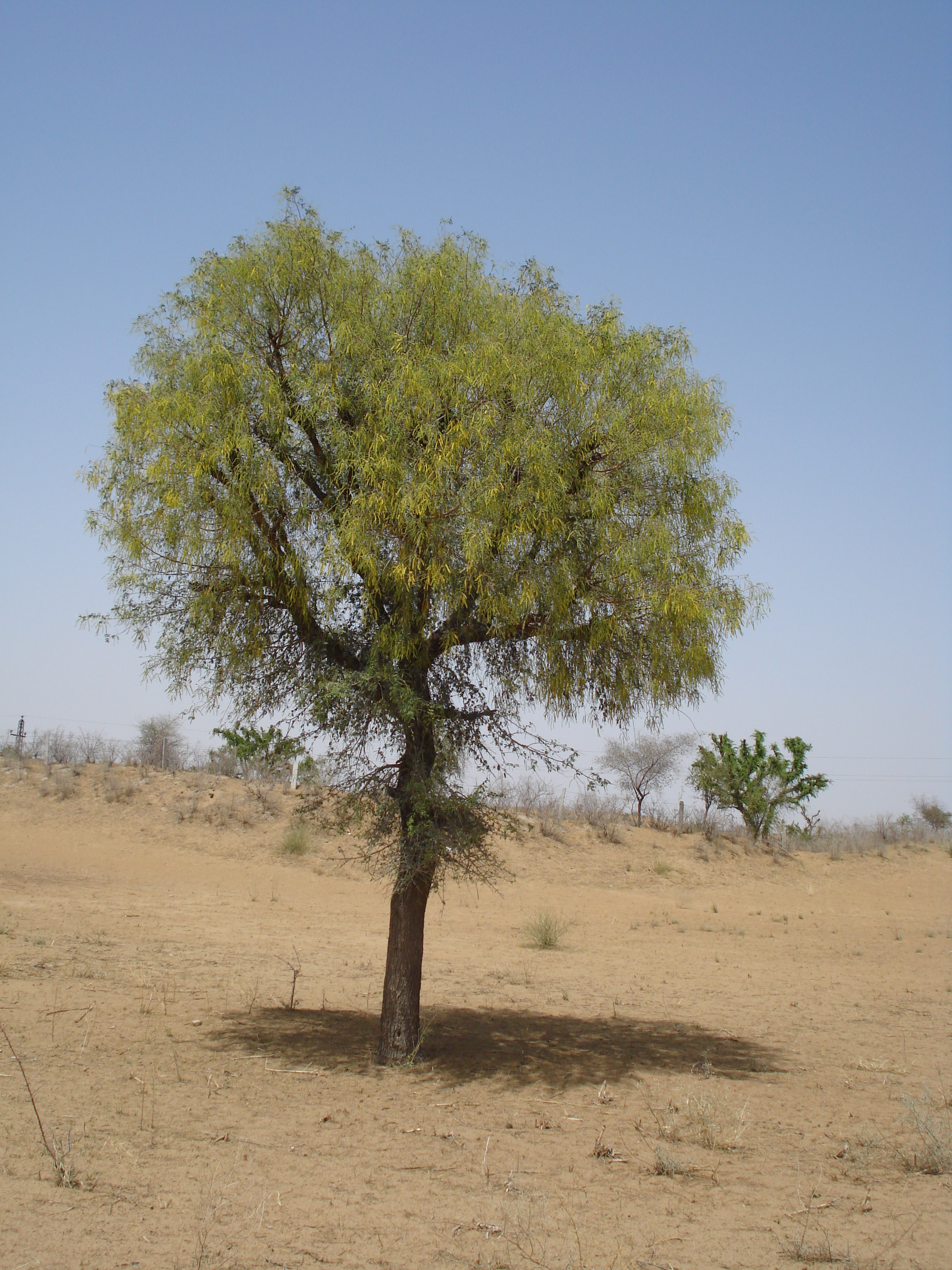
Prosopis cineraria grows around the fringes of deserts.

The east of Saudi Arabia often receives "Mediterranean depressions" from November onwards. The arrival of sufficient quantities of rain causes perennial plants to produce new shoots and the seeds of annual plants to germinate. These annuals grow with great rapidity and complete their life cycle within a few weeks. By April or May, the annuals will have flowered, set seeds and died, and the perennials returned to a state of dormancy.

In desert areas, plant growth is mostly confined to depressions or wadis, though some plants with deep rooting-systems grow elsewhere. The Rub' al Khali desert has very little plant diversity, with about 37 species of flowering plant having been recorded here, 17 of which are only found around the periphery of the desert. There are virtually no trees, and the plants are adapted for desert life and include dwarf shrubs such as Calligonum crinitum and saltbush, and several species of sedge. Around the margins of this desert are open woodlands with Acacia and Prosopis cineraria.

The Asir Mountains in the southwest of the country, and most of the western highlands of Yemen, support a distinct flora which has affinities with parts of East Africa. The highest parts are clothed with cloud forests, southwestern Arabian montane woodlands which includes, on north-facing slopes, Juniperus procera and Euryops arabicus, draped with the lichen Usnea articulata, and on south-facing slopes, dwarf shrubs such as Rubus petitianus, Rosa abyssinica, Alchemilla crytantha, Senecio and Helichrysum abyssinicum, with Aloe sabae and Euphorbia in the driest locations. Lower down, below about 2,500 m (8,200 ft), there is evergreen woodland and scrub dominated by Olea europaea subsp. cuspidata and Tarchonanthus camphoratus. Below about 2,000 m (6,600 ft) the vegetation is deciduous scrubland with Acacia, Commiphora, Grewia and succulent plants.

In Ha'il Region is located Jabal Aja Protected Area, which is noted for its flora, is located in the area of the Aja Mountains.

== Fauna ==
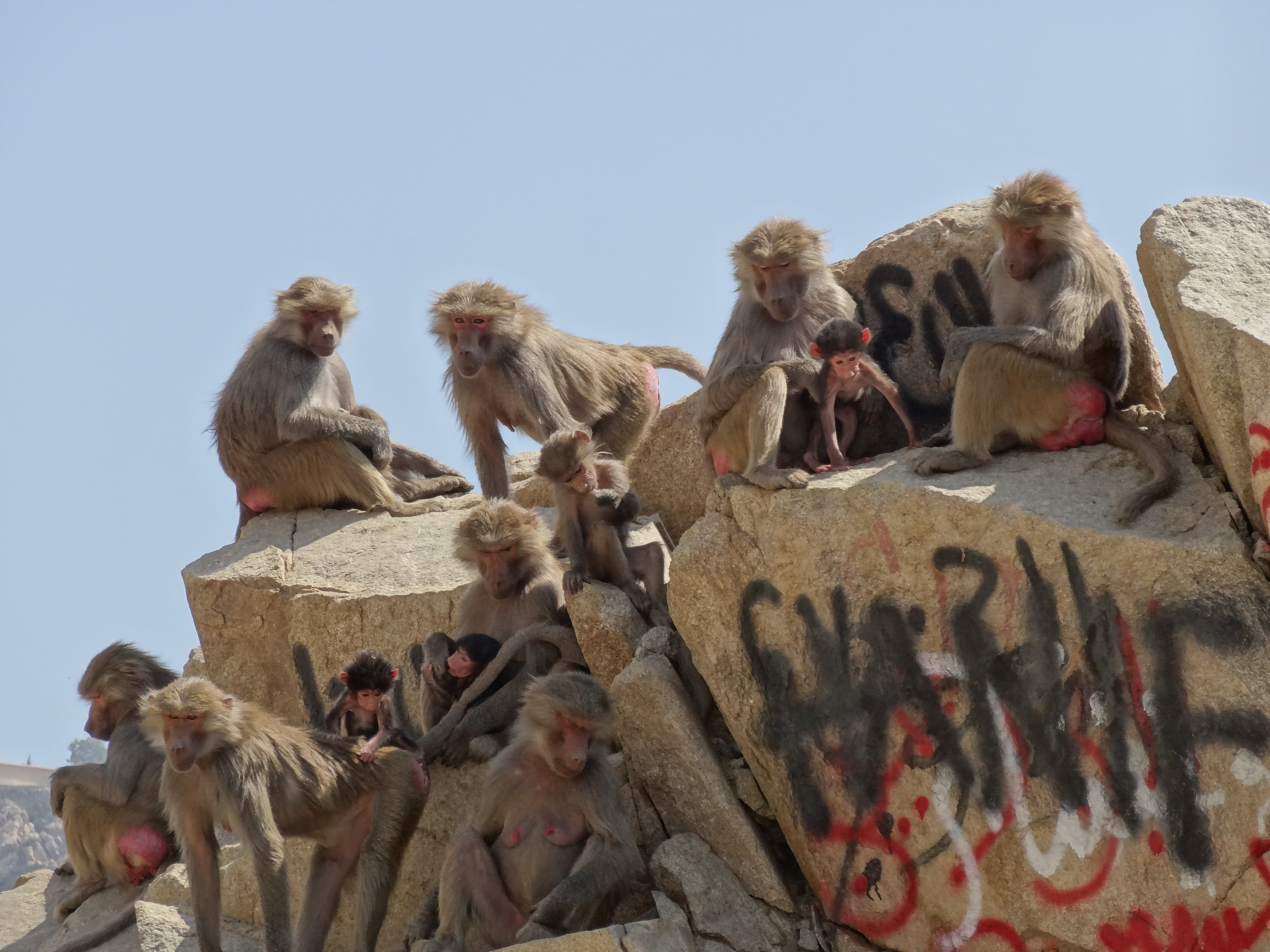
Hamadryas baboons in the Hijaz Mountains near Al Hada, Makkah Province

The fauna of Saudi Arabia has been better studied than the flora, not least because of interest in the larger mammals for the purpose of hunting and shooting. Birds and butterflies have also been studied, but less is known about other parts of the animal kingdom. Some of the larger mammals found here include the dromedary camel, the Arabian tahr, the Arabian wolf, the Arabian red fox and fennec, the caracal, the striped hyena, the sand cat, the rock hyrax, and the Cape hare. However habitat destruction, hunting, off-road driving and other human activities have led to the local extinction of the striped hyena, the golden jackal and the honey badger in some localities. The Asir Mountains in the southwest of the country is where the critically endangered Arabian leopard is still to be found, and the broader region is also home to the hamadryas baboon with colonies reaching as far north as Baha, Taif, and the suburbs south of Mecca.

The Arabian oryx used to roam over Saudi Arabia's deserts and much of the Middle East but by 1970, it had been hunted to extinction in the wild. However, a captive breeding programme had been initiated at the Phoenix Zoo in the United States in the 1960s and the oryx has since been successfully reintroduced into the wild in the Mahazat as-Sayd Protected Area in Saudi Arabia, a fenced reserve of over 2,200 km^{2} (850 mi^{2}). It is also now present in the 'Uruq Bani Ma'arid protected area, where the goitered gazelle and mountain gazelle are also to be found.

The sand cat, which is the only member of the cat family to live exclusively in deserts, can be found in the western region of Saudi Arabia. Its paws are covered with thick hair to protect it from the hot ground, but it is chiefly nocturnal. In Najd and Tabuk, the Arabian wolf can be found. It is a solitary hunter and is persecuted by livestock owners. Only 2000 to 3000 wolves are left in the wild, and accordingly they are considered endangered.

Birds native to Saudi Arabia include sandgrouse, quails, eagles, buzzards and larks and on the coast, seabirds include pelicans and gulls. The country is also visited by migratory birds including flamingoes, storks and swallows in spring and autumn. MacQueen's bustard is a resident species that is dependent on good vegetation cover, often being found in areas with dense scrubby growth with shrubs such as Capparis spinosa. The cliff faces of the Asir Mountains provide habitat for the griffon vulture, the Verreaux's eagle and the small Barbary falcon, and the juniper woodlands are home to the Yemen linnet, the Yemen thrush, the Yemen warbler and the African paradise flycatcher. The hamerkop nests in the Wadi Turabah Nature Reserve, the only place on the Arabian Peninsula at which it is found.

=== Extinct ===
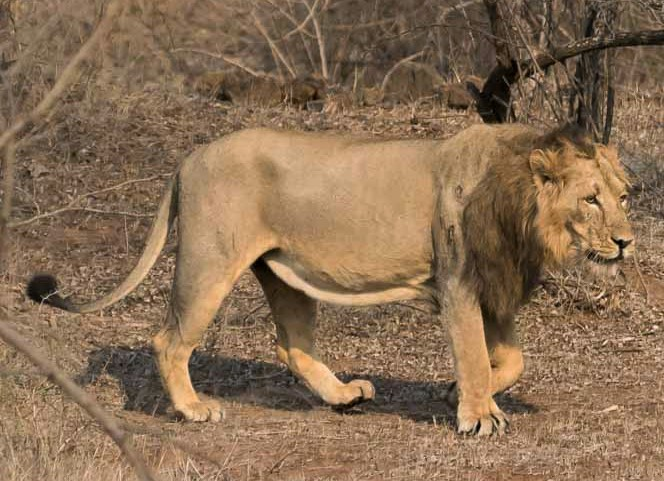
The Asiatic lion, which used to occur in the Arabian Peninsula and the Middle East, but currently survives in India

The lion, the cheetah, the Arabian ostrich, and the Syrian wild ass used to occur here, as evidenced by Islamic texts like the Quran (74: 50–51). For example, there is a hadith in Muwatta' Imam Malik about Muslim pilgrims having to beware of the asad (lion) and fahd (cheetah) in the land, besides other animals. The country's last known cheetahs were killed near Ha'il in 1973. The lion reportedly became extinct in the middle of the 19th century. Later on, a 325,000-year-old tusk of an extinct type of elephants known as Palaeoloxodon was found in An Nafud desert in northwestern Saudi Arabia, in addition to remains of an extinct jaguar, oryx and a member of the horse family. In 2020, footprints of humans, camels, buffaloes, elephants and other species, dated to 120,000 years ago, were found in Tabuk Province near what was then a shallow lake.

== See also ==
- List of birds of Saudi Arabia
- List of cockroaches of Saudi Arabia
- List of mammals of Saudi Arabia
