= Soudah Peaks =

Project to develop a mountain tourism destination in 'Asir

- قمم السودة

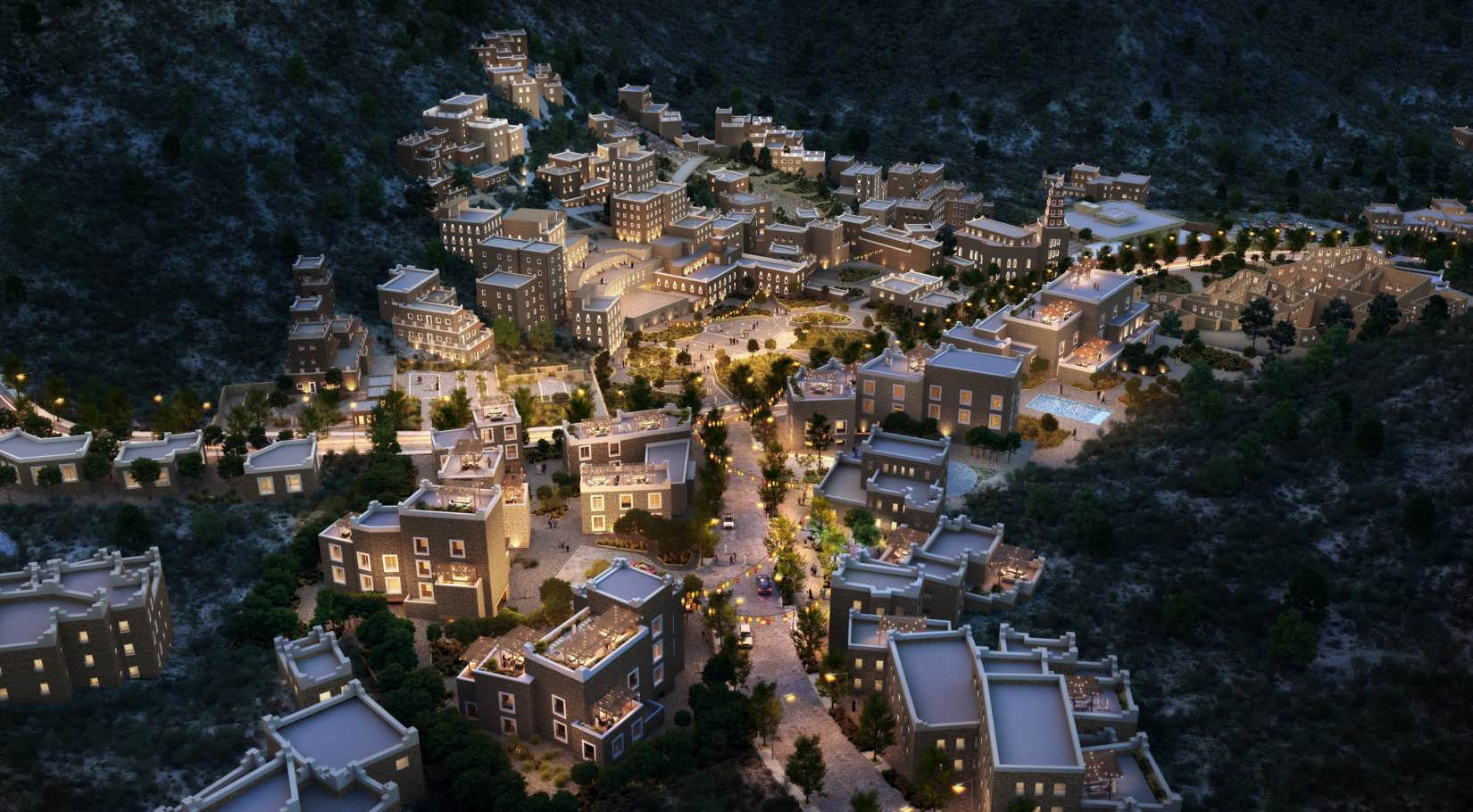
- Location: Soudah, Asir Province, Saudi Arabia
- Owner: Public Investment Fund
- Founder: Mohammed bin Salman
- Key people: Daniel McBrearty (Chief Development Officer)
- Established: 25 September 2023; 3 years ago
- Budget: $7.7 Billion
- Website: www.soudahpeaks.com

Soudah Peaks (Arabic: قمم السودة) is a planned mountain tourism destination project in Soudah, Asir Province, Saudi Arabia. Soudah Peaks project is developed by Soudah Development Company (SDC), one of the companies founded by the Saudi Public Investment Fund. The $7.7 billion project was officially announced by Crown Prince Mohammed bin Salman in September 2023. It spans a total area of 627 km^{2} with an elevation of 3,207 m above sea level and a prominence of 3,015 m above sea level on Saudi Arabia's highest peak, Jabal Soudah.

As part of Saudi Arabia's Vision 2030 to diversify the Saudi economy away from oil, SDC says that the project will create contribute more than $7.8 billion to Saudi Arabia's national GDP by the year 2033, in addition to creating thousands of jobs. The project aims to attract 2 million annual visitors by the year 2033.

== Background ==
Soudah Peaks was launched on 25 September 2023 by Crown Prince Mohammed bin Salman as one of Saudi Arabia's Vision 2030 projects.

Soudah Peaks will go through 3 development phases:

- The first phase is expected to start in 2024, and will be completed in 2026. This phase includes the development of five of the six zones. In addition, it will include the construction of 940 hotel units, 391 residential units, and 1,025 staff accommodation units.
- The second phase will begin construction in 2027, and is expected to be completed in 2029. This phase will increase the total capacity to 1,735 hotel units, 641 residential units, and 2,150 staff accommodation units.
- The third and final phase is expected to be inaugurated by 2033. This phase includes the development of Jareen, last of the six development zones. The total capacity by the end of this phase will be 2,700 hotel units, 1,336 residential units, and 3,022 staff accommodation units.

== Zones ==
The following list contains the zones included in the Soudah Peaks Project:

Zones
| Name | Total Area (m^{2}) | Website |
|---|---|---|
| Sabrah | 155,608 | www.soudahpeaks.com/master-plan/sabrah/ |
| Rijal | 14,713 | www.soudahpeaks.com/master-plan/rijal/ |
| Sahab | 57,212 | www.soudahpeaks.com/master-plan/sahab/ |
| Jareen | TBA | www.soudahpeaks.com/master-plan/jareen/ |
| Tahlal | 766,086 | www.soudahpeaks.com/master-plan/tahlal/ |
| Red Rock | 40,382 | www.soudahpeaks.com/master-plan/red-rock/ |

== See also ==
- List of Saudi Vision 2030 Projects
- Saudi Vision 2030
- Neom
- Al Soudah
- Jabal Soudah
