= Rijal Almaa =

Village in Asir Province, Saudi Arabia

Rijal Almaa رِجَالْ أَلْمَعْ
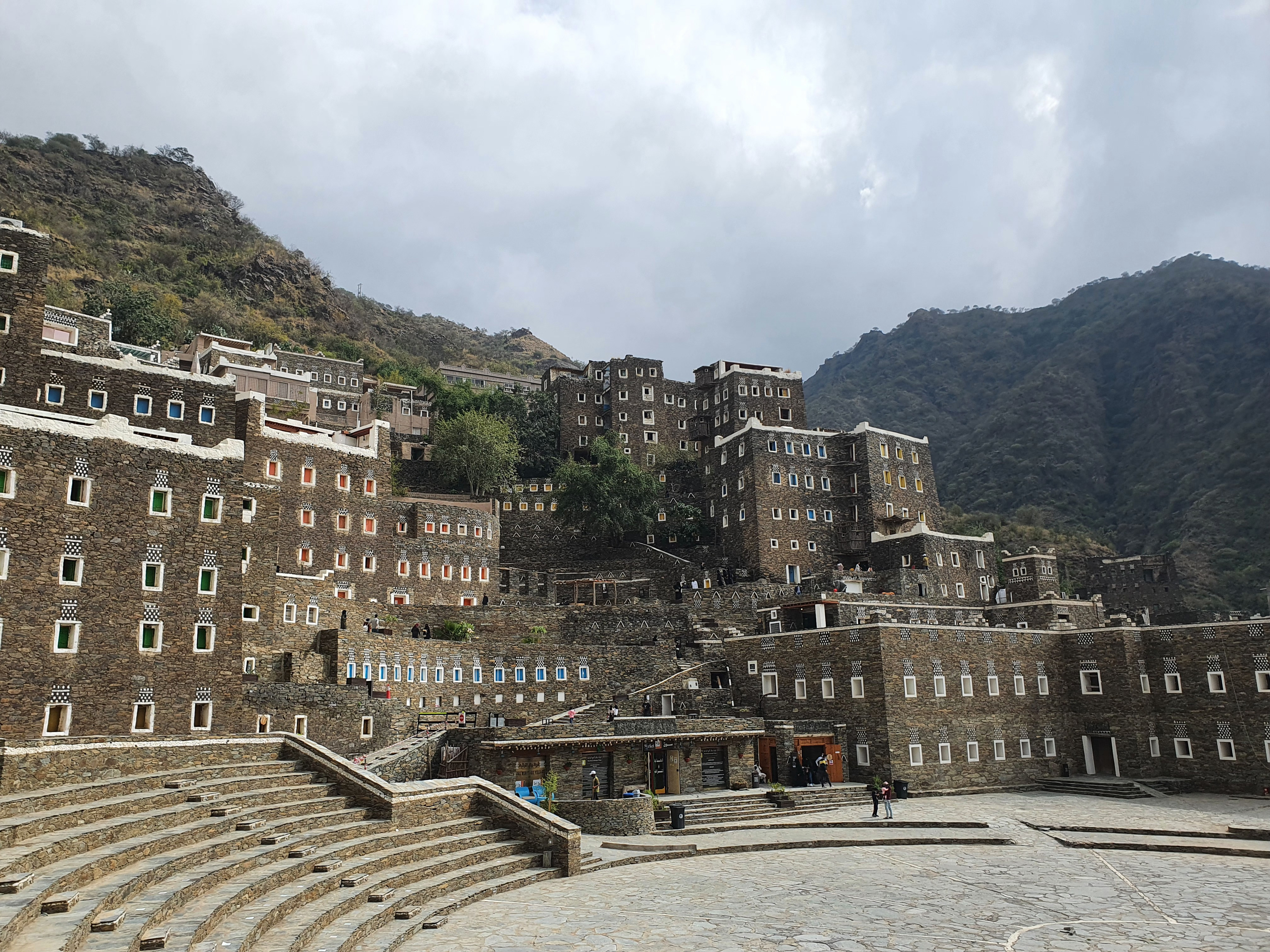
- Rijal Almaa Village

- Location within Saudi Arabia
- 18°12′45″N 42°16′25″E
- Type: Village
- Location: Asir Province, Saudi Arabia

Site notes
- Website: Official Website

Rijal Almaa or Rijal Almaʽa (Arabic: رجال ألمع) is a village located in the Asir province, Saudi Arabia. It is about 50 km (31 mi) west of Abha, in the southwest of Saudi Arabia. The village is more than 900 years old. The village had an ideal location through which it linked the people coming from Yemen and the Levant through the Holy City of Mecca and Medina. As a result, it became a regional trade center.

Rijal Almaa contains around 60 multi-story buildings made of stone, clay and wood. The village has historical significance as it has a number of long and old fortresses. As the village is open for visitors, people can reach the place through a number of ways including Sawda Center, Aqabat Sama, Muhayil Asir and Hobail.

== Description ==
The village includes several stone buildings, some reaching as many as eight floors, featuring distinctive colored wooden windows. They also contain inscriptions that appear on the interior walls of rooms. The art used in these inscriptions is known as the "Al-Qatt art", in which harmonious shapes and colors are usually placed by village women. The outer courtyards of the houses often have wooden chairs and furnished mats featuring the green, white, yellow, and red geometric shapes that are also present on the windows and wooden doors.

== Museum ==
In the middle of the village, there is a museum called the “Rijal Alma'a Heritage Museum”, which takes the Al Al-wan Palace as its headquarters it was chosen because it includes several floors and its construction dates back to more than four centuries, and the palace has gone through renovation works in which the villagers participated in. The museum displays the village's unique heritage, antiquities, and collections of manuscripts, tools, and weapons, as it houses more than two thousand antiquities and documents distributed in nineteen sections of the museum.

== 21st-century developments ==
In 2015, a rehabilitation project was undertaken by the Saudi Commission for Tourism and Antiquities in collaboration with the private sector. Moreover, a museum was established by the local people in one of the village's forts in 1985.

In 2017, the village was awarded the prize of Prince Sultan bin Salman for Urban Heritage. In January 2018, the Saudi Commission for Tourism and National Heritage (SCTH) has given Rijal Almaa the right to file for the UNESCO World Heritage Center.

In September 2023, Crown Prince Mohammed bin Salman announced Soudah Peaks, a tourism project to develop of 6 different regions in Jabal Soudah, including Rijal Almaa.

== Gallery ==
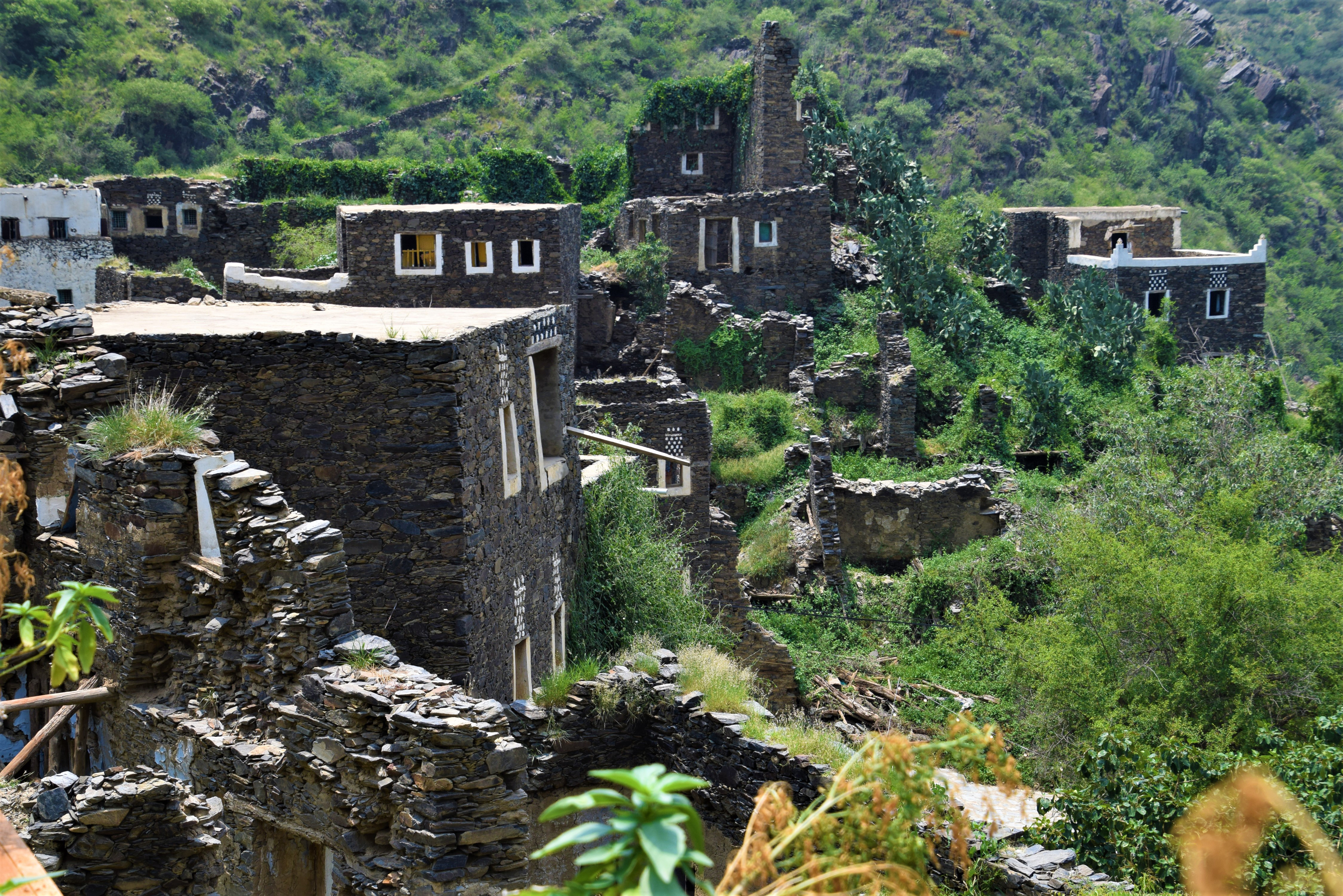
Old Ruins in Rijal Almaa

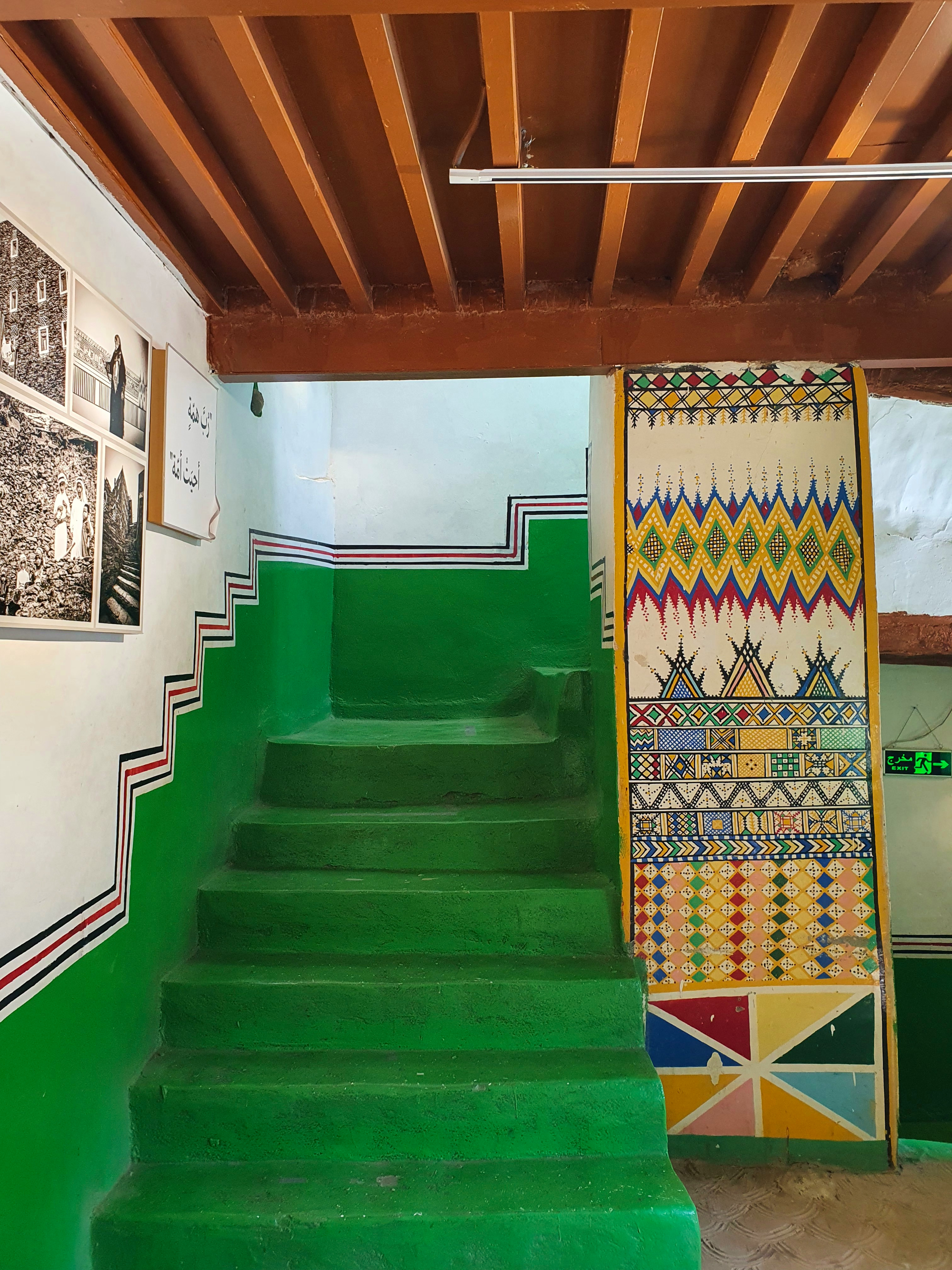
Heritage Village Museum from the inside

== See also ==
- Tourism in Saudi Arabia
- Soudah Peaks
- Al Soudah
