= Asir Mountains =

Mountain range in Saudi Arabia

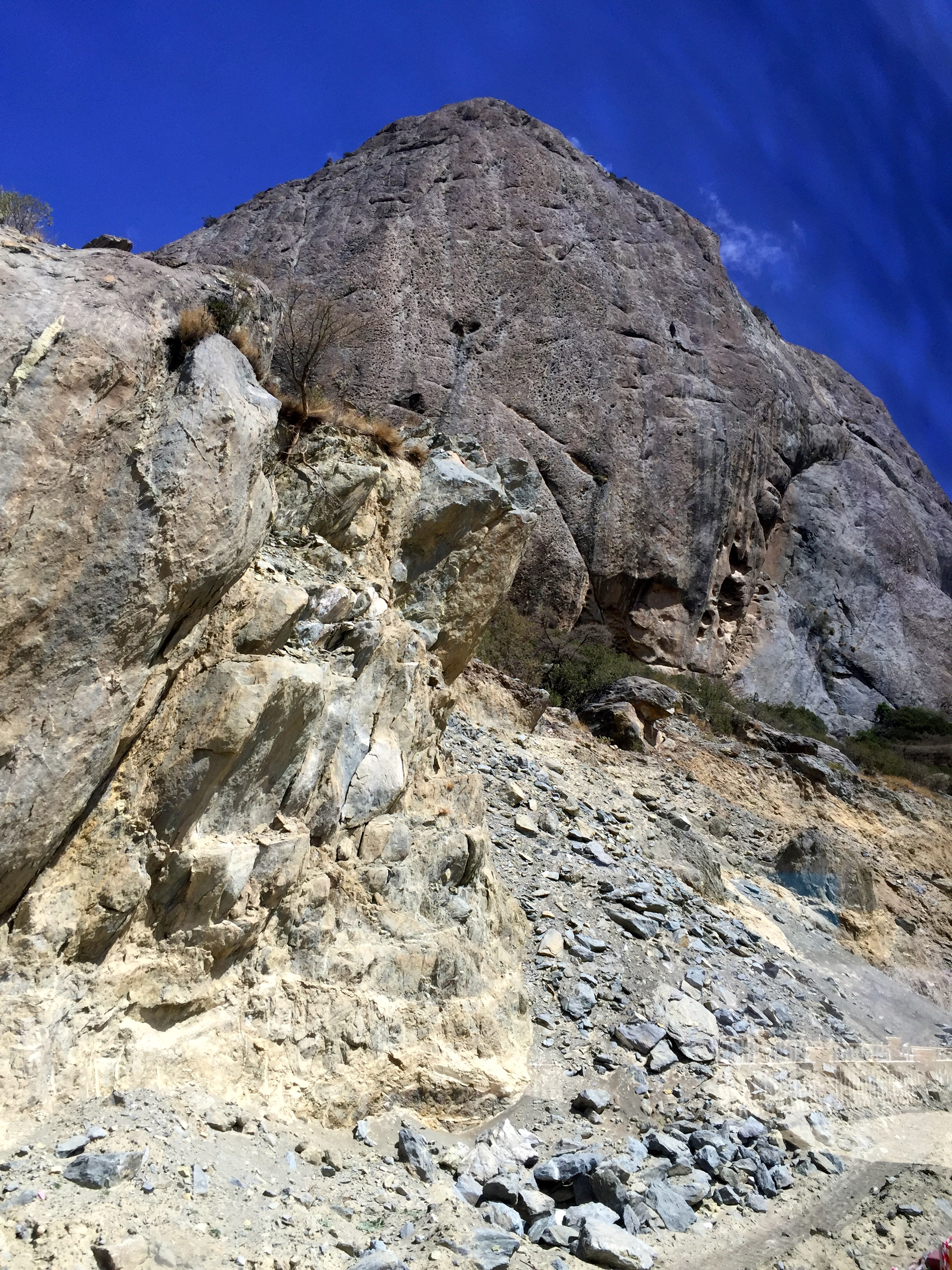
- A rocky mountain in the range

Highest point
- Peak: Jabal Soudah
- Elevation: 3,207 m (10,522 ft)

Naming
- Native name: جِبَال عَسِيْر (Arabic)

Geography
- Location within Saudi Arabia Location within Middle East Location within West and Central Asia
- Country: Saudi Arabia
- Region: South Arabia
- Province: Asir
- Range coordinates: 21.6°N 39.8°E

The Asir Mountains (Arabic: جِبَال عَسِيْر, jibāl ʿasīr; Arabic pronunciation: [d͡ʒɪbaːl ʕasiːr] ('Difficult')) is a mountainous region in southwestern Saudi Arabia running parallel to the Red Sea. It comprises areas in the Asir Province, but generally, it also includes areas near the border with Yemen. The mountains cover approximately 100,000 square kilometres (40,000 mi^{2}) and consists of mountains, plains, and valleys of the Arabian highlands. Broadly, they are part of the Sarawat Mountains, defining the latter as the mountain range which runs parallel to the Tihamah throughout the western portion of the Arabian Peninsula, particularly the western parts of Saudi Arabia and Yemen.

== Geology ==
The mountains consist primarily of sedimentary rock, limestone, sandstone and shale, of Jurassic, Cretaceous and Paleogene origin on a Precambrian granitic basement.

== Climate and agriculture ==
The region has the highest average rainfall of Saudi Arabia due to largely seasonal rain. Average rainfall can range from 600 millimetres (24 in) to over 1,000 millimetres (39 in) per year, in wet regions. The eastern plains and plateaus receive much lower amounts, from 500 millimetres (20 in) to below 100 millimetres (3.9 in) per year.

The region's crops, most of which are cultivated on steeply terraced mountainsides, include wheat, coffee, cotton, indigo, ginger, vegetables, and palms. The region also supports cattle, sheep, goats, and camels.

== Biodiversity ==
The region's difficult terrain has helped preserve the region's unique biodiversity. Several new Myxomycetes fungi species have been discovered in the region, as have a variety of previously undiscovered plants. Asir is also thought to be one of the last natural habitats of the Arabian leopard. and also the Asir magpie, believed to be down to its last 135 pairs.

== Gallery ==
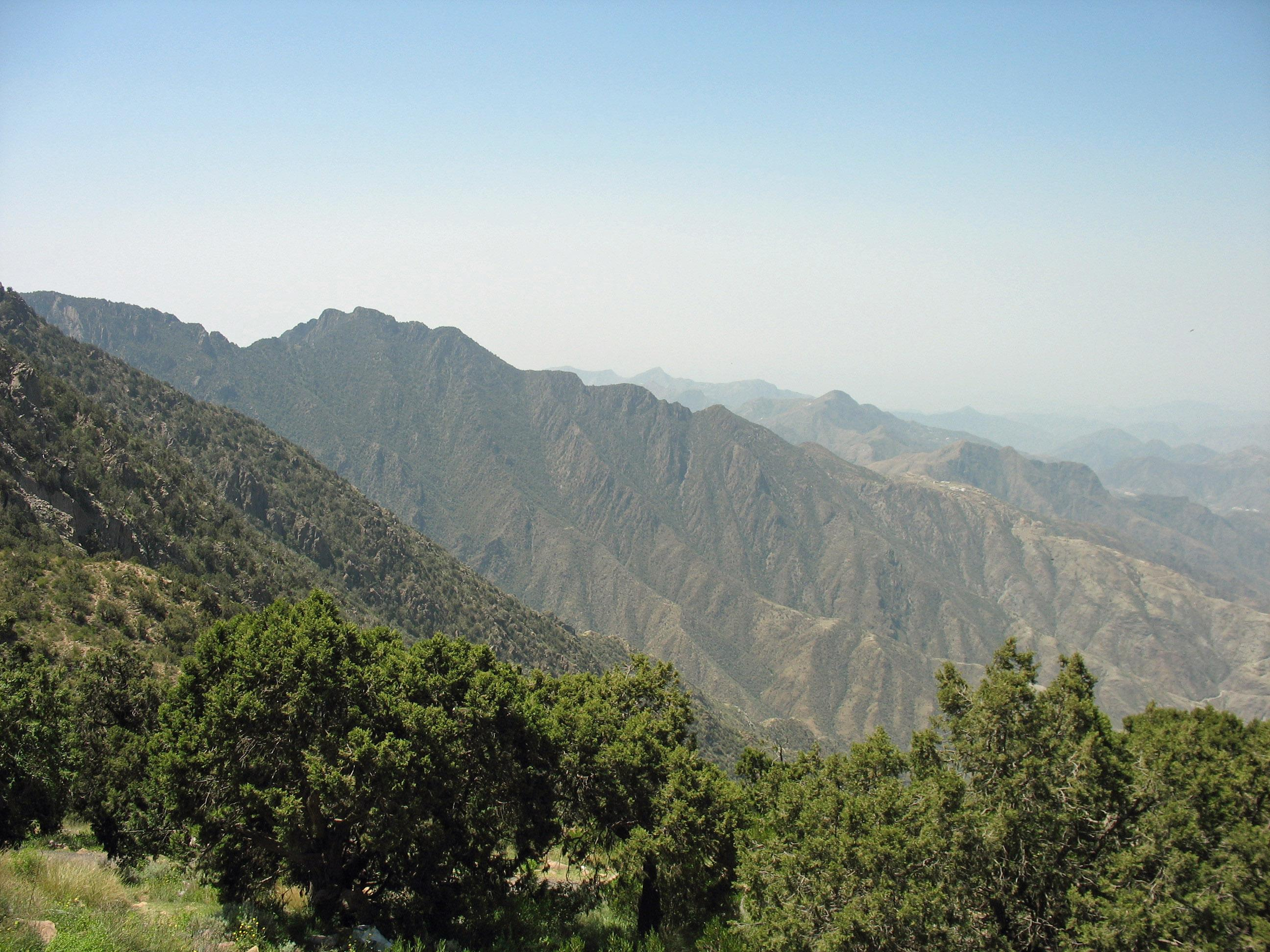
Jabal Soudah ("Mount Soudah")

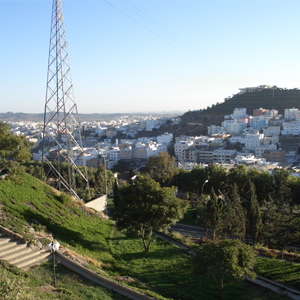
Abha City, located 2,270 m (7,450 ft) above sea level in the Asir Province

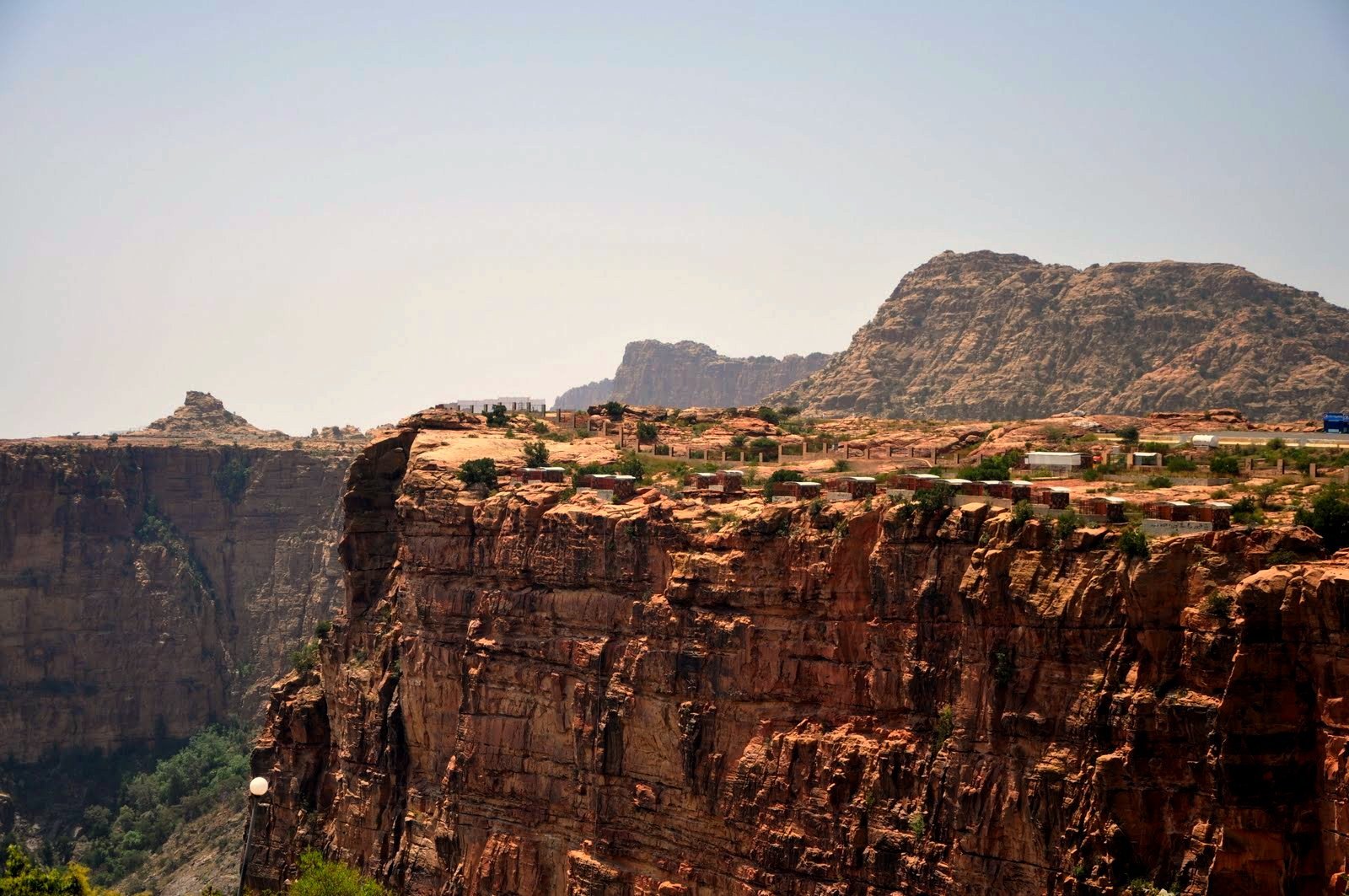
Habalah Valley near Abha

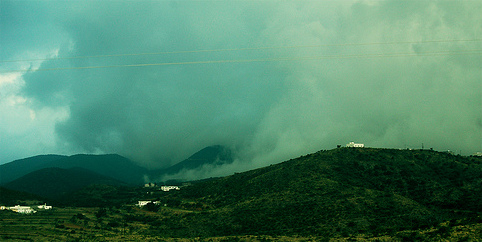
Al-Soudah

Jabal Atherb, as seen from Ḥawālah in Bareq

== See also ==
- Geography of Saudi Arabia
- List of mountains in Saudi Arabia
- Wildlife of Saudi Arabia
