= Abha =

Capital governorate of Aseer Province, Saudi Arabia

Abha أَبْهَا
- City
- Abha
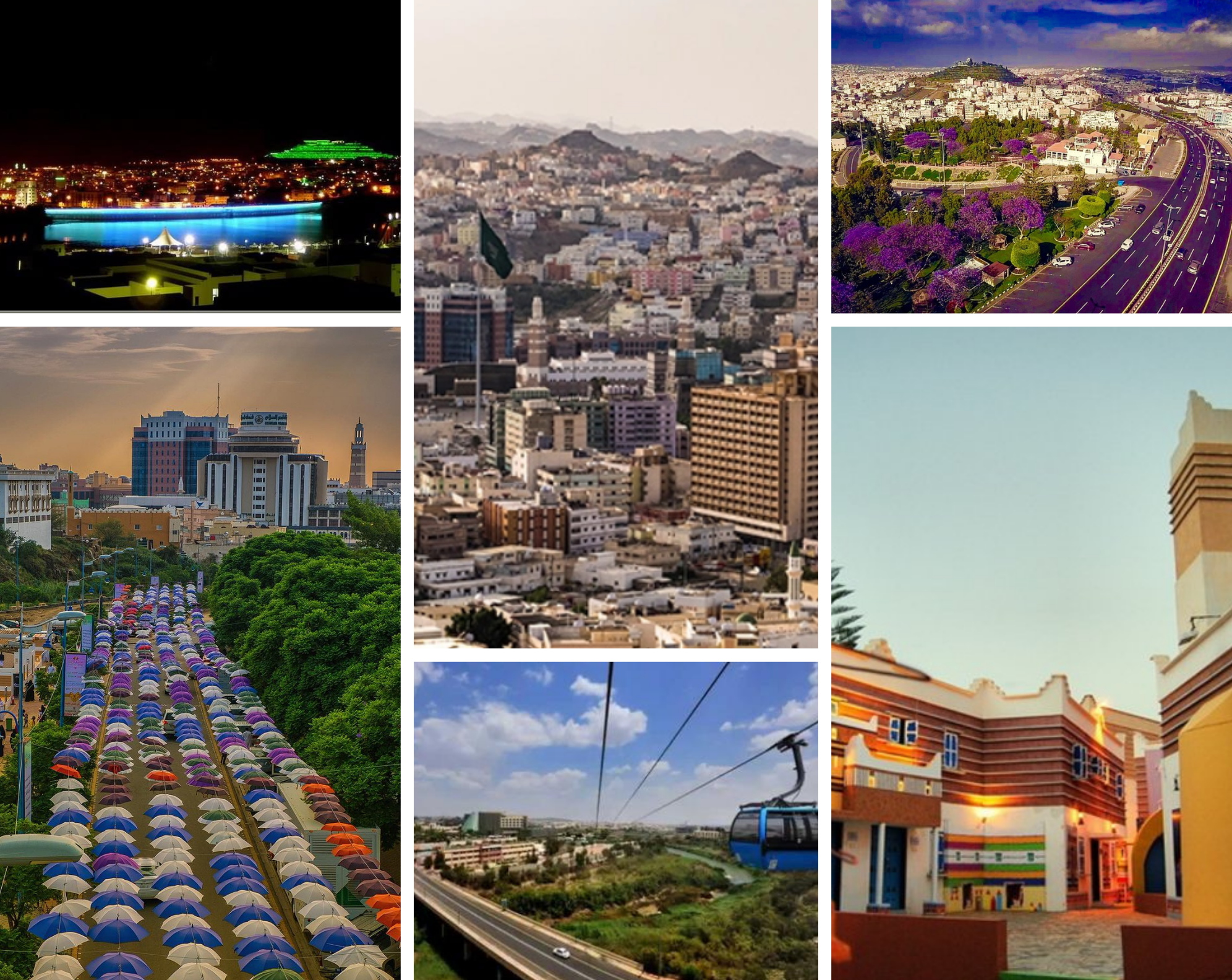
- Nicknames: Bride of Mountain; The City of Fog; Lover of Clouds, Abha the Beauty
- Location in Saudi Arabia Location in Middle East Location in Asia
- Coordinates: 18°13′1″N 42°30′19″E
- Country: Saudi Arabia
- Province: Asir Province

Government
  - Governor: Turki bin Talal
- Elevation: 2,270 m (7,450 ft)

Population (2022 census)
  - City: 334,290
  - Metro: 1,093,705 (Abha Governorate)
- Time zone: UTC+3 (AST)
  - Summer (DST): UTC+3 (AST)
- Area code: +966 17

Abha (Arabic: أَبْهَا, ʾAbhā) is the capital of Asir Province in Saudi Arabia. It is situated 2,270 metres (7,450 feet) above sea level in the fertile Asir Mountains of south-western Saudi Arabia, near Asir National Park. Abha's mild climate makes it a popular tourist destination for Saudis. Saudis also call the city the Bride of Mountain due to its position above the sea.

== History ==
Map of Arabia in 600 CE

Abha was the capital city for the Prince of Asir Ibn Ayde under the authority of the Ottoman Empire until World War I. In 1918, the Prince of Asir, Yahya bin Hasun Al Ayde, grandson of Ibn Ayed, returned to his family throne conquered in Abha with complete independence. In 1920, Asir was conquered by the Ikhwan tribesmen of Nejd loyal to Ibn Saud during the Unification of Saudi Arabia. Abha has many historic places such as forts and other locations, thanks to the region's cultural heritage. Bani Shehr, Bani Amr, Bal-Ahmar, Bal-Asmar, Bal-Qarn, Shumran and some others belong to Al-Azd and some extended families, such as Qahtan, and Shahran, which belong to Hood. Azdi tribes had migrated after Marib Dam collapsed for the third time in the third century AD.

Al-Namas, Billasmar Region, Hawra Billasmar Center, Khaled, Eyaa Valley, Athneen Billasmar (which is the capital), Subuh Billahmar, Al-Nimas, Tanomah, Al-Majaredah place, Bal-Qarn Center, and Sabt Alalyaa place (Bishah, Wadi Bin Hashbaal) and some other known places that belong to the Asir Region.

In 2015, a group of terrorists attacked a big mosque in Abha. Many of the 15 people killed were police officers.

== Transportation ==
A coastal road connecting Jeddah and Abha was completed in 1979. A SAPTCO bus station connects Abha to other destinations within Saudi Arabia.

Abha International Airport (Arabic: مَطَار أَبْهَا, romanized: Maṭār Abhā, IATA: AHB[3], ICAO: OEAB) is Abha's main airport. International connections are available to Yemen (Sana'a), Egypt (Cairo), Qatar (Doha) and the UAE (Dubai, Sharjah), as well as to other destinations within Saudi Arabia. Construction of Dutch-designed Abha Airport began in mid-1975, and flights began in 1977. Before construction of the airport, domestic flights were serviced by the military airport near Khamis Mushait by Ali Misfer Ibn Misfer, who was the founder of aviation in Abha in 1945.

== Landmarks ==
The city of Abha is composed of four quarters, the largest of which contains a fortress. Hilltop fortresses are a characteristic feature of the city. Shadda Palace, built in 1927, is now a museum displaying local handicrafts and household items. Other notable buildings in Abha include the Abha Great Mosque, the Al-Tahy restaurant, the Abha Palace Hotel, and the funpark next to Lake Sadd. The New Abha five-star hotel is a recent construction on the lake, 1.5 km (0.93 miles) southwest of the town. The head office and the main printing presses of Al Watan, a major Saudi daily, are in Abha.

== Culture ==
The Saudi government has promoted Abha as a tourist destination. The city hosts events to attract visitors to the city and its surroundings, including the summer Abha Festival, sporting events, shows, exhibitions, and musical performances poets and singers. The artist Talal Maddah died on stage during one such performance in Abha.

== Sport ==
Abha Club is the city's biggest football club, currently playing in the Saudi First Division League, the second tier of Saudi football. Their home stadium is the 20000 capacity Prince Sultan bin Abdulaziz Sports City.

== Education ==
King Khalid University is a public university in Abha. The university was established in 1998 by merging the Imam Muhammed bin Saud University of Islamic Studies and the King Saud University of the South. The total number of enrolled students is approximately 85,000.

== Geography and climate ==
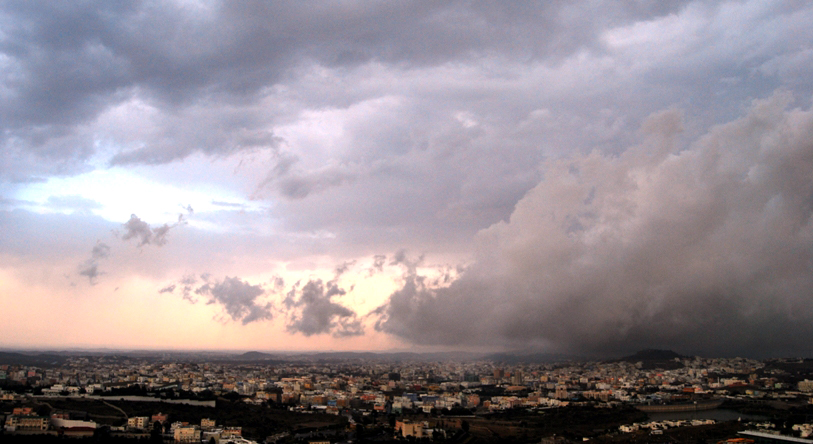
Abha sky

Abha is located in the southern region of Asir at an elevation of about 2,270 metres (7,450 feet) above sea level. Abha lies on the western edge of Mount Al-Hijaz, near Jabal Sawda, the highest peak in Saudi Arabia. Treating the Asir Mountains as part of the Sarawat, the landscape is otherwise dominated by the Sarawat Mountains.

Abha has a hot desert climate (Köppen: BWh) bordering on a hot semi-desert climate (Köppen: BSh) that is influenced by city's high elevation. However, the city shows weather trends that of a temperate climate, apart from the lower than usual precipitation levels. The city's weather is generally mild throughout the year, becoming noticeably cooler during the "low-sun" season. Abha seldom sees temperatures rise above 35 °C (95.0 °F) during the course of the year. The city averages 278 millimetres (11 in) of rainfall annually, with the bulk of the precipitation occurring between February and April, with a secondary minor wet season in July and August associated with the northward movement of the Intertropical Convergence Zone. Abha gets about 11 percent of its irrigation water from rainwater harvesting.

The highest recorded temperature was 40 °C (104 °F) on August 25, 1983, while the lowest recorded temperature was −2 °C (28 °F) on December 29, 1983. It does occasionally snow in Abha, particularly in higher reaches.

Climate data for Abha (1991–2020, extremes since 1978)
Month	Jan	Feb	Mar	Apr	May	Jun	Jul	Aug	Sep	Oct	Nov	Dec	Year
Record high °C (°F)	27.4 (81.3)	28.2 (82.8)	29.9 (85.8)	31.3 (88.3)	34.1 (93.4)	35.2 (95.4)	35.4 (95.7)	40.0 (104.0)	34.0 (93.2)	30.6 (87.1)	27.9 (82.2)	26.9 (80.4)	40.0 (104.0)
Mean daily maximum °C (°F)	20.1 (68.2)	21.8 (71.2)	23.5 (74.3)	25.9 (78.6)	29.0 (84.2)	31.4 (88.5)	31.0 (87.8)	30.7 (87.3)	30.0 (86.0)	26.4 (79.5)	23.1 (73.6)	21.1 (70.0)	26.2 (79.1)
Daily mean °C (°F)	13.8 (56.8)	15.4 (59.7)	17.2 (63.0)	19.3 (66.7)	21.8 (71.2)	24.0 (75.2)	23.7 (74.7)	23.0 (73.4)	22.5 (72.5)	19.1 (66.4)	16.0 (60.8)	14.3 (57.7)	19.2 (66.5)
Mean daily minimum °C (°F)	8.1 (46.6)	9.7 (49.5)	11.7 (53.1)	13.5 (56.3)	15.4 (59.7)	17.3 (63.1)	17.8 (64.0)	17.2 (63.0)	15.6 (60.1)	12.3 (54.1)	9.7 (49.5)	7.9 (46.2)	13.0 (55.4)
Record low °C (°F)	0.0 (32.0)	1.2 (34.2)	3.0 (37.4)	6.5 (43.7)	7.0 (44.6)	11.6 (52.9)	9.3 (48.7)	10.1 (50.2)	10.2 (50.4)	5.2 (41.4)	1.4 (34.5)	−2.0 (28.4)	−2.0 (28.4)
Average precipitation mm (inches)	12.9 (0.51)	12.3 (0.48)	44.9 (1.77)	49.0 (1.93)	36.1 (1.42)	18.4 (0.72)	45.8 (1.80)	45.9 (1.81)	16.1 (0.63)	4.3 (0.17)	6.8 (0.27)	2.0 (0.08)	294.5 (11.59)
Average precipitation days (≥ 1.0 mn)	1.4	0.9	1.9	4.7	3.8	1.7	3.5	4.1	1.0	0.7	1.0	0.5	25.3
Average relative humidity (%)	71	72	67	62	54	40	44	53	41	47	62	69	57
Average afternoon relative humidity (%)	56	58	52	47	38	27	34	41	27	31	42	51	42
Mean monthly sunshine hours	266.6	265.6	294.5	282	288.3	276	232.5	238.7	273	291.4	273	266.6	3,248.2
Mean daily sunshine hours	8.6	9.4	9.5	9.4	9.3	9.2	7.5	7.7	9.1	9.4	9.1	8.6	8.9
Source 1: NCEI, Jeddah Regional Climate Center
Source 2: Deutscher Wetterdienst (humidity 1979-1993, sun 2001–2008) (Note: Afternoon humidity was measured at 15:00 local time), Meteomanz(extremes since 2021)

== Gallery ==
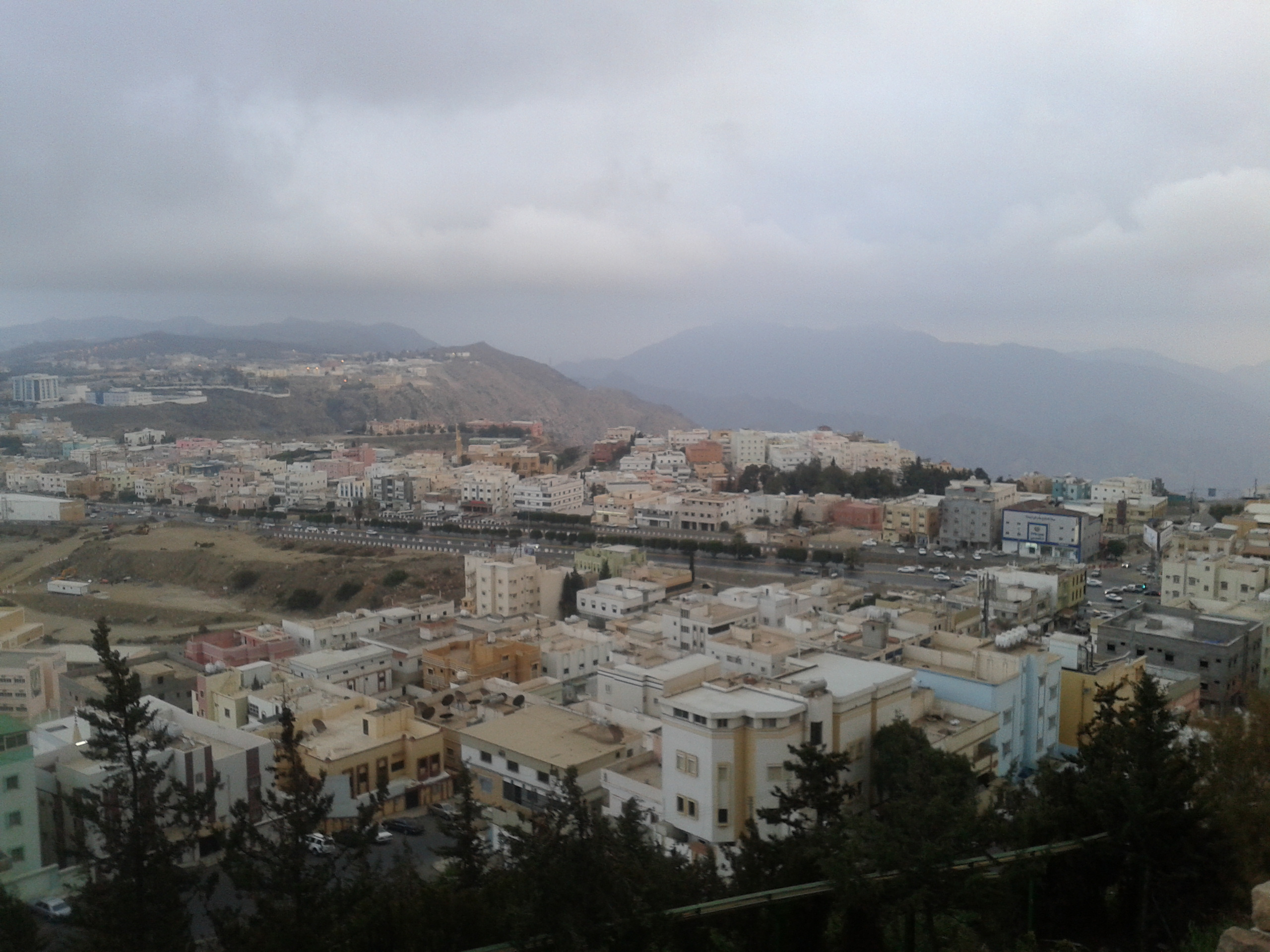
Buildings with the 'Asir Mountains in the background

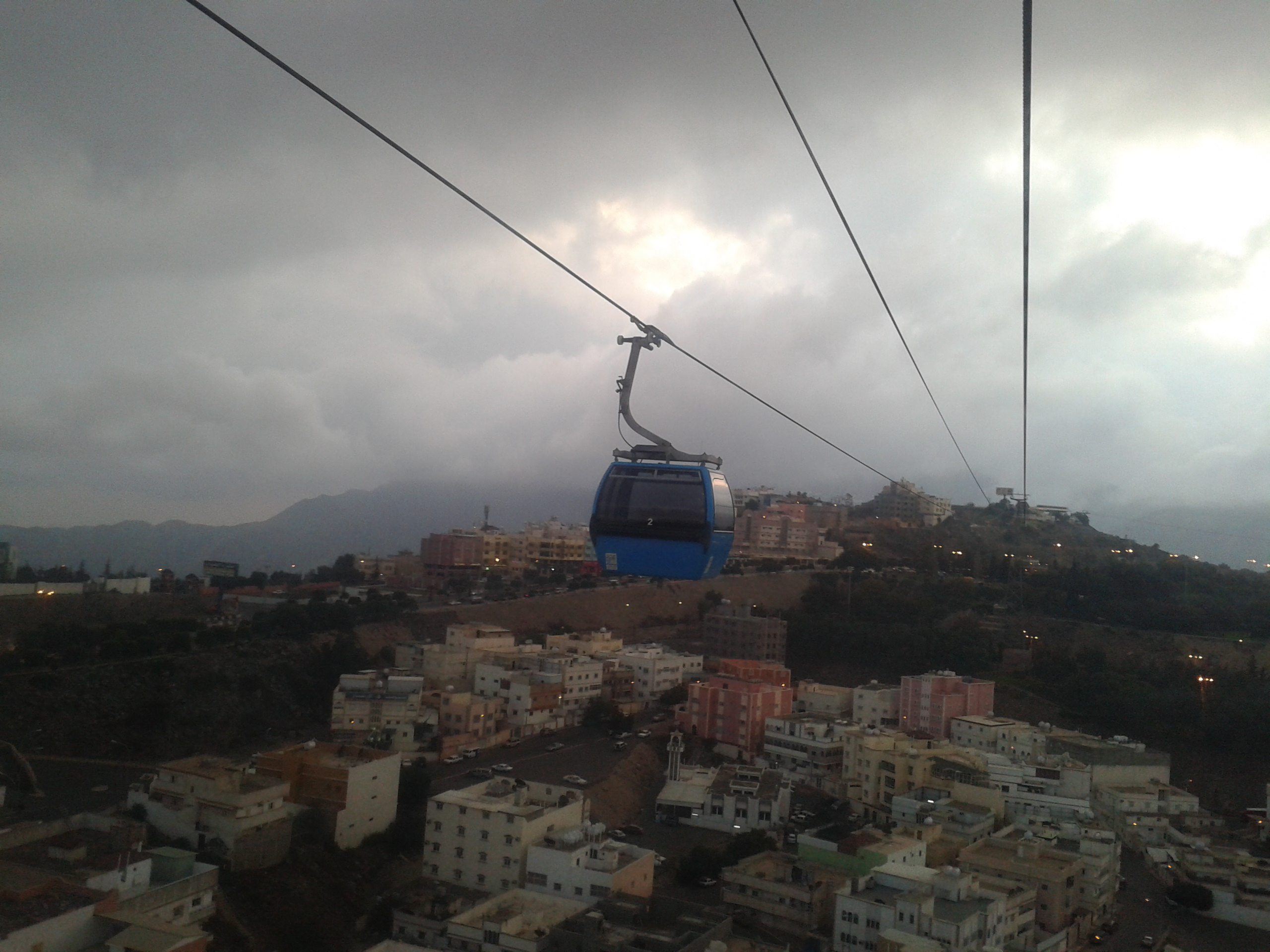
Cable car

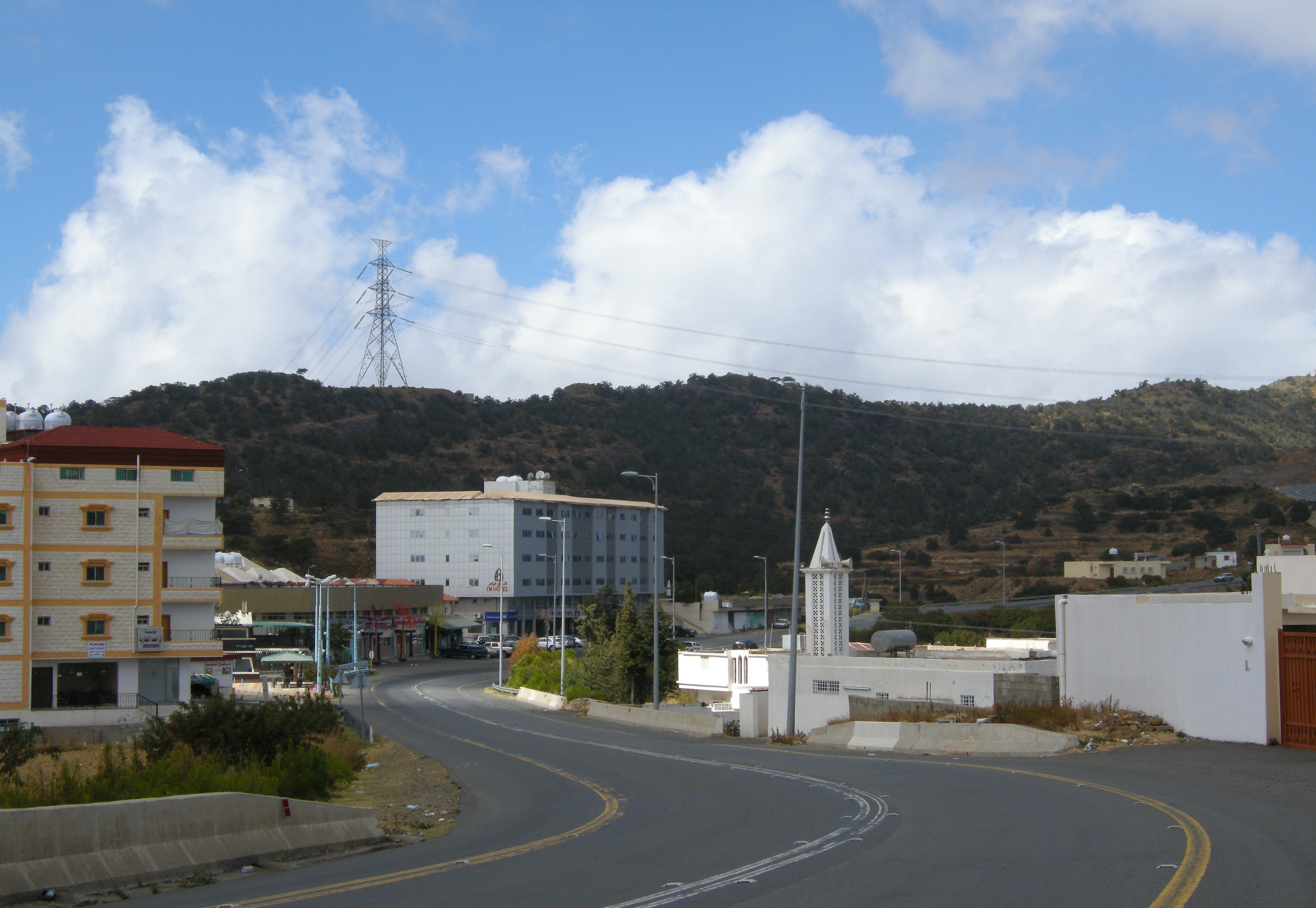

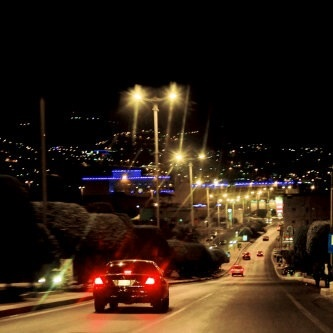
Night drive

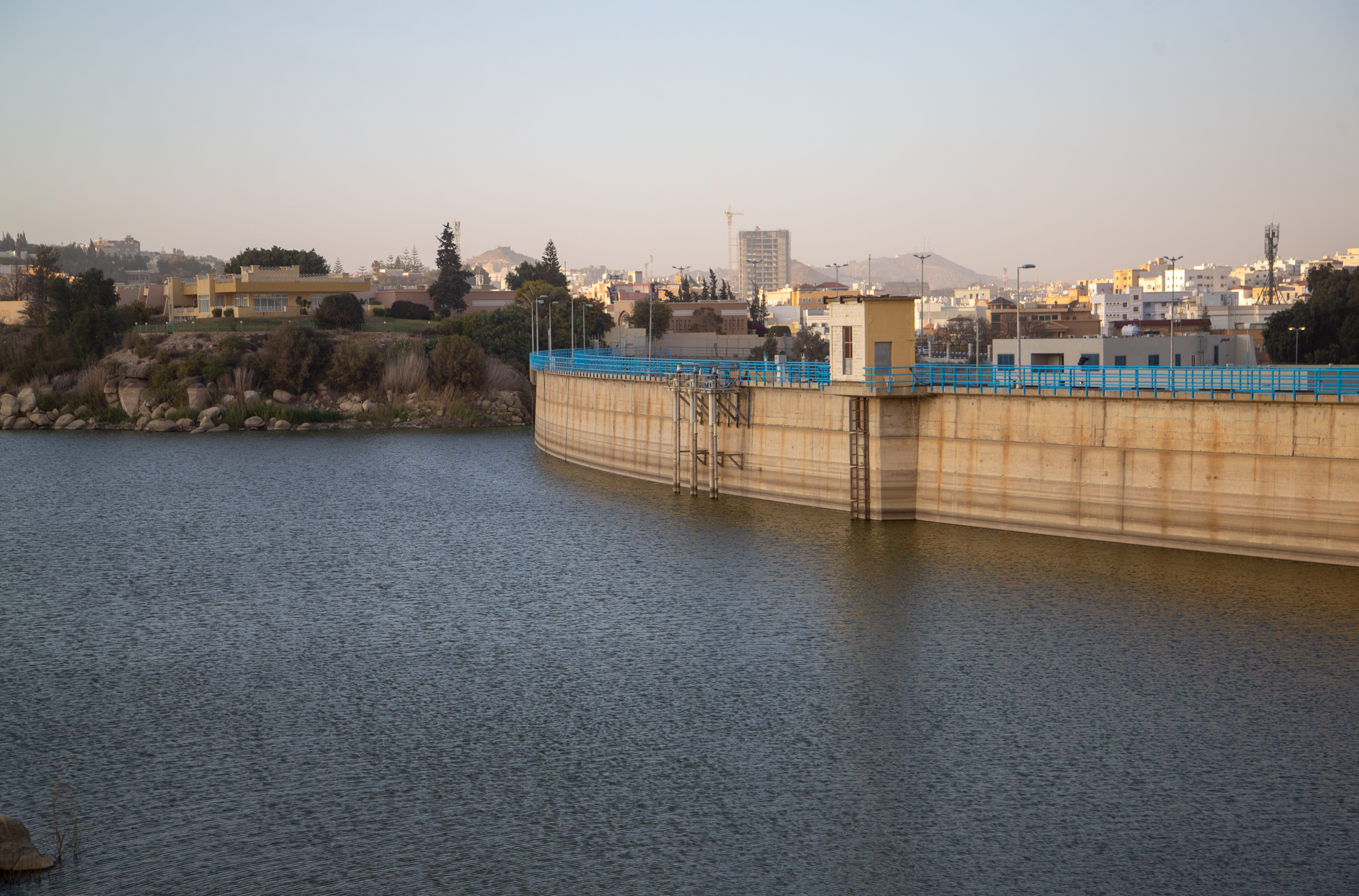
Abha dam

== Ecology ==
The Garf Raydah Protected Area is heavily colonized by olive trees, and junipers.

== See also ==
- Al-Bahah
- An-Namas
- Bareq
- Billasmar Region
- Habala
- Rijal Alma
- Khamis Mushayt
- Tanomah
