= List of mammals of Saudi Arabia =

This is a list of the mammal species present in Saudi Arabia. There are 78 mammal species in Saudi Arabia, of which three are critically endangered, three are endangered, nine are vulnerable, and two are near threatened.

The following tags are used to highlight each species' conservation status as assessed by the International Union for Conservation of Nature:

EX	Extinct	No reasonable doubt that the last individual has died.
EW	Extinct in the wild	Known only to survive in captivity or as a naturalized populations well outside its previous range.
CR	Critically endangered	The species is in imminent risk of extinction in the wild.
EN	Endangered	The species is facing an extremely high risk of extinction in the wild.
VU	Vulnerable	The species is facing a high risk of extinction in the wild.
NT	Near threatened	The species does not meet any of the criteria that would categorise it as risking extinction but it is likely to do so in the future.
LC	Least concern	There are no current identifiable risks to the species.
DD	Data deficient	There is inadequate information to make an assessment of the risks to this species.

== Order: Hyracoidea (hyraxes) ==
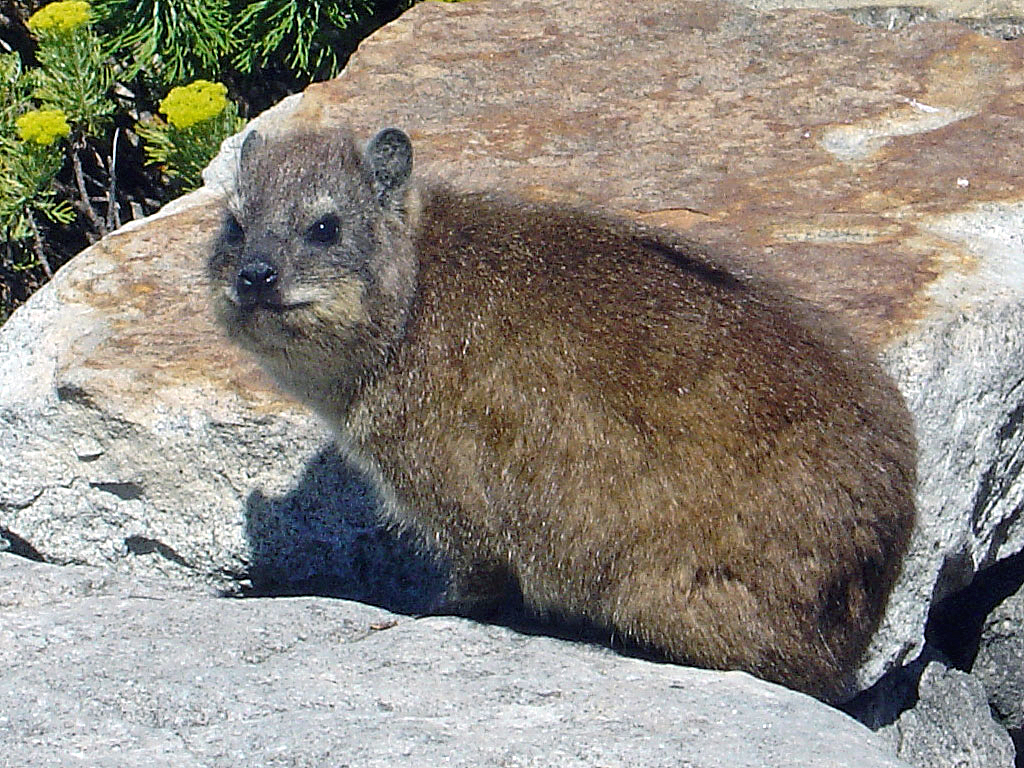
Cape hyrax

The hyraxes are any of four species of fairly small, thickset, herbivorous mammals in the order Hyracoidea. About the size of a domestic cat they are well-furred, with rounded bodies and a stumpy tail. They are native to Africa and the Middle East.

- Family: Procaviidae (hyraxes)
  - Genus: Procavia
    - Cape hyrax, Procavia capensis LC

== Order: Sirenia (manatees and dugongs) ==
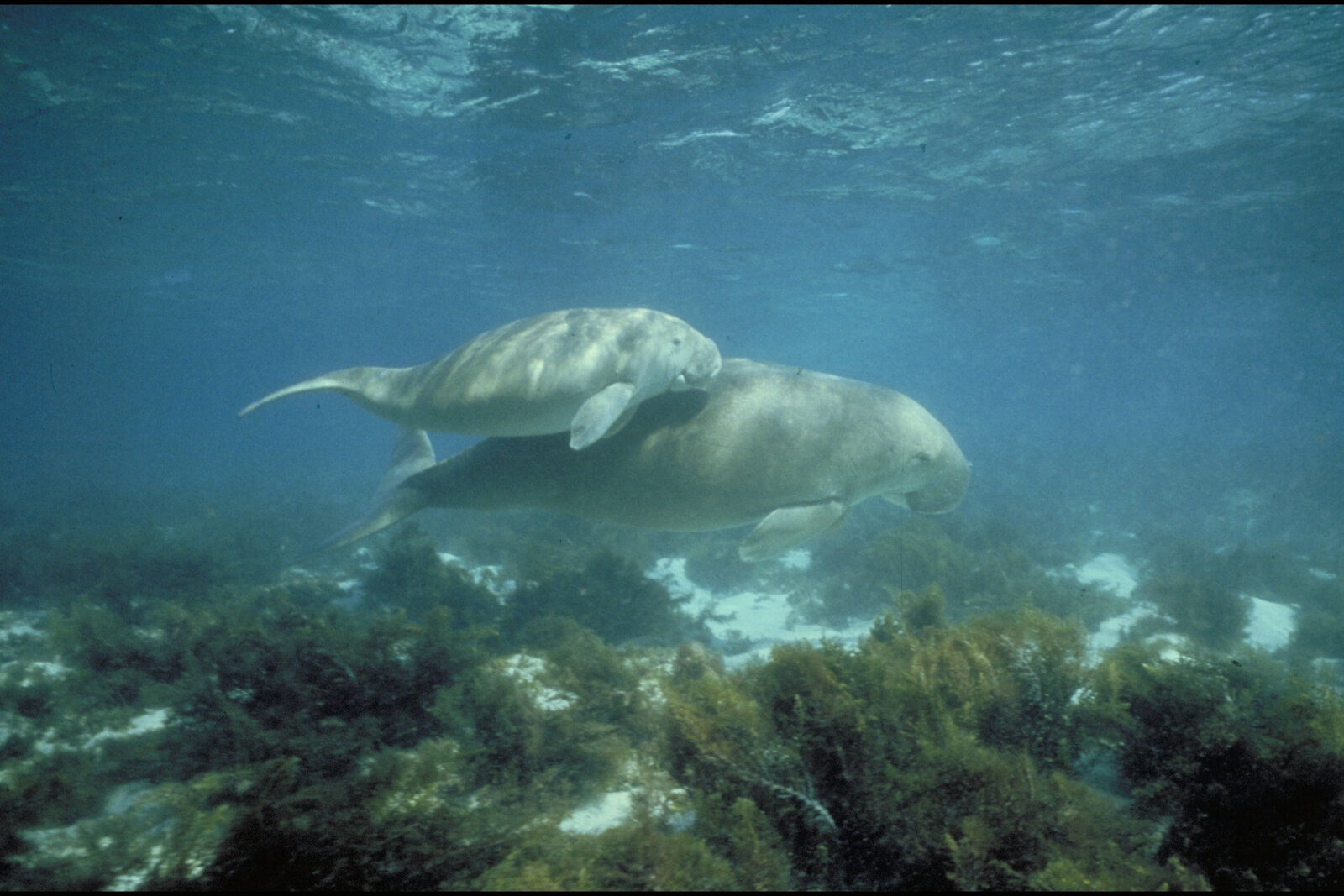
Dugongs

Sirenia is an order of fully aquatic, herbivorous mammals that inhabit rivers, estuaries, coastal marine waters, swamps, and marine wetlands. All four species are endangered.

- Family: Dugongidae
  - Genus: Dugong
    - Dugong, Dugong dugon VU

== Order: Primates ==
The order Primates contains humans and their closest relatives: lemurs, lorisoids, monkeys, and apes.

- Suborder: Haplorhini
  - Infraorder: Simiiformes
    - Parvorder: Catarrhini
      - Superfamily: Cercopithecoidea
        - Family: Cercopithecidae (Old World monkeys)
          - Genus: Papio
            - Hamadryas baboon, Papio hamadryas LC

== Order: Rodentia (rodents) ==
Rodents make up the largest order of mammals, with over 40% of mammalian species. They have two incisors in the upper and lower jaw which grow continually and must be kept short by gnawing. Most rodents are small though the capybara can weigh up to 45 kg (99 lb).

- Suborder: Hystricognathi
  - Family: Hystricidae (Old World porcupines)
    - Genus: Hystrix
      - Indian porcupine, Hystrix indica LC
- Suborder: Sciurognathi
  - Family: Gliridae (dormice)
    - Subfamily: Leithiinae
      - Genus: Eliomys
        - Asian garden dormouse, Eliomys melanurus LC
  - Family: Dipodidae (jerboas)
    - Subfamily: Allactaginae
      - Genus: Allactaga
        - Euphrates jerboa, Allactaga euphratica LC
    - Subfamily: Dipodinae
      - Genus: Jaculus
        - Lesser Egyptian jerboa, Jaculus jaculus LC
        - Greater Egyptian jerboa, Jaculus orientalis LC
  - Family: Muridae (mice, rats, voles, gerbils, hamsters, etc.)
    - Subfamily: Deomyinae
      - Genus: Acomys
        - Cairo spiny mouse, Acomys cahirinus LC
        - Golden spiny mouse, Acomys russatus LC
    - Subfamily: Gerbillinae
      - Genus: Gerbillus
        - Cheesman's gerbil, Gerbillus cheesmani LC
        - Wagner's gerbil, Gerbillus dasyurus LC
        - Pygmy gerbil, Gerbillus henleyi LC
        - Balochistan gerbil, Gerbillus nanus LC
        - Large Aden gerbil, Gerbillus poecilops LC
      - Genus: Meriones
        - Arabian jird, Meriones arimalius EN
        - Sundevall's jird, Meriones crassus LC
        - Libyan jird, Meriones libycus LC
        - King jird, Meriones rex LC
      - Genus: Psammomys
        - Sand rat, Psammomys obesus LC
      - Genus: Sekeetamys
        - Bushy-tailed jird, Sekeetamys calurus LC
    - Subfamily: Murinae
      - Genus: Apodemus
        - Broad-toothed field mouse, Apodemus mystacinus LC
      - Genus: Arvicanthis
        - African grass rat, Arvicanthis niloticus LC
      - Genus: Myomyscus
        - Yemeni mouse, Myomys yemeni LC
      - Genus: Nesokia
        - Short-tailed bandicoot rat, Nesokia indica LC

== Order: Lagomorpha (lagomorphs) ==
Lagomorphs comprise rabbits, hares, and pikas. Unlike rodents, they have four incisors on their upper jaws.

- Family: Leporidae (rabbits and hares)
  - Genus: Lepus
    - Cape hare, L. capensis LC

== Order: Erinaceomorpha (hedgehogs and gymnures) ==
The order Erinaceomorpha contains a single family, Erinaceidae, which comprise the hedgehogs and gymnures. The hedgehogs are easily recognised by their spines, while gymnures look more like large rats.

- Family: Erinaceidae (hedgehogs)
  - Subfamily: Erinaceinae
    - Genus: Paraechinus
      - Desert hedgehog, Paraechinus aethiopicus LC

== Order: Chiroptera (bats) ==
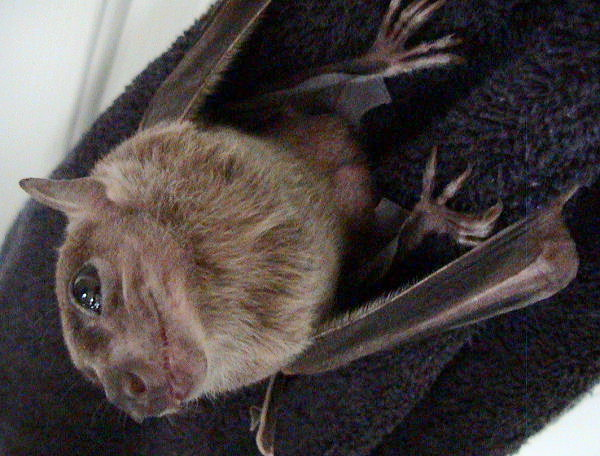
Egyptian fruit bat

The bats' most distinguishing feature is that their forelimbs are developed as wings, making them the only mammals capable of flight. Bat species account for about 20% of all mammals.

- Family: Pteropodidae (flying foxes, Old World fruit bats)
  - Subfamily: Pteropodinae
    - Genus: Eidolon
      - Straw-coloured fruit bat, Eidolon helvum NT
    - Genus: Rousettus
      - Egyptian fruit bat, Rousettus aegyptiacus LC
- Family: Vespertilionidae
  - Subfamily: Myotinae
    - Genus: Myotis
      - Geoffroy's bat, Myotis emarginatus LC
  - Subfamily: Vespertilioninae
    - Genus: Eptesicus
      - Botta's serotine, Eptesicus bottae LC
    - Genus: Hypsugo
      - Bodenheimer's pipistrelle, Hypsugo bodenheimeri DD
    - Genus: Nycticeinops
      - Schlieffen's twilight bat, Nycticeinops schlieffeni LC
    - Genus: Otonycteris
      - Desert long-eared bat, Otonycteris hemprichii LC
    - Genus: Pipistrellus
      - Kuhl's pipistrelle, Pipistrellus kuhlii LC
    - Genus: Plecotus
      - Grey long-eared bat, Plecotus austriacus LC
    - Genus: Rhyneptesicus
      - Sind bat, Rhyneptesicus nasutus LC
  - Subfamily: Miniopterinae
    - Genus: Miniopterus
      - Common bent-wing bat, Miniopterus schreibersii VU
- Family: Rhinopomatidae
  - Genus: Rhinopoma
    - Egyptian mouse-tailed bat, Rhinopoma cystops LC
    - Lesser mouse-tailed bat, Rhinopoma hardwickei LC
    - Greater mouse-tailed bat, Rhinopoma microphyllum LC
- Family: Molossidae
  - Genus: Chaerephon
    - Nigerian free-tailed bat, Chaerephon nigeriae LC
  - Genus: Mops
    - Midas free-tailed bat, Mops midas LC
  - Genus: Tadarida
    - Egyptian free-tailed bat, Tadarida aegyptiaca LC
    - European free-tailed bat, Tadarida teniotis LC
- Family: Emballonuridae
  - Genus: Taphozous
    - Egyptian tomb bat, Taphozous perforatus LC
- Family: Nycteridae
  - Genus: Nycteris
    - Egyptian slit-faced bat, Nycteris thebaica LC
- Family: Rhinolophidae
  - Subfamily: Rhinolophinae
    - Genus: Rhinolophus
      - Geoffroy's horseshoe bat, Rhinolophus clivosus LC
      - Greater horseshoe bat, Rhinolophus ferrumequinum LC
      - Lesser horseshoe bat, Rhinolophus hipposideros LC
  - Subfamily: Hipposiderinae
    - Genus: Asellia
      - Patrizi's trident leaf-nosed bat, Asellia patrizii VU
      - Trident leaf-nosed bat, Asellia tridens LC
    - Genus: Hipposideros
      - Ethiopian large-eared roundleaf bat, Hipposideros megalotis LC

== Order: Cetacea (whales) ==
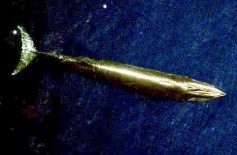
Bryde's whale

The order Cetacea includes whales, dolphins and porpoises. They are the mammals most fully adapted to aquatic life with a spindle-shaped nearly hairless body, protected by a thick layer of blubber, and forelimbs and tail modified to provide propulsion underwater.

- Suborder: Mysticeti
  - Family: Balaenopteridae
    - Subfamily: Balaenopterinae
      - Genus: Balaenoptera
        - Fin whale, Balaenoptera physalus EN
        - Sei whale, Balaenoptera borealis EN
        - Bryde's whale, Balaenoptera edeni DD
        - Minke whale, Balaenoptera acutorostrata nt
    - Subfamily: Megapterinae
      - Genus: Megaptera
        - Humpback whale, Megaptera novaeangliae CR (Arabian Sea population)
- Suborder: Odontoceti
  - Superfamily: Platanistoidea
    - Family: Phocoenidae
      - Genus: Neophocaena
        - Finless porpoise, Neophocaena phocaenoides DD
    - Family: Kogiidae
      - Genus: Kogia
        - Dwarf sperm whale, Kogia sima LR/lc
    - Family: Ziphiidae
      - Subfamily: Hyperoodontinae
        - Genus: Indopacetus
          - Longman's beaked whale, Indopacetus pacificus DD
    - Family: Delphinidae (marine dolphins)
      - Genus: Steno
        - Rough-toothed dolphin, Steno bredanensis LR/lc
      - Genus: Tursiops
        - Indo-Pacific bottlenose dolphin, Tursiops aduncus DD
        - Common bottlenose dolphin, Tursiops truncatus LR/lc
      - Genus: Sousa
        - Indo-Pacific humpbacked dolphin, Sousa chinensis DD
      - Genus: Stenella
        - Pantropical spotted dolphin, Stenella attenuata LR/cd
        - Striped dolphin, Stenella cueruleoalba LR/lc
        - Spinner dolphin, Stenella longirostris LR/cd
      - Genus: Delphinus
        - Common dolphin, Delphinus capensis LR/lc
      - Genus: Grampus
        - Risso's dolphin, Grampus griseus DD
      - Genus: Feresa
        - Pygmy killer whale, Feresa attenuata DD
      - Genus: Pseudorca
        - False killer whale, Pseudorca crassidens DD

== Order: Carnivora (carnivorans) ==
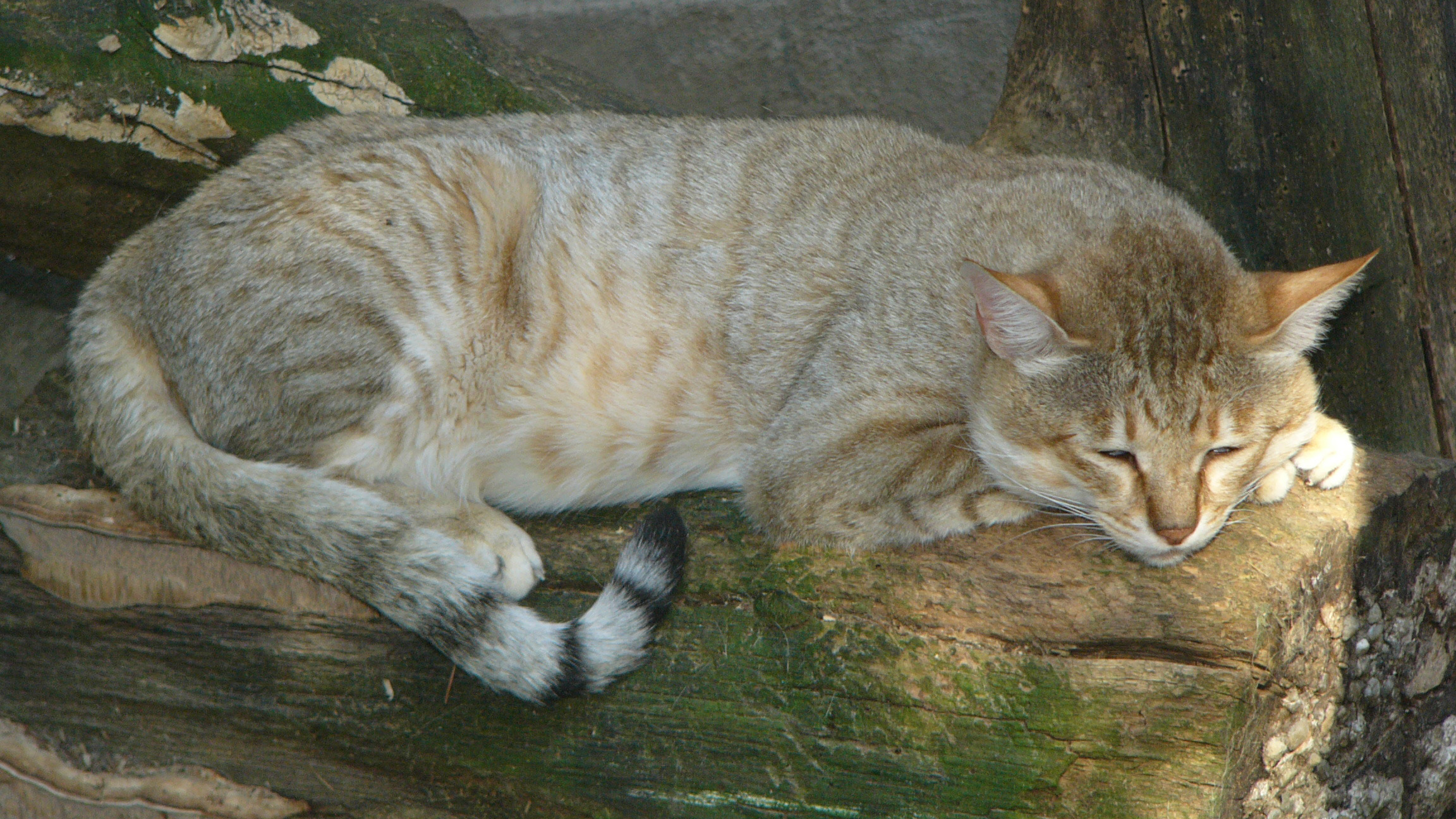
Arabian wildcat

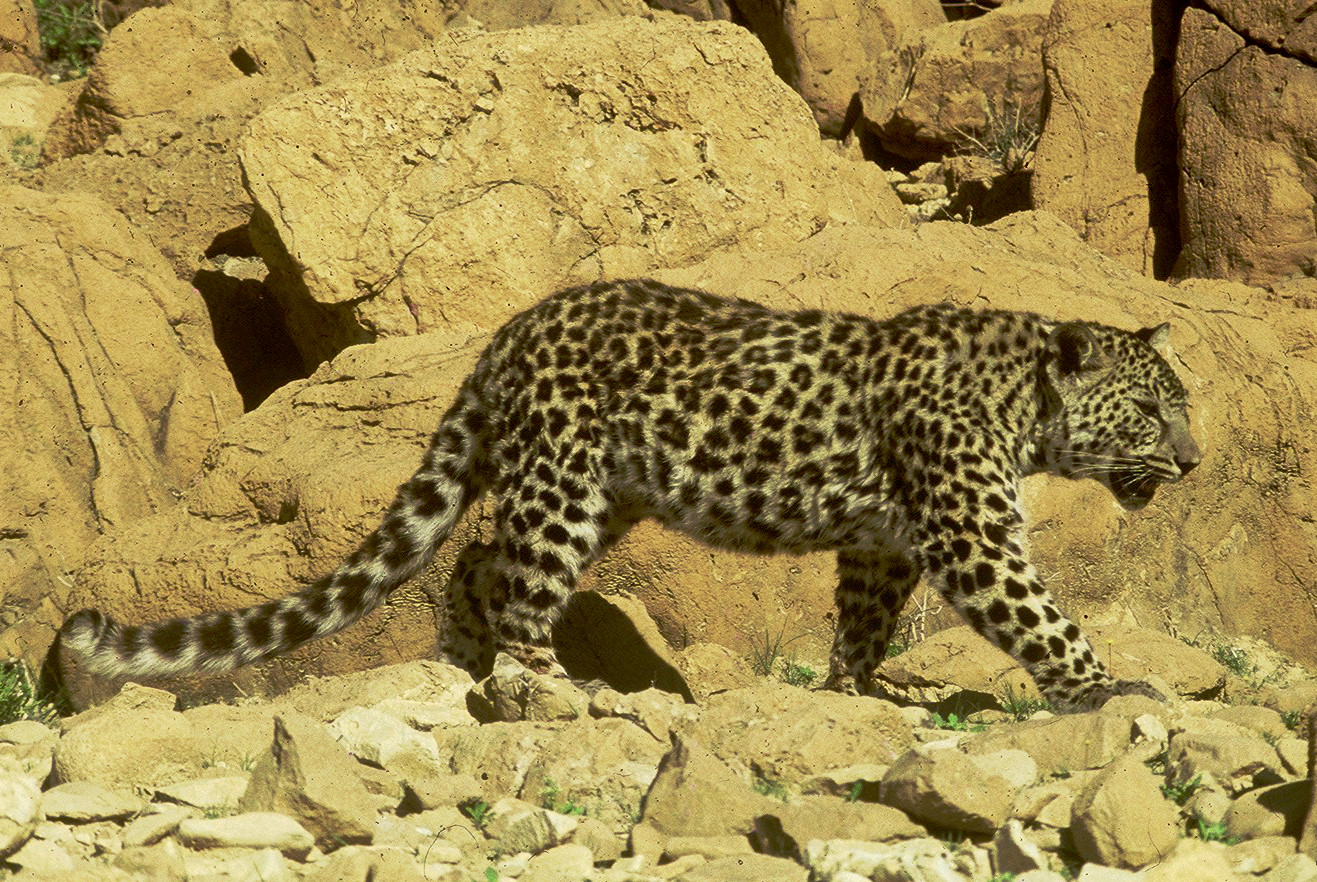
Arabian leopard

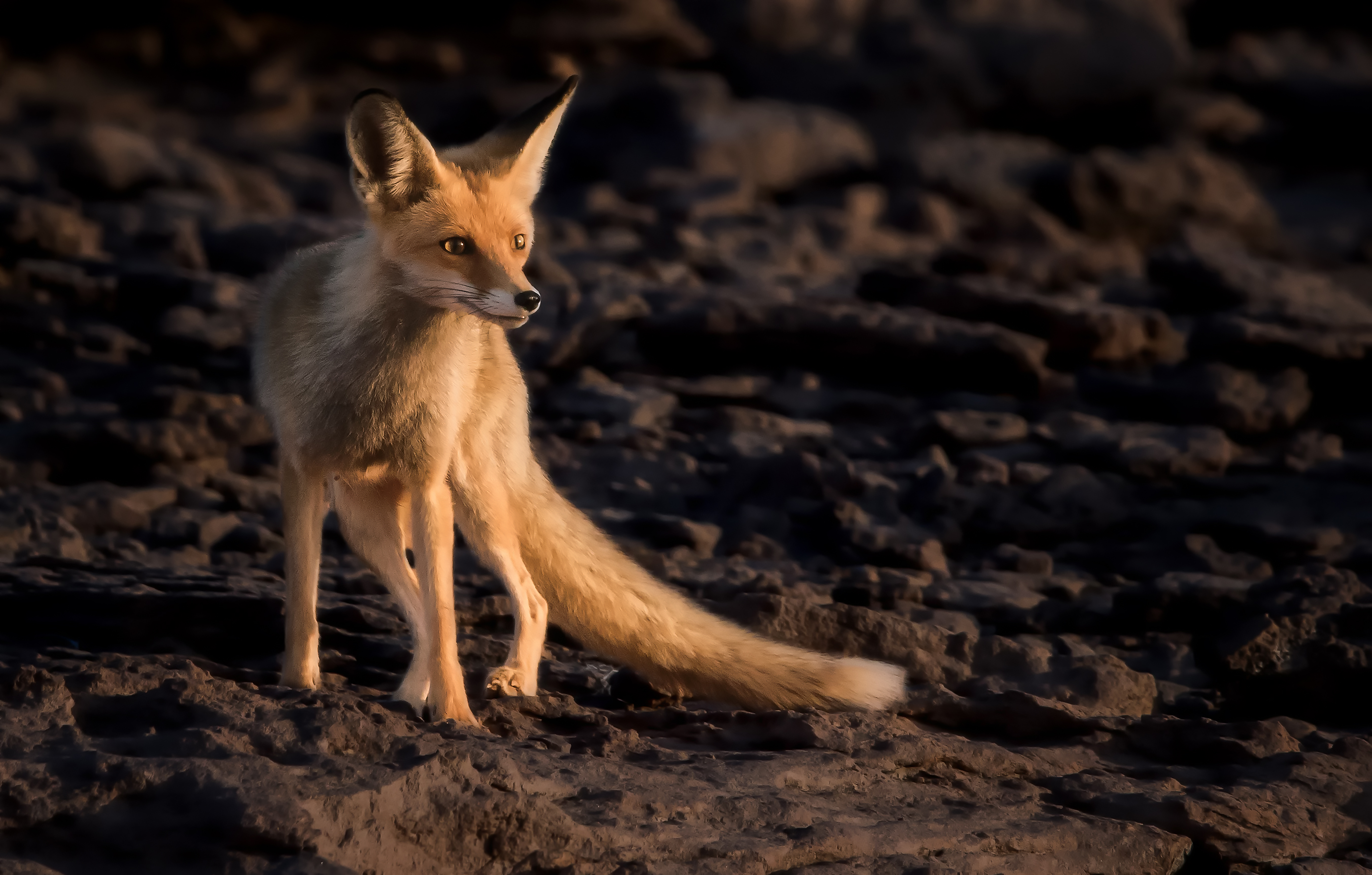
Red fox in Al-Jawf Province

There are over 260 species of carnivorans, the majority of which eat meat as their primary dietary item. They have a characteristic skull shape and dentition.

- Suborder: Feliformia
  - Family: Felidae (cats)
    - Subfamily: Felinae
      - Genus: Caracal
        - Caracal, Caracal caracal LC
      - Genus: Felis
        - African wildcat, Felis lybica LC
        - Sand cat, Felis margarita LC
    - Subfamily: Pantherinae
      - Genus: Panthera
        - Leopard, Panthera pardus VU
          - Arabian leopard, Panthera pardus nimr CR
  - Family: Viverridae
    - Genus: Genetta
      - Common genet, Genetta genetta LC
  - Family: Herpestidae (mongooses)
    - Subfamily: Herpestinae
      - Genus: Urva
        - Indian grey mongoose, Urva edwardsii LC
      - Genus: Ichneumia
        - White-tailed mongoose, Ichneumia albacauda LC
  - Family: Hyaenidae (hyaenas)
    - Genus: Hyaena
      - Striped hyena, Hyaena hyaena LC
- Suborder: Caniformia
  - Family: Canidae (dogs, foxes)
    - Genus: Canis
      - Golden jackal, Canis aureus LC
      - Gray wolf, Canis lupus
        - Arabian wolf, Canis lupus arabs
    - Genus: Vulpes
      - Blanford's fox, Vulpes cana LC
      - Rüppell's fox, Vulpes rueppellii LC
      - Red fox, Vulpes vulpes LC
  - Family: Mustelidae (mustelids)
    - Genus: Mellivora
      - Honey badger, Mellivora capensis LC

== Order: Artiodactyla (even-toed ungulates) ==
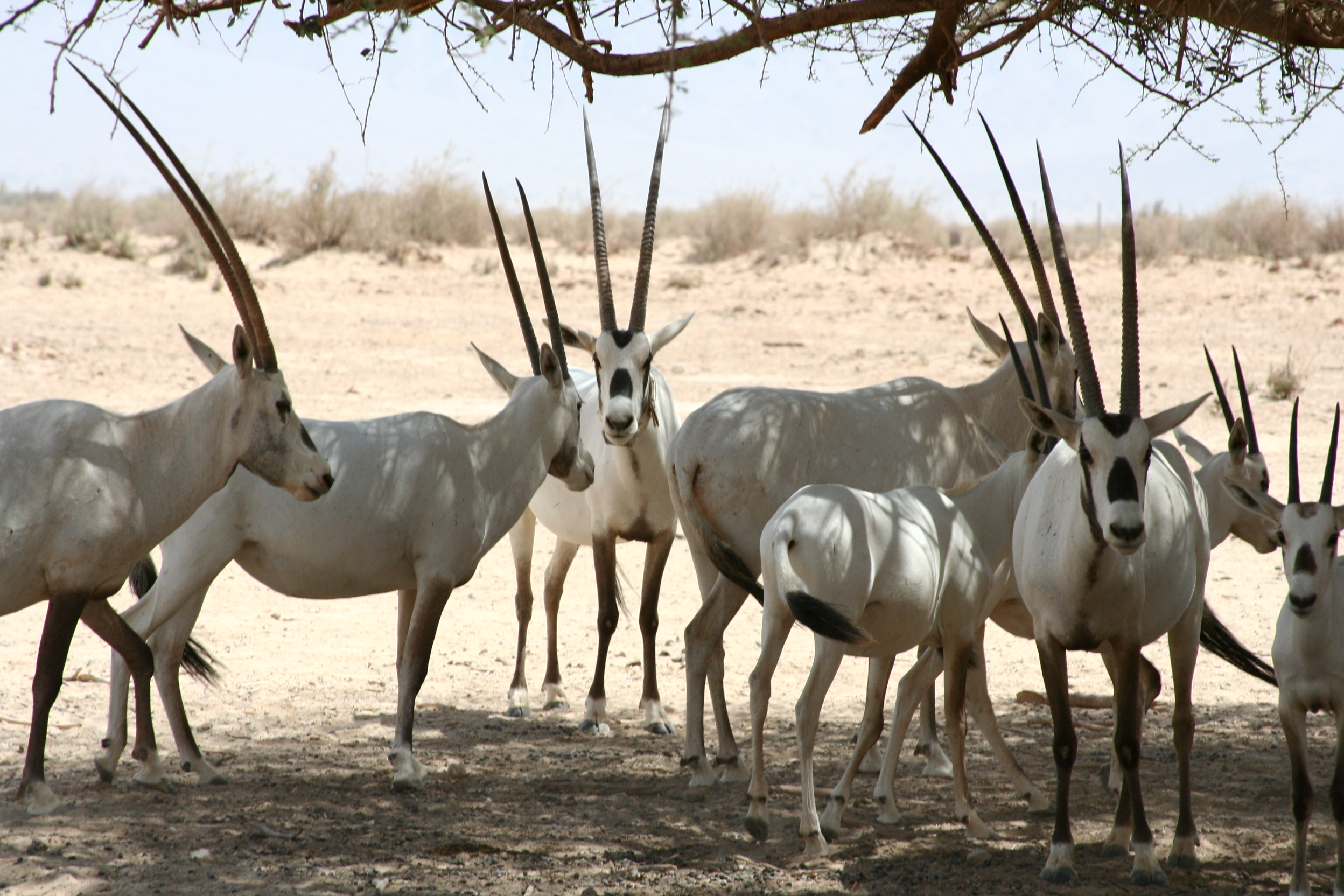
Arabian oryx

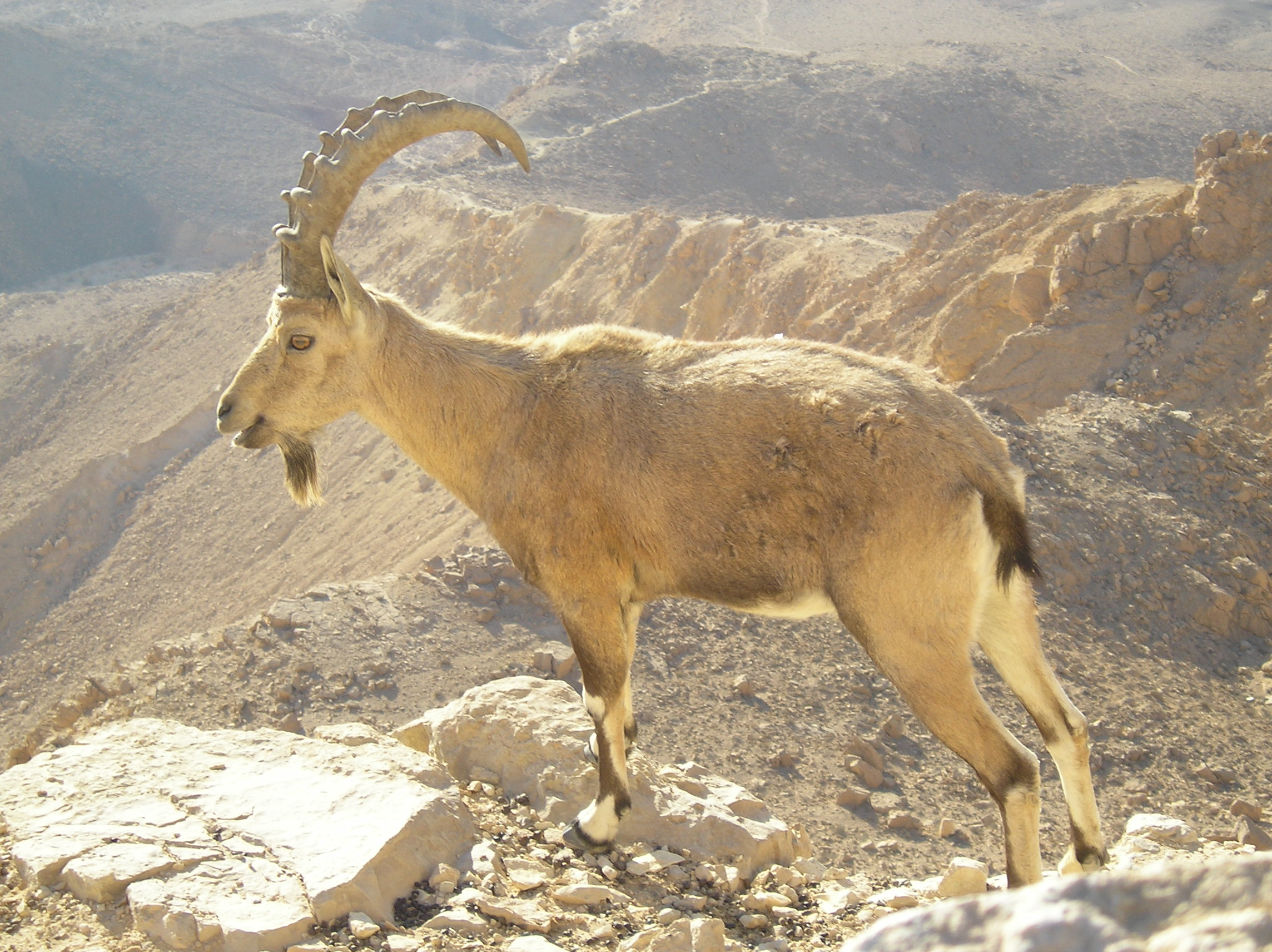
Nubian ibex

The even-toed ungulates are ungulates whose weight is borne about equally by the third and fourth toes, rather than mostly or entirely by the third as in perissodactyls. There are about 220 artiodactyl species, including many that are of great economic importance to humans.

- Family: Bovidae (cattle, antelope, sheep, goats)
  - Subfamily: Antilopinae
    - Genus: Gazella
      - Arabian gazelle, Gazella arabica VU
      - Arabian sand gazelle, Gazella marica VU
  - Subfamily: Caprinae
    - Genus: Capra
      - Nubian ibex, Capra nubiana VU
  - Subfamily: Hippotraginae
    - Genus: Oryx
      - Arabian oryx, Oryx leucoryxVU reintroduced

== Locally extinct ==
The following species are locally extinct in the country:

- Cheetah, Acinonyx jubatus
- Onager, Equus hemionus
- Saudi gazelle, Gazella saudiya
- Lion, Panthera leo

== See also ==
- List of chordate orders
- Lists of mammals by region
- Mammal classification
- Wildlife of Saudi Arabia
