= Habala =

Human settlement in Saudi Arabia

Coordinates: 18.03808°N 42.87266°E

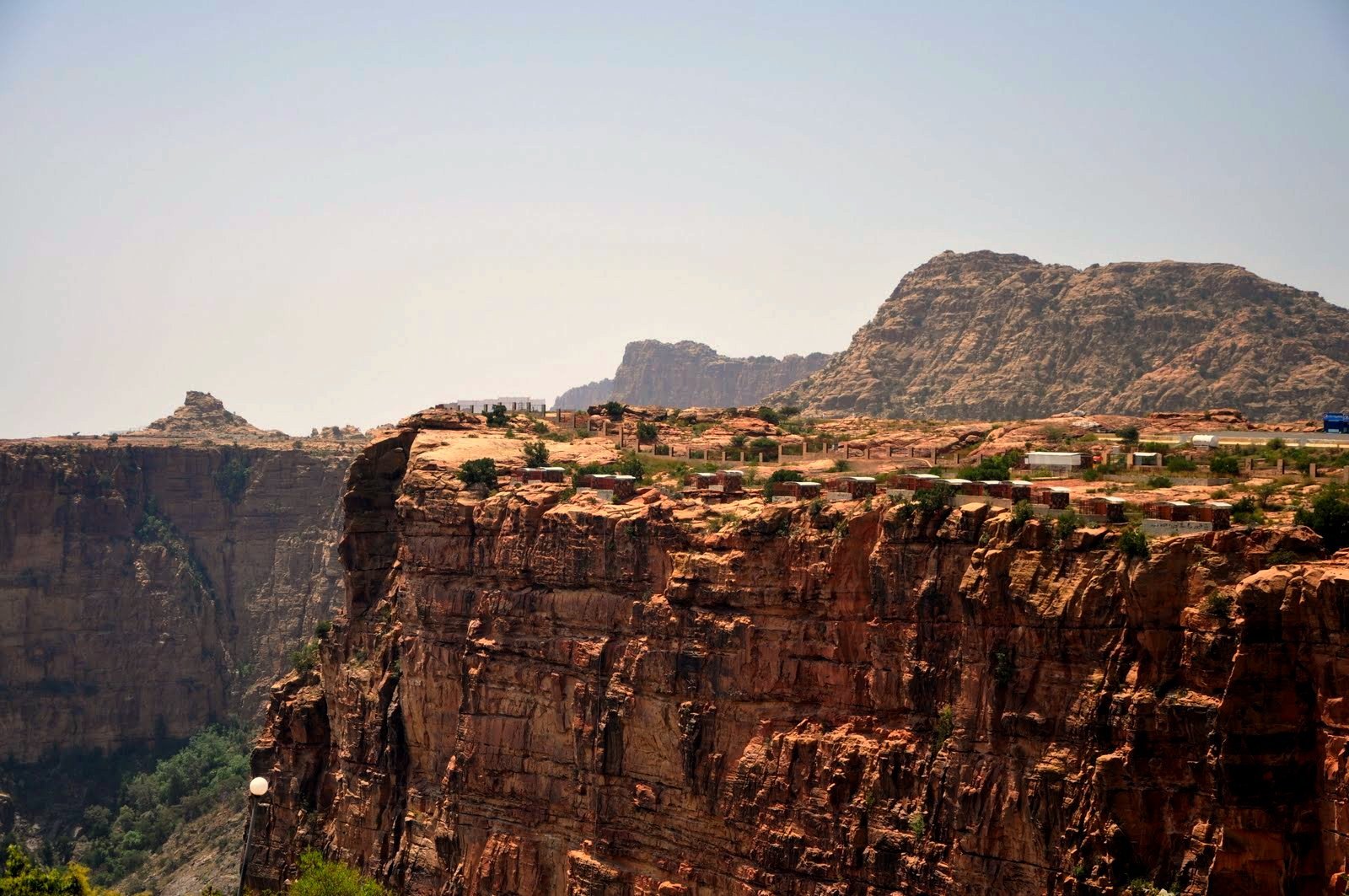
Habala Valley near Abha in the Asir Mountains of Saudi Arabia

Habala (Arabic: ٱلْحَبَلَة, romanized: Al-Ḥabalah) is a small mountain village in 'Asir Region of Saudi Arabia. It can be reached by car from Abha within one hour. It is located in a valley almost 300 metres below the peak of the front mountain. It was originally inhabited by a tribal community known as the "flower men" because of their custom of wearing garlands of dried herbs and flowers in their hair. In the past, the village was only accessible by rope ladder, and in fact, the name Habala comes from the Arabic word for rope. They were supposedly fleeing the Turks at the time of the Ottoman Empire.

In the 1990s, during a push to promote tourism in the region, a cable car was built to provide access to the traditional village with its stark mountain views. In consequence, however, the local "flower men" were dispossessed of their homes and forced to move into a modern village created for them in the valley below. When they refused to move, they were evacuated forcibly by the Saudi Arabian National Guard. Today, some of the original inhabitants are allowed back up to the village, but only to perform their traditional dances for tourists during the summer months.

Another scenic area, although isolated, is northwards along the escarpment from Habalah. Here three great pillars of rock stand away from the edge of the escarpment. One, with a top shaped like Cleopatra's needle, is supposed to make a poet of anyone who can stay there all night without becoming insane. The others are flat topped with a green sward and on one are the remains of house foundations as well as many cairns arranged like sentinels along the edge of the sheer cliff."

— Trevor, 1983

Visiting Habala

Located about an hour's drive from Abha, Habala is accessible for visits daily by tourists. The cable car runs from about 10am - 6pm during the high season and 2pm - 6pm during the low season. Many of the traditional buildings in village have been converted for use as restaurants/cafes during the high season. Two areas of the village are accessible to tourists, with the main area near the exit from the cable car and a trail leading to a separate section with additional buildings that serve as a museum during the high tourist season.

== See also ==
- Sarawat Mountains
