= As-Sūda =

Village in the Abha region of Saudi Arabia

as-Sūda السُّودَة
- Location within Saudi Arabia
- Country: Saudi Arabia
- Province: Asir Province
- Elevation: 2,800 m (9,200 ft)
- Time zone: UTC+3 (EAT)
  - Summer (DST): UTC+3 (EAT)
- Website: soudah.sa/en

as-Sūda (Arabic: السُّودَة) is a mountainous area in the Asir Province of Saudi Arabia. At an elevation of 3,207 metres (10,522 ft) with a prominence of 3,015 metres (9,892 ft) above sea level, it includes Saudi Arabia's highest peak, Jabal as-Sūda. The area is known for its dense Juniper tree covered mountains.

== Climate ==
The climate of as-Sūda is moderate throughout the year with temperatures rarely exceeding 25 °C (77 °F) in the summer and not rising to more than 15 °C (59 °F) in the winter. Due to Soudah's altitude, the climate is around 10 °C (18 °F) cooler than the rest of Saudi Arabia.

Overall, the area enjoys a cool variation of semi-arid climate (BSk) that borders a regionally rare warm-summer Mediterranean climate (Csb) due to the presence of a brief yet unnoticeable wet season that lasts from February to April.

Climate data for Sawda (2500m)
| Month | Jan | Feb | Mar | Apr | May | Jun | Jul | Aug | Sep | Oct | Nov | Dec | Year |
|---|---|---|---|---|---|---|---|---|---|---|---|---|---|
| Mean daily maximum °C (°F) | 10.8 (51.4) | 14.8 (58.6) | 17.0 (62.6) | 20.2 (68.4) | 22.8 (73.0) | 25.9 (78.6) | 24.8 (76.6) | 24.5 (76.1) | 24.0 (75.2) | 18.0 (64.4) | 17.0 (62.6) | 14.8 (58.6) | 20.3 (68.5) |
| Daily mean °C (°F) | 4.0 (39.2) | 8.0 (46.4) | 11.5 (52.7) | 13.3 (55.9) | 15.7 (60.3) | 18.2 (64.8) | 18.3 (64.9) | 18.2 (64.8) | 16.3 (61.3) | 12.6 (54.7) | 9.8 (49.6) | 8.2 (46.8) | 11 (52) |
| Mean daily minimum °C (°F) | −2 (28) | 1.7 (35.1) | 2.3 (36.1) | 5.3 (41.5) | 8.6 (47.5) | 10.5 (50.9) | 11.8 (53.2) | 12.0 (53.6) | 8.6 (47.5) | 5.2 (41.4) | 2.7 (36.9) | 1.2 (34.2) | 6.4 (43.5) |
| Average precipitation mm (inches) | 18 (0.7) | 40 (1.6) | 63 (2.5) | 70 (2.8) | 28 (1.1) | 2 (0.1) | 29 (1.1) | 46 (1.8) | 8 (0.3) | 10 (0.4) | 10 (0.4) | 9 (0.4) | 332 (13.1) |
Source: Climate-data.org

== Tourism ==
The town is a tourist center, and has a cable car to the top of the mountain. Some people in the area claim to have seen snow fall in more than one season per year.

On September 25th, 2023, Saudi Crown Prince Mohammed Bin Salman announced the as-Sūda peaks project as part of Saudi Vision 2030. The as-Sūda Peaks project will seek to develop a luxury mountain tourism destination in the region worth a projected $7.732 billion to the country's GDP. The project aims to attract 2 million tourists throughout the year by 2033.

== Culture ==
as-Sūda has a distinct culture, geography and its verdant nature that differs slightly from other parts of Saudi Arabia. The dress of the region is unique, traditionally women in as-Sūda have been known to wear colourful headbands and the men flower head wreaths.

== See also ==
- Saudi Vision 2030
- Aseer
- Jabal as-Sūda
- Rijal Almaa
