= List of cockroaches of Saudi Arabia =

This is a list of cockroaches of Saudi Arabia, including both indigenous and non-indigenous species.

== Order Blattodea ==
=== Family Blattelidae ===
- Blattella biligata
- Blattella germanica German cockroach
- Loboptera isolata
- Supella longipalpa brown-banded cockroach
- Supella orientalis
- Supellina biquandi

=== Family Blattidae ===
- Blatta orientalis Oriental cockroach
- Periplaneta americana American cockroach
- Shelfordella arabica
- Shelfordella lateralis Turkestan cockroach

=== Family Polyphagidae ===
- Heterogamisca chopardi
- Polyphaga aegyptiaca Egyptian desert cockroach
- Heterogamisca dispersa
- Heterogamisca marmorata

== See also ==
- Blattodea
- Blattelidae
- Blattidae
- Polyphagidae
