= Jabal as-Sūda =

Mountain in Saudi Arabia

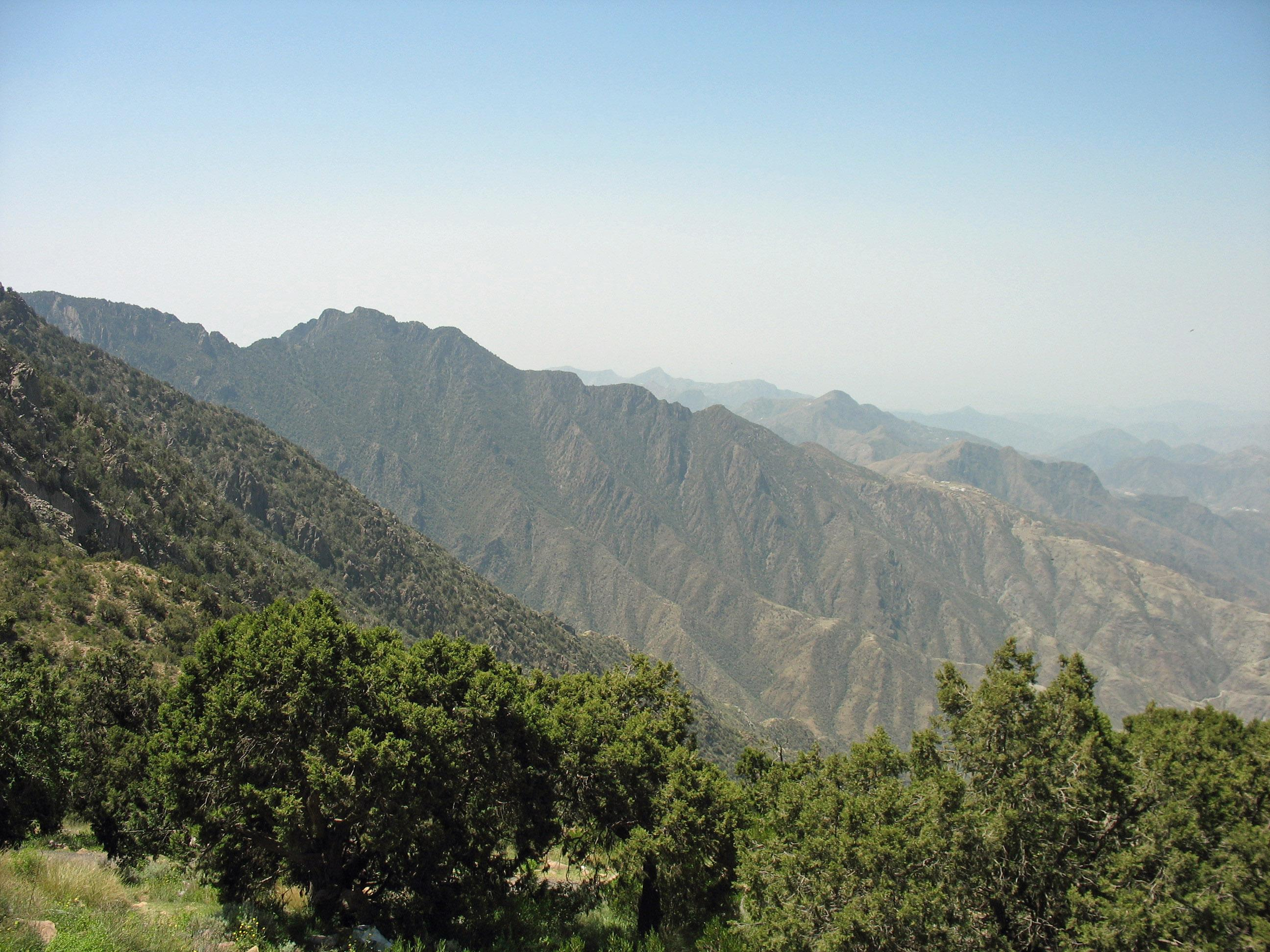

Highest point
- Elevation: 3,207 m (10,522 ft)
- Prominence: 3,015 m (9,892 ft); Ranked 90th
- Listing: Country high point Ultra, Ribu
- Coordinates: 18°16′00″N 42°22′06″E

Naming
- Native name: جَبَلُ ٱلسُّودَة (in Arabic)

Geography
- Location within Saudi Arabia
- Location: Saudi Arabia
- Parent range: Asir Mountains

Jabal Soudah (Arabic: جَبَلُ ٱلسُّودَة jabal us-sūda, pronounced [d͡ʒa.bal us.suː.da]) is a peak in the Asir Mountains in Saudi Arabia. Jabal as-Sūda is officially recognised by the Saudi authorities as the highest point in Saudi Arabia, with an elevation of 3,207 metres (10,522 ft) and a prominence of 3,015 metres (9,892 ft), though a 2018 survey for Jabal Ferwa measured an elevation of 3,002 metres (9,849 ft), with a prominence slightly lower at 2,999 metres (9,839 ft).

The town of as-Sūda is located nearby Asir National Park. The nearby city of Abha is a tourist centre and has a cable car to the top of the mountain.

== Climate ==
Climate data for Soudah (2,946 metres or 9,665 feet)
Month	Jan	Feb	Mar	Apr	May	Jun	Jul	Aug	Sep	Oct	Nov	Dec	Year
Mean daily maximum °C (°F)	14.8 (58.6)	16.1 (61.0)	18.0 (64.4)	20.2 (68.4)	22.8 (73.0)	25.9 (78.6)	24.8 (76.6)	24.5 (76.1)	24.0 (75.2)	20.0 (68.0)	17.0 (62.6)	15.2 (59.4)	20.3 (68.5)
Daily mean °C (°F)	8.2 (46.8)	9.4 (48.9)	11.5 (52.7)	13.3 (55.9)	15.7 (60.3)	18.2 (64.8)	18.3 (64.9)	18.2 (64.8)	16.3 (61.3)	12.6 (54.7)	9.8 (49.6)	8.2 (46.8)	13.3 (55.9)
Mean daily minimum °C (°F)	1.7 (35.1)	2.7 (36.9)	5.1 (41.2)	6.5 (43.7)	8.6 (47.5)	10.5 (50.9)	11.8 (53.2)	12.0 (53.6)	8.6 (47.5)	5.2 (41.4)	2.7 (36.9)	1.2 (34.2)	6.4 (43.5)
Average precipitation mm (inches)	18 (0.7)	40 (1.6)	63 (2.5)	70 (2.8)	28 (1.1)	7 (0.3)	20 (0.8)	7 (0.3)	8 (0.3)	4 (0.2)	10 (0.4)	18 (0.7)	332 (13.1)
Source: Climate-data.org

== Soudah Peaks ==
On 25 September 2023, Saudi Crown Prince Mohammed Bin Salman announced Soudah Peaks Project. Al Soudah Peaks is a luxury mountain tourism destination 3,015 meters above sea level. The project is part of Saudi Vision 2030 and is expected to contribute $7.732 billion to Saudi's GDP and generate thousands of jobs. The project aims to attract 2 million tourists throughout the year by 2033.

== See also ==
- Geology of Saudi Arabia
- Geography of Saudi Arabia
- List of elevation extremes by country
- Wildlife of Saudi Arabia
- List of mountains in Saudi Arabia
