= Houthi–Saudi conflict =

Armed conflict in the Arabian Peninsula

- Part of the spillover of the Yemeni Civil War and the Saudi-led intervention in Yemen
- Current political and military control in ongoing Yemeni Civil War (2014–present) and Yemen Republic of Yemen (internationally recognized), Yemeni Armed Forces and GPC allies Houthi movement
Date	2 April 2015 – present (11 years, 7 months, 1 week and 6 days)
Location	Yemen and Saudi Arabia
Status	Ongoing; Ceasefire declared on March 30, 2022; Escalation during the 2026 Iran War
Territorial changes	Saudi-led coalition and the UN-recognized Yemeni government control all of former South Yemen, Marib Governorate, as well as parts of northern Yemeni Governorates of Saada, Al-Jawf, Hajjah, Al Hudaydah, and Taiz. (see also a detailed map)

Belligerents
Saudi Arabia	Houthis; (Yemen) Supreme Political Council (SPC)

Commanders and leaders
Muhammad bin Salman; Awad Al-Balawi; Muhammad Al Shaalan †; Ibrahim Hamzi †; Abdulrahman al-Shahrani †; (Saudi Arabia) Hassan Ageeli †; (Saudi Arabia) Abdullah al-Balwi †	(Houthis) Abdul-Malik al-Houthi; (Houthis) Abu Bakr Abu Ahmed as-Salami; (Houthis) Hasan Almalsi †; (Houthis) Abdullah al-Fadeea †

Units involved
Saudi Arabian Armed Forces; Royal Saudi Land Forces; Royal Saudi Air Force; Royal Saudi Navy; Royal Saudi Air Defense; National Guard	Yemeni Army (SPC); Republican Guard (2015–2017)

Casualties and losses
- Thousands of Yemeni civilians killed and wounded, 500+ Saudi civilians killed

The Houthi–Saudi conflict is an ongoing armed conflict involving the Armed Forces of Saudi Arabia and Houthi forces in Yemen and along the Saudi–Yemeni border, including parts of Asir, Jazan, and Najran in Saudi Arabia and Saada, Al-Jawf, and Hajjah in Yemen. The conflict began following the Saudi-led intervention in Yemen in 2015.

== Background ==
During their 2004 conflict with the government of Yemeni President Ali Abdullah Saleh, the Houthis accused Saudi Arabia of pressuring Saleh to take action against their community and of providing him with financial support. This accusation was denied by Saleh, and was not acknowledged by Saudi Arabia. Yahya al-Houthi, early in July 2008 indicated Saudi Arabia pressured Saleh to fight Zaydis and Shia Yemeni tribes.

Houthi forces and Yemeni Army units aligned with the Houthis deployed teams equipped with anti-tank guided missiles (ATGMs) to target military vehicles and positions. BM-21s and BM-27s would then target military bases and lay landmines along routes connecting with the Saudi Arabia–Yemen border. Meanwhile, pro-Houthi special forces would assault the border outposts, while motorcycle mounted teams armed with RPG-7s and US-made M47 Dragons infiltrated the Saudi rear. Columns of Saudi Arabian Army (RSLF) forces drive into unknown minefields and ambush places not directly hit by the fighting. Some raiding parties deployed into Saudi Arabia were armed with portable air defense systems (MANPADS), as well as M167 Vulcan towed anti-aircraft cannons. In the first year of the war, they damaged numerous attack helicopters of the RSLF and the Royal Saudi Navy (RSNF), forcing their crews to keep their distance.

On 26 March 2015, a Saudi-led coalition that included the United Arab Emirates began an air campaign in Yemen after Houthi forces captured Sanaa and advanced towards Aden. The coalition also imposed a naval and air blockade on Yemen beginning in March 2015, severely restricting the flow of food, fuel, and medicine, according to Human Rights Watch. Human Rights Watch reported that these restrictions, including port closures and delays to commercial shipments, exacerbated shortages of essential goods and put civilians at serious risk. It also documented cases in which Houthi-Saleh forces obstructed humanitarian assistance.

== Conflict ==
=== 2015 ===
As a result of the Saudi-led intervention in Yemen, the Houthis shelled the Saudi city of Najran on 5 May 2015. Saudi authorities temporarily closed local schools, and the Najran Regional Airport.

On 26 March 2015, Saudi-led coalition airstrikes hit 14 houses in the Bani Hawat neighborhood near Sanaa International Airport. Amnesty International reported that at least 25 people were killed, including six children, based on interviews with hospital staff and eyewitnesses. At the time, it was unclear whether any of those killed were combatants. In a June 2015 report, Human Rights Watch documented 12 coalition airstrikes in Saada between 6 April and 11 May that damaged or destroyed homes, five markets, a school, and a petrol station. The attacks killed 59 people, including at least 35 children, according to the report. Human Rights Watch said it could not independently confirm the civilian status of everyone killed, but found no evidence that the sites its researchers examined were being used for military purposes.

=== 2016 ===
Saudi Arabia stated on 25 July 2016 that clashes resulted in the deaths of five Saudi border guards.

Regular clashes resumed on 11 August, after a one-year ceasefire between the Saudis and Houthis at the Saudi–Yemeni border expired. The Houthis gained entrance into Najran city. On 16 August, Houthi shelling killed seven civilians in an industrial zone in Najran. On the 26th, a power station near the border was hit by a Houthi rocket. A 3-year-old boy was killed by subsequent debris, and his 9-year-old brother was injured. On the 28th, Saudi officials stated that a rocket fired from Yemen hit a family's home in Saudi Arabia, killing two children and wounding five others.

On 15 August 2016, a Saudi-led coalition airstrike hit Abs Hospital in Yemen’s Hajjah governorate, a facility supported by Doctors Without Borders (MSF). The attack killed 19 people, including an MSF staff member, and injured 24 others. MSF said it had repeatedly shared the hospital’s GPS coordinates with the parties to the conflict, including the Saudi-led coalition. Following the attack, MSF withdrew its staff from six hospitals in northern Yemen, citing security concerns. The organization said the withdrawal left an already vulnerable population with reduced access to healthcare.

On 12 September, Saudi Arabia stated that a Houthi mortar killed three Saudi soldiers and wounded two in Najran Province, and also that there had been over five hundred Houthi casualties since the start of the conflict in the province. On 24 September, Houthi Major-General Hassan Almalsi was killed while his squad was attempting to infiltrate into Najran Province.

On 16 September 2016, The Guardian reported that the Yemen Data Project had recorded more than 8,600 air attacks carried out by the Saudi-led coalition between March 2015 and the end of August 2016. Of these, 3,158 were recorded as hitting non-military sites and 3,577 as hitting military sites, while the status of 1,882 attacks remained undetermined. The dataset included attacks on residential areas, markets, schools, hospitals, and mosques. Saudi Arabia disputed the figures, describing them as exaggerated and questioning the methodology used to compile the data.

On 12 October, Salafist fighters, including Salafist leader Bassam al-Mehbar, took control of al-Buqa' border crossing in Yemen's Saada Governorate, with the help of Saudi air support. On the 13th, a Saudi spy drone was shot down by Houthis over Al-Qawiya military base in Jizan. On the same day, a Saudi military vehicle came under fire from Houthis, and a Saudi soldier was killed by Houthi snipers in the Al-Rabiah area of Jizan.

On 1 November, the Houthis claimed to have shot down a drone flying over the Ailab area in Asir Province with an anti-aircraft missile. This was the fourth time in two months that the Houthis had shot down a Saudi aircraft.

On 15 November, Saudi Arabia claimed the RSADF intercepted a missile targeting Najran. On the 19th, Saudi Arabia claimed a Saudi soldier was killed by a missile fired by the Houthis across the border into Asir Province. On the 22nd, according to a Civil Defense Directorate spokesman, one Yemeni citizen was killed and seven other expatriates were injured when projectiles fired from Yemen hit a shopping center in Najran.

On 8 December, a Saudi border guard was killed by a landmine near Jazan Province's Yemeni border. On 21 December, 25 Houthis were killed by a coalition airstrike in Najran Province. On the 22nd, Saudi forces carried out a night-time military operation in Jazan and Najran Provinces, killing thirty Houthis.

In January 2016, a UN panel of experts identified 119 Saudi-led coalition air sorties associated with potential violations of international humanitarian law. Its report documented attacks affecting civilian objects, including residential areas, medical facilities, schools, markets, food warehouses, and transport routes. The report also documented attacks on food-storage facilities and domestic transport routes, which were important for the movement of essential supplies within Yemen.

=== 2017 ===
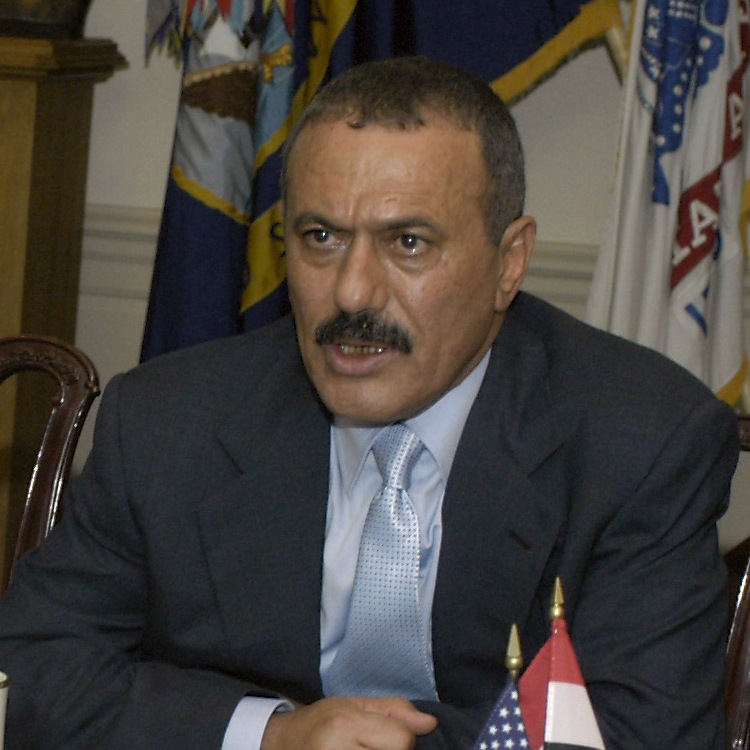
Ali Abdullah Saleh, president of the Republic of Yemen from 1990 to 2012

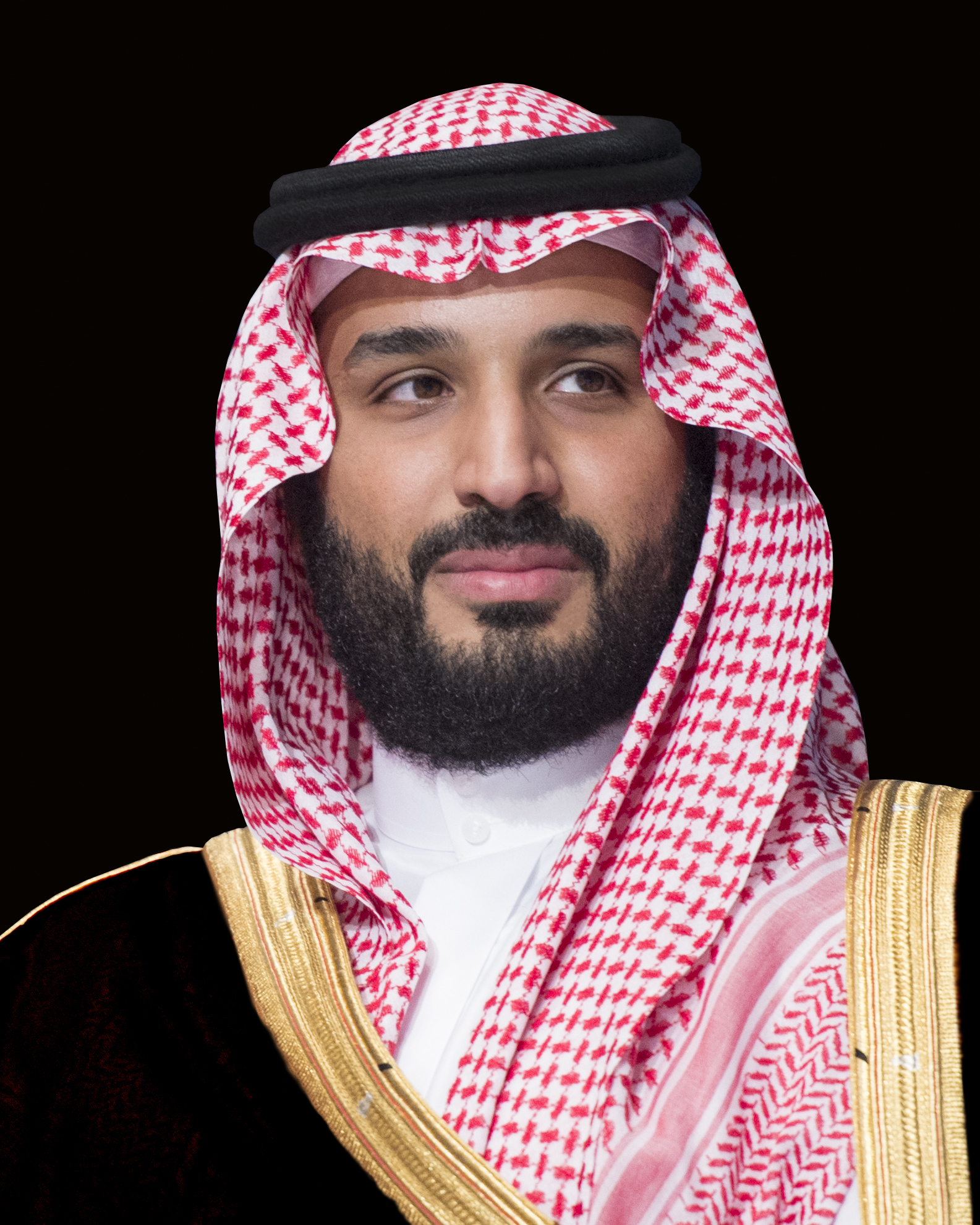
Mohammed bin Salman, de facto ruler of Saudi Arabia since 2015

Saudi Arabia stated that at a border guards' post in Najran Province on 14 January 2017, a Saudi corporal was killed as a result of shelling and other intensive fire.

On 13 February, Saudi state media claimed at least seven Saudi soldiers had been killed in the past week while fighting the Houthis. On 24 February, a Jordanian F-16 warplane crashed in Najran Province, reportedly due to a technical error. The pilot survived.

On 23 March, Houthi media claimed several Saudi soldiers were killed by Houthi missiles. According to Yemeni state media, the struck military sites were in Najran, Jazan, and Asir Provinces. However, Saudi Arabia announced the death of just one soldier on a border post in south Dhahran.

On 16 April, Saudi Arabia claimed one Saudi border guard was killed and three others injured in a mine explosion in Jazan Province. On 27 April, Saudi Interior Ministry stated that two soldiers were killed in Al-Rdhaa Sector, Jazan Province, as a result of land mine explosion and projectiles from Yemen.

On 11 May, Houthis captured a Saudi military base in Raboah, Asir Province, killing and wounding several Saudi soldiers. On 28 May, three Saudi personnel were ambushed by Houthis fighters, including a high-ranking officer at Asir.

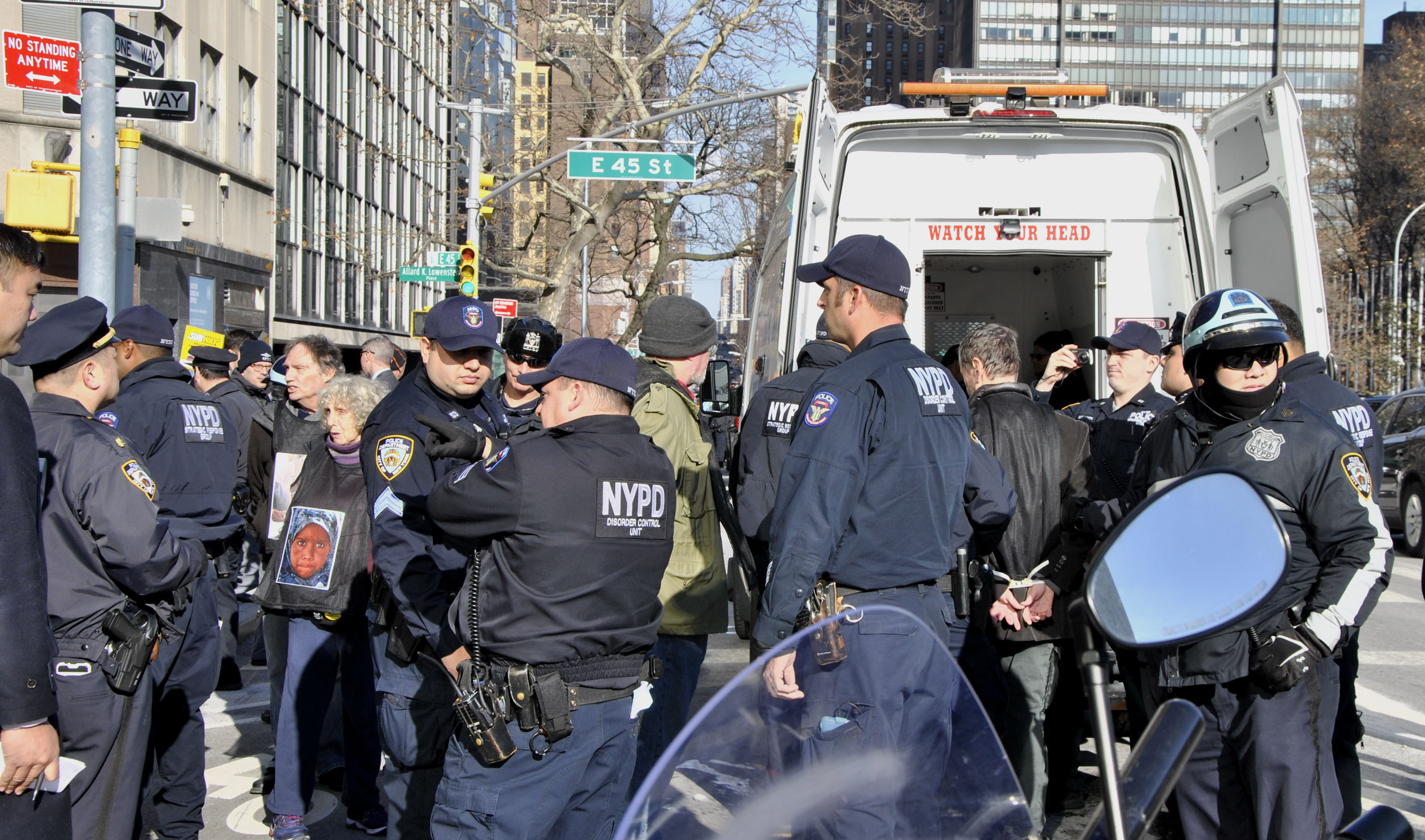
Protesters against the Saudi-led war on Yemen being handcuffed by the NYPD outside the US mission to the UN on 11 December 2017

On 5 November, the Houthi missile was launched into the Saudi capital of Riyadh, which garnered worldwide media attention. According to a Houthi spokesperson, the missile hit its target, King Khalid International Airport, while Saudi Arabia claimed that it intercepted the missile before it got there.

=== 2018 ===
On 11 and 12 January 2018, the Houthis fired missiles at Najran; Saudi Arabia claimed to have intercepted them.

On 11 and 14 February, Houthi fighters fought the Saudi Armed Forces near Najran city. The Houthis were repelled, with Saudi Arabia claiming to have killed more than twenty of them.

On 26 March, Houthis fired seven missiles towards the Saudi capital of Riyadh, all of which were intercepted by Saudi systems. One person was killed, and two were wounded.

=== 2019 ===
On 14 May 2019, a Houthi attack drone struck the Saudi East–West Crude Oil Pipeline. This temporarily shut down the pipeline, and it was reopened later.

On 23 June, the Houthis carried out a drone attack on Abha International Airport, killing one person and wounding 21.

On 17 August, the Houthis attacked an oil and gas field in Shaybah, Saudi Arabia.

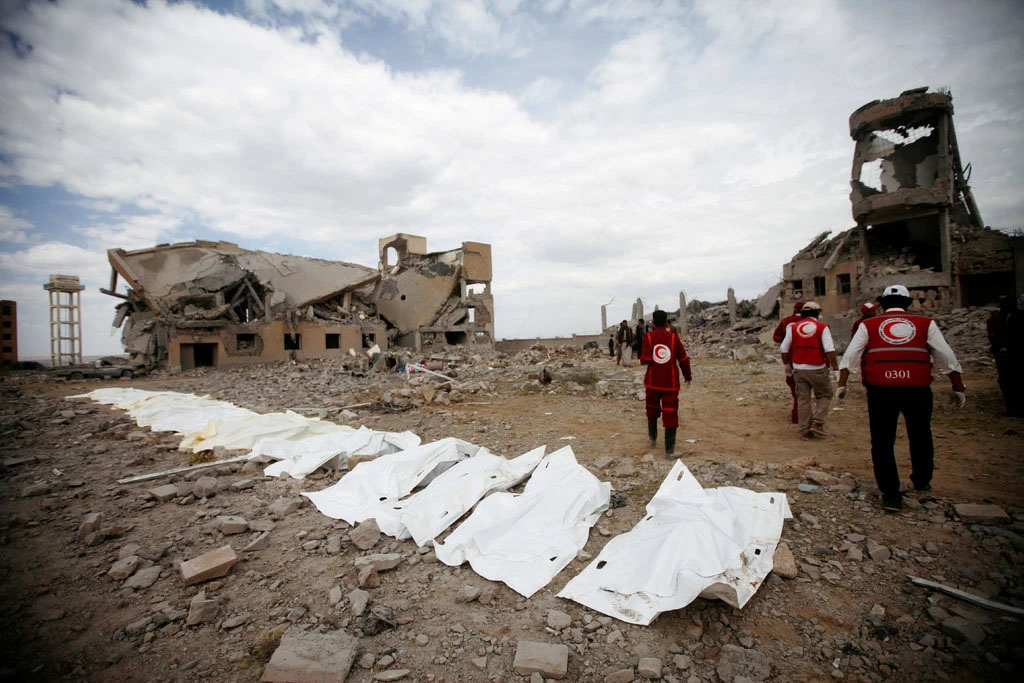
Victims of Saudi-led airstrikes on a university used as a detention center by the Houthis in Dhamar, 2 September 2019

On 14 September, the Houthis claimed responsibility for the Abqaiq and Khurais drone attacks, which temporarily halted 5.7 million barrels per day of Saudi Aramco's crude oil production. On 28 September, a Houthi official stated that three Saudi-led brigades, alongside KSA forces, were besieged and defeated in a 72-hour battle south of Najran. The Houthis claimed the brigades were preparing for a major attack against the Houthis in retaliation to the attack on Abqaiq and Khurais oil facilities, but were entrapped by the Houthis. The Saudis then allegedly conducted airstrikes targeting the Saudi captives but the spokesman assured the families of the captives that they were able to hide and protect them from the Saudi airstrikes. Catherine Shakdam from the Next Century Foundation said that there is no reason to doubt the Houthi statement, yet the Houthis' claims could not be corroborated. Saudi Arabia neither confirmed nor denied the attack.

=== 2020 ===
On 23 June 2020, the Houthis launched a drone and missile attack targeting King Khalid Airport and the Saudi Defense Ministry headquarters in Riyadh.

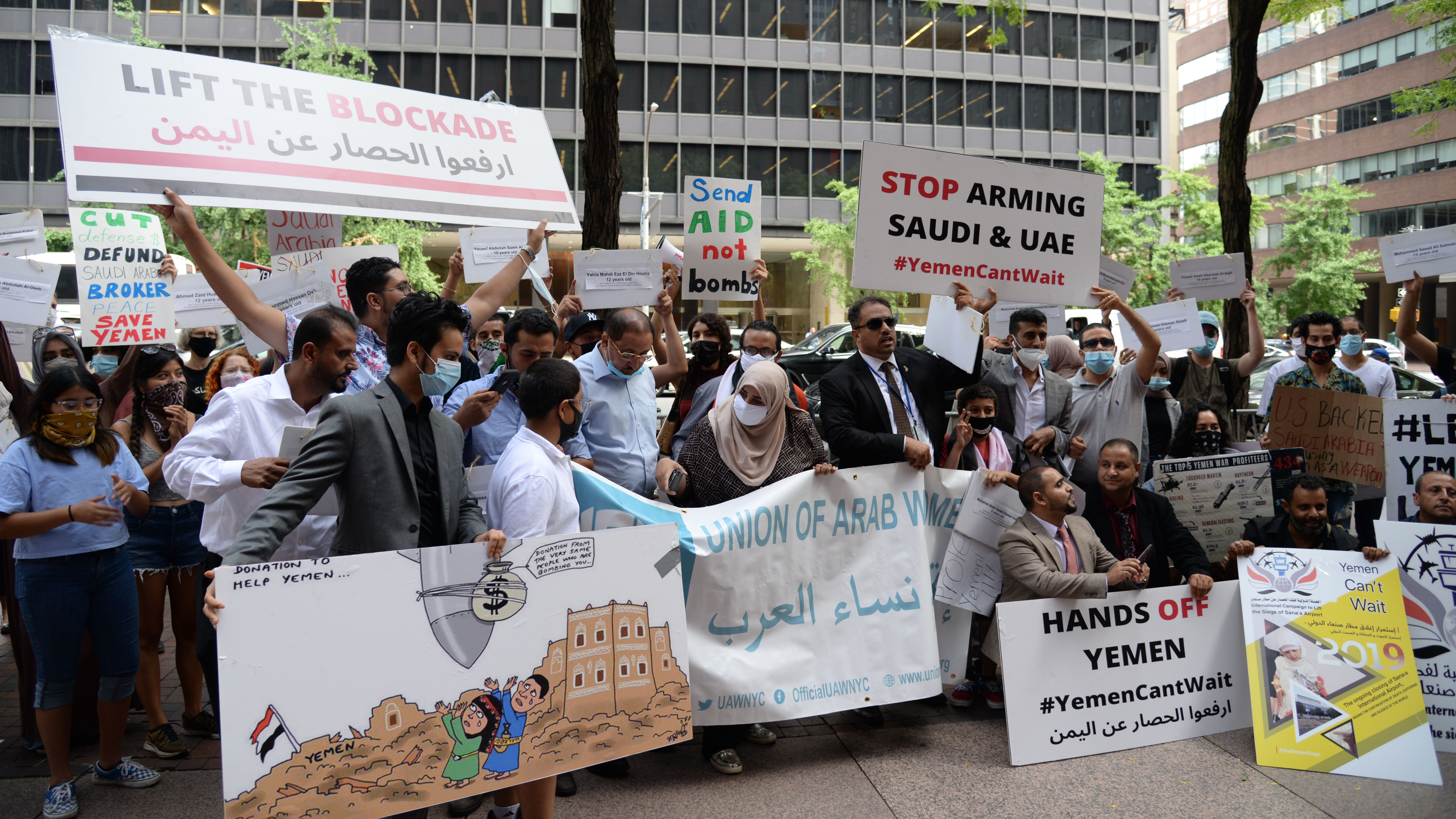
Protest against the war in Yemen on 14 August 2020

On 10 September, the Houthis claimed that they attacked an "important target" in Riyadh using a missile and drones.

On 23 November, a Houthi missile attacked an oil tank at Oil Co. facility in Jeddah, causing a fire. On 25 November, Saudi-led coalition claimed to have destroyed a suicide boat that damaged a nearby ship.

On 9 December, the coalition intercepted a Houthi attack drone launched towards Saudi Arabia.

=== 2021 ===
On 15 January 2021, the coalition intercepted three Houthi attack drones launched from Al Hudaydah. On the 23rd, the coalition intercepted a missile, allegedly launched by the Houthis, over Riyadh.

On 15 February, the Houthis stated that their drones had struck Abha Airport and King Abdulaziz Airport, and that this briefly halted operations at the airports. The coalition said it intercepted Houthi drones launched towards Saudi Arabia, but did not confirm the attacks. On 27 February, Saudi Arabia intercept a missile and drones over Riyadh, likely launched by Houthis.

On 5 March, the coalition intercepted six Houthi drones targeting the city of Khamis Mushait in southern Saudi Arabia. On 7 March, a drone strike had been intercepted that targeted an oil storage yard at Ras Tanura. On the 19th, another drone strike hit Riyadh's oil refinery, which caused a fire that was soon put out. The Houthis stated that they launched six drones at a Saudi Aramco facility. On the 21st, the RSADF intercepted Houthi attack drones over Khamis Mushait. The RSAF launched retaliatory air strikes against Houthis in the city of Sanaa, hitting Sanaa International Airport. Houthi military camps and military manufacturing sites outside Sanaa were also hit. On the 23rd, the RSAF launched air strikes on Houthi military targets in Sanaa city and the port of Salif on the Red Sea coast. On the 26th, Houthi forces launched rocket and drone attacks across Saudi Arabia, causing fires at an Aramco distribution facility in Jizan. No casualties were reported. The RSADF intercepted eight Houthi attack drones at launched Khamis Mushait, Najran city, and Jizan. Later that day, Saudi Arabia intercepted a missile over Najran. On the 28th, the coalition intercepted three Houthi attack drones over Khamis Mushait, and two explosive-laden boats launched from the Red Sea port of Hodeidah.

On 2 April, the coalition intercepted two Houthi attack drones fired toward Khamis Mushait. On 3 April, the coalition destroyed a Houthi attack boat in Salif. On the 12th, the coalition stated that it intercepted six Houthi drones and one Houthi missile over Jizan. On the 15th, the RSADF intercepted five Houthi missiles and four Houthi drones over Jizan; this scattered debris on Jazan University's campus, which caused a fire. No casualties were reported. On the 25th, the coalition intercepted a Houthi attack drone launched towards southern Saudi Arabia.

On 2 May, the RSADF intercepted a Houthi attack drone launched towards Saudi Arabia. On 3 May, the RSADF intercepted multiple Houthi attack drones and one Houthi missile launched towards Najran city. On the 13th, Saudi air defenses intercepted and destroyed eight attack drones and three missiles targeting Saudi Arabia. On the 26th, Saudi Arabia stated that several Houthi missiles landed in Jazan Province. No casualties were reported. On the 28th, the coalition stated that they intercepted a Houthi attack drone targeting southern Saudi Arabia.

On 10 June, the RSADF intercepted a Houthi attack drone launched towards Khamis Mushait. On 13 June, Saudi Press Agency reported a Houthi drone attack on a school in Asir Province. No injuries were reported. The attack sparked international condemnations from the U.S., Egypt, Arab gulf countries, the Arab parliament, and the OIC. On the 14th, the RSADF intercepted another Houthi attack drone targeting Khamis Mushait. On the 19th, the coalition said it intercepted seven Houthi attack drones launched towards southern Saudi Arabia. Later that day, it reported its interception of another ten drones. On the 20th, it intercepted another drone launched towards southern Saudi Arabia.

On 31 August, the Houthis launched a drone attack on Abha International Airport. Saudi Arabia claimed the attack wounded eight civilians, and damaged one civilian aircraft.

On 1 September, the coalition said it had intercepted three attack drones over Yemen. On 4 September, the coalition said it intercepted and destroyed three Houthi attack drones launched towards Saudi Arabia. On the 22nd, the coalition destroyed two explosive-laden boats in the coasts of Hodeidah before being launched to the sea. On the 23rd, the coalition said it intercepted three Houthi attack drones heading towards Saudi Arabia, and a Houthi missile that was specifically targeting Jazan Province.

On 6 October, the coalition said it destroyed three boats in Hodeidah that had been readied for attacks. On 7 October, the coalition intercepted an attack drone targeting Abha International Airport. The coalition said "the drone's debris scattered, four workers at the airport were slightly injured, and the glass of some facades was shattered". Later on, the coalition said it destroyed the drone's launching site in Saada Governorate. Saudi state TV reported that navigation traffic in the airport is normal after it was halted temporarily. On the 9th, Houthi forces launched two attack drones on King Abdullah Airport in Jizan. Ten were wounded, and airport and civilian property was damaged. On the 12th, the coalition intercepted and destroyed a Houthi attack drone launched towards Khamis Mushait. On the 13th, the coalition destroyed two explosive-laden boats used in an attempted attack by Houthis in the south of the Red Sea. On the 23rd, the coalition said it had destroyed four explosive-laden Houthi boats in Hodeidah. The coalition stated warplanes targeted the coastal Al-Jabanah military base east of Hodeidah, where vessels had been prepared to attack international shipping in the Red Sea. On the 28th, the Saudi-led coalition said in a statement that Saudi Arabia's air defenses have intercepted and destroyed five ballistic missiles launched by Houthis toward Jizan city.

On 2 November, the RSADF intercepted two Houthi attack drones targeting Jizan. On 21 November, the Houthis fired missiles at Aramco buildings, including an airport. Saudi Arabia responded by carrying out an air strike.

On 7 December, the coalition bombed targets in Sanaa after the Houthis launched missiles and attacked drones into Saudi Arabia. The coalition stated they also struck Houthi targets in Marib and Jouf around then. On the same day, the coalition said a projectile fell near a public road and a local market in Jazan. On 16 December, the coalition said in a statement that a hostile projectile fell in the industrial area of Ahad Al-Masarihah in Jazan Province. Later that day, the coalition said that it intercepted and destroyed two ballistic missiles fired toward Abha city, Asir province. On the 20th, the coalition launched airstrikes on Sanaa International Airport. A Saudi official stated that the strikes hit six targets, including areas used for launching and storing drones, training drone operators, and housing militants and their trainers. According to Saudi state media, the coalition reportedly urged UN aid workers to evacuate the area before the strikes were carried out. On the 24th, Saudi Arabia that a Houthi projectile hit Samtah in Jazan Province, killing three civilians and wounding seven.

=== 2022 ===
Reportedly, on 21 January 2022, at least 70 people were killed and 138 were wounded in northern Yemen, when the coalition launched airstrikes on Houthis in response to a Houthi attack on Abu Dhabi earlier that month. One area Saudi Arabia struck was a prison. The coalition also damaged the Internet infrastructure of the entire country. Saudi Arabia denied the air raid on the prison, which killed dozens; on the 27th, The Saudi-led coalition said it will investigate the attack.

On 10 February, after Saudi air defences intercepted and destroyed a drone near Yemeni borders, at least 12 civilians were hurt by shrapnel.

On 10 March, the Saudi Press Agency reported that a drone attack on an oil refinery in Riyadh, started a small fire that did not cause injuries. They did not specify where the drone strike was launched from, and Houthis later claimed responsibility for it. The attack caused a short dip in output at a refinery. On 20 March, the coalition reported that Houthis fired missiles and drones at Saudi energy and water desalination facilities, causing a temporary drop in output at a refinery. Later on that day, according to the Saudi-led coalition, another Aramco distribution plant was attacked in Jeddah, leading to a fire in one of the tanks. The fire was controlled and did not result in any casualties. On the 26th, the Houthis announced a three-day ceasefire, and offered Saudi Arabia a permanent ceasefire. The coalition responded by unleashing a barrage of airstrikes on Sanaa and Hodeidah, killing at least seven.

On 28 March, the coalition said it destroyed numerous Houthi attack drones launched towards areas all over Saudi Arabia. The coalition also reported a fire at an electricity distribution plant in Samtah following a Houthi rocket attack. This was followed by another attack that targeted the National Water Company tanks in Dhahran Al Janub governorate, Asir Province. Later that day, the coalition said, Aramco's petroleum products distribution station in Jeddah were hit, close to the Jeddah Corniche Circuit where the Formula One Saudi Arabian Grand Prix was scheduled to take place the following weekend; this allegedly caused a fire in two storage tanks. The attacks reportedly increased the prices of Brent Crude oil to 120 dollars USD per barrel, and U.S. West Texas Intermediate oil to 113 dollars per barrel. On the 31st, Saudi Arabia added 25 people and organisations from various countries to its terrorist lists for allegedly funding the Houthis.

On 13 April, the U.S. Navy announced the formation of a new multinational task force to combat arms smuggling in the waters surrounding Yemen, in response to Houthi attacks on Saudi Arabia and the UAE. On 28 April, the Saudi-led coalition operating in Yemen announced that it will release 163 Houthi militant prisoners.

On 6 May, the coalition in Yemen said it transported more than a hundred of the inmates to Yemen, in conjunction with the Red Cross.

On 2 June 2022, the parties agreed to extend the UN-mediated truce for two months on its existing terms, shortly before it was due to expire that evening. On 27 June, following the Iraqi Prime Minister's call for a renewal of negotiations between the regional adversaries, an Iranian official claimed at a news conference that Saudi Arabia wants to begin diplomatic discussions with Iran.

=== 2023 ===
Four Bahraini soldiers died from wounds sustained in a Houthi drone attack on 25 September 2023 while serving along Saudi Arabia's border with Yemen; other soldiers were wounded.

Map of the Yemeni civil war on 2 December 2025, at the start of the 2025–2026 Southern Yemen campaign

=== 2026 ===
On 13 July, Houthis launched a ballistic missile attack on southern Saudi Arabia which was intercepted by Saudi air defenses. The attack was in response to earlier Saudi-led coalition airstrikes on Sana'a international airport, which were the first since the 2022 ceasefire. According to Reuters, Iran used the airport to send IRGC personnel, military advisers, and missile and drone equipment. Satellite Imagery found at least 5 ammunitions were used three of which hit the airport’s only operational runway. As the airport serves as a key entry point for humanitarian personnel and aid deliveries to areas where most of Yemen’s population lives, the damage raised concerns about Houthi movement's use of Sanaa International Airport endangering civilian infrastructure and increasing the risk of military retaliation on vital public facilities.

On July 25th, another wave of Houthi projectiles struck a Saudi Aramco oil refinery in Jizan.

On 8th September, Houthis targeted multiple sites in Saudi Arabia in which more than 70 people were wounded.

Saudi Arabia launched a series of 54 airstrikes in Yemen over a 12-hour period leading up to Wednesday, September 10, 2026.

On 5 October, Yemeni Presidential Leadership Council chairman Rashad al-Alimi announced the launch of Operation Dawn of Yemen, an offensive aimed at retaking Sanaa and other Houthi-controlled areas. Around 100 Saudi aircraft were supporting the operation, striking hundreds of Houthi targets. The PLC said that it captured much of Dhubab district, including the Dhubab airport, and severed the road from Dhubab to Mokha; the Houthis denied that any gains were made. The Yemeni military said that operations in Saada, al-Jawf, and Taiz "neutralized" 1,747 Houthis, and launched an attack on Raghwan district. The Houthis claimed the capture of al-Mawasit district. Yemeni media and Il Sole 24 Ore later reported that the PLC recaptured Mokha, which the Houthis later denied. The PLC claimed to have shot down 5 drones belonging to the Houthis in Taiz.

During the government offensive to retake areas near the Bab-el-Mandeb strait, video posted by Saudi-backed Yemeni government forces showed armoured vehicles driving over Houthi fighters near Dhubab, Taiz Governorate. The footage, which Reuters verified, showed some of the men were armed, while others were unarmed, and some appeared to have their hands raised. The Houthis described the footage as evidence of war crimes. A government brigade commander said his unit had been misled into thinking the Houthi fighters were surrendering, and that some then opened fire on them. The Saudi-led coalition did not immediately respond to a request for comment.

On October 8, a Saudi Arabian Airlines Airbus A320 was destroyed at King Khalid International Airport when it was hit by a Houthi ballistic missile; as a result, ten airlines have halted their flights to the Saudi capital. Three Saudi citizens have been killed, and many others wounded in attacks on Riyadh airport.

On 10 October, a missile attack on Saudi Arabia left 13 people were killed and over 300 injured in a Houthi attack on King Khalid International Airport in Riyadh. Among the dead were four Saudi citizens and two Bangladeshis, along with individuals from various countries. Some wounded are in critical condition. The airport temporarily stopped operations for damage assessment. It has been reported that one of those killed in the incident was an American. Regarding U.S. intelligence and military assistance, approximately 200 American military advisors are stationed in Saudi Arabia to support this operation.

On 11 October, terminal 4 of King Khalid International Airport was struck again, starting a fire in one of its passenger halls. A Pakistani resident died and 11 people were injured. In the Eastern Province, King Fahd International Airport in Dammam was also attacked, with no information of casualties reported.

On 12 October, the Houthis launched another ballistic missile toward Riyadh, but it was intercepted by Saudi Arabia.

On October 13, an office building belonging to Saudi Aramco in the eastern city of Dhahran was targeted by the Houthis. The attack caused no damage or casualties. In response, Saudi Arabia struck oil facilities in the Al-Sabah district of Sana'a. The Yemen Oil Company stated that its storage tanks were empty and that the Saudi attack would not impact oil reserves or the fuel supply required by the local population.

On 15 October 2026, the Saudi-led coalition reported that it had destroyed 127 Houthi weapons storage facilities and launch platforms in Yemen. Coalition spokesperson Major General Turki al-Maliki stated that the Houthis had obtained advanced military technology with support from unspecified regional actors, including ballistic missiles, attack drones and explosive-laden fast boats. Separately, Houthi forces launched a missile attack on the Al-Maashiq Presidential Palace complex in Aden, where Yemen's internationally recognized government is based. Yemeni officials reported that the attack killed and wounded members of the security forces guarding the complex. The Houthis said they had targeted a Saudi military operations headquarters at the site and claimed that weapons depots were also among the targets. The coalition also reported that the Houthis attempted to carry out attacks against Saudi airports and other civilian infrastructure, including King Khalid International Airport in Riyadh.

On 17 October, Aden International Airport was struck by missiles. The Aden Security Department attributed the airport strike to the Houthis, which the group denied. Two cruise missiles and three drones targeting Yanbu, Saudi Arabia were intercepted; the attackers were not specified.

On 20 October, the United Kingdom announced further military assistance to Saudi Arabia following Houthi attacks. Defence Secretary Wes Streeting called the attacks "absolutely despicable" and singled out the attack on Riyadh's airport. The UK deployed Royal Air Force Eurofighter Typhoon jets to help protect Saudi cities and critical infrastructure from Houthi missiles and drones. Its support also included an A400M transport aircraft, military advisers and additional air-to-air refuelling for Saudi operations. Saudi Arabia also requested Munitions India limited for 10,000 more rounds of 155 mm artillery ammunition. France sent troops and air defence equipment to protect Yanbu, a major Saudi oil export terminal on the Red Sea. French officials said the deployment was defensive.

== Reactions ==
After the Houthi assaults on airports in Riyadh, Abha, and Khamis Mushait, along with other locations, in October 2026, the United Arab Emirates Ministry of Foreign Affairs denounced the continued increase in Houthi attacks targeting civilians, economic infrastructure, and Saudi ships in the southern Red Sea and the Bab el-Mandeb Strait.

In October 2026, the United Arab Emirates (UAE) has decided to rejoin the Yemen conflict by starting to pay some government forces battling the Houthi group, aligned with Iran. In exchange, Saudi Arabia will provide air support for these forces. This agreement shows a growing cooperation between the UAE and Saudi Arabia as they both face Houthi advances, which threaten their stability. Despite this, neither has responded to calls for a vote on Southern Yemen’s secession or the conditions under which Southern forces will fight.

The Egyptian president has convened parliament to pave the way for providing military support to defend Saudi Arabia—without participating in offensive operations. Meanwhile, in the United Kingdom, discussions about providing further military aid to Saudi Arabia continue, amid legal concerns over arms exports.

On 15 October 2026, the United Nations Security Council issued a statement condemning Houthi attacks against aviation and energy infrastructure in Saudi Arabia, and Houthi threats against commercial shipping in the Red Sea and the Bab al-Mandab Strait. It called for measures to prevent the Houthis from obtaining weapons and called for a negotiated settlement to the conflict.
