= Tandhah =

Tandhah تَنْدَحَة
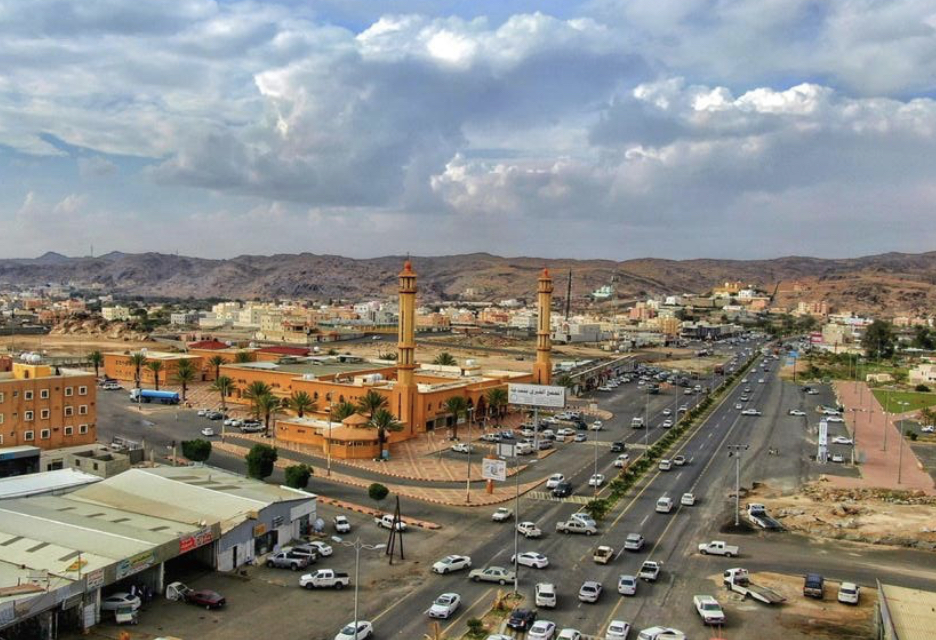
- A picture of a Tandhah

- Location within Saudi Arabia
- Coordinates: 18°21′28″N 42°50′07″E
- Country: Saudi Arabia

Population
  - Total: 48,000

Tandhah (Arabic: تَنْدَحَة) is a settlement belonging to the Khamis Mushait Governorate in the Asir region of the Kingdom of Saudi Arabia. It is located about 20 kilometers east of the city of Khamis Mushait, connected to Khamis Mushait - Riyadh.

== Border ==
It is bordered to the north by the Wadi Bin Hashbal Center, to the south by the Ahad Rafidah Governorate, to the east by the Ya'ra Center, and to the west by the city of Khamis Mushait.

== Climate ==
It is an area that is almost cold in winter and mild in summer, and is famous for its water dam.

== Tandhah Valley ==
Wadi Tandaha is one of the most famous and largest tributaries of Wadi Bishah. Many villages and settlements lie along its banks, and it is known for its abundant water and the quality of its agricultural produce. Fertile agricultural lands bordering the valley supply the southern region with a wide variety of fruits and vegetables. Wadi Tandaha is distinguished by its natural beauty and lush greenery.

The source of Wadi Tandaha originates in the Hijaz Mountains, with its head at Al-Butah to the south. It then passes through Al Jaradah, after which it is called Wadi Al-Wahaba. Two other valleys join it from the east, flowing into a place called Al-Tandahi, where the Wadi Tandaha Dam was constructed. The dam is 120 meters long, 24.5 meters high, and has a storage capacity of 4,200,000 cubic meters. Wadi Tandaha then continues until it flows into Wadi Bishah, passing through the city of Tandaha. The total length of Wadi Tandaha is approximately 60 kilometers.
