= Tabalah, Saudi Arabia =

Tabalah تبالة
- Location in 'Asir Province, Saudi Arabia
- Coordinates: 19°59′52″N 42°13′47″E
- Country: Saudi Arabia
- Province: 'Asir

Population (2010)
  - Total: 5,670

Tabalah (Arabic: تبالة, romanized: Tabāla) is a village and wadi in the Asir Province of Saudi Arabia. It is situated about 240 kilometers (150 mi) south of Ta'if, 200 kilometers (120 mi) east of the Red Sea coastline and 100 kilometers (62 mi) west of Bisha. In the 2010 census, Tabalah had a population of 5,670, of which 4,990 were citizens of Saudi Arabia and 680 non-citizens.

== History ==
Tabalah on a map depicting the major towns of 8th-century Arabia

During the pre-Islamic period (pre-7th century), Tabalah was home to the shrine of the idol of Dhu'l-Khalasa. In the early Islamic period (7th–13th centuries), it was a large and prosperous town on the pilgrimage route to Mecca from Yemen, in between the way-stations of Bisha and Ajrab. According to al-Baladhuri and al-Tabari, the inhabitants of Tabalah accepted Islam without resistance and the Islamic prophet Muhammad imposed a poll tax on the Christians and Jews of the town and nearby Jurash. Muhammad had led or dispatched expeditions against members of the Khath'am tribe in Tabalah in 629 and 630 CE. The medieval Arabic geographers note that the town contained several springs and wells which watered the town's date palm groves and agricultural fields. According to the 10th-century geographer al-Hamdani, most of its inhabitants hailed from the Quraysh tribe of Mecca. It is most known in the medieval sources as being the short-lived governorship of al-Hajjaj ibn Yusuf, who considered it an insignificant post because it was hidden by a hill.

== Bibliography ==
- Hitti, Philip Khuri (1916). The Origins of the Islamic State, Being a Translation from the Arabic, Accompanied with Annotations, Geographic and Historic Notes of the Kitâb Fitûh Al-buldân of Al-Imâm Abu-l Abbâs Ahmad Ibn-Jâbir Al-Balâdhuri, Volume 1. New York and London: Columbia University & Longman, Green & Co.
- Larsson, Göran (2003). Ibn García's Shuʻūbiyya Letter: Ethnic and Theological Tensions in Medieval Al-Andalus. Leiden: E. J. Brill. ISBN 90-04-12740-2.
- Oseni, Zakariyau I. (1982). "Early Life of al-Hajjaj b. Yusuf". Studies in Islam. 19. New Delhi: Indian Institute of Islamic Studies: 125–136.
- Smith, G. R. (2000). "Tabāla". In Bearman, P. J.; Bianquis, Th.; Bosworth, C. E.; van Donzel, E. & Heinrichs, W. P. (eds.). The Encyclopaedia of Islam, Second Edition. Volume X: T–U. Leiden: E. J. Brill. p. 10. ISBN 978-90-04-11211-7.
