= Qahafah Tribe =

Qahafah قحافة
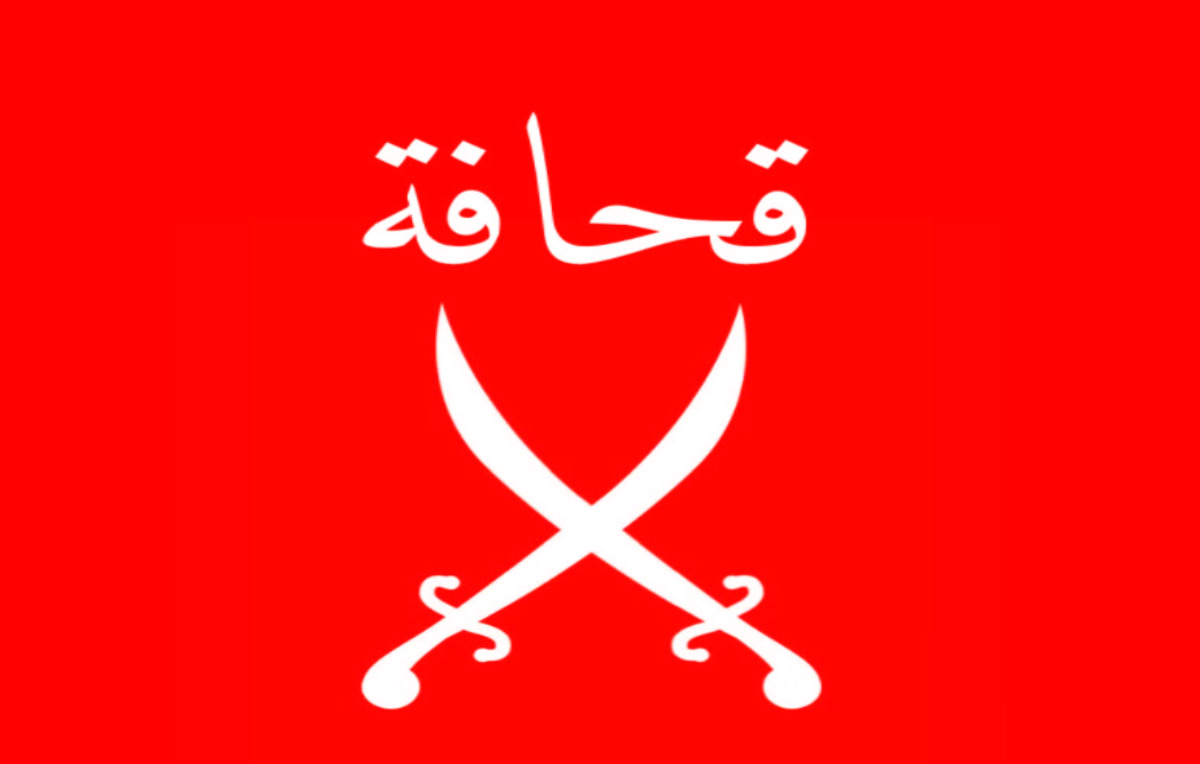
- Nisba: Al-Qahafi
- Location: Saudi Arabia; Egypt; Lebanon; Iraq
- Parent tribe: Shahran
- Language: Arabic
- Religion: Islam

Qahafah (Arabic: قُحَافَة) is an Arab tribe belonging to the Khath'am lineage and considered a branch of the Shahran tribe. The tribe has been known since pre-Islamic times and primarily inhabits Wadi Bishah, also known as Wadi Shahran or Wadi Bin Hashbal, in Saudi Arabia. Some members of the tribe also reside in the village of Qahafah in Egypt. Several notable historical figures and some of the Prophet’s Companions are said to have originated from this tribe.

== Genealogy ==
The lineage of the Qahafah (Arabic: قُحَافَة) tribe traces back to Qahafah bin Amir bin Rabi‘ah bin Amir bin Sa‘d bin Malik bin Nasr bin Wahib bin Shahran bin ‘Afras bin Hilf bin Khath‘am bin Anmar.

== Notable Figures ==
- Asma bint Umays (may Allah be pleased with her)

A distinguished female companion of the Prophet, known for her noble status in early Islamic society. She was married several times: first to Ja'far ibn Abi Talib, with whom she had Abdullah, Muhammad, and Awn; then to Abu Bakr al-Siddiq, with whom she had Muhammad; and finally to Ali ibn Abi Talib, with whom she had Yahya and Awn.

Before her marriages to the Companions, she was the wife of Rabi‘ah ibn Riyah and gave birth to Malik, Abdullah, and Abu Hurayrah, known as the sons of Rabi‘ah, which reflects her high standing and the prestige of her tribe, Khath‘am.

Her maternal sisters were Maymunah bint al-Harith and Zaynab bint Khuzaymah, both wives of the Prophet Muhammad (peace and blessings be upon him).

- Salma bint Umays (may Allah be pleased with her)

A female companion, married to Hamza ibn Abd al-Muttalib, the Prophet’s uncle, and bore him a daughter. After his death, she married Shaddad al-Laythi. Salma was related to Maymunah, the Prophet’s wife, through their mother Hind bint ‘Awn from Himyar, and through Babah bint al-Harith, the mother of al-‘Abbas ibn ‘Abd al-Muttalib.

- Awn ibn Umays (may Allah be pleased with him)

A Companion, and the maternal uncle of the children of Ja‘far, Abu Bakr, Hamzah, and Ali. He was martyred during the Battle of al-Harrah.

- Malik ibn Abdullah

A successor, originally from Palestine, known as "Malik al-Sawa’if" ("King of the Summer Expeditions"). He led campaigns against the Byzantines for forty years under Mu‘awiyah ibn Abi Sufyan and other rulers. Upon his death, forty banners were broken over his grave as a sign of his valor and leadership.

- Zaynab bint Umays

The wife of Hamza ibn Abd al-Muttalib and mother of his daughter Fatimah, who later married ‘Amr ibn Salamah al-Makhzumi, the Prophet’s stepson. She was the sister of Salma bint Umays. Some sources state that Hamza’s wife was Zaynab, while others report it was Salma.

- A‘idhah bint al-Khams

The matriarch of the Banu Khuzaymah ibn Lu’ayy clan of the Quraysh, from whom the tribe takes its name.

- Shammar ibn Abdullah

A prominent figure close to Mu‘awiyah ibn Abi Sufyan. Mu‘awiyah once detained his cousin Karim ibn ‘Afif al-Khath‘ami; Shammar interceded on his behalf, and Mu‘awiyah granted him permission to correspond with him but forbade Karim from entering Kufa, which was under Mu‘awiyah’s control. Karim later moved to Mosul. Shammar was known to have said, “If Mu‘awiyah were to die, I would go to Egypt,” but he passed away a month before Mu‘awiyah.

- Asad ibn al-Khamis

A poet of the Khath‘am tribe during the pre-Islamic era.

== Territory ==
The territory of the Qahafah tribe includes a group of villages and notable areas within the valley, such as:

- Al-Hirsh
- 'Arijah
- Al Bi Thawr

Among these, Al Bi Thawr is considered the most important village in the valley, as it contains government offices and the Monday Market. The area also includes Al-Darb, the newly established Al-Khazzan neighborhood, Al-Shahmah, Al-Shall, Jawharah, Umm Khameer, Jarwah, Al-Tarif Al-Asfal, Al-Tarif Al-A‘la, Al-Masnna, Al-Hadrah, Al-Haifah, Bu Murayrah, and Al-Daiqah.

== See also ==
- Shahran
- Khath'am
- Al-Mushayt
