= Shahran =

Tribe of Saudi Arabia

Shahran شهران
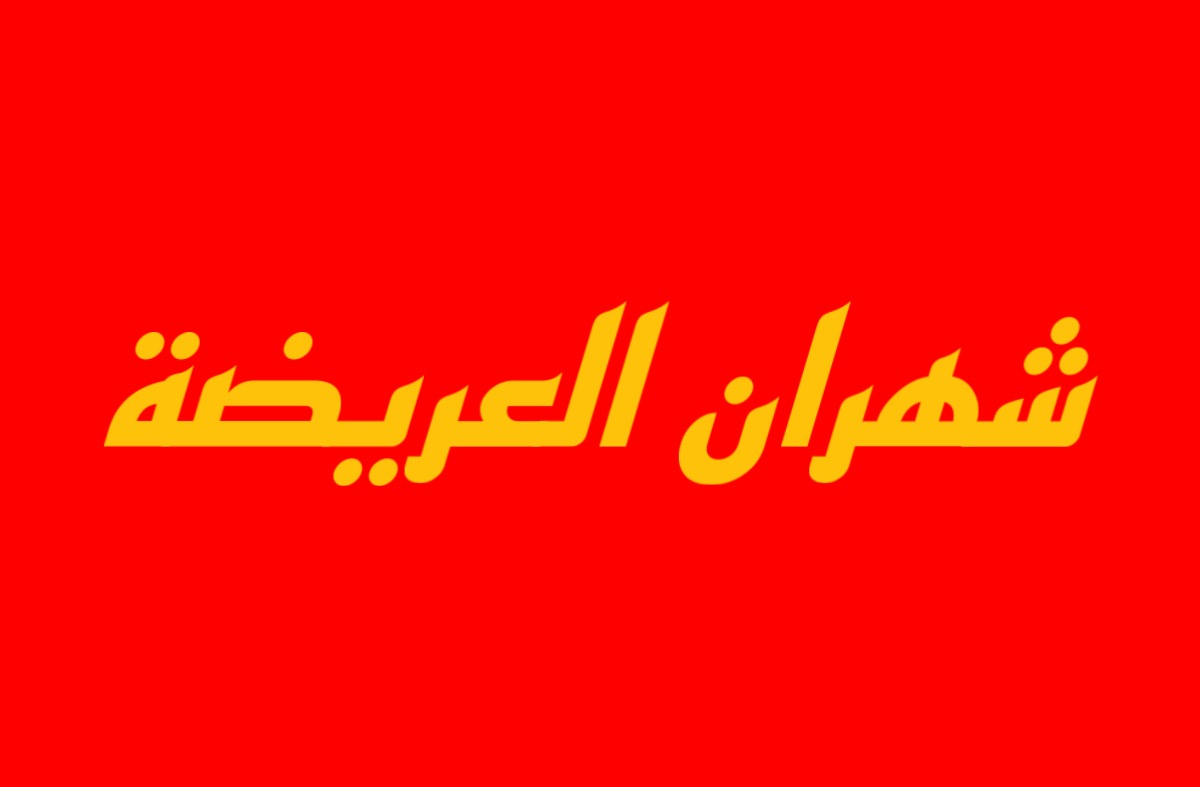
- Ethnicity: Arabs
- Nisba: Al-Shahrani
- Location: The Arab world
- Descended from: Shahran bin Afras bin Tahalif bin Khatham bin Anmar
- Parent tribe: Khath'am
- Branches: wahab allah; alfazae
- Language: Arabic
- Religion: Islam
- Surnames: Al-Areedhah (The Broad)

Shahran (Arabic: شَهْرَان) is one of the largest tribes in the 'Asir and Jizan region of Saudi Arabia. Shahrani lands are bordered by Subay' and Al-Shalaowah (الشلاوة وسبيع) to the north, 'Abida and Rofaidah to the east (عبيدة ورفيدة), Al Njou’ to the South (النجوع), and Banou Sha’ba, Mogaidah, Banou Melk, Bal’smar, Banou Sheher, Balgern and Shamran to the west. (بنو شعبة ومغيدة وبنو مالك وبلحمر وبلسمر وبنو شهر وبلقرن وشمران). The noticed density to the west of Shahrani lands is due to the presence of the large city of Abha (آبها) in that direction. Through history, tribal wars have been waged between the two neighbors, especially between Shahran and the other major tribe of the area, Qahtan (قحطان). Such wars have not been waged after the formation of the Kingdom of Saudi Arabia. Shahran's largest and main city is Khamis Mushayt (The largest city in ‘Asir, and the 8th largest in Saudi Arabia with an estimated population of 1,100,000). Khamis Mushayt is noted for being the fourth largest trading center in Saudi Arabia, and is famous for its world-class military airbase.

Sharan is a large tribe, thus its name (Shahran al-Ar’eda; شَهْرَان العَرِيْضة) which means “wide (or volumes) Shahran” in Arabic. The number of this tribe reaches 5 million people, and is thus one of the largest in Arabia. The head of Shahran is assigned to the House of Mushayt, and has been such for hundreds of years now.

== Origin ==
Shahran bin Afras bin Tahalif bin Khatham bin Anmar bin Arash bin Amr bin Al-Ghouth bin Nabat bin Malik bin Zaid bin Kahlan bin Saba, and these are the words of my son, Khalifa bin Khayyat, Al-Yaqoubi, daughters of Asakir, daughters of Hazm, Abu Al-Mundhir Al-Sahari, and the majority of lineage.

== Clans ==
Shahran branches into the following 27 clans:

- Al-Rshaid (آل رشيد )
- Koad ( كود )
- Nahess (ناهس)
- Al-alGhmer (آل الغمر )
- Beni Manbah (بني منبه )
- Beni Waheb (بني واهب )
- Beni Bejaad (بني بجاد )
- Al-Yanfa’ (آل ينفع)
- Beni Majoor (بني ماجور )
- Beni Slooll (بني سلول)
- Beni Samah ( بني سامه )
- AlZelal (ال الزلال)
- Beni jabruh (بني جابره)
- Al’Hejaj (ال حجاج)
- AlGaraeen (القراعين)
- Beni Qouhafah (بني قحافه )
- Al-Serhan (آل سرحان)

Originally nomadic, immigrated from Najd area, near Riyadh for the sake of living, they are, from bani Hilal who immigrated to North Africa, they are of Semitic descent,

- Beni Rash’hah (بني رشحه)
- Al-Remtheen (الرمثين)
- Al-alSerh (آل السرح)
- Al-Mettair (آل مطير )
- Al-alSafq (آل الصفق)
- Al-Na’man (آل نعمان)
- AlJehrah (الجهرة)
- Ahel AlHaqou (أهل الحقو )
- Ahel AlSha’af (أهل الشعف)
- Beni Malek (بنو مالك)
- Al-ojaere (العجير)

== See also ==
- Khamis Mushayt
- 'Asir
- Bisha
- Arabs
- Qahafah Tribe
- Al-Mushayt
