= Dhorm Mountain =

Mountain in Saudi Arabia

- Asir Saudi Arabia

Highest point
- Elevation: 2,800 m (9,200 ft)
- Coordinates: 18°43′51″N 42°08′26″E

Geography
- Parent range: Sarawat Mountains

Dhorm Mountain is a mountainous elevation of the Sarawat Mountains located in the Asir region of Saudi Arabia. It is distinguished by its picturesque nature and agricultural terraces. Dhorm Mountain also contains a number of historical monuments, including Mount Luqman, which is situated to the east of the villages of Dhorm, specifically at the summit of Dhorm Mountain.

It is said that the mountain was named due to the presence of the Dhorm plant, which is indigenous to the region. The mountain is located in Balsamar, Rijal Al-Hajar, Asir. Its historical value is enhanced by the presence of The Luqman Summit is notable for its frequent narratives about the presence of the grave of Luqman, the presence of historical inscriptions, castles, and fortresses around it, and its diverse vegetation. It is situated at an altitude of more than 2200 meters above sea level.

== Geographical location ==
It is situated in a precise northeast location with respect to the city of Muhayil, situated within the Asir region of Saudi Arabia, and follows the center of Tihama Balsamar. It is regarded as a pivotal element of the Sarawat Mountain range, which encompasses the western highlands of the Arabian Peninsula, extending from Yemen to the Hejaz and ultimately reaching the Gulf of Aqaba in the north. The mountain is bordered to the south by Wadi Thamran and Hada Mountain, to the north by Wadi Al-Ghayl and Barkuk Mountain, and to the east by Wadi Natan and the foothills of Sarat Al-Hajar, specifically Sarwat Balsamar from the Sarawat Mountains. The mountain's western border is defined by the plain, which is represented by the center of Tihama Balsamar and its base in the city of Khamis Mutair.

== Climate and weather ==
The mountain climate is subject to considerable variation due to the influence of topographical factors. The climate in the highlands is characterised by moderate to severe cold, while the lowlands experience warm to hot conditions with high humidity and a high probability of precipitation throughout the year.

== Administration ==
From an administrative standpoint, the mountain falls within the purview of the Tihamah Balsamar Center, a pivotal center within the Muhayil Asir Governorate. Situated to the northwest of Abha City, the administrative headquarters and capital of the Asir region, the center is designated by Royal Decree No. A/92, dated August 27, 1412 AH.

== Population ==
The mountain is inhabited by the Al Sa'ad tribes from Balathma, Balsamar, and the Rijal al-Hajar tribes from Azad. These tribes are divided into two large sections: the Al-Sa'idi and the Al Sa'idi and Al Garaa tribes are divided into four and eight sections, respectively, which inhabit approximately forty and fifty villages, respectively. The Azd tribe is a significant Arab tribe belonging to the Kahlan branch of the Qahtaniyah Sheba tribe.

== Main villages ==
=== Al-Sharaf Village ===
The site is situated at the summit of the mountain and is surrounded to the north by the village of Al-Ataba, to the south by Luqman Peak and Thamran Valley, and to the east by Thamran and Al-Nahab valleys.

=== Al-Ataba Village ===
The residents of this locale are members of the Al-Saeedi clan. Its geographical coordinates are as follows: northeast of the mountain, bordered to the north by Wadi al-Ghayl, to the south by the village of al-Sharaf, to the east by Sarwat Balsamar, and to the west by the village of al-Qarah.

=== Alhadab Village ===
The inhabitants of this community are members of the Gharaa clan. It is situated in the central region of the mountain, situated between other villages and serving as a crossroads.

=== Al-Qarah Village ===
The area is inhabited by the Al-Saeedi clan. The village is situated to the north of the mountain and is bordered to the north by Wadi al-Ghayl, to the south by Wadi Falqa, to the east by the village of Al-Ataba, and to the west by Al-Sheikh.

=== Al-Qafeel Village ===
The population consists of the Al Gharaa clan. The village is situated at the base of the mountain, on the southern side. It is bordered on the north by the village of Al-Maqraa, on the south by Wadi Thamran, on the east by Alfy village and Al-Rahwa village, and on the west by Khamis Mutair.

=== Zareab Village ===
The residents of this settlement are members of the Al Gharaa clan. It is situated on the western slope of the mountain, with the villages of Al-Qarah and Al-Qurayyat to the north, Al-Rahwa to the south, Al-Sharaf to the east, and Al-Maqraa to the west.

=== Alfy Village ===
The village is inhabited by the Gharaa clan and is located in the southwest of the mountain. It is bordered to the north by the village of Al-Rahwa, to the south by Luqman Peak and Wadi Thamran, to the east by Al-Sharaf village, and to the west by Al-Qafeel village.

=== Doha Village ===
The village is inhabited by the Gharaa clan and is located in a northern region, bordered to the north by the village of Al-Qarah, to the south by the village of Al-Zareab, to the east by the village of Al-Sharaf, and to the west by the village of Al-Fadia.

=== Rahwa Village ===
The inhabitants of this community are members of the Gharaa clan. It is situated in the central region of the mountain, situated between other villages. It is a crossroads of roads, with the village of Zareab to the north, the village of Alfy to the south, the village of Al-Sharaf to the east, and the village of Al-Qafeel to the west.

=== Dahyan Village ===
The population consists of the Al-Saeedi clan. It is situated on the eastern slopes of the mountain, with the following boundaries, to the north, Wadi al-Ghayl, to the east, Wadi Natan; to the west, the village of al-Ataba; and to the south, the heights of Ba'dhi.

=== Sadr Village ===
The inhabitants of Gharaa Al-Sharaf.

=== Al-Khalaf Village ===
The inhabitants of Gharaa Al-Sharaf.

=== Nabah Village ===
The inhabitants of Gharaa Al-Menefy.
