= Bajila =

Arab tribe

Bajila بجيلة
- Qahtanite
- Banner of Bajila at the Battle of Siffin (657)
- Ethnicity: Arab
- Nisba: Al-Bajali
- Location: Mecca; Iraq (after 634)
- Religion: Arabian polytheism, later Islam

The Bajīla (Arabic: بجيلة) was an Arab tribe that inhabited the mountains south of Mecca in the pre-Islamic era and later dispersed to different parts of Arabia and then Iraq under the Muslims. The tribe, under one of its chieftains Jarir ibn Abd Allah, played a major role in the Muslim army that conquered Iraq in the mid-7th century.

== Genealogy ==
In Arab genealogical tradition, the origins of the Bajila are not certain, The tribe's eponymous progenitor was said to be a woman. According to a number of the traditional genealogists, they, along with the Khath'am tribe, were subdivisions of the larger Anmar, which was identified either as Qahtanite (southern Arabian) or Adnanite (northern Arabian). The nisba of a member of the Bajila was "al-Bajalī".

== History ==
The Bajila, along with its sister tribe of Khath'am, and the tribes of Banu Tamim, Banu Bakr and Abd al-Qays, launched raids against Sassanian-controlled Lower Mesopotamia during the reign of Shapur II (r. 309–379 CE), but suffered heavy losses when the latter retaliated. During the early years of the Islamic prophet Muhammad, the Bajila inhabited the mountains south of Mecca, but due to blood feuds with neighboring tribes and internecine fighting between its clans, namely the Ahmas, Qasr, Zayd ibn al-Ghawth and Urayna, the tribe became splintered and dispersed. Many of its clans became attached to larger tribes, such as the Banu 'Amir between Ta’if and Jabal Tuwayq or the Jadila of Qays who inhabited the area south of Ta’if. One of the clans who remained in the Sarat was the Qasr.

In Muhammad's last years, a Qasri chieftain, Jarir ibn Abd Allah al-Bajali, led a delegation of 150 of his tribesmen and converted to Islam in the prophet's presence. They were subsequently dispatched to demolish the Dhul Khalasa sanctuary, which the polytheistic Bajila and Khath'am tribes had worshiped until then. Many Bajila clans, namely those inhabiting southern Arabia, reverted to polytheism following Muhammad's death in 632, but returned to Muslim authority after the punitive campaigns of their kinsmen Jarir, who remained loyal to the Muslims. Jarir became an effective Muslim commander under caliphs Abu Bakr (632–634) and Umar (r. 634–644). During the latter's rule, the Bajila under Jarir were a powerful component of the Muslim army that conquered Iraq (Lower Mesopotamia), accounting for 700 to over 1,500 warriors, and were accorded a fourth of the lands of its agriculturally rich Sawad region. Many of the Bajali clans that had become attached to other tribes were directed by Umar to come under Jarir's chieftainship. According to historian Julius Wellhausen, the ascent of Islam rejuvenated the Bajila to a certain degree following a period of severe decline.

== Bibliography ==
- Donner, Fred M. (1981). The Early Islamic Conquests. Princeton University Press.
- Watt, W. Montgomery (1960). "Badjīla". In Gibb, H. A. R.; Kramers, J. H.; Lévi-Provençal, E.; Schacht, J.; Lewis, B. & Pellat, Ch. (eds.). The Encyclopaedia of Islam, Second Edition. Volume I: A–B. Leiden: E. J. Brill. p. 55. OCLC 495469456.
- Wellhausen, Julius (1927). The Arab Kingdom and Its Fall. Translated by Margaret Graham Weir. Calcutta: University of Calcutta. OCLC 752790641.
