= Abdulrahman bin Saad al-Shahrani =

Major general of the Royal Saudi Land Forces

- عبدالرحمن بن سعد الشهراني
- Died: August 2015; Southern Saudi Arabia
- Military career
- Allegiance: Saudi Arabia
- Branch: Royal Saudi Land Forces
- Rank: Major general
- Commands: 18th "King Abdullah" Light Motorized Infantry Brigade
- Conflicts: Saudi Arabian-led intervention in Yemen †

Abdulrahman bin Saad al-Shahrani (Arabic: عبدالرحمن بن سعد الشهراني; died August 2015) was a major general of the Royal Saudi Land Forces who was killed during the Saudi-led intervention in the Yemeni Civil War. He commanded the 18th Brigade and was killed by an artillery strike from Yemen by the Houthis while inspecting troops at a border post. He was one of the most senior Saudi officers killed in the cross-border fire during the Yemeni conflict.
