= Saleh Al-Qadhi =

Mayor of Asir Region in Saudi Arabia

Saleh bin Abdullah Al-Qadi
- صالح بن عبد الله القاضي

Mayor of Asir Region
- Incumbent
- Assumed office April 9, 2015

Acting Mayor of Medina

'Asir Region communal council member

Personal details
- Born: January 11, 1959 (age 67) Medina, Saudi Arabia
- Education: King Faisal University (B.S. in Agricultural engineering)

Saleh bin Abdullah Al-Qadhi (Arabic: صالح بن عبد الله القاضي; born January 11, 1959) is the current Mayor of 'Asir Region, Saudi Arabia. He is the former Acting Mayor of Medina and previously served in the 'Asir Region communal council.

He has over thirty years of experience in private and public sectors. He received a bachelor's degree in Agricultural engineering from King Faisal University, al-Hasa.

Al-Qadhi is committed to providing the citizens improved infrastructures and recently implementing a major public transportation program for commuter, tram, water ferries, buses, bridges and stations. He is encouraging PPP to provide projects for housing, commercial development, leisure and recreational.

== Biography ==
=== Early life and education ===
Al-Qadhi, born on January 11, 1959, in Medina, Saudi Arabia, he graduated high school from Medina. Al-Qadhi received a B.S. from King Faisal University in Agricultural engineering.
