= Al-Mushayt =

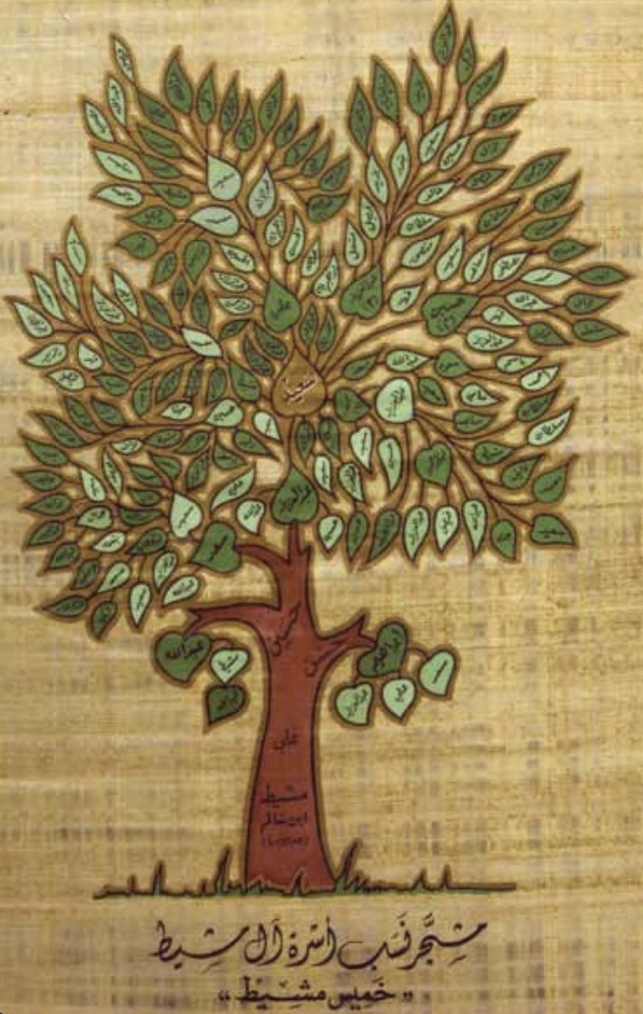
- The family tree of the Al-Mushait family in Khamis Mushait Governorate
- Country: Saudi Arabia
- Current region: Khamis Mushait
- Founder: Mushait bin Salem
- Current head: Saeed bin Hussain bin Mashaith

Al-Mushayt (Arabic: آل مُشَيْط) is a family from the Al-Ghanem branch of the Shahran tribe in Saudi Arabia. They are recognized as sheikhs and leaders of the Shahran tribe. The family is well known in Khamis Mushait and also in Wadi Bisha, where they are often referred to as Bisha Mushayt.

== Lineage ==
The Al-Mishait family is one of the families of Al-Ghanoum from Al-Rashid of the Shahran tribe.

The lineage of Al-Mishait traces back to Mishait bin Salem bin Hussein bin Ibrahim bin Saad bin Muslih bin Ali Al-Ghanoumi Al-Rashidi Al-Shahrani.

Al-Rashid are the descendants of Ajram bin Nahis bin Afras bin Half bin Aftal, who is Khath'am bin Anmar.

It is also mentioned that Al-Mishait is one of the branches of the Shahran tribe, but the more likely view is that they belong to Al-Rashid, the descendants of Ajram.
