= Khath'am =

Banu Khath'am بنو خثعم
- Adnanite/Qahtanite (disputed)
- Banner of Banu Khath'am from the Battle of Siffin
- Ethnicity: Arab
- Nisba: Al-Khath'ami الخثعمي
- Location: Southeastern Arabia
- Descended from: Khath'am ibn Anmar
- Religion: Paganism, later Islam

Khath'am (Arabic: خثعم, romanized: Khathʿam) was an ancient and medieval Arab tribe which traditionally dwelt in southwestern Arabia. They took part either in cooperation or opposition to the 6th-century expedition of the Aksumite ruler Abraha against Mecca. After initial hostility, they embraced Islam and a played a role in the early Muslim conquests of the 630s. The tribe of Shahran in Yemen and Saudi Arabia is a principal clan of the Khath'am.

== Origins ==
The genealogical origins of the Khath'am were disputed by the medieval Arab historians and genealogists. Ibn Hisham (d. 833) and Ibn Qutayba (d. 889) proposed, based on information provided to them by the "genealogists of Mudar", that Khath'am were Adnanites, the overarching grouping of all north Arabian tribes. Accordingly, the tribe's line of descent was Khath'am ibn Anmar ibn Nizar ibn Ma'ad ibn Adnan. However, Ibn al-Kalbi (d. 819) held that they were descendants of the Sabaeans of South Arabia and that their genealogy was Khath'am (birth name Aftal) ibn Anmar ibn Irash ibn Amr ibn al-Ghawth (al-Ghawth was the purported father of the Azd tribe). According to the modern historian Giorgio Levi Della Vida, the Khath'am were most likely a confederation of smaller tribes with different origins. The name of the tribe possibly stems from the Arabic phrase takhath'ama, which means "to smear oneself with blood" as a result of a pact. In their traditional alliances or expeditions, the tribe was typically associated with South Arabian groupings. The main clans of the Khath'am are the Shahran, Nahish and Aklub, the latter said to have descended from the Rabi'a ibn Nizar tribe and entered the Khath'am through a pact.

== History ==
From at least the 6th century CE, the Khath'am dwelt in the areas of Turubah, Bisha, Tabala and Jurash, all in the mountainous area of southwestern Arabia, between the towns of Najran and Ta'if and on the caravan route between Yemen and Mecca. At Tabala, the tribe worshiped the cult of Dhu'l-Khalasa, along with the tribes of Bajila (which were traditionally considered kinsmen of the Khath'am), Bahila and Banu Daws. According to the medieval Shia Muslim scholars al-Majlisi (d. 1699) and al-Tabarsi (d. 1153) and the Sunni Muslim scholar al-Bayhaqi (d. 1066), the Khath'am, along with the South Arabian tribes of Akk and Ash'ar, formed the majority of troops in the ranks of Abraha, the Aksumite ruler of Yemen, in the mid-6th century. These same accounts hold that once Abraha reached Mecca to destroy the Kaaba, then the principal sanctuary for the polytheistic Arabs, the Khath'am and the Ash'ar refused to participate. The historian Ibn Habib (d. 859) also notes that the Khath'am under their chieftain Nufayl ibn Habib joined the army of Abraha, while the historian Ibn Ishaq (d. 767) holds that the Khath'am were not a component of Abraha's army and, under Nufayl's command, fought against Abraha in South Arabia on the Aksumite leader's way to Mecca; the tribe was defeated and Nufayl was captured.

The most well-known battle involving the Khath'am in the pre-Islamic period was the day of Fayf al-Rih in which the tribe under their leader, the warrior poet Anas ibn Mudrik, led an alliance including the Madhhij tribe and routed the Banu Amir tribe and wounded their leader Amir ibn al-Tufayl. Anas again led his tribe to victory against Banu Jusham led by the poet and brigand Sulayk ibn Sulaka. Anas lived on for a considerable period after the advent of Islam in the 620s. The tribe's initial reaction to the Islamic prophet Muhammad was hostile, but eventually sent a delegation accepting the religion, to which Muhammad responded by declaring all of the tribe's blood feuds dating from the pre-Islamic period were abolished. A section of the tribe rebelled against the nascent Muslim state in Medina, but they ultimately submitted following the destruction of the Dhu'l-Khalasa shrine by Jarir ibn Abd Allah al-Bajali. Members of the tribe participated in the early Muslim conquests in Syria and Iraq during the 630s and they formed part of the Arab garrisons of Kufa and Basra.

== See also ==
- Qahafah Tribe

== Bibliography ==
- Levi Della Vida, G. (1978). "Khathʿam". In van Donzel, E.; Lewis, B.; Pellat, Ch. & Bosworth, C. E. (eds.). The Encyclopaedia of Islam, Second Edition. Volume IV: Iran–Kha. Leiden: E. J. Brill. pp. 1105–1106. ISBN 978-90-04-05745-6. OCLC 758278456.
- Kister, M. J. (June 1972). "Some Reports concerning Mecca from Jāhiliyya to Islam". Journal of the Economic and Social History of the Orient. 15 (1): 61–93. JSTOR 3596312.
