= Khamis Mushait =

City in Saudi Arabia

Khamis Mushayt خميس مشيط
- City
- Location within Saudi Arabia
- Coordinates: 18°18′N 42°44′E
- Country: Saudi Arabia
- Province: Asir

Government
  - Mayor: Khalid bin Mushayt
- Elevation: 2,066 m (6,778 ft)

Population (Census 2022)
  - City: 535,065
  - Metro: 1,353,000

GDP (PPP, constant 2015 values)
  - Year: 2023
  - Total (Metro): $31.5 billion
  - Per capita: $55,200
- Time zone: UTC+3 (EAT)
  - Summer (DST): UTC+3 (EAT)
- Postal code: 62411
- Area code: +966-17
- Website: Khamis Mushayt Municipality

Khamis Mushayt or Khamis Mushait (Arabic: خميس مشيط, Ḫamīs Mušayṭ Arabic pronunciation: [xamiːs muʃajtˤ], locally: [xamiːs‿ɪmʃeːtˤ]) is a city in south-west Saudi Arabia, located east of Abha, the provincial seat of the Asir Province 884 kilometres (549 mi) from the national capital of Riyadh. It is the capital of the Shahran tribe in the Asir region. It is the fifth-largest city in Saudi Arabia after Riyadh, Jeddah, Mecca and Medina, with an estimated metro population of 1,353,000 as of 2017. Khamis Mushayt is noted for being the fourth largest trading centre in Saudi Arabia, and its military airbase.

== History ==
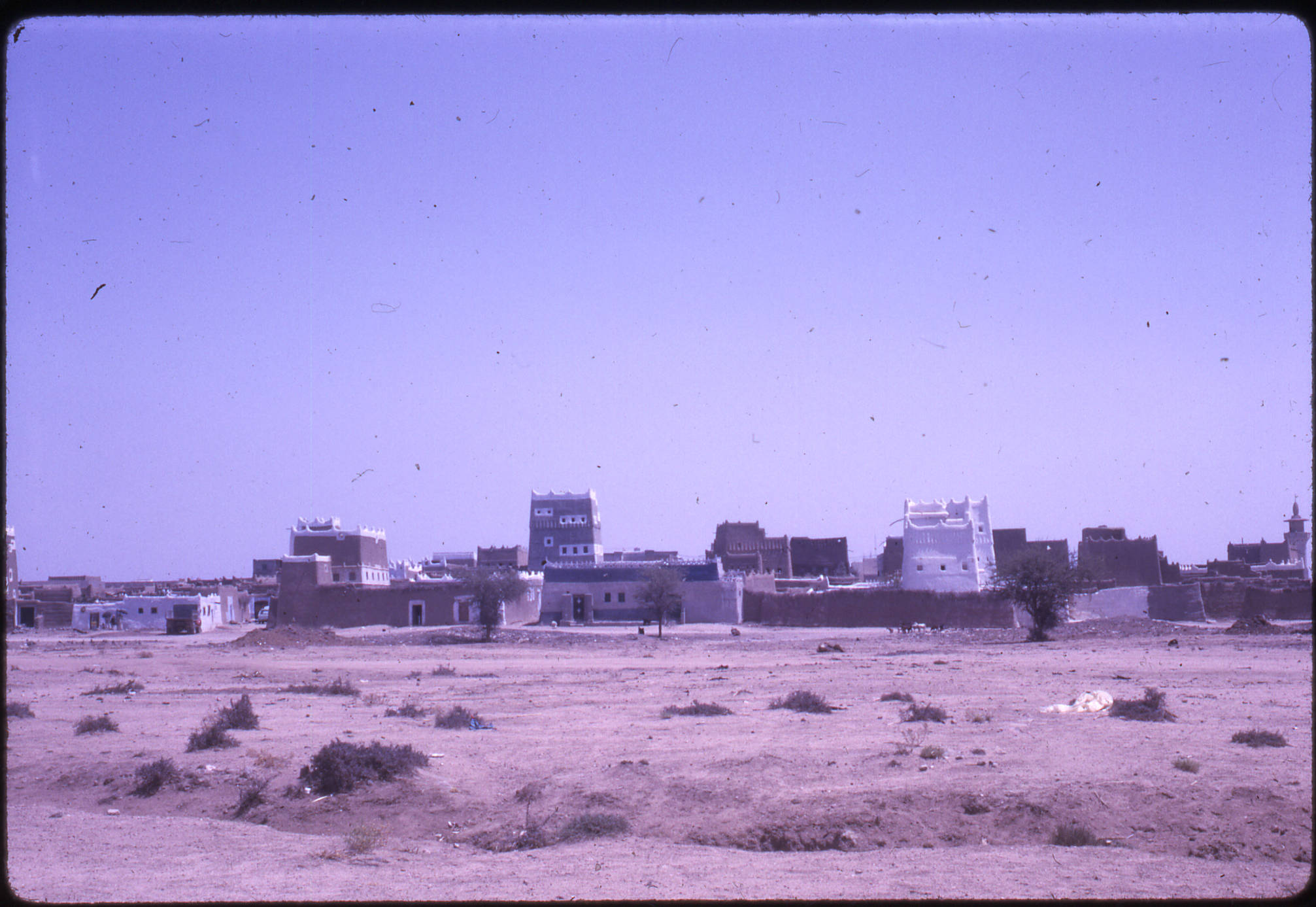
1966 skyline of the village

Until the 1970s, Khamis Mushayt was a small town of less than 50,000 servicing the surrounding mild-climate agricultural region. Since then its population has grown dramatically to reach over 1,200,000. The city is surrounded by farms producing agricultural crops.

King Khalid Air Base (KMX) has a 12,400 ft (3,780 m) paved runway without customs facilities. The base was designed and built by US Army and Air Force engineers in the 1960s and 70s and has F-15 service facilities. During the Gulf War in 1991, the US Air Force had a base here from which they launched bombers on Baghdad.

Khamis Mushayt was known by that name since the 1760s, it has been named after the family name of Al-Mushayt, referring to a man called Mushayt who protected this city and like deem Mushayt, Mushayt it has been referred to MushaYt Ibn Salem the head of Shahran tribe and the guardian of the market.

== Climate ==
Khamis Mushayt has a hot desert climate (Köppen climate classification BWh) bordering closely on a hot semi-desert climate (Köppen BSh).

Climate data for Khamis Mushait (King Khalid Air Base) (1991–2020)
Month	Jan	Feb	Mar	Apr	May	Jun	Jul	Aug	Sep	Oct	Nov	Dec	Year
Record high °C (°F)	28.8 (83.8)	30.6 (87.1)	30.2 (86.4)	33.0 (91.4)	34.7 (94.5)	37.3 (99.1)	38.0 (100.4)	36.0 (96.8)	34.9 (94.8)	33.5 (92.3)	31.0 (87.8)	28.6 (83.5)	38.0 (100.4)
Mean daily maximum °C (°F)	21.8 (71.2)	23.5 (74.3)	24.8 (76.6)	27.2 (81.0)	30.3 (86.5)	32.3 (90.1)	32.1 (89.8)	32.0 (89.6)	30.8 (87.4)	27.3 (81.1)	24.6 (76.3)	22.8 (73.0)	27.5 (81.5)
Daily mean °C (°F)	14.7 (58.5)	16.3 (61.3)	18.1 (64.6)	20.1 (68.2)	22.7 (72.9)	24.9 (76.8)	24.5 (76.1)	24.0 (75.2)	23.5 (74.3)	20.1 (68.2)	17.1 (62.8)	15.2 (59.4)	20.1 (68.2)
Mean daily minimum °C (°F)	8.6 (47.5)	10.2 (50.4)	12.2 (54.0)	14.1 (57.4)	16.3 (61.3)	18.2 (64.8)	18.4 (65.1)	17.9 (64.2)	16.5 (61.7)	13.3 (55.9)	10.7 (51.3)	8.7 (47.7)	13.8 (56.8)
Record low °C (°F)	1.0 (33.8)	2.4 (36.3)	4.5 (40.1)	8.0 (46.4)	10.8 (51.4)	12.0 (53.6)	8.3 (46.9)	11.2 (52.2)	11.8 (53.2)	8.2 (46.8)	2.6 (36.7)	1.9 (35.4)	1.0 (33.8)
Average precipitation mm (inches)	4.9 (0.19)	8.6 (0.34)	19.3 (0.76)	35.7 (1.41)	34.4 (1.35)	10.4 (0.41)	22.5 (0.89)	29.4 (1.16)	3.4 (0.13)	4.8 (0.19)	5.6 (0.22)	1.1 (0.04)	180.0 (7.09)
Average precipitation days (≥ 1.0 mm)	0.7	0.7	1.7	4.1	4.5	1.3	3.3	3.5	0.6	0.7	1.3	0.3	22.6
Average relative humidity (%)	65	52	51	50	44	39	45	38	37	38	56	65	48
Mean monthly sunshine hours	291.4	248.6	288.3	267.0	279.0	282.0	279.0	226.3	276.0	297.6	288.0	275.9	3,299.1
Mean daily sunshine hours	9.4	8.8	9.3	8.9	9.0	9.4	9.0	7.3	9.2	9.6	9.6	8.9	9.0
Source 1: NOAA
Source 2: Deutscher Wetterdienst (humidity 1970–1979, sun 1986-1990)

== Notable landmarks ==
Khamis Mushayt has several souks, including Khamis Souk and Silver Souq, both of which are noted for their silver jewellery, and Spice Souk. Notable hotels include Mushayt Palace Hotel and Trident Hotel. Also of note is Al-Hayat Hospital and Khamis Mushayt Mosque.

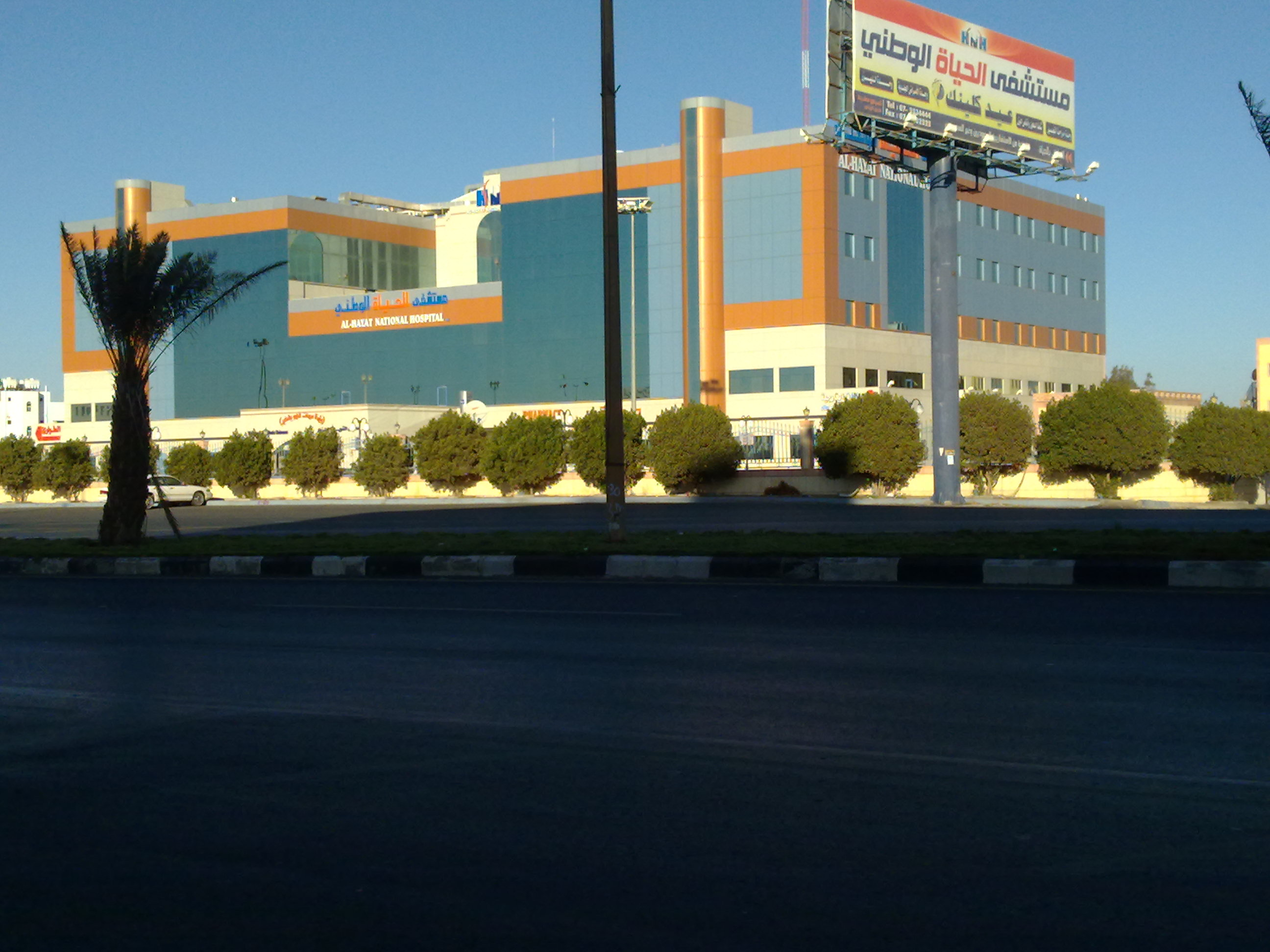
Al-Hayat Hospital

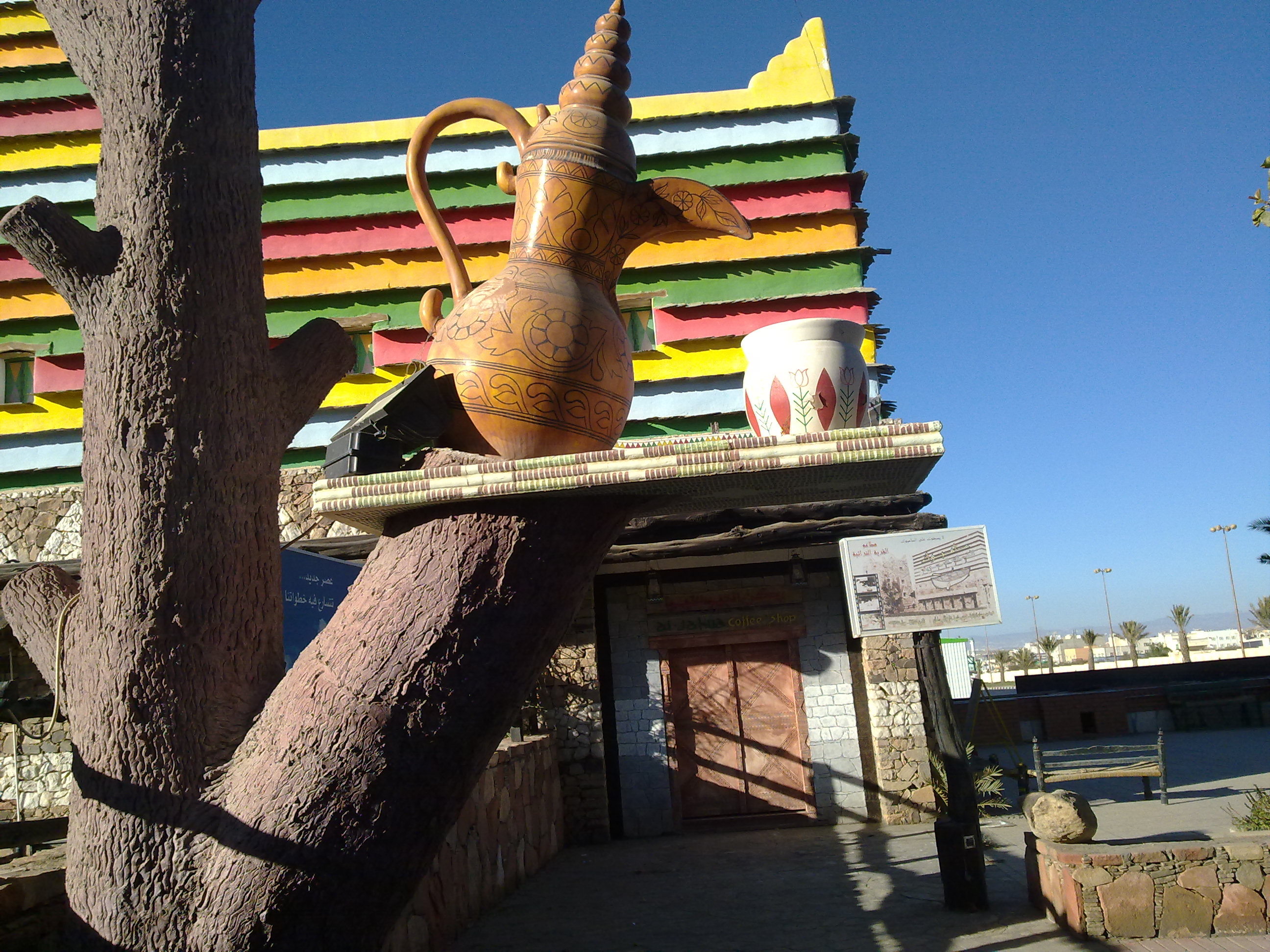
Statue of a Dallah in the Heritage area.

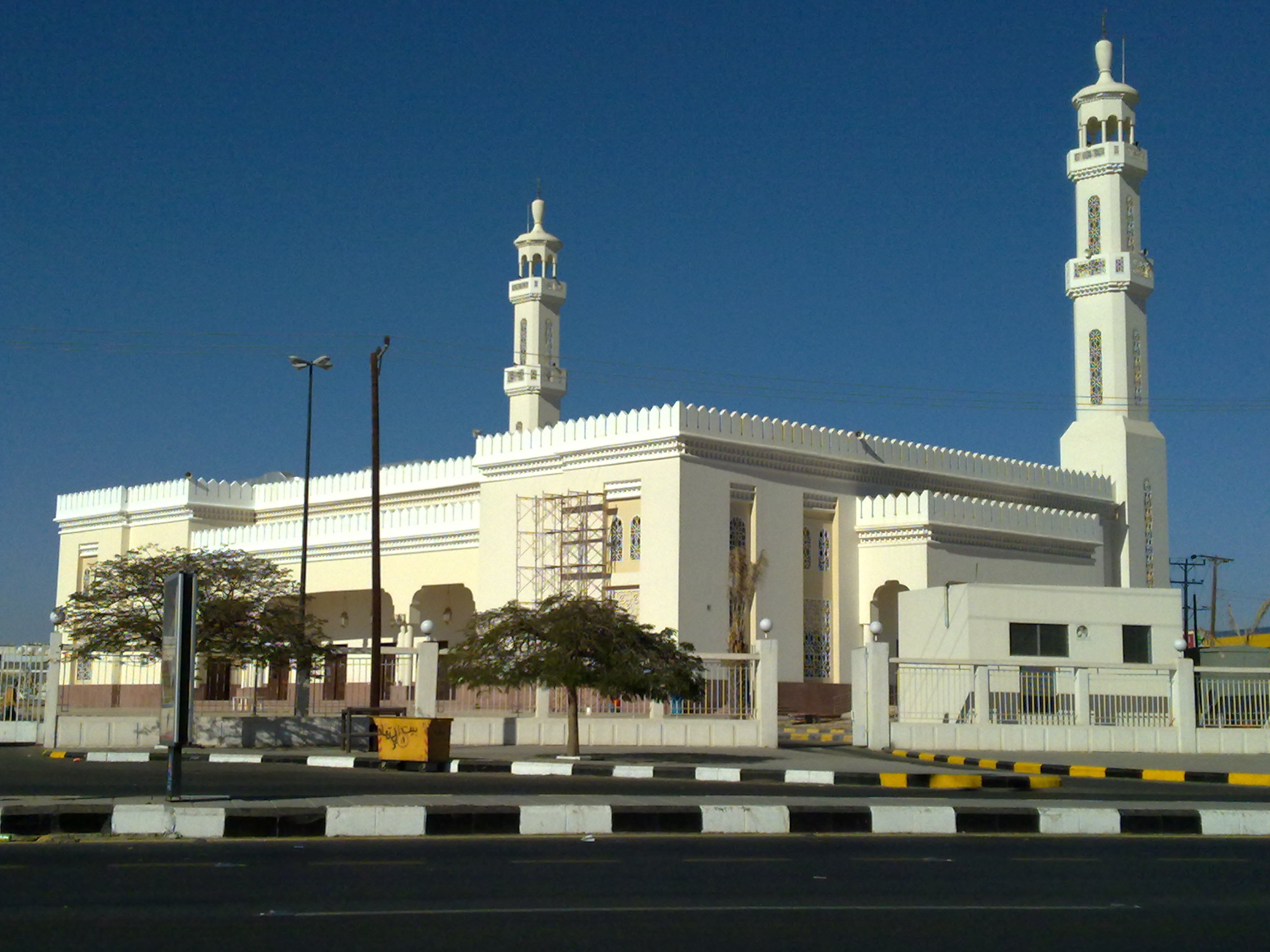
King Fahd Mosque

== See also ==
Al-Mushayt
