= Dhahran Al Janub =

Governorate of Saudi Arabia

Dhahran Al-Janub محافظة ظهران الجنوب
- Governorate
- Al-Hawzah heritage village of Dhahran al-Janub

- Location within Saudi Arabia
- Coordinates: 17°40′N 43°30′E
- Country: Saudi Arabia
- Province: Asir Province

Population (2016)
  - Total: 43,829
- Time zone: UTC+03:00 (SAST)

Dhahran Al-Janub is one of the governorates in Asir Province, Saudi Arabia.
