= Ibrahim Hamzi =

Saudi Arabian brigadier general (died 2015)

- إبراهيم بن عمر إبراهيم حمزي
- Born: Ibrahim bin Omar Ibrahim Hamzi
- Died: September 2015; Jizan Region, Saudi Arabia
- Military career
- Allegiance: Saudi Arabia
- Branch: Royal Saudi Land Forces
- Rank: Brigadier general
- Commands: 8th "King Fahd" Armoured Brigade (deputy)
- Conflicts: Saudi Arabian-led intervention in Yemen (DOW)

Ibrahim Omar Ibrahim Hamzi (Arabic: إبراهيم بن عمر إبراهيم حمزي; died September 2015) was a brigadier general of the Royal Saudi Land Forces, deputy commander of the 8th Armoured Brigade near Jizan. He was killed during the Saudi-led intervention in the Yemeni civil war in late September 2015, being one of the most senior officers of the coalition of Arab nations to be killed. Hamzi died while being taken to a hospital.
