= Muhayil =

Governorate of Saudi Arabia

Coordinates: 18°33′N 42°03′E

- Town
- Interactive map of Muhayil
- Country: Saudi Arabia
- Province: Asir Province

Population (2022)
  - Town: 97,967
  - Metro: 230,537
- Time zone: UTC+3 (EAT)
  - Summer (DST): UTC+3 (EAT)

Muhayil (Arabic: محايل عسير) is a Saudi city and governorate belonging to the Asir Province. It is located in the southwest of the Kingdom of Saudi Arabia, about 80 km northwest of the city of Abha, the capital of the Asir Province. It is bordered on the north by Bariq Governorate, on the south by Rijal Alma’ Governorate, and on the east by the city of Abha, the headquarters of the Emirate of the Asir Province. And from the west, Al-Barak Governorate is one of the governorates in Asir Province, Saudi Arabia. At the 2022 census, the governorate had a total population of 230,537.

Due to its warm winter climate, Muhayil is considered an important winter resort within Asir Province. While the higher-altitude settlements around Abha are considerably cooler in winter, Muhayil lies in a lower and warmer zone between the Asir highlands and the Tihamah coastal plain. The town is also a regional trade and service centre for numerous villages and settlements in western Asir.

== Geography ==
Muhayil is located in the western part of Asir Province, between the highlands around Abha and the plains leading toward the Red Sea. The governorate covers more than 20,000 square kilometres and includes more than 800 villages and settlements.

The climate is significantly warmer than in the higher-altitude central Asir region. Summer temperatures can reach about 45 °C, while the climate is more temperate in winter. Average annual rainfall is given as about 30 millimetres, and humidity at around 18 percent.

== History ==
Before state-led development in the 20th century, the region was characterised by small-scale agriculture, livestock husbandry, local markets and tribal structures. With the incorporation of Asir into the modern Saudi state and the expansion of roads, administration, schools and health services, Muhayil developed into a regional centre in the western part of the province. In more recent times, Muhayil has gained importance above all as a winter destination within Asir.

== Demographics ==
At the 2022 census, the locality of Muhayil had a total population of 97,967, of whom about 59.8 percent were Saudi nationals.

Year	Population
2004	48,760
2010	56,953
2022	97,967

== Economy ==
Muhayil is a trade and service centre for the western part of Asir Province. The local economy is based on retail, public administration, small-scale services, agriculture, tourism and seasonal events. The climate is temperate, allowing the cultivation of fruit, cereals and vegetables. Traditional markets continue to play a role in the sale of local products.

Muhayil is particularly known as a winter destination within Asir Province. While the higher mountain settlements of Asir are colder in winter, Muhayil attracts visitors from Abha and other parts of the region because of its warmer climate.

One of the best-known events is the Mohail Hawana Winter Festival. In January 2024, the festival attracted more than 50,000 visitors. It included exhibition areas, stalls selling local products, clothing, jewellery and perfumes, as well as food and entertainment offerings.

== Attractions ==
Scenic and cultural attractions in and around Muhayil include wadis, old wells, traditional markets, and remains of historic settlements and fortifications. The regional tourism platform Discover Aseer lists, among other things, old castles and forts, rock inscriptions and historical written evidence, especially in Wadi Nakhalin, as well as al-Ghaleelah well as local points of interest.
