= Dhu'l-Khalasa =

Pre-Islamic Arabian god or temple

Dhu'l-Khalasa (Arabic: ذُو الْخَلَصَة ḏū l-ḵalaṣa) was a god or temple of pre-Islamic Arabia, associated with the worship of the tribe of Banu Daws. This cult is only attested in Islamic sources, especially hadith and in the Book of Idols of Hisham ibn al-Kalbi. In some sources, Dhu'l-Khalasa appears as the name of a god. According to other sources, the god was called al-Khalasa, whereas Dhu'l-Khalasa was the name of the building or temple that this idol is associated with. A third interpretation in Islamic sources is that al-Khalasa is the name of the people who worshiped at the Dhu'l-Khalasa temple. Islamic tradition described the temple as one of the several non-Meccan Kaabas at the time. It was called the "Southern Kaaba" (al-kaʿba al-yamaniyya) to distinguish it from the Kaaba of Mecca (al-kaʿba al-shāmiyya).

According to Islamic tradition, the temple of Dhu'l-Khalasa was demolished in April and May 632 CE, in 10 AH of the Islamic calendar. The demolition was carried out by Jarir ibn ʿAbdullah al-Bajali on the order of Muhammad, leaving the shrine in ruins.

== Islamic primary sources ==
From classical sources there is an association between the god with divination and fertility. Hisham ibn al-Kalbi quotes from a certain man: “O Dhul-Khalasa, were the one wronged, your father the one murdered and buried, you would not have forbidden the killing of the enemy.” This incident is usually ascribed to Imru' al-Qais, when shuffling divination arrows before the idol, gave negative results for pursuing the vengeance of his father's death.

Sahih al-Bukhari, 9:88:232 records the following in a report about the signs of the end-times: "Abu Hurairah said, I heard the Prophet say, The Hour will not come until the buttocks of the women of Daws are set in motion while going around Dhul-Khalasa. Dhul-Khalasa was an idol worshiped by the tribe of Daws during the Jahiliyyah."

=== Demolition of the temple of Dhu'l-Khalasa ===
The Muslim historian Hisham ibn al-Kalbi, mentions this event as follows:

When the Apostle of God captured Mecca and the Arabs embraced Islam, among the delegates who came to pay their homage was Jarir ibn-'Abdullah. He came to the Apostle and embraced Islam before him. Thereupon the Apostle addressed him saying, "O Jarir! Will you not rid me of Dhul-Khalasa?" Jarir replied, "Yea." So the Apostle dispatched him to destroy it. He set out until he got to the Banu Ahmas of the Bajilah [tribe] and with them he proceeded to Dhul-Khalasa. There he was met by the Khath'am and the Bajilah, who resisted him and attempted to defend Dhul-Khalasa. He, therefore, fought them and killed a hundred men of the Bajilah, its custodians, and many of the Khath'am; while of the Banu Qubafah ibn-'Amir ibn-Khath'am he killed two hundred. having defeated them and forced them into flight, he demolished the building which stood over Dhul-Khalasa and set it on fire. A certain woman of the Banu Khath'am thereupon said:

"The Banu Umamah, each wielding his spear,
Were slaughtered at al-Wahyah, their abode;
They came to defend their shrine, only to find
Lions with brandished swords clamoring for blood.
The women of the Khath'am were, then, humiliated
By the men of the Ahmas, and abased."

According to many of the Ulamaa of the Sunnah and Hadeeth of the past, Hishaam ibnul Akhbaaree al-Baahir Muhammad ibn as-Saa'ib bin Bishr al-Kalbee ash-Shee'ee al-Koofee was only a person who spent his nights chatting, talking constantly about genealogies, stories and nothing was known from him of (correct) chains of narrations.

One of Hishaam ibnul Kalbee's bogus claims was that he memorized the entire Qur'aan in three days!

−Ibn-Al-Kalbi, Hisham, The Book of Idols, pp. 31–2

The incident is also referenced in the Sahih Bukhari hadith collection:

In the Pre-Islamic Period of Ignorance there was a house called Dhul-Khalasa or al-Ka'ba al-Yamaniya or al-Ka'ba ash-Shamiya. Jarir said "Allah's Messenger (ﷺ) said to me, "Won't you relieve me from Dhul-Khalasa?" I replied, "Yes, (I will relieve you)." So I proceeded along with one-hundred and fifty cavalry from Ahmas tribe who were skillful in riding horses. I used not to sit firm over horses, so I informed the Prophet (ﷺ) of that, and he stroke my chest with his hand till I saw the marks of his hand over my chest and he said, O Allah! Make him firm and one who guides others and is guided (on the right path).' Since then I have never fallen from a horse. Dhul-l--Khulasa was a house in Yemen belonging to the tribe of Khatham and Bajaila, and in it there were idols which were worshipped, and it was called Al-Ka`ba." Jarir went there, burnt it with fire and dismantled it. When Jarir reached Yemen, there was a man who used to foretell and give good omens by casting arrows of divination. Someone said to him. "The messenger of Allah's Messenger (ﷺ) is present here and if he should get hold of you, he would chop off your neck." One day while he was using them (i.e. arrows of divination), Jarir stopped there and said to him, "Break them (i.e. the arrows) and testify that None has the right to be worshipped except Allah, or else I will chop off your neck." So the man broke those arrows and testified that none has the right to be worshipped except Allah. Then Jarir sent a man called Abu Artata from the tribe of Ahmas to the Prophet to convey the good news (of destroying Dhu-l-Khalasa). So when the messenger reached the Prophet, he said, "O Allah's Messenger (ﷺ)! By Him Who sent you with the Truth, I did not leave it till it was like a scabby camel." Then the Prophet (ﷺ) blessed the horses of Ahmas and their men five times. Sahih al-Bukhari, 5:59:643

The event is also mentioned in Sahih al-Bukhari, 5:59:642, Sahih al-Bukhari, 5:59:643 and Sahih al-Bukhari, 5:59:645.

== See also ==
- Al-Uzza#Destruction of temple
- List of expeditions of Muhammad

== Sources ==
- Hawting, Gerald (1999). The Idea of Idolatry and the Emergence of Islam: From Polemic to History. Cambridge University Press.
- King, G. R. D. (2004). "The Paintings of the Pre-Islamic Kaʿba". Muqarnas. 21. JSTOR 1523357.
