= Asir =

South-Western administrative region of Saudi Arabia

Asir عَسِيْرٌ
- Province
- Asir Province منطقة عسير
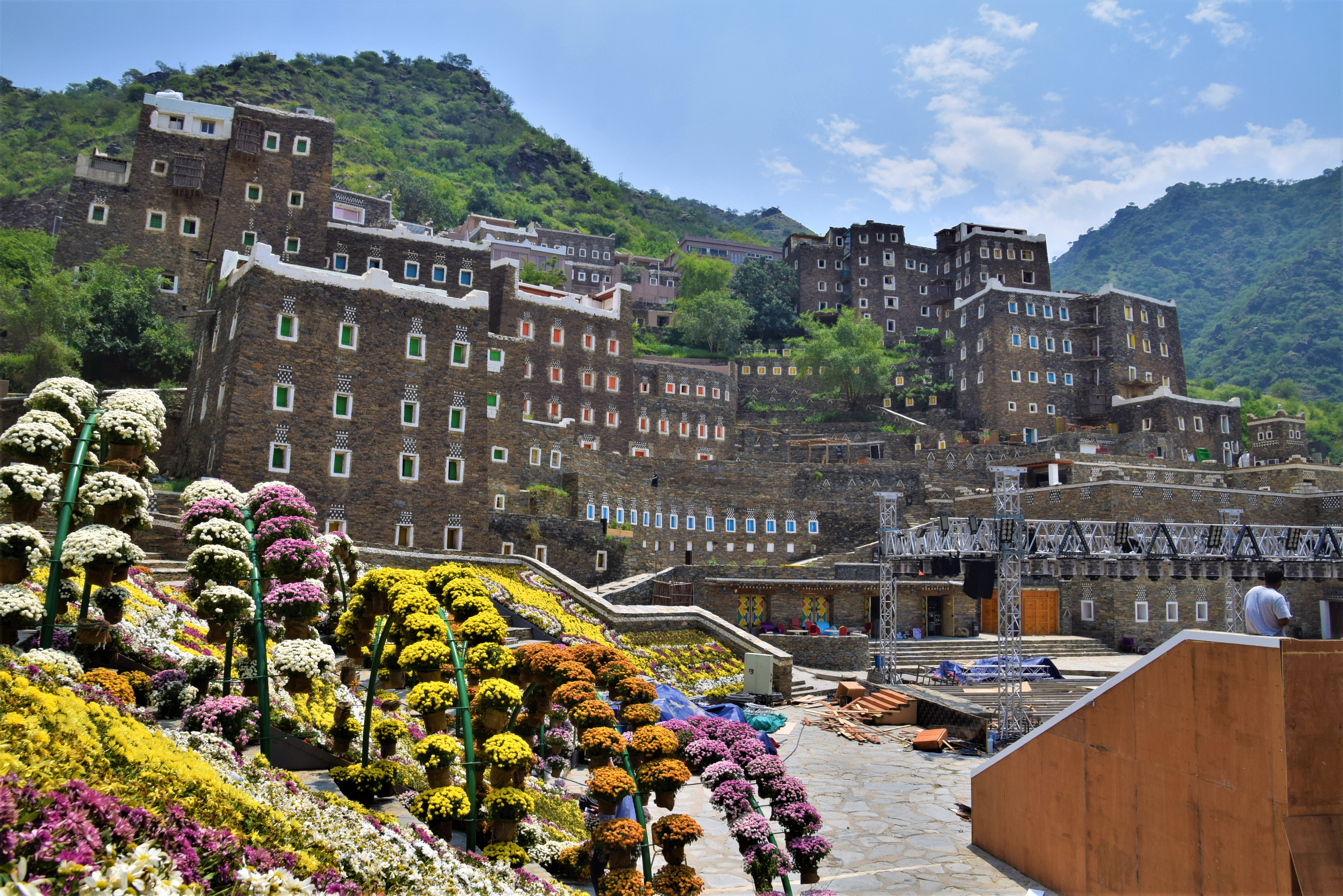
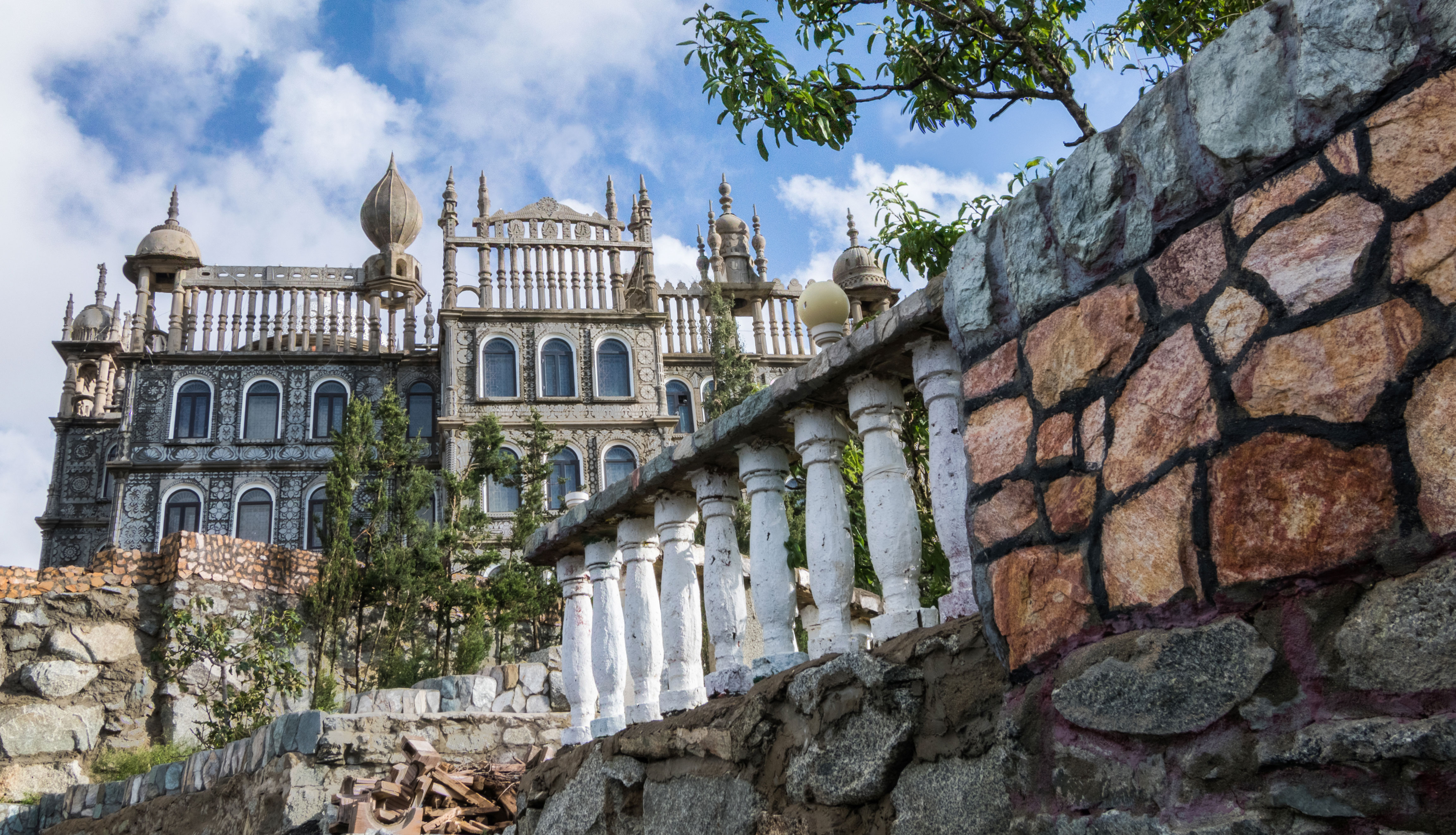
- Rijal Almaa Heritage Village Al-Maqar Palace, Al-Namas Al-Hawzah Heritage Village, Dhahran Al-Janub

- Seal Wordmark

- Map of Saudi Arabia with Asir highlighted
- Coordinates: 19°0′N 43°0′E
- Country: Saudi Arabia
- Region: South Arabia
- Seat: Abha
- Largest city: Khamis Mushait
- Governorates: 17

Government
  - Type: Development Authority / Municipality
  - Body: Asir Development Authority (Upper body); Asir Municipality (Lower body)
  - Governor: Turki bin Talal
  - Mayor: Saleh Al-Qadhi

Area
  - Total: 76,693 km^{2} (29,611 sq mi)

Population (2022 census)
  - Total: 2,024,285
- Demonym(s): Asiri (Male); Asiriyah (Female)
- Time zone: UTC+03:00 (SAST)
- ISO 3166-2: SA–14
- Area code: 017
- Website: ars.gov.sa discoveraseer.com/en

Asir, (Note: Arabic: عَسِيْر, romanized: ʿAsīr) (Note: also spelled Aseer, Assir) officially the Aseer Province, (Note: Arabic: مِنْطَقَةُ عَسِيْرٌ, romanized: Minṭaqat ʿAsīr) is a province of Saudi Arabia in southern Arabia. It has an area of 76,693 square kilometres (29,611 sq mi), and an estimated population of 2,024,285 (in 2022). Abha is its seat and second-largest city, after Khamis Mushait. Asir is bounded by the Mecca Province to the north and west, Al-Baha Province to the northwest, Riyadh Province to the northeast, Najran Province to the southeast, and Jazan Province and the Saada Governorate of Yemen to the south.

== Etymology ==
The origin of the name "Asir" remains a subject of debate among historians. One theory, proposed by Al-Masudi in his work The Meadows of Gold, suggests that the region was originally known as the Land of Azd.

Another popular hypothesis suggests that the name "Asir" derives from the Arabic term ʿUsrah (Arabic: عُسرة, lit. 'Hardship'). This theory comes from the fact that the region's terrain is rugged, which can be challenging to navigate.

A third perspective proposed by Fuad Hamza in his book Fi bilad ʿAseer, links the name to the historical prominence of Banu Asir. As the tribe gained power and influence, its name came to encompass the surrounding territories and tribes. This association was reinforced by the close ties between the Asir tribe and many of the ruling emirs in the region, including those from the Al Yazid, Al Muthami, and Al A'ad families.

== History ==
=== Ancient history ===
In 25 B.C., Aelius Gallus marched his legions south from Ancient Egypt on an expedition of 1,300 miles (2,100 kilometres), to take control of the ancient overland trade routes between the Mediterranean Sea and what is now Hadhramaut in Yemen. The Romans wanted control of those routes because they were desperate for money and hoped to raise some by capturing Marib, capital of Saba, and taking control of the trade in incense – then a priceless commodity – and other valuable aromatics. As it turned out, however, the expedition was a disaster and little information about Asir emerged.

=== Modern history ===
When the First Saudi state was destroyed by the Ottoman Empire in 1818, the Asiris continued to fight the Ottoman Egypt forces in their region tenaciously. With the withdrawal of the Ottomans in 1840, the dynasty of Al-Ayedh, also of Mughayd, took control of the Asir highlands. The Al-Ayedh generally allied themselves to the Saudis, who had re-established their dynasty in 1824, but did not formally enter under their command. As the Al-Ayedh attempted to expand into the Tihamah lowlands (present-day Jazan Province), the Ottoman Turks felt provoked to invade and occupy the highlands. They defeated and executed the leader of Al Ayedh in 1872 and established a mutasarrifiyya (a sub-governorate) in Abha attached to the Yemen vilayet. Their rule, however, seldom extended far from the isolated forts where their troops were garrisoned.

In about 1906, Muhammad ibn Ali al-Idrisi, a descendant of Ahmad ibn Idris al-Fasi, began to establish political control of Asir. After negotiations with Italy, which had interests nearby in Somalia, the Idrisi forces of Muhammad came into conflict with Ottoman forces in Abha. The Idrisis were defeated in 1911 by Hashemites forces under Hussein bin Ali, the Sharif of Mecca, then still loyal to the Ottomans, but the tide turned when Muhammad ibn Ali concluded a secret military alliance with Great Britain (by then at war with the Ottomans) in 1915, and Sharif Hussein later switched sides and joined the British against the Ottomans.

After the end of World War I, Muhammad ibn Ali became ruler of an internationally recognized sovereign state, the Emirate of Asir, until he died in 1920. The territories of the emirate reached from Abha in the north to Hodeidah in the south. Muhammad's successors were, however, unable to resist the growing power of Ibn Saud, who began annexing Asir and its neighboring regions after Muhammad's death, initially intervening under the pretext of mediating between the Al-Ayedh of Asir and the Idrisis. The Saudis took control of the regional capital Abha in 1920, and incorporated the rest of Asir by 1923. Ibn Saud later successfully fought off a rival claim for the region by the Zaydi Imam of the neighboring Kingdom of Yemen in 1934.

By 1920, however, Ibn Saud, the founder of the modern Saudi state, had begun to recoup the losses of the House of Saud, and to unify most of the peninsula under his rule. As part of this campaign, he sent his Bedouin warriors also known as the Ikhwan to occupy Asir, and the ruler of the region, Hasan Al Idrissi, had to leave. Therefore, he asked for protection from Imam Yahya, the ruler of Yemen and went there. From then on Asir has been controlled by the House of Saud, a situation formalized in 1934 with the signing of the Treaty of Taif between Saudi Arabia and Yemen. Even then the region was still largely unknown to the West. In 1932, St John Philby, one of the first Europeans to explore and map the peninsula, did enter Asir, but as he did not publish his observations until 1952, the area remained one of the blank spots on the world's map. In 1935 Asir was made a separate governorate.

Since 2014, hundreds of Ethiopian refugees trying to cross the Saudi Arabia–Yemen border have been killed, with reports of women being raped, by the Saudi Border Guard. According to a 2023 Human Rights Watch report, at least several hundred Ethiopian refugees had been killed between March 2022 and June 2023 while crossing the border "in a pattern that is widespread and systematic." The Saudis have also used explosive weapons.

== Economy ==
Historically, Asir was known for producing coffee, wheat, alfalfa, barley, senna, and frankincense. Wheat was grown in the summer and sesame has been grown in wetter areas of the region. Straw was used to make mats, hats, and baskets while tribes in the area also wove tents from straw.

=== Modern development projects ===
In 2019, the Saudi government launched an infrastructure development project in ʿAsir Region. The project is expected to cost more than 1 billion Saudi Riyals. The provided projects will include health care, transportation and municipal services. The project is in line with the Saudi Vision 2030 to diversify non-petroleum income and activate new resources in Saudi Arabia.

In 2023, Crown Prince Mohammed bin Salman launched Soudah Peaks Project to develop a tourism destination in Saudi Arabia's highest peak, Jabal Soudah. Soudah Peaks is a planned luxury mountain tourism destination located at 3,015 meters above sea level.

== Education ==
The Asir Province is served by several institutions of higher education, the most prominent being King Khalid University (KKU). Established in 1998 through a royal decree that merged the satellite campuses of Imam Muhammad ibn Saud Islamic University and King Saud University, The main campus is located in Abha, with satellite campuses in cities such as Khamis Mushait, Muhayil, and Bisha. The university offers a wide range of undergraduate and graduate programs across fields like medicine, engineering, computer science, humanities, Islamic studies, and business. It enrolls both male and female students.

Primary and secondary education in the province is overseen by the Ministry of Education, which operates a comprehensive network of public schools. These schools serve students from the elementary to high school levels and are distributed across urban centers, mountainous villages, and rural areas, ensuring widespread educational access throughout the province.

In addition to academic institutions, the province hosts numerous technical and vocational education centers managed by the Technical and Vocational Training Corporation (TVTC).

== Geography ==
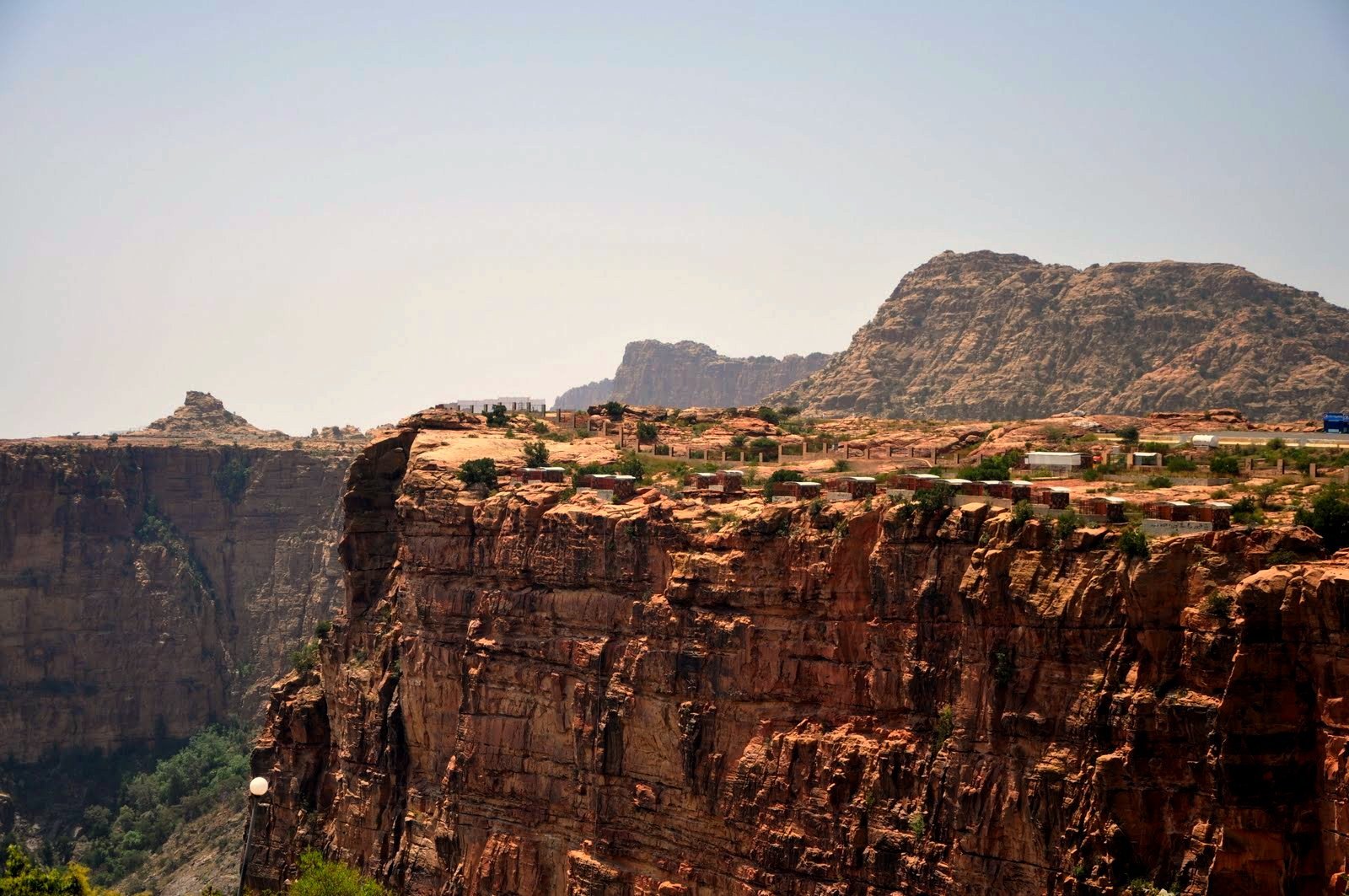
Habala Valley

The Asir Province is situated on a high plateau that receives more rainfall than the rest of the country and contains the country's highest peaks, which rise to almost 3,200 metres (10,500 ft) at Jabal Soudah near Abha. Though data is exceedingly sparse and unreliable, the average annual rainfall in the highlands probably ranges from 300–500 millimetres (12–20 in). It falls in two rainy seasons, the chief one being in March and April, with some rain in the summer. Temperatures are very extreme, with diurnal temperature ranges in the highlands the greatest in the world. It is common for afternoon temperatures to be over 30 °C (86 °F), yet mornings can be extremely frosty and fog can cut visibility to near zero percent. As a result, there is much more natural vegetation in ʿAsir than in any other part of Saudi Arabia, with sheltered areas even containing areas of dense coniferous forests, though more exposed ridges still are very dry. ʿAsir is home to many farmers who chiefly grow wheat and fruit crops. Irrigation has greatly expanded production in modern times. Asir National Park was established in 1981, and extends from the Red Sea coast through the western foothills to the Asir escarpment.

== Population ==
Historical population
Year	Pop.	±% p.a.
1992	1,340,168	—
2004	1,687,939	+1.94%
2010	1,927,087	+2.23%
2022	2,024,285	+0.41%

== Governorates ==
There are 17 governorates in Asir Province, with Abha City serving as the provincial capital and administrative center. As of 2022, Abha City had a population of 422,243.

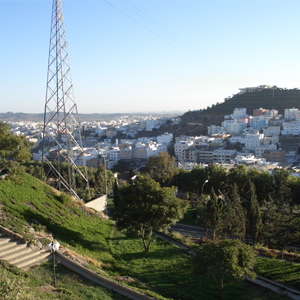
Abha City

Governorates of Asir Province
#	Governorate	Capital	Population (2022)
1	Khamis Mushait	Khamis Mushait	601,305
2	Muhayil	Muhayil	230,537
3	Bisha	Bisha	202,096
4	Ahad Rafidah	Ahad Rafidah	107,894
5	Balqarn	Balqarn	60,012
6	Sarat Ubaida	Sarat Ubaida	57,123
7	Rijal Almaa	Rijal Almaa	50,825
8	Al-Majaridah	Al-Majaridah	48,302
9	Bareq	Bareq	44,880
10	An-Namas	An-Namas	38,409
11	Tathlith	Tathlith	36,451
12	Dhahran Al-Janub	Dhahran Al-Janub	32,099
13	Al-Birk	Al-Birk	22,583
14	Tarib	Tarib	22,298
15	Al-Harajah	Al-Harajah	18,503
16	Tanomah	Tanomah	17,756
17	Al-Amoah	Al-Amoah	10,969

== Transportation ==
=== Road Network ===
- Highway 10 – connects Abha to Najran in the east.

Several ongoing projects aim to improve access to remote villages and tourism sites across the Sarawat Mountains.

=== Air Transport ===
The province is primarily served by Abha International Airport, which offers domestic flights to major Saudi cities and limited international routes. The airport is undergoing expansion and modernization in line with national development goals.

=== Public Transport ===
Public transportation is available in urban centers like Abha and Khamis Mushait, though it remains limited. Ride-hailing services such as Careem and Uber operate in the province.

=== Future Projects ===
The Asir Development Authority has announced strategic transportation initiatives under Saudi Vision 2030, including:

- Development of mountain cable car systems for tourism and local mobility
- Improved connectivity between airports, urban centers, and tourist destinations
- Environmentally friendly transport systems designed to preserve the province’s natural environment.

== List of governors ==
Name	Term of Office	Monarch(s)
Office established
Shuwaish bin Dhuwayhi	1919 – 1920	Abdulaziz
Abdullah bin Suwaylim	1920 – 1921	Abdulaziz
Fahd bin Abdulkarim Al-Uqaili	1921 (a few months)	Abdulaziz
Saad bin Afaysan	1921 – 1923	Abdulaziz
Mohammed bin Saad bin Najifan	1923 (a few months)	Abdulaziz
Abdulaziz bin Ibrahim Al-Ibrahim	1923 – 1924	Abdulaziz
Abdullah bin Ibrahim Al-Askar	1924 – 1933	Abdulaziz
Abdulaziz bin Abdullah Al-Askar	1933 – 1934	Abdulaziz
Turki bin Ahmed Al-Sudairi	1934 – 8 June 1969	Abdulaziz, Saud, Faisal
Fahd bin Saad	8 June 1969 – 1971	Abdulaziz, Saud, Faisal
Khalid Al-Faisal	1971 – 2007	Faisal, Khalid, Fahd, Abdullah
Faisal bin Khalid	2007 – 2018	Faisal, Khalid, Fahd, Abdullah
Turki bin Talal	2018 – present	Salman

== See also ==
- Provinces of Saudi Arabia
- List of governorates of Saudi Arabia
- List of cities and towns in Saudi Arabia
- Asir Mountains
- Al Soudah
- Soudah Peaks
- Al-Qatt Al-Asiri
- Hejaz
- Sarawat Mountains
- South Arabia
- Tihamah
