= List of mountains in Saudi Arabia =

This is an (incomplete) list of mountains in Saudi Arabia.

== Peaks over 3,000 m ==
Peak	Height (m)	Mountain range	Region	Nearest City	Coordinates
Jabal Ferwa	3,004	As-Sarawat	Asir	Al-Harjah	17°55′42″N 43°15′56″E
Jabal Al-Sawda	3,015	As-Sarawat	Asir	Abha	18.2678° N, 42.3703° E

== Peaks over 2,500 m ==
Peak	Height (m)	Mountain range	Region	Nearest City	Coordinates
Jabal Natfa' (Arabic: جبل نطفاء)	2,965 *	As-Sarawat	Asir	Al-Harjah	17°55′04″N 43°17′27″E
Jabal Warrab (Arabic: جبل وراب)	2,948 *	As-Sarawat	Asir	Al-Harjah	17°58′42″N 43°14′14″E
Jabal Al-Majaz (Arabic: جبل المجاز)	2,902	As-Sarawat	Asir	Sarat Obaidah	18°00′23″N 43°13′22″E
Jebal As-Seqaa (Arabic: جبال السقى)	2,863 *	As-Sarawat	Asir	Abha	18°13′05″N 42°23′51″E
Jabal Moushref (Arabic: جبل مشرف)	2,859	As-Sarawat	Asir	Al-Harjah	17°54′40″N 43°18′20″E
Jabal Khalaqah (Arabic: جبل خلقه)	2,850 *	As-Sarawat	Asir	Ballasmer	18°46′57″N 42°13′41″E
Jabal Nahran (Arabic: جبل نهران)	2,837 *	As-Sarawat	Asir	Abha	18°10′30″N 42°28′0″E
Jabal As-Sahla' (Arabic: جبل الصهلاء)	2,837	As-Sarawat	Asir	Ballasmer	18°42′0″N 42°13′50″E
Sh'af Bayhan (Arabic: شعف بيحان)	2,788 *	As-Sarawat	Asir	Ballahmer	18°38′45″N 42°13′43″E
Jabal Mana' (Arabic: جبل منعاء)	2,782	As-Sarawat	Asir	Tanomah	18°58′38″N 42°11′15″E
Jabal Shaokan (Arabic: جبل شوكان)	2,786 *	As-Sarawat	Asir	Rejal Alma'a	18°15′16″N 42°20′51″E
Jabal Ad-Dhoor (Arabic: جبل الضور)	2,755 *	As-Sarawat	Asir	Sarat Obaidah	18°10′51″N 43°10′33″E
Jabal Rathba' (Arabic: جبل رثباء)	2,744 *	As-Sarawat	Asir	Abha	18°21′07″N 42°18′37″E
Jabal Al-'Amood (Arabic: جبل العمود)	2,742 *	As-Sarawat	Asir	Sarat Obaidah	18°09′32″N 43°10′19″E
Jebal Al-A'minah (Arabic: جبال الأعمنة)	2,740 *	As-Sarawat	Asir	Dhahran Al-Janoob	17°45′26″N 43°25′12″E
Jabal Watarah (Arabic: جبل وتره)	2,725 *	As-Sarawat	Asir	Ballasmer	18°48′55″N 42°15′01″E
Jabal Mareer (Arabic: جبل مرير)	2,712 *	As-Sarawat	Asir	An-Namas	19°11′30″N 42°04′04″E
Jabal Al-Qo'mah (Arabic: جبل القعمة)	2,707	As-Sarawat	Asir	Al-Harjah	17°51′50″N 43°25′25″E
Al-Hadab (Arabic: الحدب)	2,647 *	As-Sarawat	Makkah Region	Hadab Balhareth	20°46′45″N 40°47′54″E
Jabal Masher (Arabic: جبل مسحر)	2,640 *	As-Sarawat	Asir	Sarat Obaidah	18°12′32″N 43°12′33″E
Jabal Maomah (Arabic: جبل مومة)	2,639	As-Sarawat	Asir	Tanomah	19°0′25″N 42°5′55″E
Jabal E'theb (Arabic: جبل اعذب)	2,632 *	As-Sarawat	Makkah Region	Maysan Balhareth	20°42′58″N 40°50′54″E
Jabal Al-Oraif (Arabic: جبل العريف)	2,632	As-Sarawat	Jizan Region	Faifa	17°19′21″N 43°19′37″E
Jabal Al-Adeem / Sha'ar (Arabic: جبل الأديم - شعار)	2,627	As-Sarawat	Makkah Region	At-Taif	21°08′30″N 40°12′21″E
Jabal Lanbash (Arabic: جبل لنبش)	2,623 *	As-Sarawat	Asir	Tanomah	19°01′12″N 42°08′19″E
Jabal Ketfa' (Arabic: جبل كتفاء)	2,623	As-Sarawat	Asir	Al-Jwah	17°53′0″N 43°13′33″E
Jabal Thahran (Arabic: جبل ثهران)	2,621	As-Sarawat	Jizan Region	Ad-Dayer	17°26′26″N 43°12′47″E
Jabal Batharah (Arabic: جبل بثرة)	2,604	As-Sarawat	Makkah Region	Haddad Bani Malek	20°24′35″N 41°08′31″E
Jabal Al-Jorrah (Arabic: جبل الجره)	2,596 *	As-Sarawat	Asir	Tamniah	18°00′40″N 42°45′04″E
Jabal 'Ayaar (Arabic: جبل عيار)	2,595 *	As-Sarawat	Asir	Hawra'	18°51′23″N 42°18′42″E
Sahn Tamniah (Arabic: صحن تمنية)	2,593 *	As-Sarawat	Asir	Tamniah	18°01′32″N 42°47′53″E
Jabal Saaq (Arabic: جبل ساق)	2,592	As-Sarawat	Makkah Region	At-Taif	21°08′00″N 40°14′14″E
Jabal Fadmah (Arabic: جبل فدمة)	2,585 *	As-Sarawat	Makkah Region	At-Taif	21°06′41″N 40°14′46″E
Jabal Shythath (Arabic: جبل شثاث)	2,584	As-Sarawat	Asir	Dhahran Al-Janoob	17°41′35″N 43°30′26″E
Jabal Al-Khayyalah (Arabic: جبل الخيالة)	2,582 *	As-Sarawat	Makkah Region	Maysan Balhareth	20°49′18″N 40°46′54″E
Jabal Al-Jabha'a (Arabic: جبل الجبهاء)	2,581 *	As-Sarawat	Asir	Rejal Alma'a	18°09′02″N 42°25′10″E
Jabal Dhalam (Arabic: جبل ظلم)	2,575	As-Sarawat	Asir	Sarat Obaidah	18°4′11″N 43°7′34″E
Jabal Lawa's (Arabic: جبل لوعس)	2,558 *	As-Sarawat	Al-Bahah Region	Al-Bahah	20°02′32″N 41°24′44″E
Jabal Daka (Arabic: جبل دكا)	2,557 *	As-Sarawat	Makkah Region	At-Taif	21°05′37″N 40°17′32″E
Sh'af A'l Nassir (Arabic: شعف آل ناصر)	2,556 *	As-Sarawat	Asir	An-Namas	19°10′19″N 42°05′48″E
Jabal 'Okran (Arabic: جبل عكران)	2,551 *	As-Sarawat	Asir	Tanomah	18°57′05″N 42°08′49″E
Jabal Al-Lawz (Arabic: جبل اللوز)	2,549	Madiyan	Tabuk Region	Tabuk	28°39′16″N 35°18′18″E
Jabal Al-Ahmar (Arabic: جبل الأحمر)	2,536 *	As-Sarawat	Al-Bahah Region	Al-Bahah	20°03′10″N 41°24′39″E
Jabal Al-A'blah (Arabic: جبل العبلة)	2,536 *	As-Sarawat	Makkah Region	Thaqeef	20°40′57″N 40°51′39″E
Jebal Al-Juhayyir (Arabic: جبال الجهير)	2,522 *	As-Sarawat	Al-Bahah Region	Al-Bahah	20°01′45″N 41°25′31″E
Jabal Ad-Dhoor (Arabic: جبل الظور)	2,521	As-Sarawat	Asir	Bani 'Amr	19°25′20″N 42°3′25″E
Jabal Al-A'rdhah (Arabic: جبل العرضة)	2,513 *	As-Sarawat	Al-Bahah Region	Al-Bahah	20°02′52″N 41°25′35″E
Qarn Al-Khabet (Arabic: قرن الخبت)	2,513	As-Sarawat	Asir	Sarat Obaidah	18°2′15″N 43°21′51″E
Jabal Al-'qab (Arabic: جبل العقب)	2,512 *	As-Sarawat	Makkah Region	Bani Sa'd	20°52′32″N 40°44′37″E
Jabal Abo Swayd (Arabic: جبل ابي سويد)	2,502 *	As-Sarawat	Al-Bahah Region	Al-Bahah	20°02′24″N 41°24′19″E

== Highest peaks in the Hijaz Mountains ==
Peak	Height (m)	Mountain range	Region	Nearest City	Coordinates
Jabal Werqaan (Arabic: جبل ورقان)	2,393	Al-Hejaz	Al Madinah Region	Al-Musayjid	23°58′38″N 39°16′43″E
Jabal Radhwa (Arabic: جبال رضوى)	2,282	Al-Hejaz	Al Madinah Region	Yanbu	24°34′30″N 38°16′00″E
Jabal Idqis (Arabic: جبل ادقس)	2,161	Al-Hejaz	Al Madinah Region	Al-Yotmah	23°34′30″N 39°29′39″E
Jabal Al-Ward (Arabic: جبل الورد)	2,096	Al-Hejaz	Al Madinah Region	Al-'Ola	26°25′00″N 37°13′00″E
Jebal Awf (Arabic: جبال عوف)	2,082	Al-Hejaz	Al Madinah Region	Al-Yotmah	23°39′00″N 39°22′00″E
Jebal Al-Feqrah (Arabic: جبال الفقرة)	1,979 *	Al-Hejaz	Al Madinah Region	Al-Madinah	24°19′40″N 38°56′20″E
Jebal Sabah (Arabic: جبال صبح)	1,898	Al-Hejaz	Al Madinah Region	Badr	23°38′04″N 39°07′12″E
Jebal Al-Hadhbah (Arabic: جبال الهضبة)	1,804	Al-Hejaz	Al Madinah Region	Rabigh	23°13′57″N 39°38′16″E
Jabal Shamansir (Arabic: جبل شمنصير)	1,618	Al-Hejaz	Makkah Region	Al-Kamel	22°16′40″N 39°58′25″E

== Highest peaks in the Midian Mountains ==
Peak	Height (m)	Mountain range	Region	Nearest City	Coordinates
Jabal Al-Lawz (Arabic: جبل اللوز)	2,549	Madiyan Mountains	Tabuk Region	Tabuk	28°39′16″N 35°18′18″E
Jabal Al-Qalom (Arabic: جبل القلوم)	2,367 *	Madiyan Mountains	Tabuk Region	Tabuk	28°35′45″N 35°20′03″E
Jabal Maqla (Arabic: جبل مقلة)	2,326 *	Madiyan Mountains	Tabuk Region	Tabuk	28.59674°N 35.33549°E
Jebal Ad-Dubbagh (Arabic: جبال الدبغ)	2,315	Madiyan Mountains	Tabuk Region	Dhuba	27°51′38″N 35°44′22″E
Jabal Al-Juhayyir (Arabic: جبل الجهير)	2,118 *	Madiyan Mountains	Tabuk Region	Ad-Disah	27°38′38″N 36°43′06″E
Jabal Ash-Shyati (Arabic: جبل الشياطي)	2,103	Madiyan Mountains	Tabuk Region	Shrma	28°11′51″N 35°35′50″E
Jabal Watad (Arabic: جبل وتد)	2,023	Madiyan Mountains	Tabuk Region	Bad'a	27°08′50″N 36°46′56″E
Jabal Zuhd (Arabic: جبل زهد)	1,980	Madiyan Mountains	Tabuk Region	Shrma	28°18′59″N 35°17′41″E
Jabal Harb (Arabic: جبل حرب)	1,962 *	Madiyan Mountains	Tabuk Region	Dhuba	27°57′39″N 35°39′27″E
Jabal Thagheb (Arabic: جبل ثغب)	1,889	Madiyan Mountains	Tabuk Region	Maqna'	28°50′35″N 34°57′57″E
Jabal Huwad (Arabic: جبل حوض)	1,832	Madiyan Mountains	Tabuk Region	Tabuk	28°28′15″N 35°34′27″E
Jebal Ad-dhahr (Arabic: جبال الظهر)	1,828 *	Madiyan Mountains	Tabuk Region	Haql	29°10′36″N 35°27′17″E
Jabal Shar (Arabic: جبل شار)	1,784	Madiyan Mountains	Tabuk Region	Dhuba	27°38′52″N 35°44′32″E
Jabal an Nukhaylah (Arabic: جبل نخيلة)		Madiyan Mountains	Tabuk Region	Dhuba	28°39′15″N 35°18′21″E
Jabal `Umayyid (Arabic: جبل عميد)		Madiyan Mountains	Tabuk Region	Dhuba	28°39′15″N 35°18′21″E
Jabal Umm Hayfā'		Madiyan Mountains	Tabuk Region	Dhuba	28°39′15″N 35°18′21″E

== Highest peaks in the Tihamah ==
Peak	Height (m)	Mountain range	Region	Nearest City	Coordinates

== See also ==
- Asir Mountains
- Geography of Saudi Arabia
- Geology of Saudi Arabia
- Rakuba
- Al-Dukhul and Hummel Mountains
- Jildiyyah Mountain
- List of volcanoes in Saudi Arabia
- Shammar Mountains
- Ubla mountains
- Jabal Ikmah

== Notes ==
- (*) These measurements are not exact. The shown heights are taken by Google Earth.
