= Jabal Mareer =

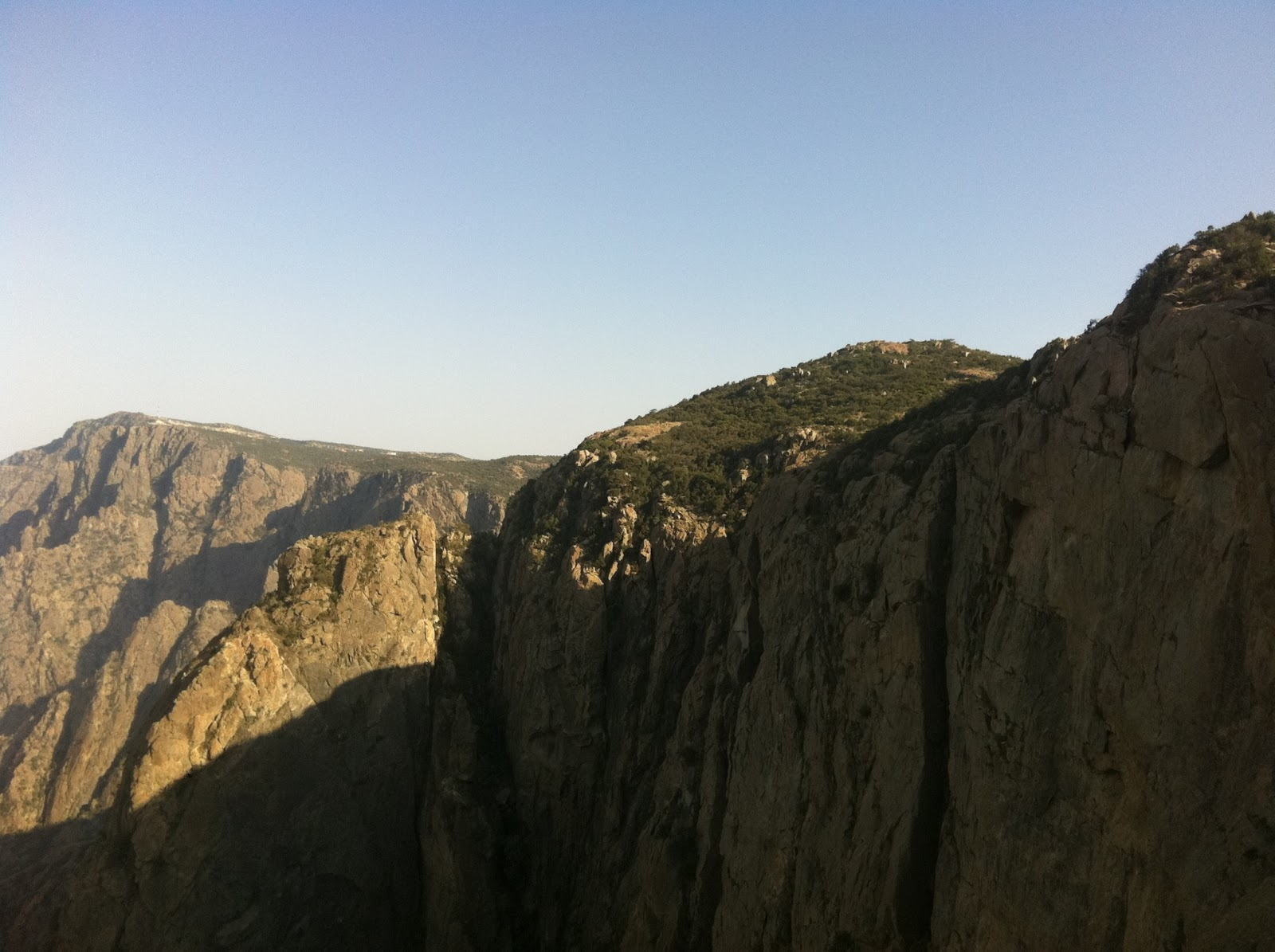
Jabal Mareer

Jabal Mareer (Arabic: جبل مرير) is a mountain of the Sarwat Mountains in the Arabian Peninsula and is located in the village of Al Qahtan about 15 kilometers north of Al-Namas in the Asir region.

It is the highest peak in the so-called "Bitter Mountains," named because of their difficult ascent. The peak offers views of the Red Sea to the west and the oases of Bisha to the east on a clear day.

Jabal Mareer has been declared a national park due to pristine forests of juniper and an animal population that includes Arabian leopards, hyenas, wolves, and the Nubian ibex.

== See also ==
- List of mountains in Saudi Arabia
