= Sh'af A'l Nassir =

Mountain in Saudi Arabia

Location of Saudi Arabia

Sh'af A'l Nassir (Arabic: شعف آل ناصر) is a mountain in Saudi Arabia.

The mountain is located in Sarawat, Tanomah, 'Asir Region at 19°10′19″N, 42°05′48″E. The mountain peak is 2,556 metres (8,386 ft) above sea level.

== See also ==
- List of mountains in Saudi Arabia
