= Wareqan Mountain =

Mountain in Medina in Saudi Arabia

- Madinah Region Saudi Arabia

Highest point
- Elevation: 2,400 m (7,900 ft)
- Coordinates: 23°58′35.27″N 39°16′55.67″E

Geography
- Location: Saudi Arabia

Wareqan Mountain is one of the Medina region mountains, it is located southwest of Medina, seventy kilometers away on the Al-Hijra highway, and is 2400 meters above sea level and is also known as the Ouf Mountains after the tribe of Bani Ouf from Harb Tribe. Wareqan Mountain was mentioned in the Islamic narrative by Muhammad when he said, "The infidel's tooth on the Day of Judgment is like Uhud, the width of his skin is seventy cubits, his neck is like Al-Bayda, his thigh is like Wareqan, and his seat in the Hellfire is like what between me and Al-Rabadha."

Nearby are many villages, including Shalayel, Habt, Hadah, Reem, Al-Halaqa, Al-Jalas, Ash Shufayyah, Al-Balaniyah, Yadah, Al-Qahah, and Al-Watiyah.

== Historical and geographical references ==
=== Al-Bakri ===
Al-Bakri of Andalusia said: "it is one of the mountains of Tihama. If you come up from Makkah, the first mountain you meet is Wareqan, a large mountain. It goes from Sayyala to Al-Mu'tashi, between Al-Arj and Al-Ruwaitha. It has water springs. Its inhabitants are Banu Aws from Muzainah, known to be honest people."

It includes types of fruitful and non-fruitful trees. It contains sumac, qard, pomegranate, and khazm, which is a tree whose leaves resemble papyrus, and has a stem like the stem of a palm tree, and the people of the Hejaz call it Al-Damakh, and the people of the Gond call it Al-Artin. To the right of Wareqan are Sayyala, Al-Ruha and Al-Ruwaitha, and Al-Arj is to his left, and Qedes connects to Wareqan .

On the authority of Abu al-Haytham, on the authority of Abu Sa`id al-Khudri, he said: Muhammad said: "The seat of the infidel from Hell is a distance of three days’ distance, his molar is like Uhud, and his thigh is like Wareqan."

=== Al-Zamakhshari ===
Al-Zamakhshari said: "Wareqan is a known mountain."

=== Al-Iskandri ===
Al-Iskandri said: "Wareqan is a black Mountain, the first mountain you will encounter while leaving Medina ascending from Mesaad, leading from Sayyala to Al-Mu'tashi between Al-Arj and Al-Ruwaitha, pushing its stream to Reem."

=== Alhazmi al-Hamdani ===
Alhazmi al-Hamdani said: "Wareqan is a black mountain between Al-Arj and Al-Ruwaitha, to the right of who ascend from Medina to Mecca, which pours its water to Reem."

Abu al-Ash'ath al-Kindi said in his book Names of the Mountains of Tihamah: "For those who come from the city ascending, the first mountain he meets on his left is Wareqan, It is a large black mountain, leading from Sayyala to Al-Mu'tashi which also called Al-gyi, between Al-Arj and Al-Ruwaitha. In Wareqan, there are all kinds of fruitful trees except dates, including qarad, sumac, pomegranate, and khazm. It has also sweet water springs."

=== Yaqut al-Hamawi ===
Yaqut al-Hamawi said: "The correct version is in the hadith of Abu Hurayra, The best mountains are Uhud, Al-Ash'ar and Wareqan. It is a black mountain between Al-Arj and Al-Ruwaitha, to the right of who ascend from Medina to Mecca, it's water streams to Rathm."

Aram ibn al-Asbag mentioned in the names of the mountains of Tihamah: The first mountain he meets on his left is Wareqan, which is a large black mountain, which starts from its stream to Al-Mu'tashi which also called Al-gyi, between Al-Arj and Al-Ruwaitha. I has all kinds of fruitful trees including qarad, sumac, pomegranate, and khazm. It has also sweet water springs.

Khazam is s a tree whose leaves resemble papyrus, and has a stem like the stem of a palm tree. The inhabitants of Wareqan are the Banu Aws bin Mazinah, the people of Amud.

=== Abdulmumin al-Baghdadi ===
Abdulmumin al-Baghdadi said: "Wareqan is a black mountain between Al-Arj and Al-Ruwaitha, to the right of who ascend from Medina to Mecca, it's water streams to Rathm. And it's one of Tihamah's Mountains."

=== Al-Samhudi ===
Al-Samhudi said: "Wareqan is a black mountain between Al-Arj and Al-Ruwaitha, to the right of who ascend from Medina to Mecca, goes from Sayyala to Al-gyi. At the foothill of it to the right is Sayyala, then Al-Ruha, then Al-Ruwaitha, then Al-gyi. In Wareqan there different types of fruitful and non-fruitful trees. It contains sumac, and qard, It also has water springs. The inhabitants of Wareqan are the Banu Aws bin Mazinah, the people of Amud. Asadi said: It is to the left of the road when you come out of Sayyala, and it's connects to Mecca. Araam mentioned that it is the mountain that is next to Al-gyi Al-Qudsan and is separated from it by Okbat-rukuba. Mentioned also in Al-Tabarani's hadith that Wareqan is one of the mountains of paradise according to him. And in the hadith of Muhammad when he said that "The best mountains are Uhud, Al-Ash'ar, and Wareqan" and that it is one of the mountains that fell in Medina as one of the mountains to which Allah manifested himself to him according to Muhammad. In tradition, it is one of the mountains from which the Kaaba was built. Also in the Islamic narrative in the hadith of Muhammad he said: "Do you know what the name of this mountain?" meaning Wareqan "This is Hamat, a mountain from paradise, may Allah bless it and bless its people". Then he said, "This is Sajasaj al-Ruha'a, this is a valley of paradise."

=== Al-Baladi Al-Harbi ===
Al-Baladi Al-Harbi said: "It is a grizzled mountain, not a black one, as reported in the books of the ancients. It is a mountain with spikes that is difficult to climb, if you come to Al-Ruha from Medina, Wareqan will be on your left you will see it towering. The people sing of its difficult and impenetrable terrain. It is today for Awaf from a Harb tribe. It's waters divided between Ghor and Jalas al-ghor in Al-Safra valley and Al-Jalas in Al-Furaish valley, then Malal and Idam. Wareqan is 70 kilometers south of the city."

== See also ==
- List of mountains in Saudi Arabia
- Rakuba
