= Abdullah Abu Dahesh =

Saudi researcher and historian

- Born: 1950 (age 75–76); Tanomah- Abha
- Education: Imam Muhammad Ibn Saud Islamic University
- Honours: King Salman prize and scholarship for the History of the Arabian Peninsula

Abdullah Abu Dahesh (Arabic:عبدالله أبوداهش) is a Saudi historian and researcher, born in Tanomah Bani Shehr in Asir province in 1950. He has a strong interest in the historical literature of the southern region of Saudi Arabia He founded the magazine Habaasha, a scientific yearbook focused on studies of the history and literature of the Arabian Peninsula and its intellectual heritage.

== Education ==
In 1984, he received a doctoral degree with first class honors from Imam Muhammad Ibn Saud Islamic University Faculty of Arabic Language, with his thesis titled, The Impact of Sheikh Muhammad ibn Abd al-Wahhab's Call on Thought and Literature in Southern Arabic Peninsula.

== Career ==
He served as a professor of literature at King Khalid University in Abha.

He established Habaasha magazine, an annual scientific publication focused on research in the literature, history, and intellectual heritage of the Arabian Peninsula. Its first issue was published in 2011.

Additionally, he founded the Dr. Abdullah Abu Dahish House for Scientific Research and Publishing, along with the Dr. Abdullah Abu Dahish Prize for Scientific Research.

== Works ==
=== Author ===
- (Athar Dawa Alshiekh Mohammad bin Abd Alwahaab fi Alfikir wa Al-Adab bi Janoobay Ajazeerah AlArabia) part one. Issued in King Abdul-Aziz house in 1999
- (Ahl AlSuraat Fi AlQuroon Al-Eslamia Al-Waseeta)
- (Buyootat Al-Elm Wa Tullabah Biqabaahil Rijaal Alhajar fi Baadh Alwathaek wa Almakhtootaat Al-mahallia )
- (Alharakah Alelmiyah wa Aladabia bi Mantikat Asir fi Ahd Almalik Abdul-Aziz)
- (Alhayaah Alfikriya wa Aladabiya fi Janoob Albilaad Alsaudiya)
- (Hayaah fi Hayaah)
- (Al-Rajaz fi Alsaheehayn)
- (Shuwaraa Hawla Al-Rasool Salla Allah Alayh Wa Sallam)
- ( Al-Sher Fi Saheeh Al-Bukhaari Wa Muslim)
- (Min Bawakeer Al-Sher Alsiyaasi Al-Hadeeth fi Jazeerat Al-Arab)
- (Nahwa Manhaj Adabi Islami)

=== Researcher ===
- (Alqaseedataan Aldhaleetan Almansoobatan Ela Al-Ameer Al-Sanaani)
- (Allijam Almakeen Wa Al-Zimam Al-Mateen) By Muhammad bin Ahmad Al-Hafizi
- (Al-Mafqood min Sher Ali bin Muhammad Al-Sinwisi) collection and investigation
- (Naseehat Al-Hafizi) Ahmed bin Abdul-Qadir Al-Hafizi.
- (Baeeyat Al-Thurwe fi Mizan Al-Nakd).

== Awards ==
He won King Salman prize and scholarship for the History of the Arabian Peninsula for Pioneers in the History of the Arabian Peninsula in 2005.
