= Jabal Ad-Dhoor =

Mountain in Saudi Arabia

Jabal Ad-Dhoor (Arabic: جبل الضور) is a mountain of Saudi Arabia located at 18°10′51″N 43°10′33″E.

Jabal al-Dour is part of the Sarawat Mountains located in the south of Saudi Arabia and is located in the north of the province of al-Namas belonging to the Asir region.

It rises by 2,521 meters (8,271 feet) above sea level.

== See also ==
- List of mountains in Saudi Arabia
