= Jabal Khalaqah =

Jabal Khalaqah (جبل خلقه) is a mountain of the Sarwat Mountains and one of the highest mountains of Saudi Arabia.

It is located at 18°46′57″N 42°13′41″E in Billasmar, 'Asir Region. And at a height of 2,850 m (9,350 ft), it is the eighth tallest peak in Saudi Arabia.

Jabal Khalaqah means Mount Creation or His Creation in Arabic.

== See also ==
- List of mountains in Saudi Arabia
