= Jabal Warrab =

Saudi Arabian Mountain

Coordinates: 17°58′43″N 43°14′15″E

Jebal Warrab (جبل وراب) is a mountain of Saudi Arabia.

At 2,948 m (9,672 ft), it is the 4th highest mountain of Saudi Arabia.

Its name means Mount Rap, and it is in the Sarwat Mountains in the Asir region of Saudi Arabia.

== See also ==
- List of mountains in Saudi Arabia
