= Jebal As-Seqaa =

Mountain in Saudi Arabia

Jebal As-Seqaa (Arabic: جبال السقى) is a mountain at 18°13′05″N 42°23′51″E in the Sarwat Mountains of Saudi Arabia, in the region of Asir Belkrb near the city of Abha . At a height of 2863 m (9393 ft) it is the sixth highest mountain in Saudi Arabia.

Jebal As-Seqaa means mount of Watering.

== See also ==
- List of mountains in Saudi Arabia
