= Jabal As-Sahla' =

Saudi Arabian geological feature

Location of Saudi Arabia

Jabal As-Sahla' (Arabic: جبل الصهلاء, also known as جبل نهران), is a mountain in Saudi Arabia.

The mountain is located in the Sarawat Ranges, 'Asir Region at 18°42′0″N, 42°13′50″E. The mountain peak is 2,556 meters above sea level.

== See also ==
- List of mountains in Saudi Arabia
