= Abidah (tribe) =

Yemeni tribe

The Abidah (Arabic: قبيلة عَبِيدة) are an Arab tribe located in eastern Yemen and southern Saudi Arabia in of Sarat Ubaidah and Riyadh and Eastern region

== History and origins ==
The Abidah are the descendants of Ma'awyah bin Amr bin Mawyah bin al-Harth bin Yazid bin Harb bin Ka'ab bin Alaah bin Jalad bin Madhhaj bin Azd bin Zaid bin Yashjub bin Arib bin Zaid bin Kahlan bin Saba. After the final collapse of the Marib Dam, a large member of Al-Azd tribes' members emigrated and spread across the Arabian Peninsula, most of them what is now Saudi Arabia, United Arab Emirates, Oman and Kuwait. The Abidah tribe are known as Abidah Abrad to distinguish it from Qahtani Abidah Sarat that reside in Sarat Ubaida in Asir, southwestern Saudi Arabia.

== Location ==
The Abidah tribe lies in the Governorate of Marib. It is one of the biggest and most prominent tribes in Marib and eastern Yemen. Its territory covers the entire eastern half of the governorate and encompasses most of the Marib's oil and gas fields.

== See also ==
- Murad
