= Sh'af Bayhan =

Location of Saudi Arabia

Sh'af Bayhan (Arabic: شعف بيحان) is a mountain in Saudi Arabia.

The mountain is located in Sarawat Ranges, 'Asir Region at 18°38′45″N 42°13′43″. The mountain peak is 2,788 m above sea level.

== See also ==
- List of mountains in Saudi Arabia
