= Jabal Natfa' =

Mountain in Saudi Arabia

- Location within Saudi Arabia

Highest point
- Elevation: 2,965 m (9,728 ft)
- Coordinates: 17°55′04″N 43°17′27″E

Geography
- Location: Saudi Arabia
- Parent range: Sarawat Mountains

Jabal Natfa' is a mountain in Saudi Arabia located in the Sarawat mountain range. At 2,965 m (9,728 ft) above sea level, it is the third highest peak in Saudi Arabia. It is west of Al Harajah, Saudi Arabia.

== See also ==
- List of mountains in Saudi Arabia
