= Jabal 'Okran =

Mountain in Saudi Arabia

Saudi Arabia map

Jabal 'Okran (Arabic: جبل عكران) is a mountain of Saudi Arabia located in As-Sarawat 'Asir Region at 18°57′05″N 42°08′49″E.

The mountain height is 2,551 meters above sea level.

== See also ==
- List of mountains in Saudi Arabia
