= Jabal Moushref =

Mountain in Saudi Arabia

Mount Musharraf is a mountain of the Sarwat Mountains range in Saudi Arabia, and at 2,859 m in height one of the highest mountains of Saudi Arabia. It is located in the Asir region at 17°54′40″N and 43°18′20″E near the town of Al-Harjah.

== See also ==
- List of mountains in Saudi Arabia
