= Jabal Nahran =

Mountain in Saudi Arabia

Jabal Nahran is a mountain of the Sarwat Mountain Range in the region of Asir Belkrb, Saudi Arabia. It is near the city of Abha and at a height of 2,837 metres (9,308 ft) it is the ninth-highest peak in the Saudi kingdom.

== See also ==
- List of mountains in Saudi Arabia
