= Jabal Maomah =

Mountain in the Sarawat Mountains, Saudi Arabia

Highest point
- Elevation: 2,639 m (8,658 ft)
- Coordinates: 19°00′25″N 42°05′55″E

Naming
- Native name: جبل مومة

Geography
- Location: Tanomah, Aseer Province, Saudi Arabia
- Parent range: Sarawat Mountains

Jabal Maomah (Arabic: جبل مومة) is a mountain in the Sarawat Mountains range, located in the Tanomah Governorate of Aseer Province, Saudi Arabia. It has an elevation of 2,639 metres (8,658 ft).

== See also ==
- Provinces of Saudi Arabia
- List of mountains in Saudi Arabia
- List of governorates of Saudi Arabia
- List of cities and towns in Saudi Arabia
