= Jabal Lawa's =

Mountain in Saudi Arabia

Coordinates: 20°02′30″N 41°24′45″E

Location of Saudi Arabia

Jabal Lawa's (Arabic: جبل لوعس), also known as Mount Loess, is a mountain in Saudi Arabia. It is 2,558 m (8,392 ft) high, and is located in a sub-range of the Sarawat mountain range, near the city of Al Bahah in the Al Bahah Region.

== See also ==
- List of mountains in Saudi Arabia
