= Jabal Al-Majaz =

- Location within Yemen

Highest point
- Elevation: 2,902 m (9,521 ft)
- Prominence: 2,902 m (9,521 ft)
- Listing: Country high point Ultra
- Coordinates: 18°00′23″N 43°13′22″E

Naming
- Native name: جَبَل ٱلْمَجَاز (Arabic)

Geography
- Location: 'Asir Region Saudi Arabia

Jabal Al-Majāz (Arabic: جَبَل ٱلْمَجَاز, romanized: Jabal Al-Majāz, "Mount Metaphor") is a mountain in the Sarawat range, 'Asir Region of Saudi Arabia, near the Yemeni border. At 2,902 m (9,521 ft) in height, it is one of the tallest mountains in the Saudi Kingdom.

== See also ==
- List of mountains in Saudi Arabia
- Asir Mountains
