= Jabal Al-Qalom =

Mountain in Tabuk Region Saudi Arabia

Coordinates: 28°35′45″N 35°20′03″E

Jabal Al-Qalom (جبل القلوم ) is a mountain in Tabuk Region Saudi Arabia. It is 2,398 metres (7,867 ft) high, and is in the Madiyan Mountains near Tabuk.

== See also ==
- List of mountains in Saudi Arabia
