= Jabal Umm Hayfā' =

- Location within Saudi Arabia

Highest point
- Coordinates: 28°39′15″N 35°18′21″E

Geography
- Location: Saudi Arabia

Climbing
- First ascent: Prehistory

Jabal Umm Hayfā' is a mountain located in the Madiyan Mountains of northwest Saudi Arabia, near the Jordan border, above the Gulf of Aqaba, and is located in Tabūk, Saudi Arabia. It is one of the tallest mountains in the Arabian Peninsula.

== See also ==
- List of mountains in Saudi Arabia
