= Jebal Ad-dhahr =

Jebal Ad-dhahr (Arabic: جبال الظهر) is a mountain of the Madiyan Mountains in Tabuk Region of Saudi Arabia. It is located near the town of Haql at 29°10′36″N 35°27′17″E. It has a height of 1,828 m (5,997 ft).

== See also ==
- List of mountains in Saudi Arabia
