= Al-Hadab =

Mountain in Saudi Arabia

- Location within Saudi Arabia

Highest point
- Elevation: 2,647 m (8,684 ft)
- Coordinates: 20°46′45″N 40°47′54″E

Geography
- Country: Saudi Arabia

Al-Hadab (Arabic: الحدب) is a mountain in Saudi Arabia it is located at 20°46′45″N 40°47′54″E and is 2647m or 8684 feet in height above sea level.

== See also ==
- List of mountains in Saudi Arabia
