= Al Qahtan =

Al Qahtan is a village in Saudi Arabia, located in the northern part of Al-Namas governorate. It is about 13 kilometers from Namas, and the village of the Zaid valley occupies one of the highest residential points in the Saudi Kingdom.

Because of its altitude the town has cold winters, mild summers with thick fog and rain in most seasons. Winter temperatures range from −5 °C to 9 °C and in summer do not exceed 18 to 27 °C.

Al Qahtan village suffered from population migration to cities like other villages around Namas and Asir. The population generally ranges between 4,000 and 5,500 people divided into 9 clans.

== See also ==
- List of cities and towns in Saudi Arabia
- Regions of Saudi Arabia
