= Banu Shahr =

Bani Shahr بني شهر
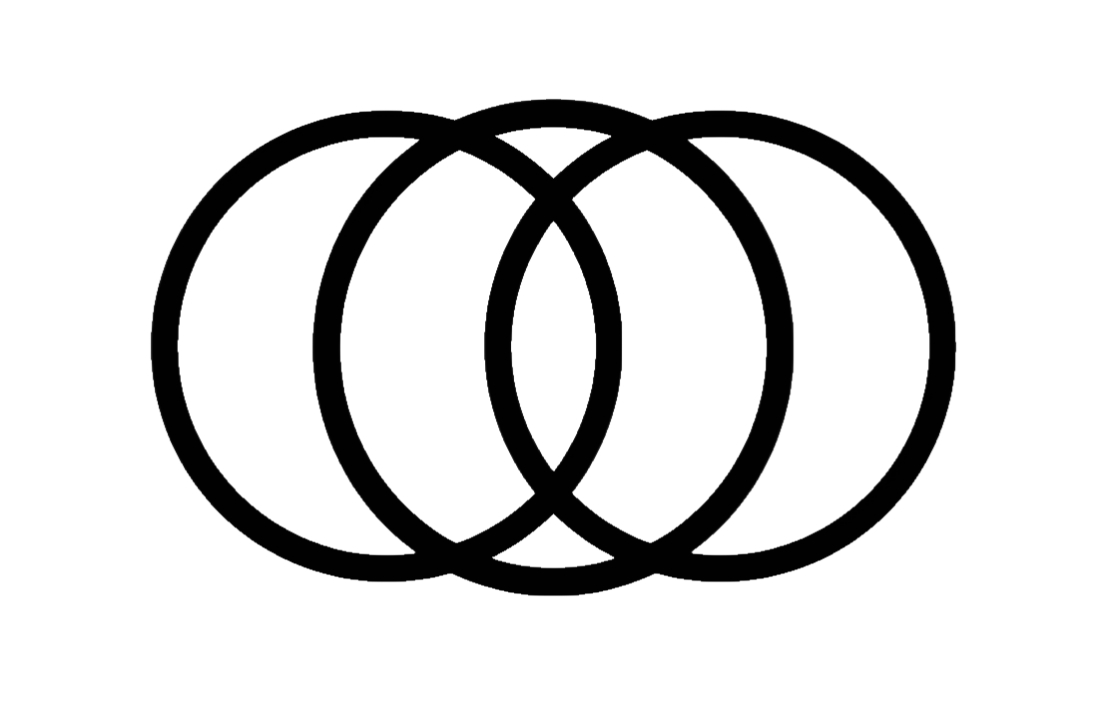
- The flag of the Banu Shahr tribe (which consists of three intersecting circles) during the reign of the Al Yazid Emirate.
- Ethnicity: Arabs
- Location: Saudi Arabia
- Parent tribe: Azd
- Language: Arabic
- Religion: Islam

The Banu Shahr (Arabic: بني شهر) is a tribe from the southern part of the Saudi Arabia. It belongs to the ancient tribe al-Azd that has many clans linked to it. As far as ancestry goes, Banu Shahr, Bani Amr, Bal-Ahmar, Bal-Asmar, Bal-Qarn, Shumran, and some others all belong to "al-Azd".

Al-Namas, Tanumah, Almajarda, and some parts of Tuhama are the locations of Banu Shahr.

== Ancestors ==
Banu Shahr tribes are branching from Al-Azd Tribe, and they are affiliated to their top grandfather (Shehr Ibn Al-Hijr Ibn Al-Hinu Ibn Al-Azd Ibn Al-Ghawth Ibn Nabt Ibn Malik bin Zayd Ibn Kahlan Ibn Saba'a (Sheba) Ibn Yashjub Ibn Yarab Ibn Qahtan Ibn Hud (prophet) (Eber).)

Al-Azd tribes are branching from the Arabs forefather Qahtan.

Ibn Kathir has mentioned Al-Azd in his book (Al Bidayah wa-Nihayah) "The Beginning and the End" and said that they had reached the summit of glory, and honor its peak, and the history has maintained and noted their glory, they are the owners of two paradises, 1st paradise: they owned the Kingdom of Saba'a Sheba before Islam, and the 2nd paradise: they're the masters of the Arabs and kings after their migration from Yemen and dispersed throughout the Arabian Peninsula. After the Islamic prophet Muhammad's mission was to them in Islam and the status of a great gesture honest, as are the first Arab tribes believe in Muhammad, and endorsement of his letter, and they help him with their money and themselves. They are the owners of the Islamic conquests in honorable positions in raising the banner of monotheism and the spread of Islam in the corners of the earth, and many of them were/are scholars and poets who influenced in the Arab and Islamic culture.

== Brief of Bani Shehr battles against The Ottoman Empire ==
In the year 1792/هـ1207 the Prince Gurm bin Saeed al-Asbali al-Shehri, Also known as the Sheikh of Banu Shehr sent his men to fight Ottoman troops in the city of Al-Baha, and repulsed the attack of the Ottomans against Ghamid and Zahran, they said many were killed from the tribe of (Asir) 800 men in that battle. On Sunday, 18/6/1224 H Prince Mohammed Bin Dahman al-Shehri with his tribe the tribe of Bani Shehr attended and appeared in the army of (50) thousand fighters, and made the valley near the (Beech) to fight the Abu Sharif Hammoud, governor of nail Almikhlaf Al-Sulimani, and a fierce battle took place over defeat of the army Abu Sharif In October, army of Mohammed Ali Pasha, in charge of the Caliph of Turkey, where they surrounded Bakhrous bin Alas and his tribe Zahran in the Valley, and when Prince Mohammed Bin Dahman al-Shehri with his tribe army of 20,000 men occurred interim near Fort Boukroch, a tough fight broke down and the southern tribes defeated the Ottomans and Egyptians and looted down their arms and their tents and killed many of the Ottoman army, many did not survive and only escaped on horseback. Hussein bin Ali Sharif of Mecca In 1225 e equipped with the Turks a campaign against the tribe of Bani Shehr in order to deter sent Prince Mohammed Bin Dahman al-Shehri's son, Nasser, a huge army of Bani Shehr men confronted the Ottoman troops in the Battle of (Otanin) in (Northern Namas) and were able to expel the Turks, and humiliate them.

== See also ==
- Bani Buhair
