= Jabal ʽUmayyid =

Mountain in Tabūk, Saudi Arabia

- Location within Saudi Arabia

Highest point
- Coordinates: 28°39′15″N 35°18′21″E

Geography
- Location: Saudi Arabia
- Parent range: Madiyan Mountains

Climbing
- First ascent: prehistory

Jabal ʽUmayyid is a mountain located in the Madiyan Mountains of northwest Saudi Arabia, near the Jordan border, above the Gulf of Aqaba, and is located in Tabūk, Saudi Arabia. It is one of the tallest mountains in the Arabian Peninsula.

== See also ==
- List of mountains in Saudi Arabia
