= Jabal Mana' =

Mountain in Saudi Arabia

Coordinates: 18°58′N 42°11′E

Jabal Mana' (Arabic: جبل منعاء) is a large mountain, located in the Tannumah area of Bani Shahr, in the Asir region in the southwestern of Saudi Arabia, with a height of 2,782 meters (9,127 feet).

The mountain has a circumference at the base estimated at ten kilometers. There are several petroglyphs including inscriptions of a snake and giants. The interpretation of the glyphs is still uncertain. Near the top of the mountain there is a large cave with inscriptions on the ceiling. The cave rises above a mosque on the hilltop.

It is considered one of the greatest mountains in the Saudi Kingdom. Waterfalls flow from it when the rain comes. Historians like Hamada Ni and several poets have described the mountain including Hashim bin Taha, Mataa Yataj, and Sarat al-Sarhawi.

== See also ==
- List of mountains in Saudi Arabia
