= Jabal an Nukhaylah =

- Location within Saudi Arabia

Highest point
- Coordinates: 28°39′15″N 35°18′21″E

Geography
- Location: Saudi Arabia
- Parent range: Madiyan Mountains

Climbing
- First ascent: prehistory

Jabal an Nukhaylah is a mountain located in the Madiyan Mountains of northwest Saudi Arabia, near the Jordan border, above the Gulf of Aqaba, and is located in Tabūk, Saudi Arabia.

== See also ==
- List of mountains in Saudi Arabia
