= Hijrah =

Journey of Muhammad from Mecca to Medina

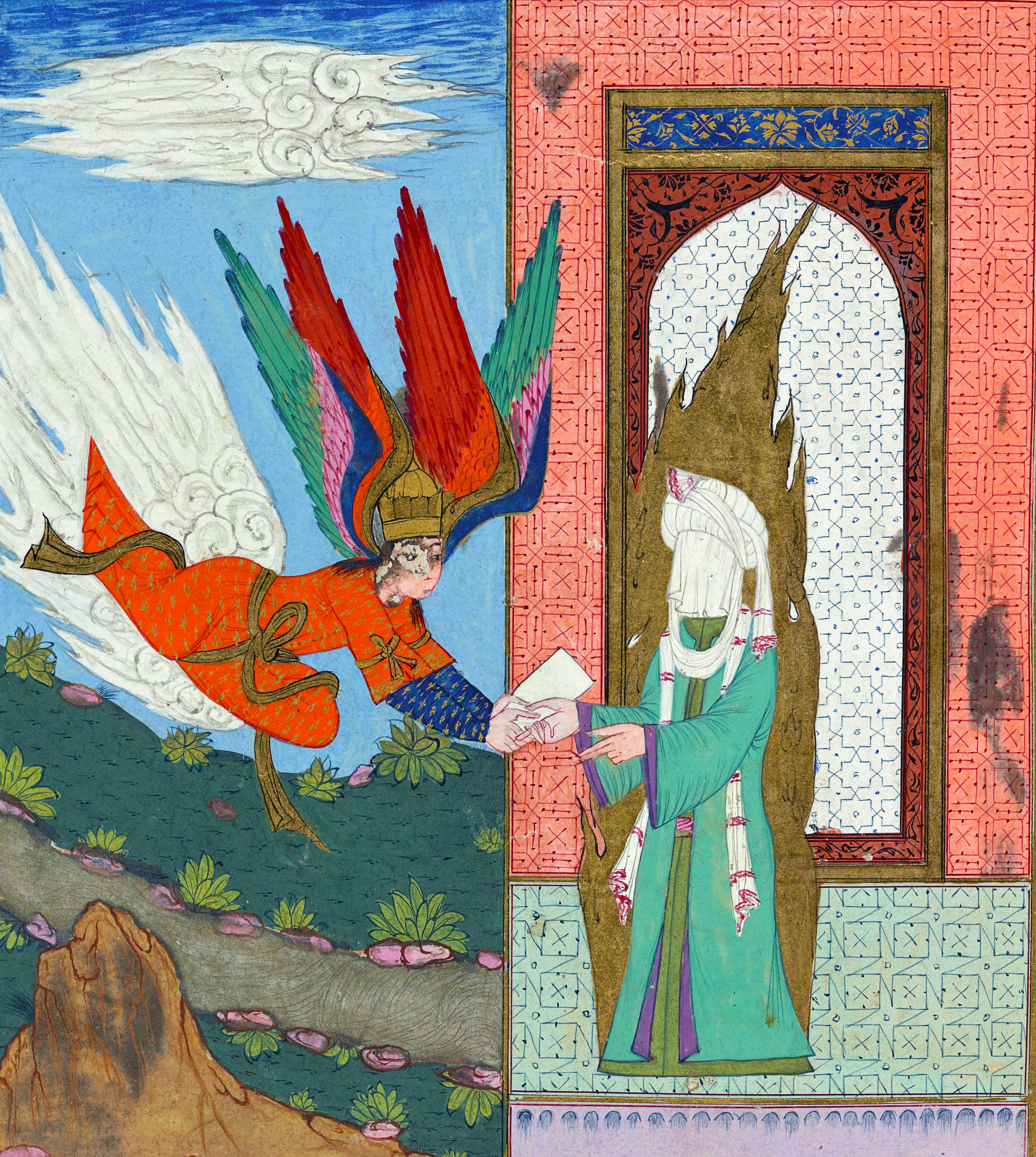
Islamic miniature depicting Jibril delivering to Muhammad a message from God telling him to undertake the Hijrah

Conjectured map of Hijrah route

The Hijrah, (Note: Arabic: الهجرة, romanized: hijra, lit. 'Migration', originally 'a severing of ties of kinship or association') (Arabic: الهجرة, romanized: al-Hijrah, lit. 'migration') also Hegira (from Medieval Latin), was the journey the Islamic prophet Muhammad and his followers took from Mecca to Medina. The year in which the Hijrah took place is also identified as the epoch of the Lunar Hijri (Note: commonly known in the West as 'the' Islamic calendar, though both calendars are used by Muslims.) and Solar Hijri calendars; its date equates to 16 July 622 in the Julian calendar. (Note: 1 Muharram of the new fixed calendar corresponded to Friday, 16 July 622 CE, the equivalent civil tabular date (same daylight period) in the Julian calendar. The Islamic day began at the preceding sunset on the evening of 15 July. This Julian date (16 July) was determined by medieval Muslim astronomers by projecting back in time their own tabular Islamic calendar, which had alternating 30- and 29-day months in each lunar year plus eleven leap days every 30 years. For example, al-Biruni mentioned this Julian date in the year 1000 CE. Although not used by either medieval Muslim astronomers or modern scholars to determine the Islamic epoch, the thin crescent moon would have also first become visible (assuming clouds did not obscure it) shortly after the preceding sunset on the evening of 15 July, 1.5 days after the associated dark moon (astronomical new moon) on the morning of 14 July.)

Early in Muhammad's preaching of Islam, his followers only included his close friends and relatives. Following the spread of his religion, Muhammad and his small faction of Muslims then faced several challenges including a boycott of Muhammad's clan, torture, killing, and other forms of religious persecution by the Meccans. Toward the end of the decade of the 610s CE, Abu Talib, Muhammad's uncle, who supported him amidst the leaders of Mecca, died. Finally, the leaders of Mecca ordered the assassination of Muhammad, which was to be executed by 11 men with swords.

In May 622, after having convened twice with members of the Medinan tribes of Aws and Khazraj at al-'Aqabah near Mina, Muhammad secretly left his home in Mecca to emigrate to their city, along with his friend, father-in-law and companion Abu Bakr.

== Etymology ==
Hijrah is a romanization of the Arabic word هجرة 'to depart to', 'to migrate to' or 'to move away from'. The first stem of the verbal root H-J-R, hajara, means 'to cut off someone from friendly association; to avoid association with'; the third stem, hājara, means 'a mutual termination of friendly relations by leaving or departing'. The word has been mistranslated, without proper context, as 'a severing of ties of kinship or association'. Since 1753, the word has also been used to refer to an exodus in English.

== Background ==
=== Situation in Medina ===
Located more than 260 miles (420 km) north of Mecca, Medina is a verdant oasis. According to Muslim sources, the city was founded by Jews who had survived the revolt against the Romans. While agriculture was far from the domain of the Arab tribes, the Jews were excellent farmers who cultivated the land in the oases. In addition to several smaller Jewish clans, there were three major Jewish tribes in the city: Banu Qaynuqa, Banu Nadir and Banu Qurayza. Over time, Arab tribes from southern Arabia migrated to the city and settled alongside the Jewish community. The Arab tribes comprised Banu Aws and Banu Khazraj, both known collectively as Banu Qayla. Prior to 620, these two Arab tribes had been fighting for nearly a hundred years. Each of them had tried to court the support of the Jewish tribes, which occasionally led to infighting among the latter.

=== Muhammad's encounters with Banu Aws and Banu Khazraj ===
In 620, having lost all hope of winning converts among his fellow townspeople, Muhammad limited his efforts to non-Meccans who attended fairs or made pilgrimages. During these efforts, Muhammad met six members of the Banu Khazraj tribe who were visiting Mecca, on a pilgrimage to the holy sites around the city. These six individuals had a history of raiding Jews in their locality, who in turn had warned them that a prophet would come, and with his help, the Jews would obliterate them. Upon hearing Muhammad's religious message, the six individuals said to each other, "This is the very prophet of whom the Jews warned us; don't let them get to him before us!" After embracing Islam, they returned to Medina and shared their encounter, hoping that by having their people—the Khazraj and the Aws, who had been at odds for so long—accept Islam and adopt Muhammad as their leader, unity could be achieved between them.

In February 621, five earlier converts met with Muhammad again. They were accompanied by seven new converts, including two people from the Banu Aws tribe. This gathering took place at the al-'Aqaba mountain pass, located just north of Mecca near the trade route. At the meeting, they took a pledge to Muhammad, known as the "pledge of women." It was so called because it contained no obligation to fight for Islam. One of the main tenets of this pledge was to renounce idols and affirm Allah as the only deity, with Muhammad as their leader. Muhammad then entrusted Mus'ab ibn Umayr to accompany them on their return to Medina to promote Islam.

In the pilgrimage season of 622, Muhammad had another meeting in al-Aqabah with the Medinan converts; this time, there were 75 of them, including 2 women. Muhammad's uncle al-Abbas, who accompanied him, made a speech at the beginning, declaring that Muhammad was "the most respected person among his kinsmen." This is quite in contrast with the fact that Muhammad had received strong opposition from his other uncle, Abu Lahab, as well as Abu Jahl and other Quraysh leaders. Al-Abbas also falsely stated that Muhammad had rejected offers from all but the men of Medina in an apparent attempt to create a sense of exclusivity and importance among them. Historical records, however, show that they were among the last groups Muhammad had tried to approach and that he had no other offers available.

Muhammad himself then spoke and invited their allegiance, asking them to protect him as they would their women and children. One of them, al-Bara, readily agreed, emphasizing the military prowess of his people. The other however, Abu al-Haytham, expressed concern that if they took the pledge and severed their ties with the Jews, Muhammad would return to his people after they gave him victories. Muhammad assured them that he was now one with them and would share their fate in war and peace. Twelve delegates, three from the Aws and nine from the Khazraj, were then selected to oversee the implementation of this pact. When the group inquired about the reward for their loyalty, Muhammad simply replied, "Paradise." They then took the oath, the second pledge at al-Aqabah, also known as the pledge of war.

== Migration ==
Quba Mosque, the first mosque in the history of Islam, at the outskirts of Medina. It was founded by Islamic prophet Muhammad when he immigrated to Medina

Not long after receiving the pledges, Muhammad instructed his Meccan followers to relocate to Medina. The whole departure spanned about three months. To ensure that he did not arrive in Medina alone while his followers remained in Mecca, Muhammad chose not to go ahead and instead stayed behind to watch over them and persuade those who were reluctant. Some of the Quraysh tried to dissuade their family members from leaving, but in the end, there were no Muslims left in Mecca. Muhammad regarded this migration as an expulsion by the Quraysh.

Islamic tradition relates that, in light of the unfolding events, one of the Quraysh chiefs, Abu Jahl, Muhammad's childhood friend-turned-enemy, proposed a joint assassination of Muhammad by representatives of each Quraysh clan. Having been informed of this by the angel Gabriel, Muhammad asked his cousin Ali to lie on his bed covered with his green hadrami cloak, assuring him that it would keep him safe. Muhammad then went with Abu Bakr to a cave in Mount Thawr, about an hour's walk south of Mecca, and hid there. Abu Bakr's children and servants, who were still in Mecca, regularly brought them food. After three days in hiding, they set out for Medina on camels that Abu Bakr had bought in advance, and accompanied by a guide, Abdallah ibn Arqat, who was a pagan.

== Aftermath and legacy ==
Muhammad's followers suffered from poverty after fleeing persecution in Mecca and migrating with Muhammad to Medina. Their Meccan persecutors seized their wealth and belongings left behind in Mecca. Beginning in January 623, Muhammad led several raids against Meccan caravans travelling along the eastern coast of the Red Sea. Members of different tribes were thus unified by the urgency of the moment. This unity was primarily based on the bonds of kinship.

The Constitution of Medina formalised Muhammad as the Chief Justice, making him as the foremost judicial authority responsible for resolving conflicts and overseeing judicial welfare of Medina. This later unified the diverse tribal groups, including the Jewish tribes, and ended long‑standing internecine tensions. Muhammad exercised ultimate decision making in dispute resolution, explaining the law, and maintenance of public order.

The second Rashidun Caliph, Umar ibn Al-Khattab, designated the Muslim year during which the Hegira occurred the first year of the Islamic calendar in 638 or the 17th year of the Hegira. This was later Latinized to Anno Hegirae, the abbreviation of which is still used to denote Hijri dates today. Burnaby states that: "Historians in general assert that Muhammad fled from Mecca at the commencement of the third month of the Arabian year, Rabi 'u-l-awwal. They do not agree as to the precise day. According to Ibn-Ishak, it was on the first or second day of the month".

Several Islamic historians and scholars, including Al Biruni, Ibn Sa'd, and Ibn Hisham, have discussed these dates in depth.

== See also ==
- Battle of Badr – First major battle in early Islam (624)
- Early Muslim conquests – Expansion of the Islamic state (622–750)
- Glossary of Islam – Romanised words from Arabic or Persian
- Hajj – Islamic pilgrimage to Mecca
- Laylat al-Mabit – Muhammad's flight from Mecca to Yathrib
- List of expeditions of Muhammad
- Rakuba – Mountain road in Saudi Arabia
- Sīrah – Biographies of Muhammad

== Bibliography ==
- Gil, Moshe (27 February 1997). A History of Palestine, 634–1099. Cambridge University Press. ISBN 978-0-521-59984-9. OCLC 779476694.
- Gibb, Hamilton Alexander Rosskeen; Lewis, Brian; Donzel, Emeri J. van; Bosworth, Clifford Edmund (1986). The Encyclopaedia of Islam: Vol. 1-. E.J. Brill. OCLC 872092039.
- Rodgers, Russ (2012). The Generalship of Muhammad: Battles and Campaigns of the Prophet of Allah. University Press of Florida. ISBN 978-0-8130-3766-0. OCLC 797916550.
- Gabriel, Richard A. (2007). Muhammad: Islam's First Great General. University of Oklahoma Press. ISBN 978-0-8061-3860-2. OCLC 78788501.
- Peters, F. E. (9 March 2021). Judaism, Christianity, and Islam: The Classical Texts and Their Interpretation, Volume I: From Covenant to Community. Princeton University Press. ISBN 978-0-691-22682-8. OCLC 1132222513.
- Glubb, Sir John Bagot (2001). The Life and Times of Muhammad. Cooper Square Press. ISBN 978-0-8154-1176-5. OCLC 50273853.
- Holt, Peter Malcolm; Lambton, Ann K. S.; Lewis, Bernard (1978). The Cambridge History of Islam. Cambridge University Press. ISBN 978-0-521-29135-4. OCLC 828737664.
- Muranyi, Miklos (1998). The Life of Muhammad. Ashgate. ISBN 978-0-86078-703-7. OCLC 1338681712.
- Gordon, Matthew (30 May 2005). The Rise of Islam. Greenwood Publishing Group. ISBN 978-0-313-32522-9. OCLC 57613641.
- Rodinson, Maxime (2 March 2021). Muhammad. New York Review of Books. ISBN 978-1-68137-493-2. OCLC 1150849724.
- Fontaine, P. F. M. (4 October 2022). Imperialism in Medieval History I: Dualism in Byzantine History 476–638 and Dualism in Islam 572–732. BRILL. ISBN 978-90-04-50234-5. OCLC 1348484291.
- Peters, F. E. (6 April 1994). Muhammad and the Origins of Islam. State University of New York Press. ISBN 978-1-4384-1597-0. OCLC 42636559.
- Schacht; Lewis; Pellat; Ménage, eds. (26 June 1998). Encyclopaedia of Islam, Volume III (H-Iram): [Fasc. 41-60, 60a]. Brill. ISBN 978-90-04-08118-5. OCLC 223374133.
- Lewis, Bernard (2002). The Arabs in History. Oxford, New York: Oxford University Press. ISBN 978-0-19-280310-8. OCLC 784886690.
- Buhl, F.; Welch, A.T. (1993). "Muḥammad". Encyclopaedia of Islam. Vol. 7 (2nd ed.). Brill. ISBN 978-90-04-09419-2. OCLC 872092039.
