= Jabal Al-Qo'mah =

Mountain in Saudi Arabia

Jabal Al-Qo'mah (Arabic: جبل القعمة) is a mountain of Saudi Arabia. The mountain is 2,707 meters high and located at 17°51′50″N 43°25′25″E.

Administratively affiliated to the Al-Harajah Center in Dhahran Al-Janub Governorate in Asir Region, this mountain is one of the lower-elevation mountains among the eastern range surrounding Al-Harajah, an area noted for its relatively good vegetation cover unlike other mountains in the vicinity.

== See also ==
- List of mountains in Saudi Arabia
