= Jabal Al-Oraif =

Mountain in Saudi Arabia

Location of Saudi Arabia

Jabal Al-Oraif (Arabic: جبل العريف) is a mountain in Saudi Arabia, located at 17°19′21″N, 43°19′37″E and is 2632 meters in height above sea level.

== See also ==
- List of mountains in Saudi Arabia
