= Bani Buhair =

Bani Buhair in Saudi Arabia is a southern tribe that traces back to the sub-tribe Bani Rizq falling under the mother tribe, Bilqarn, in the Balqarn region. The speakers of the Bani Buhair dialect numbered between 8000 and 8600 in 2016.

== See also ==
- Bani Shehr
