= Rakuba =

Mountain road in Saudi Arabia

Geography
- Location: Saudi Arabia

Geology
- Mountain type: Mountain road

Rukuba is a mountain road in Saudi Arabia.

== Mentions of historians and geographers ==
=== Al-Bakri Andalusian ===
Al-Bakri stated that: "Rukuba is a mountain road that presents a number of challenges to navigation due to its uneven terrain."

This route was traversed by the Muhammad during the Expedition of Tabuk and his Hijrah to Medina.

=== Al-Zamakhshari ===
Al-Zamakhshari stated that: "It is a mountain road presents a challenging and uneven surface that requires careful navigation."

=== Al-Iskandari ===
Al-Iskandari stated that: "Rakuba it is a mountain road presents a challenging and uneven surface between Mecca and Medina".

=== Yaqut Al-Hamawi ===
Yaqut al-Hamawi stated that: "Muhammad traversed the route while undertaking the hijrah to Medina, situated in proximity to Wareqan Mountain and Edqes Mountain."

=== Bin Abd Alhaqq Albaghdadi ===
Bin Abd Alhaqq Albaghdadi stated that: "It is a mountain road that presents a number of challenges to navigation due to its uneven terrain between Mecca and Medina, at Al-Araj, near Wareqan Mountain, on which Muhammad have traveled during the Hijrah."

=== Al-Samhudi ===
Al-Samhudi stated that: "A mountain road between Mecca and Medina at Al-Araj, three miles from it to the direction of Medina, as will be mentioned in Al-Mudarj. Ibn Ishaq states in his account of Hijrah that the group's guide proceeded to lead them from al-Arj to Thaniyat al-Ghayr, situated to the right of Rukuba."

Al-Majd said: "Muhammad rode a proverbially difficult fold when he migrated to Medina, near Wareqan Mountain and Edqes Mountain, and was accompanied by Abdullah bin Abdu-nahm."

=== Al-Blady Al-Harby ===
Al-Blady Al-Harby stated that: "The term "Rakuba" is a transliteration of the word "riding", which was mentioned during the Hijrah."

He Said: "Subsequently, the group's guide proceeded to lead them out of Al-Araj and took them to Thunyat al-Ghayr, situated to the right of Rakuba. Ibn Hisham states that Rakuba is situated to the right of Thunyat al-Ghayr for those embarking on the journey to Medina."

== See also ==
- List of mountains in Saudi Arabia.
- Ubla mountains
