= Jabal Masher =

location of Saudi Arabia

Jabal Masher (Arabic: جبل مسحر) is a mountain in Saudi Arabia that is 2640m in height.

== Location ==
Mount Masar is located at 18°12′32″N 43°12′33E near the Yemen border and near al Jawf, in the area of Muammar, and has a height above sea level of more than 2600 metres.

== History ==
The mountain has an ancient history including many ancient carvings and the "path of the elephant", a route historically linked to the attempt by Abraha Al-Ashram, the Aksumite, Christian ruler of Yemen to demolish the Kaaba, during the Year of the Elephant, described in the Quran.

== See also ==
- List of mountains in Saudi Arabia
