= Jildiyyah Mountain =

Mountain in Saudi Arabia

Coordinates: 27°40′21″N 42°15′14″E

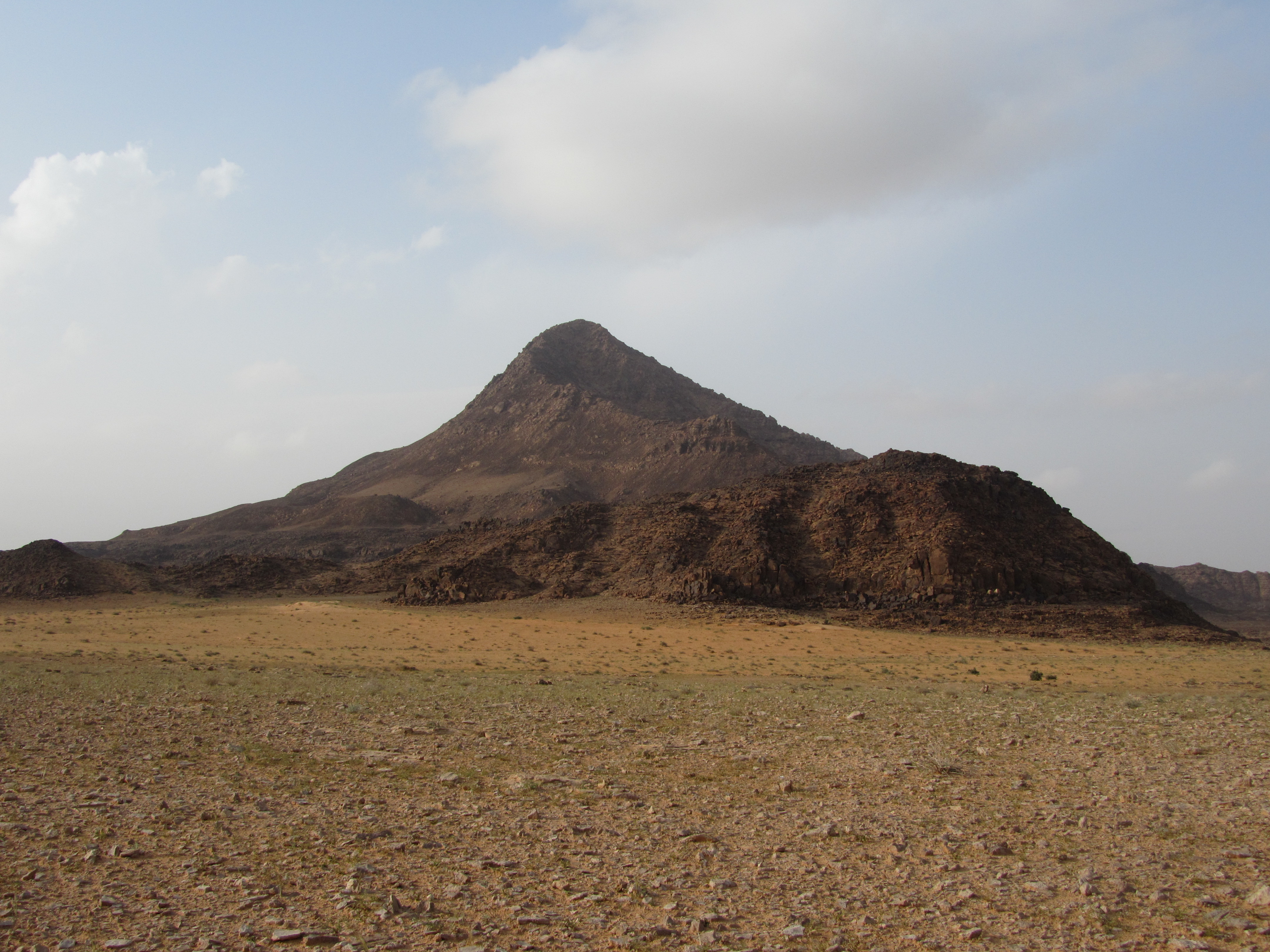
Jildiyyah Mountain.

Jildiyyah Mountain (جبل جلدية) meaning Leather mount (it was also called Gelve and Gelveh) is a mount located in Saudi Arabia, and has a height of 1,107 meters (3,632 feet). Although the mount is not high by Saudi standards it has come to hold a high profile in Arab culture.

The mountain and the hills surrounding it are sites of important archaeological value, containing many ancient petroglyphs and a number of rock carvings with human and animal back to prehistory. The mountain also appears in Arab poetry.

Jildiyyah Mountain is reported in the writings ancient Arabs, including the Umayyad period in poetry of Abdulaziz bin Arzazh hamate, and in the writing of some medieval Islamic writers historians and geographers such as Abu Ali Ah, and al - Bakri, and Asamhudy.

Jildiyyah Mountain was an important landmark for pilgrims traversing the range due to its visibility from great distances, and during the rule of Al Rashid, the mountain was an important gathering for the start of his invasion.

In the 17th -19th century Orientalists, including: Doughty, and Huber, and Anne Blunt, Moselle described it in their journals and Julius Ouitinj, painted the mountain.

Jildiyyah Mountain is composed of igneous rocks which are mostly brown-purple granite and is divided into the main mountain and several hills to the east, west and south, known as the fingers.

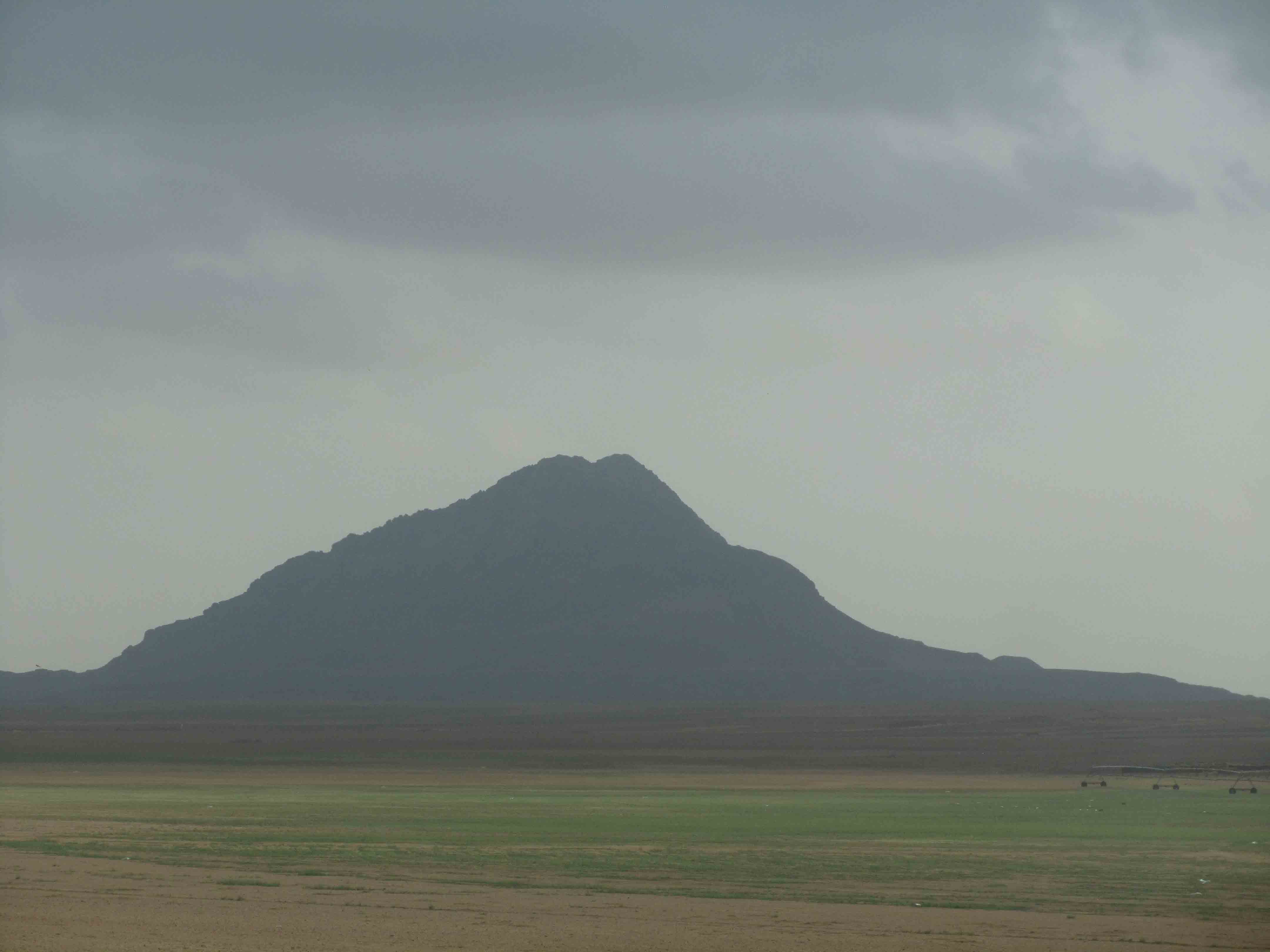
Main mount

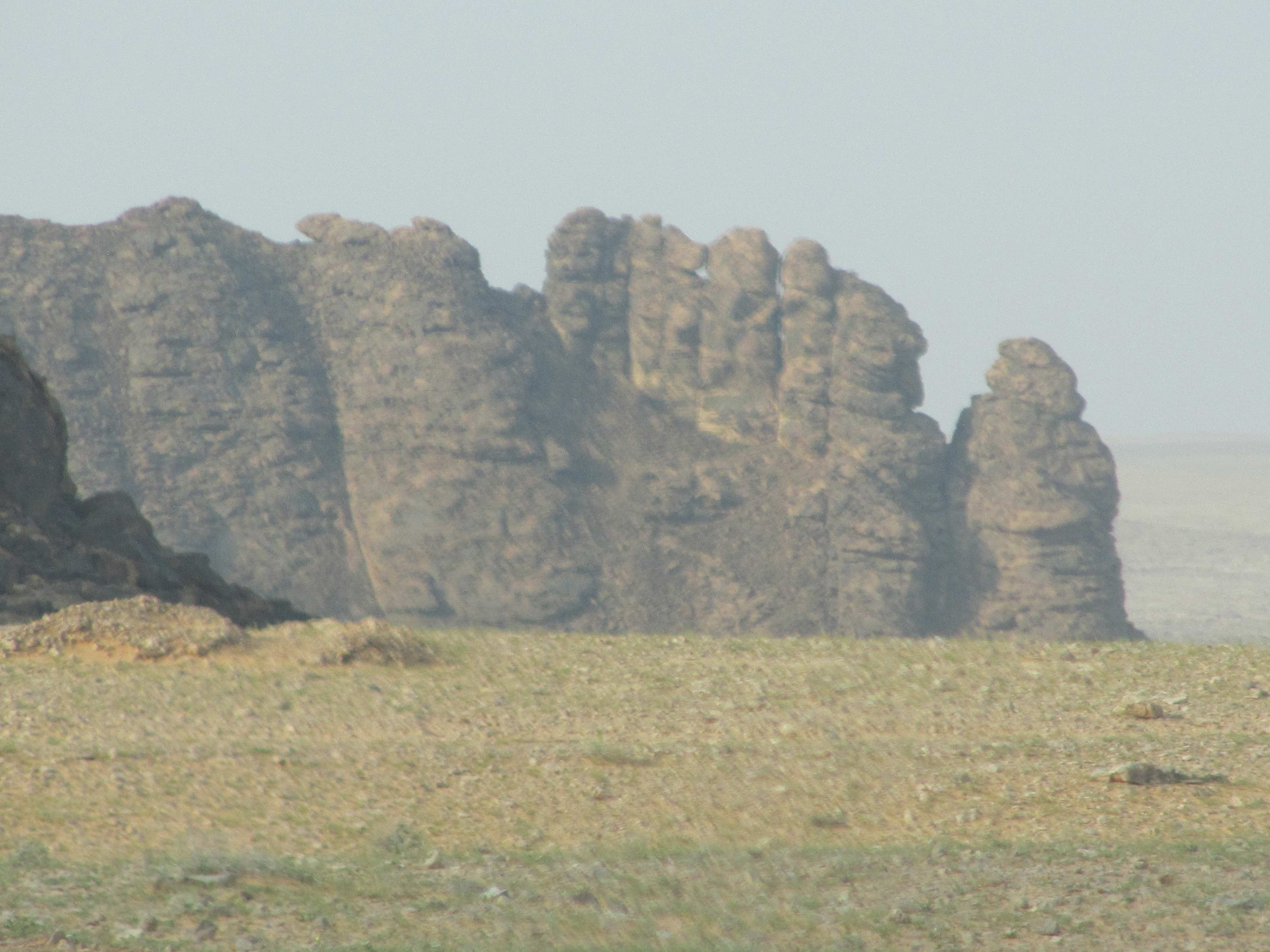
The Fingers

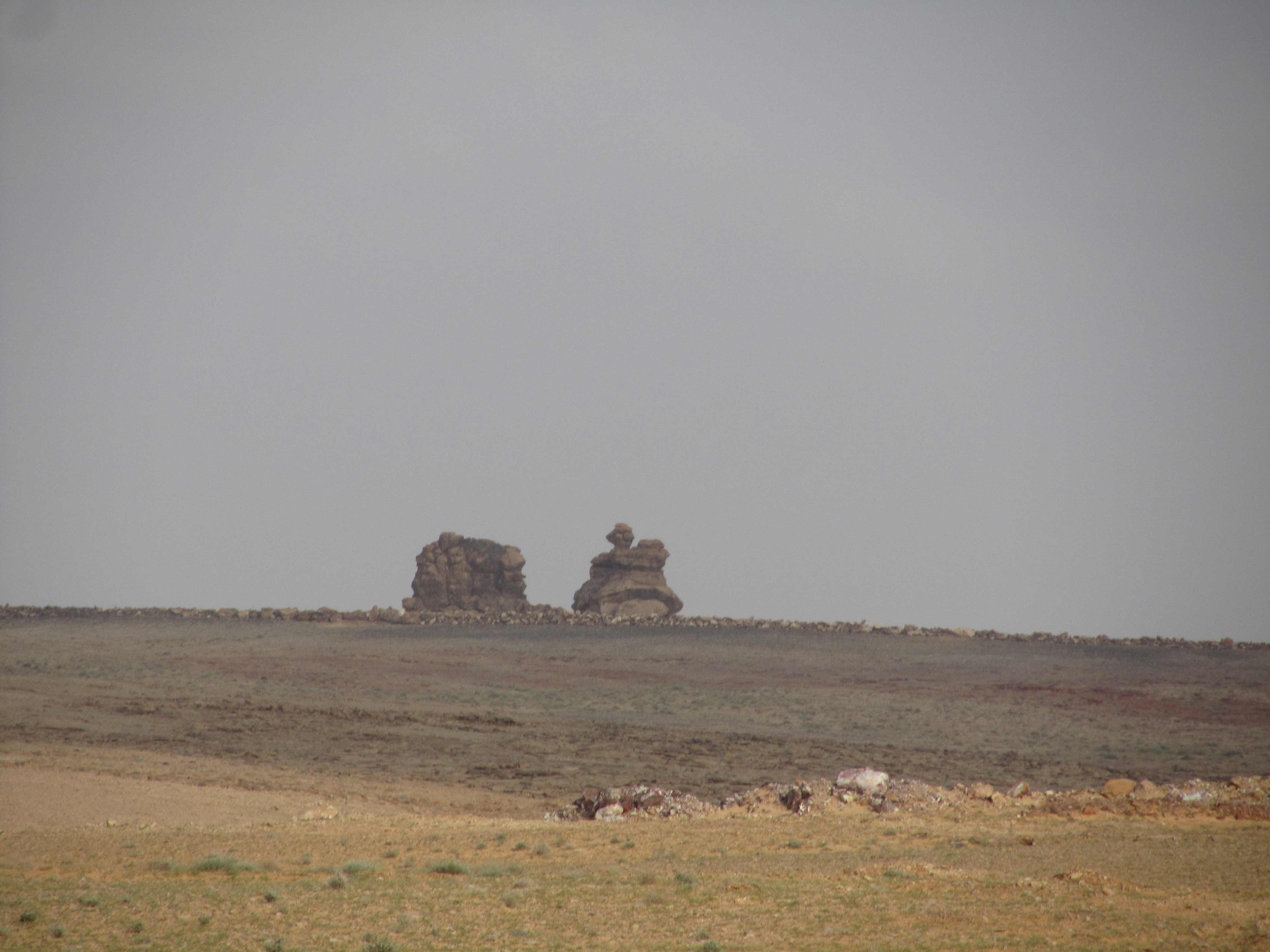
Ckta Al_khasaan southeast of Mount Jildiyyah

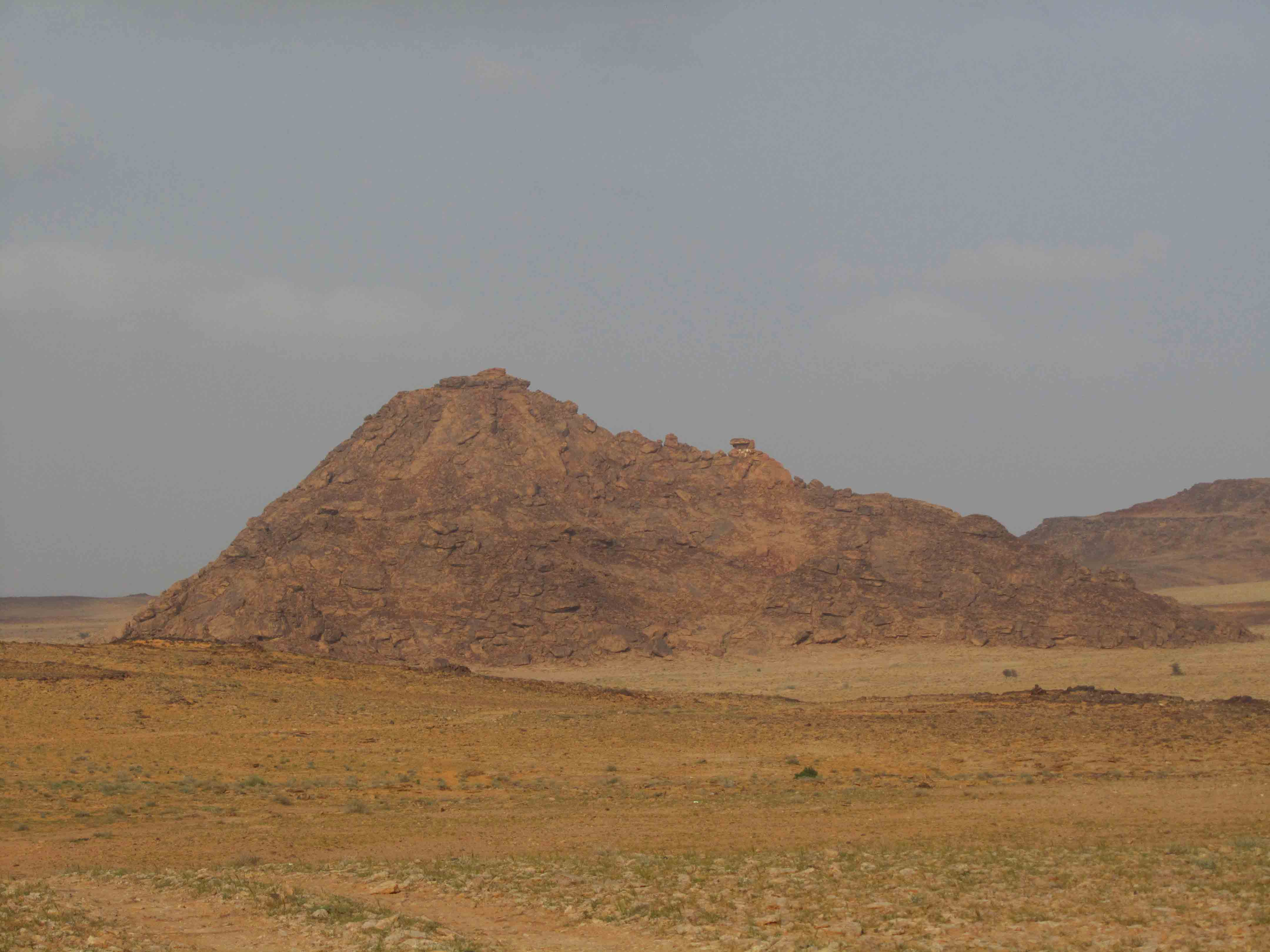
Qlaib Jildiyyah

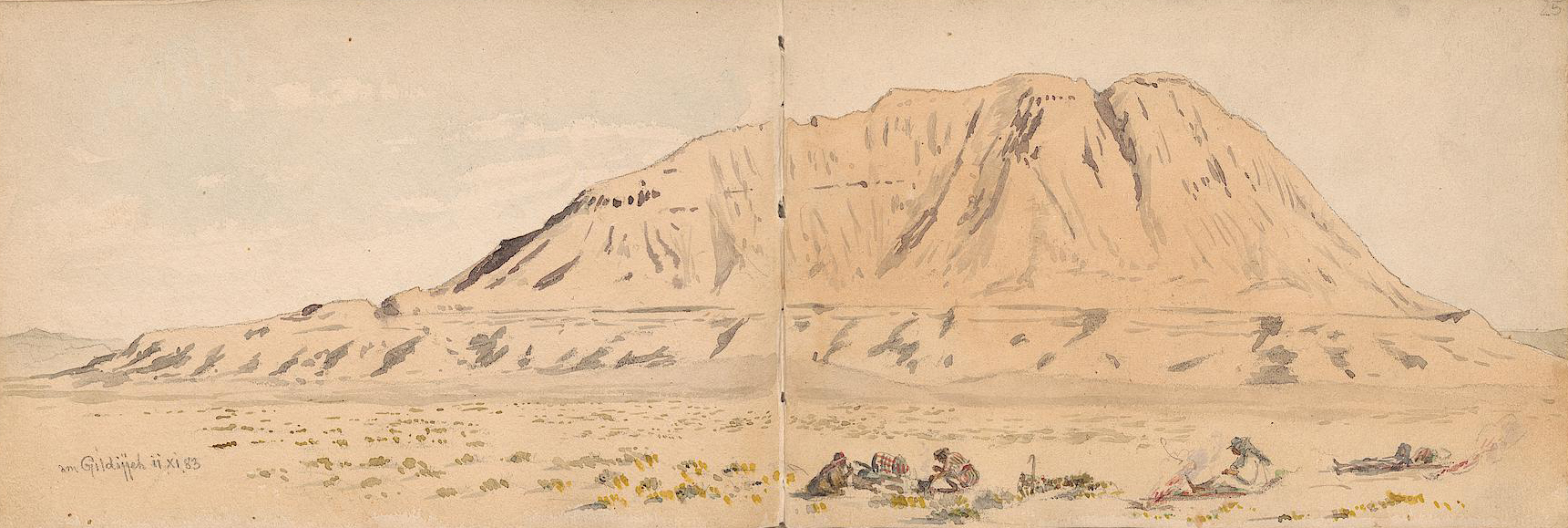
Jildiyyah Mountain (1881)
