= Tanomah =

Governorate in Asir Province, Saudi Arabia

Tanomah تنومة
- Governorate
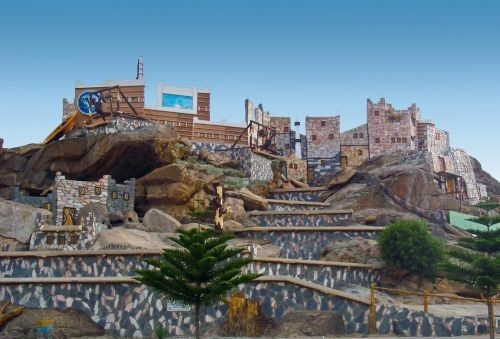
- Suburbs of Tanomah

- Location of Tanomah Governorate within Aseer Province

- Location within Saudi Arabia
- Coordinates: 18°56′50″N 42°10′35″E
- Country: Saudi Arabia
- Province: Aseer Province
- Region: Sarawat Mountains
- Seat: Tanomah City

Government
  - Type: Municipality
  - Body: Tanomah Municipality

Population (2022)
  - Total: 17,756
- Time zone: UTC+03:00 (SAST)

Tanomah also spelled Tanumah (Arabic: تنومة), is a governorate in Aseer Province, Saudi Arabia. It is located in the southwestern part of the country, approximately 120 km north of Abha.

== See also ==
- Jabal Maomah
- Provinces of Saudi Arabia
- List of mountains in Saudi Arabia
- List of governorates of Saudi Arabia
- List of cities and towns in Saudi Arabia
