= Sarat Ubaida Governorate =

Coordinates: 18.084764°N 43.138569°E

Sarat Abidah Governorate within Saudi Arabia

Sarat Abidah Governorate (Arabic: محافظة سراة عبيدة), located in the southwestern part of Saudi Arabia, is one of twelve governorates of the Asir Province.

== Location ==
Sarat Abidah, an affiliated Saudi province of Asir Emirate, is located on the Khamis Mushayt international road in southwestern Saudi Arabia. Sarat Abidah is north of the border with Yemen; it is 93 kilometres (58 miles) from the city of Abha and 40 kilometres (25 miles) from the city of Dhahran Aljanoub. It has approximately 273 villages, a population of about 3,060 and an area where the structural plan, adopted in 1417, is about 4,200 hectares (16 sq mi). It is 120 kilometres (75 mi) long and 38 kilometres (24 mi) wide, with an area of around 450 square kilometres (170 sq mi).

== History ==
The area has a 2,000-year history. The name comes from Sarat, meaning "summit or peak", and Abidah is the matronymic given to the tribes residing in this region based on their common female ancestor. Sarat Abidah has been a trading station and has become a center of markets and a breeding ground for caravans. The Almsaferah line passes through the region.

== Climate ==
The climate of Sarat Abidah varies. It experiences mild to cold winters. The summer maximum temperature is about 25 °C (77 °F), dropping to nearly 5 °C (41 °F) in winter and has a moderate rate of precipitation and average humidity of 45%. The region is characterized by the Tihama Qahtan wind, which is hot in the summer and moderate in the winter. The region is mountainous and sometimes experiences fog on the slopes at Altdarisi.
