= Al-Namas =

Famous hill station governorate of 'Asir Province, Saudi Arabia

al-Namas النماص
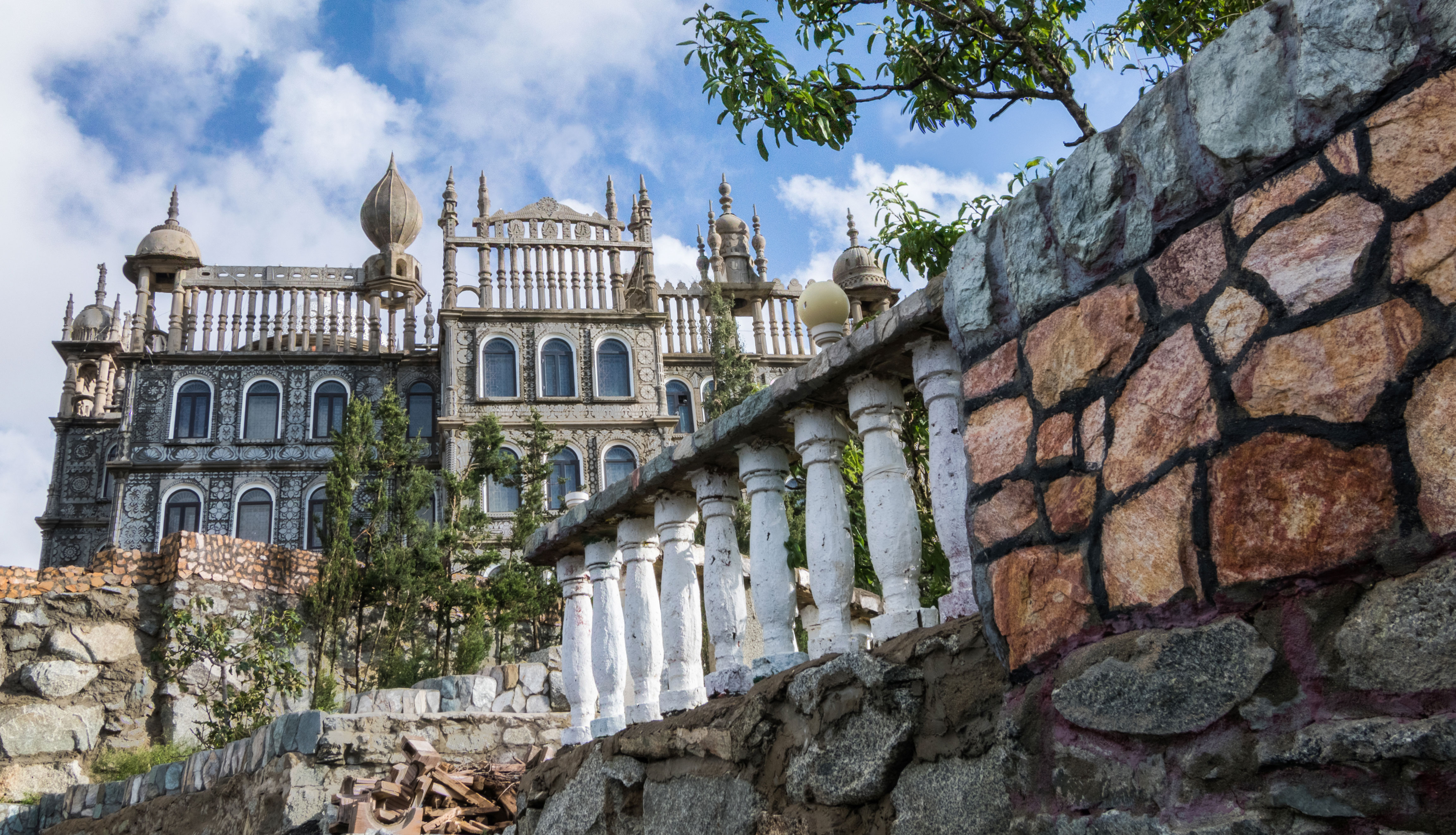
- Al Maqar Palace

- Location within Saudi Arabia
- Coordinates: 19°07′12″N 42°07′48″E
- Country: Saudi Arabia
- Province: Asir Province
- Elevation: 2,385 m (7,825 ft)

Population (2016)
  - Total: 53,908
- Area code: +966 17

Al-Namas (Arabic: النماص) is a governorate in Asir Province, Saudi Arabia about 120 kilometres (75 mi) north of Abha.

== Climate ==
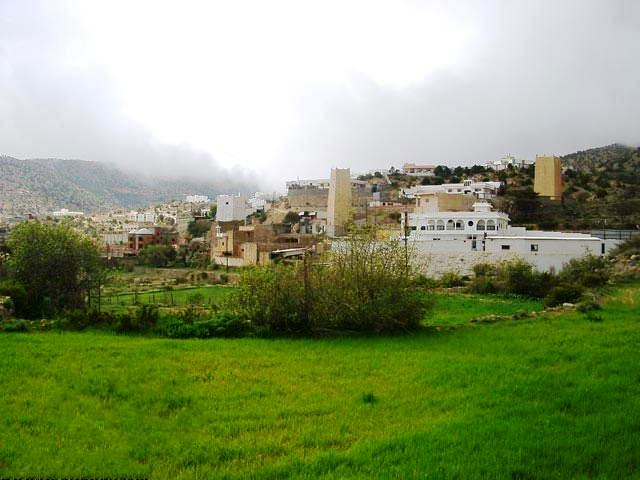
al-Namas

Al-Namas is slightly wetter than Abha, with about 10–30 mm (0.39–1.18 in) higher average monthly rainfall from February to April and about 5–15 mm (0.20–0.59 in) lower monthly rainfall during September and October.

== Education ==
The Al-Namas Branch of Bisha University includes a Community College, a College of Arts & Sciences for male students and another for girls, and a College of Health Sciences for Girls. Al-Namas also has a technical college which offers vocational training for boys.

== Politics ==
After student protests over conditions at the Abha campus of King Khalid University on 6 and 7 March 2012 and a follow-up sit-in on 10 March calling for the head of the university to resign, protests also occurred in the al-Namas campus of the university.
