= Sarawat Mountains =

Mountain range in Saudi Arabia and Yemen

- Sarat
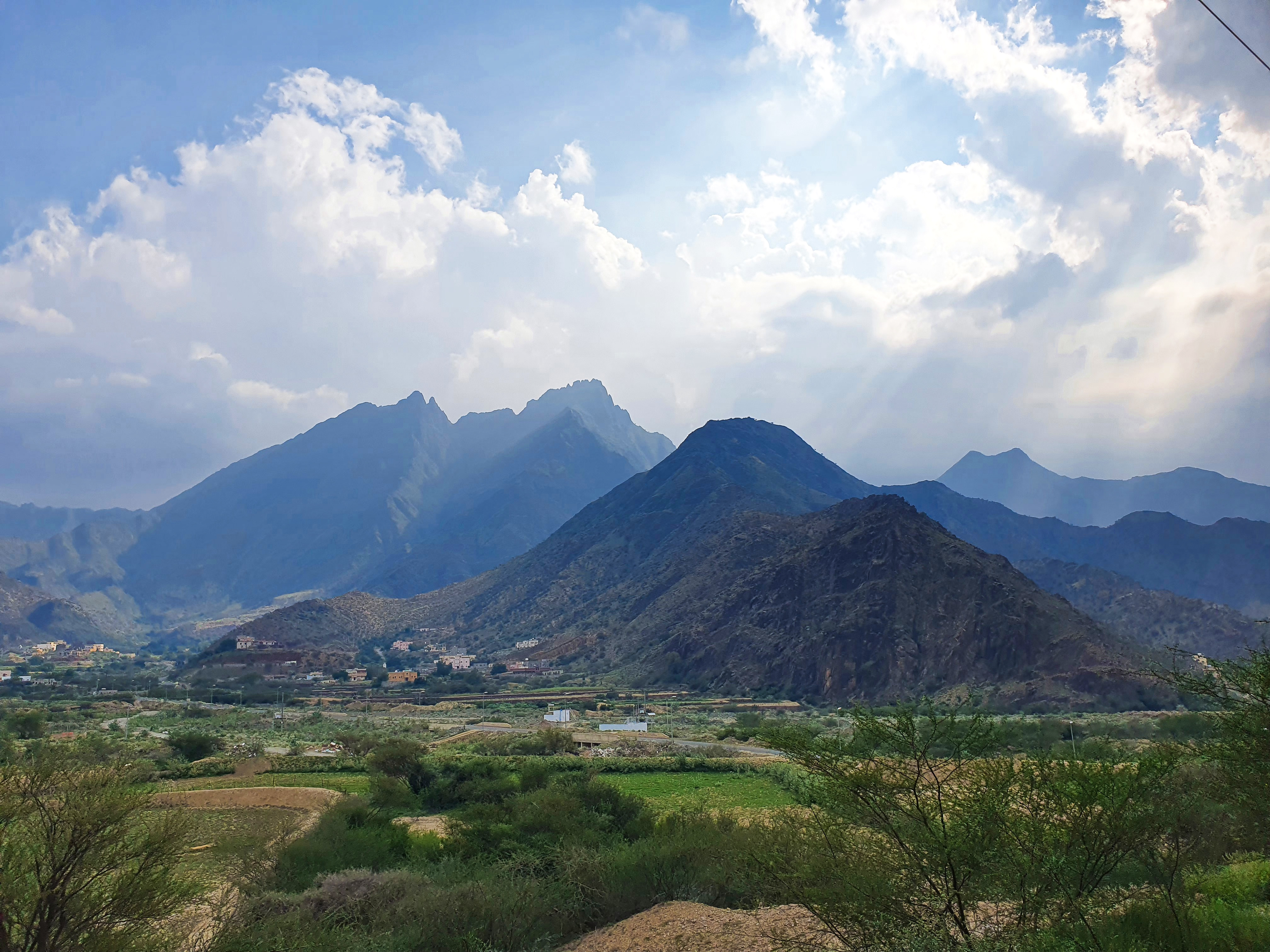
- Sarawat mountains of Al-Bahah, Saudi Arabia.

Highest point
- Peak: Jabal An-Nabi Shu'ayb, Yemen
- Elevation: 3,666 m (12,028 ft)

Naming
- Native name: Jibāl As-Sarawāt (جِبَالُ ٱلسَّرَوَاتِ)

Geography
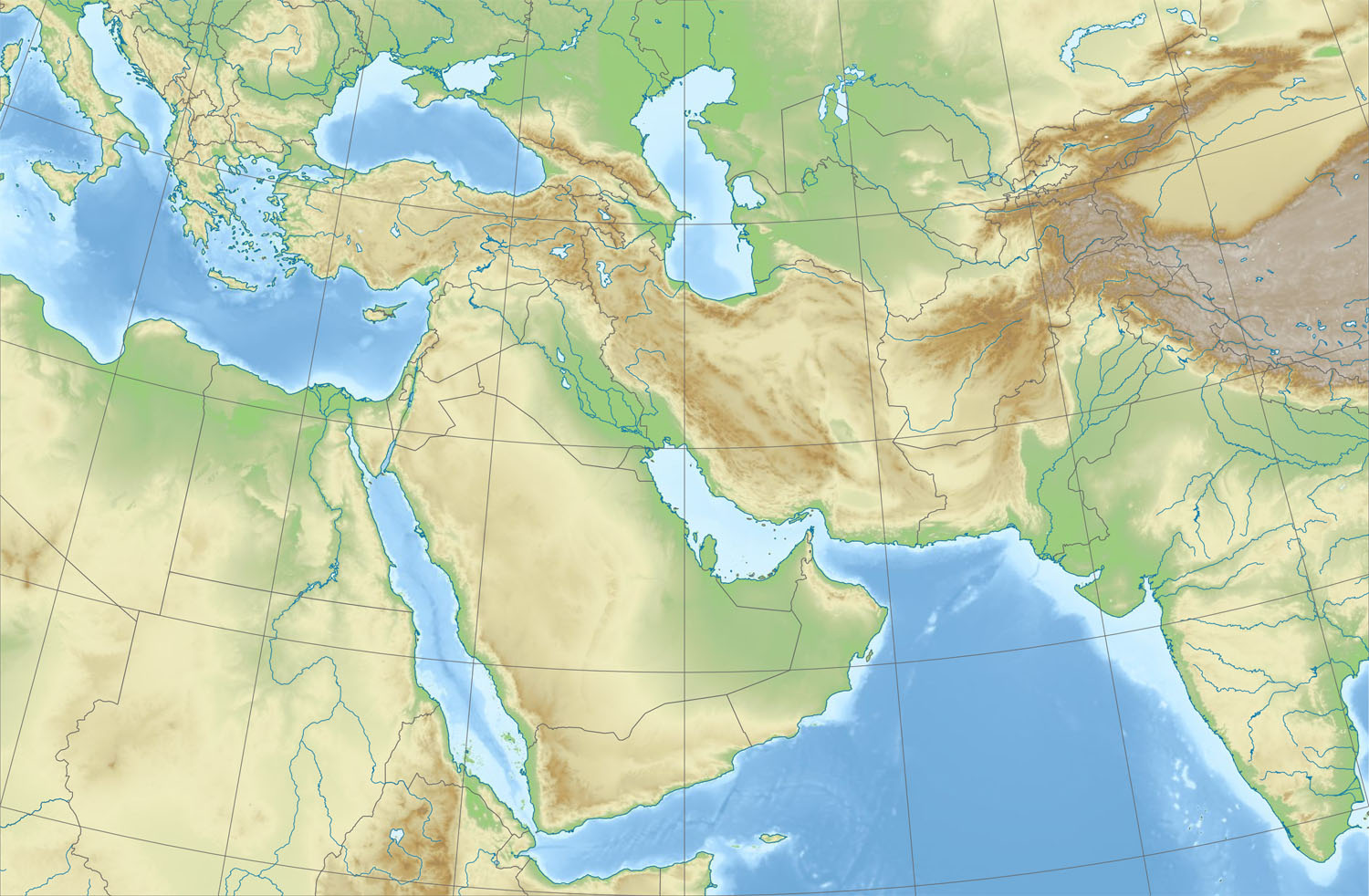
- Location within Saudi Arabia Location within Middle East Location within West and Central Asia
- Countries: Saudi Arabia; Yemen
- Range coordinates: 18°16′02″N 42°22′05″E

The Sarawat Mountains (Arabic: جِبَالُ ٱلسَّرَوَاتِ, romanized: Jibāl as-Sarawāt), also known as the Sarat in the singular, is a mountain range in the western part of the Arabian Peninsula. In a broad sense, it runs parallel to the eastern coast of the Red Sea, and thus encompasses the mountains of Fayfa, Asir, Taif, and the Hijaz (which can be seen as including the Midian Mountains). In a narrow sense, the Sarawat start in Taif city in Saudi Arabia, and extend to the Gulf of Aden in the south, running along the entire western coast of Yemen and extending eastwards parallel to the Gulf of Aden.

== Geology ==
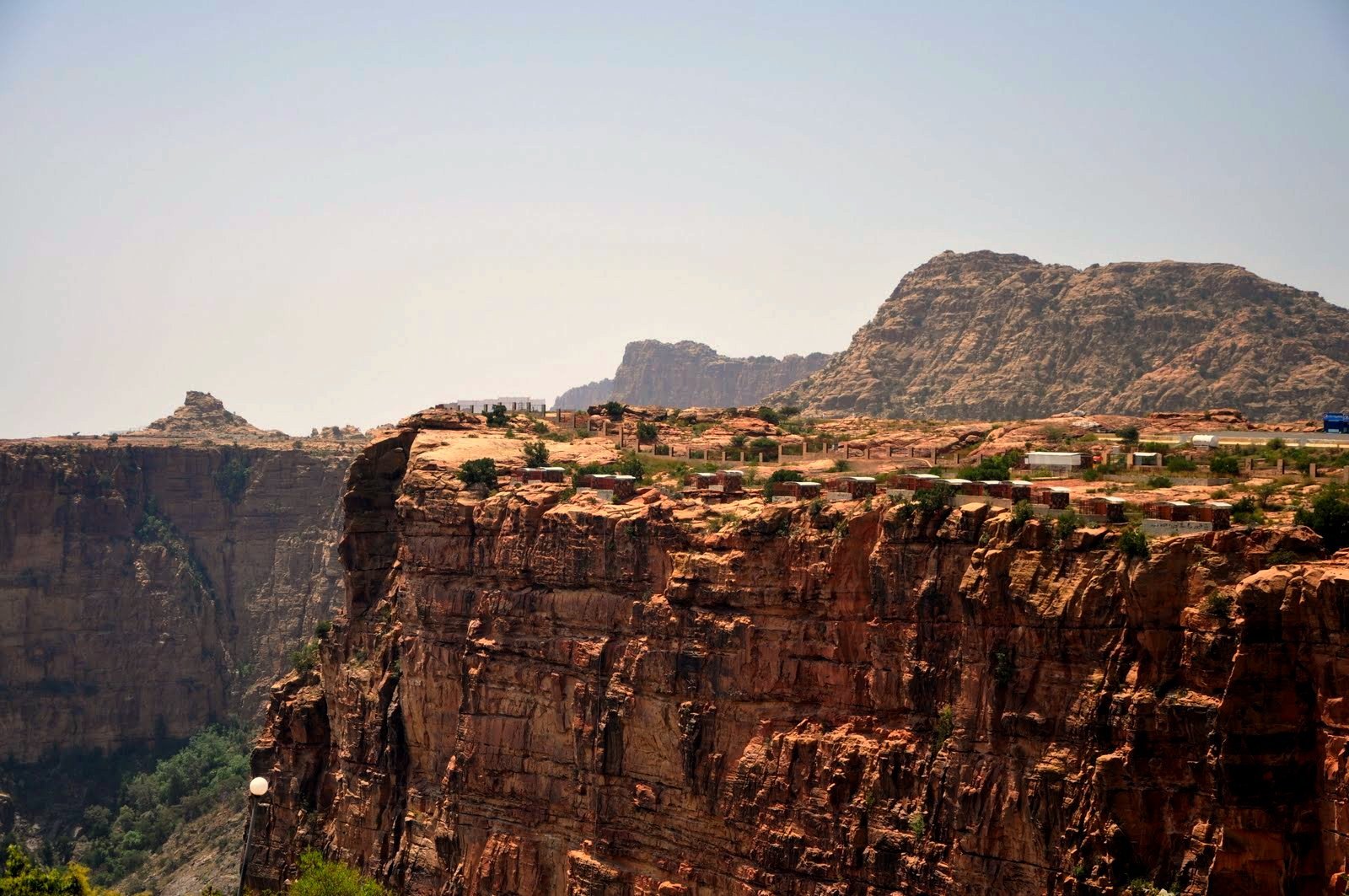
Habala Valley near Ahad Rafidah in the Asir Mountains of Saudi Arabia

These mountains are mainly rocky with sparse vegetation. The peaks are fairly young and jagged, with some weathering. Near the Yemeni border, the Sarawat begin to spread into individual peaks, and the Hejaz turns from a cliff to a gradual ascent from the Red Sea to the Yemeni Plateau. In Yemen, the Sarawat are divided into the western and central highlands. The western highlands receive plenty of precipitation, more than anywhere else in the peninsula, and the central highlands have the highest mountains in the peninsula. In Yemen the Haraz Mountains have few peaks topping 3,000 metres (9,800 feet), but the descents and views from the mountains are dramatic; their feet are only at 500 metres (1,600 feet) above sea level yet their peaks are at 2,800–3,300 metres (9,200–10,800 feet). The mountains over 3,000 metres (9,800 feet) are all located in Yemen. The highest is Jabal An-Nabi Shu'ayb near the capital Sana'a. At 3,666 metres (12,028 feet), Jabal An-Nabi Shu'ayb is also the highest peak in Arabia.

Geologically, the Sarawat are part of the Arabian Shield, and are made up mostly of volcanic rock. The western slopes end abruptly near the Red Sea coast. The slopes on the eastern side are more gentle and are intersected by wadis that support agriculture, especially in the southern reaches of the Sarawat, where the mountains face the Indian Ocean monsoons. San'a, the capital of Yemen, is located near some of the Sarawat's highest peaks.

== Wildlife ==
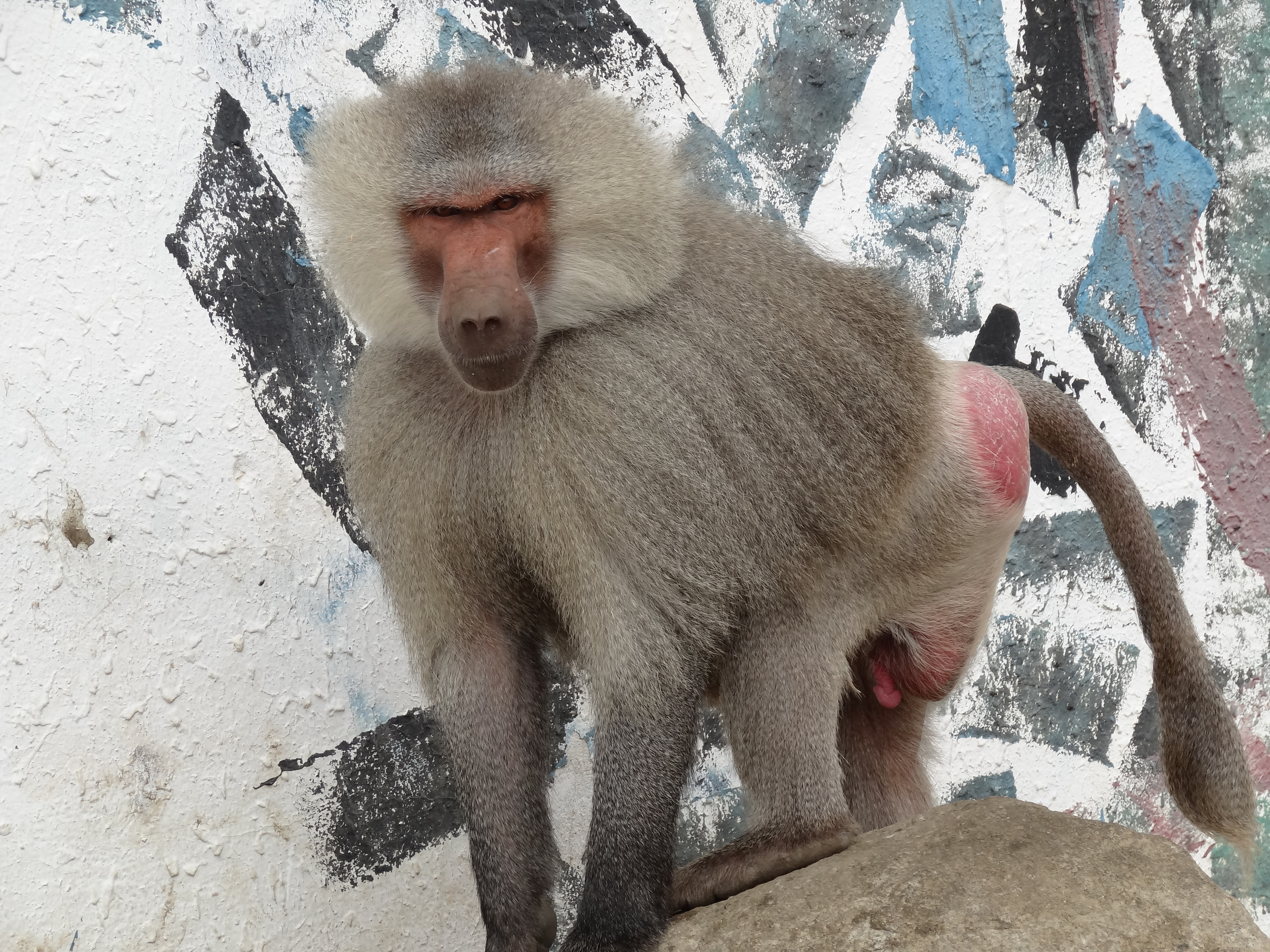
Hamadryas baboon near Ta'if in the Hejaz

The presence of the Arabian leopard was reported here. Hamadryas baboons are present in both Yemen and Saudi Arabia.

== Gallery ==
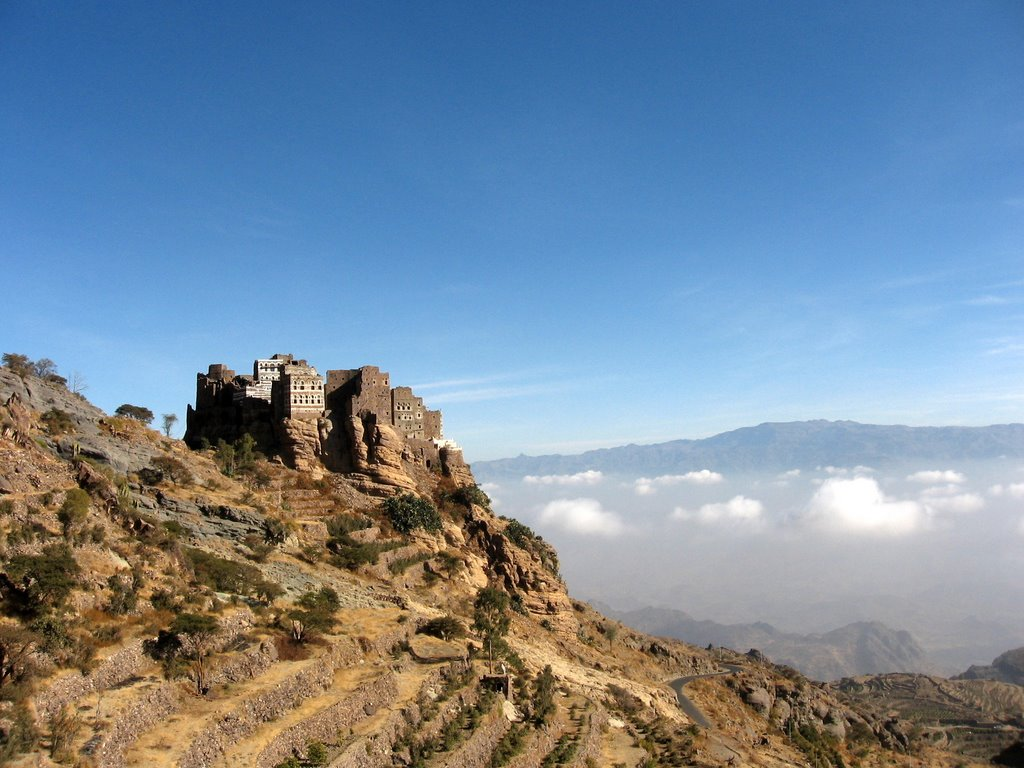
A terraced side of one of the Haraz Mountains in Al Mahwit Governorate, near Jabal An-Nabi Shu'ayb, the highest peak in the Arabian Peninsula, near Sanaa in Yemen

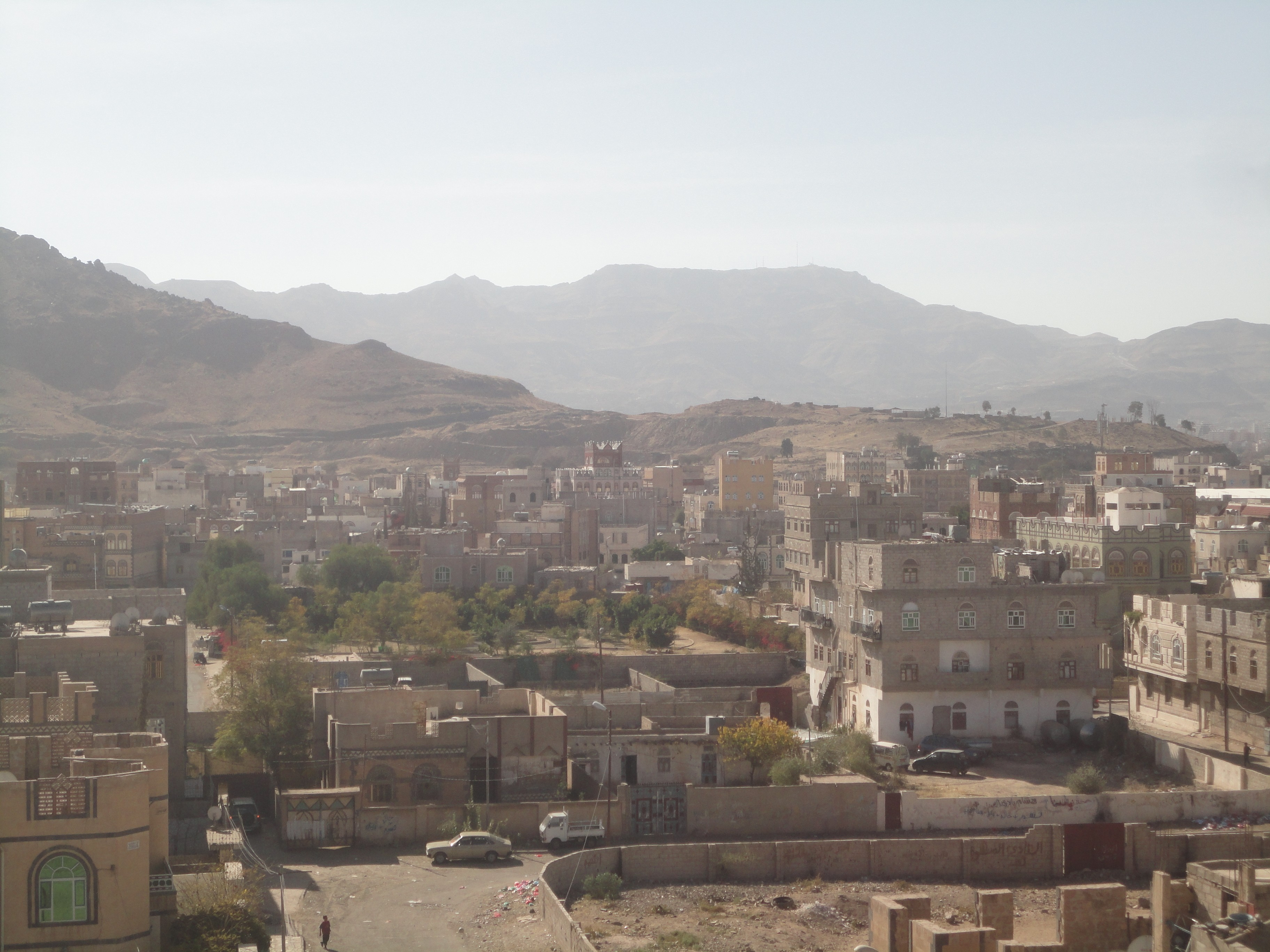
Mountains to the west of southern Sana'a, Yemen. Jabal An-Nabi Shu'ayb is behind the mountain in the background.

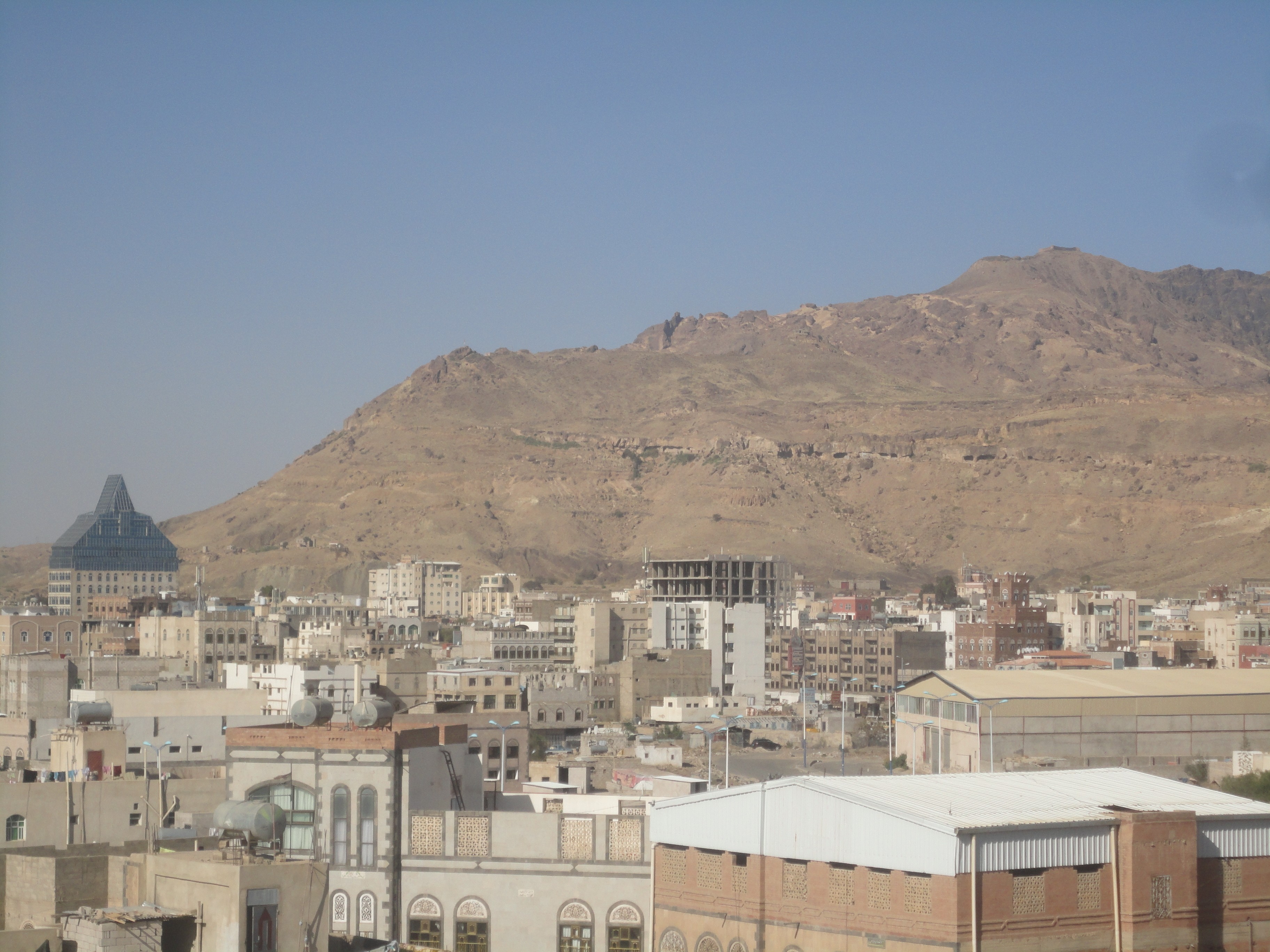
Jabal Nuqm or Jabal Nuqum in the area of Sana'a. Local legend has it that after the death of Noah, his son Shem built the city at the base of this mountain.

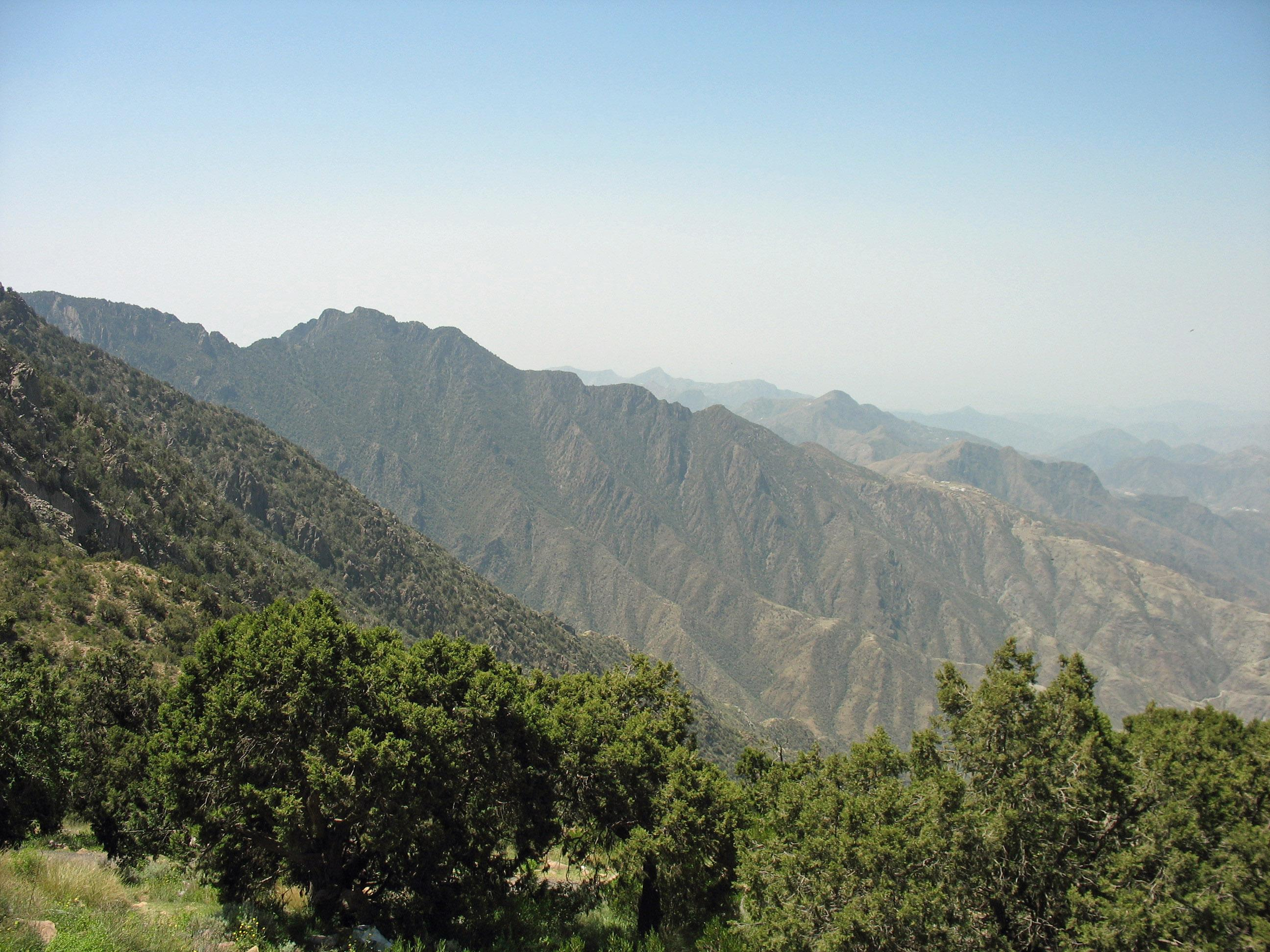
Jabal Sawdah in Saudi Arabia

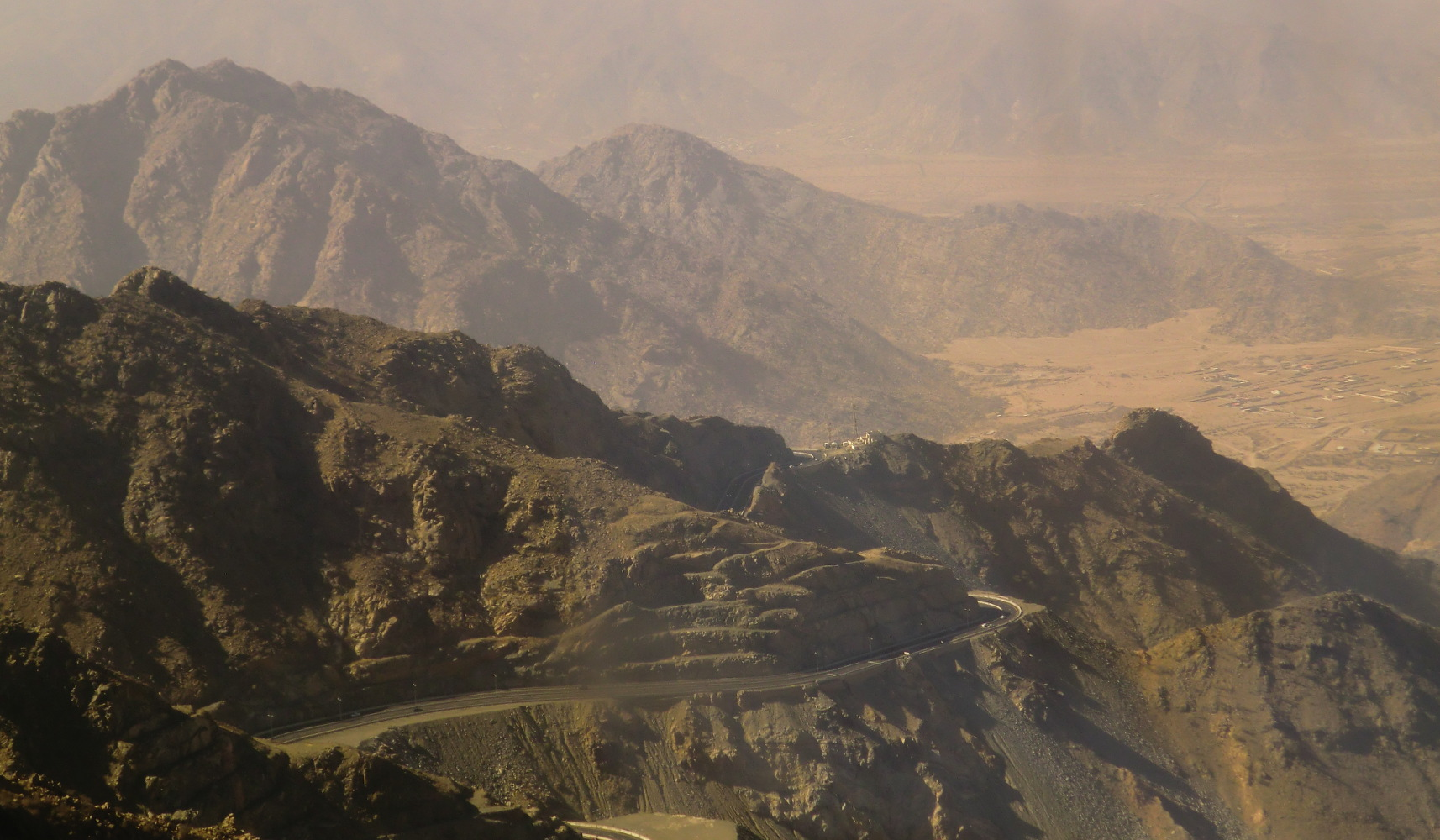
Mountains of Ta'if

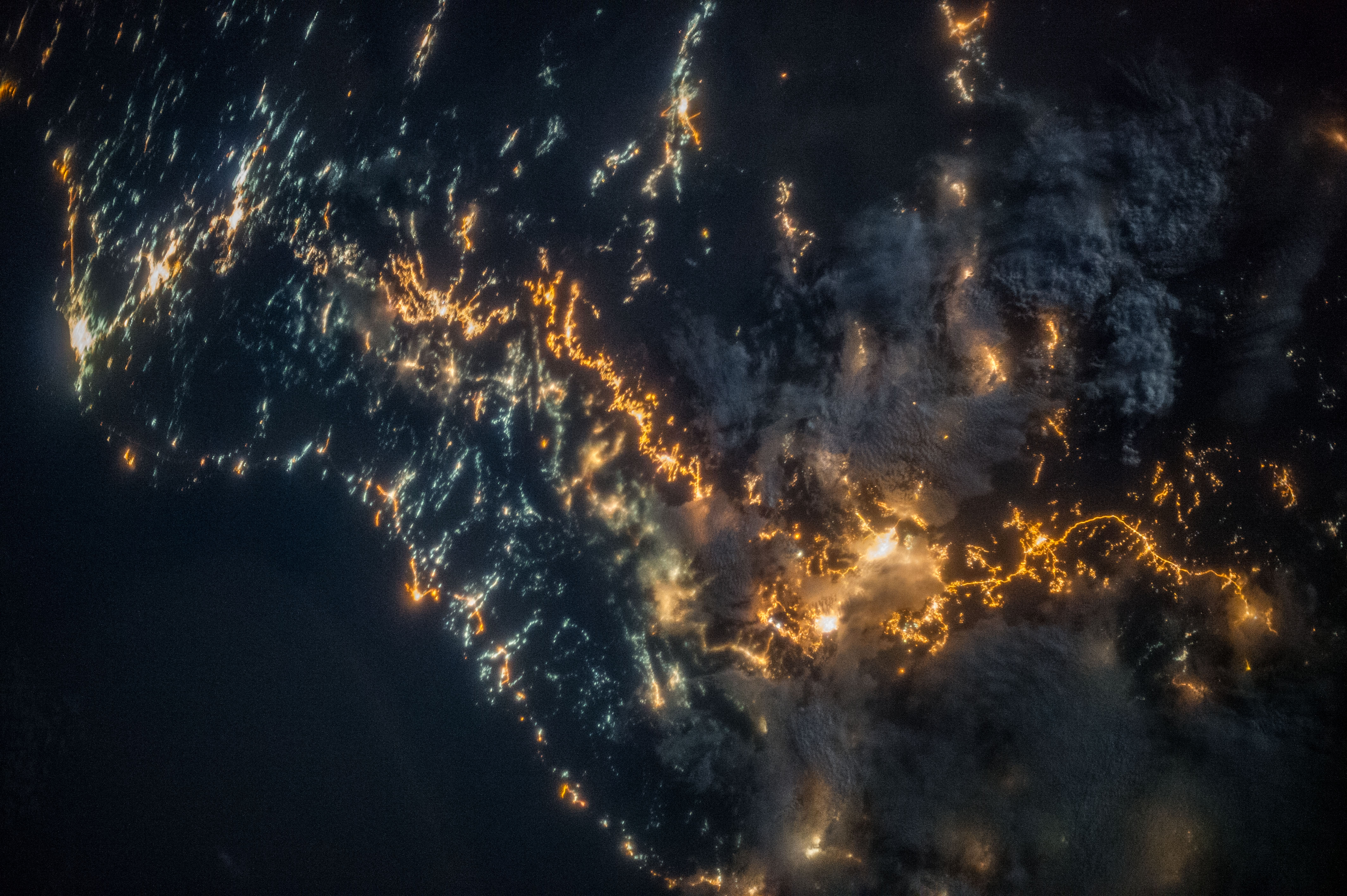
ISS-36 night-time view of southwestern Saudi Arabia

== See also ==
- Hajhir Mountains
- Dhorm Mountain
- South Arabia
  - Southwestern Arabian foothills savanna
- Tihamah
