= 2019–20 Al-Batin F.C. season =

Al-Batin
2019–20 season
- President: Nasser Al-Huwaidi
- Manager: Ridha Jeddi (until 24 September); José Garrido (from 24 September)
- Stadium: Al-Batin Club Stadium
- MS League: 1st (promoted)
- King Cup: Round of 64 (knocked out by Al-Arabi)
- Top goalscorer: League: Hassan Sharahili (16); All: Hassan Sharahili (16)
- All statistics correct as of 20 September 2020.

The 2019–20 season was Al-Batin's 41st year in their existence and their first back season in the MS League. Al-Batin were relegated to the second tier of Saudi football after finishing 15th in the 2018–19 Saudi Pro League. The club participated in the MS League and the King Cup.

The season covered the period from 1 July 2019 to 20 September 2020.

== Players ==
=== Squad information ===
As of 31 August 2019

Note: Flags indicate national team as defined under FIFA eligibility rules; some limited exceptions apply. Players may hold more than one non-FIFA nationality.

No.	Pos.	Nation	Player
1	GK	KSA	Hani Al-Nahedh
2	DF	KSA	Omar Al-Owdah
3	DF	CIV	Lassina Diaby
5	DF	TUN	Mehdi Ressaissi
6	MF	KSA	Abdullah Al-Dossari
7	DF	KSA	Mohanna Waqes (captain)
8	MF	KSA	Dhaifallah Al-Qarni
9	FW	KSA	Hassan Sharahili
10	MF	KSA	Jadaan Mohanna
11	FW	KSA	Yousef Al-Mozairib
12	MF	LBY	Badr Hassan
13	DF	KSA	Muteb Mansour
14	MF	KSA	Maher Othman
15	MF	KSA	Fayhan Al-Mutairi
16	FW	KSA	Fahad Hadl
17	FW	KSA	Ismael Al-Maghrebi

No.	Pos.	Nation	Player
18	MF	KSA	Meshal Al-Enezi
20	MF	KSA	Sultan Al-Shammeri
22	GK	KSA	Mishaal Al-Shammeri
23	DF	TUN	Seddik Majeri (on loan from CA Bizertin)
25	DF	YEM	Hassan Al-Attas
26	GK	KSA	Mazyad Freeh
27	MF	KSA	Abdulmajeed Obaid
31	DF	KSA	Sultan Ghunaiman
33	DF	KSA	Sultan Dawood
50	GK	KSA	Mutlaq Eid
55	DF	KSA	Hamed Al-Sherif
70	MF	KSA	Mohammed Al-Qathami
88	MF	KSA	Abdulaziz Al-Sharid
99	FW	KSA	Mohammed Al-Dhefiri

== Transfers and loans ==
=== Transfers in ===
Entry date	Position	No.	Player	From club	Fee	Ref.
22 July 2019	MF	6	(Saudi Arabia) Abdullah Al-Dossari	(Saudi Arabia) Al-Mujazzal	Free	
22 July 2019	MF	8	(Saudi Arabia) Dhaifallah Al-Qarni	(Saudi Arabia) Al-Fayha	Free	
22 July 2019	FW	17	(Saudi Arabia) Ismael Al-Maghrebi	(Saudi Arabia) Ohod	Free	
22 July 2019	MF	18	(Saudi Arabia) Meshal Al-Enezi	(Saudi Arabia) Al-Khaleej	Free	
22 July 2019	MF	20	(Saudi Arabia) Sultan Al-Shammeri	(Saudi Arabia) Al-Tai	Free	
22 July 2019	DF	25	(Yemen) Hassan Al-Attas	(Saudi Arabia) Jeddah	Free	
22 July 2019	DF	55	(Saudi Arabia) Hamed Al-Sherif	(Saudi Arabia) Al-Orobah	Free	
22 July 2019	MF	70	(Saudi Arabia) Mohammed Al-Qathami	(Saudi Arabia) Al-Wehda	Free	
22 July 2019	MF	88	(Saudi Arabia) Abdulaziz Al-Sharid	(Saudi Arabia) Al-Ain	Free	
26 July 2019	MF	14	(Saudi Arabia) Maher Othman	(Saudi Arabia) Al-Ahli	Free	
26 July 2019	MF	15	(Saudi Arabia) Fayhan Al-Mutairi	(Saudi Arabia) Al-Qaisumah	Free	
26 July 2019	FW	16	(Saudi Arabia) Fahad Hadl	(Saudi Arabia) Al-Qaisumah	Free	
14 August 2019	FW	3	(Ivory Coast) Lassina Diaby	(Saudi Arabia) Al-Khaleej	Free	
14 August 2019	DF	5	(Tunisia) Mehdi Ressaissi	(Saudi Arabia) Najran	Free	
21 August 2019	DF	2	(Saudi Arabia) Omar Al-Owdah	(Saudi Arabia) Al-Raed	Free	
21 August 2019	MF	12	(Libya) Badr Hassan	(Libya) Al Ahli Tripoli	Free	
31 August 2019	GK	1	(Saudi Arabia) Hani Al-Nahedh	(Saudi Arabia) Al-Qaisumah	Free	

=== Loans in ===
Start date	End date	Position	No.	Player	From club	Fee	Ref.
28 August 2019	End of season	DF	23	(Tunisia) Seddik Majeri	(Tunisia) CA Bizertin	None	

=== Transfers out ===
Exit date	Position	No.	Player	To club	Fee	Ref.
20 May 2019	FW	9	(Morocco) Aziz Bouhaddouz	(Germany) Sandhausen	Free	
29 May 2019	MF	12	(Saudi Arabia) Majed Kanabah	(Saudi Arabia) Al-Fateh	Free	
16 June 2019	DF	25	(Saudi Arabia) Sultan Masrahi	(Saudi Arabia) Damac	Free	
28 June 2019	MF	5	(Brazil) Baraka	(Brazil) Vitória	Free	
2 July 2019	GK	83	(Brazil) Adriano Facchini	(Turkey) Giresunspor	Free	
6 July 2019	DF	3	(Saudi Arabia) Bander Nasser	(Saudi Arabia) Al-Fayha	$535,000	
10 July 2019	DF	90	(Brazil) Lucas Tagliapietra	(Portugal) Boavista	Free	
26 July 2019	MF	17	(Saudi Arabia) Raed Al-Ghamdi	(Saudi Arabia) Al-Raed	Free	
5 August 2019	MF	39	(Australia) Osama Malik	(Australia) Perth Glory	Free	
20 August 2019	DF	4	(Saudi Arabia) Bader Al-Nakhli	(Saudi Arabia) Al-Adalah	Free	

== Pre-season ==
30 July 2019 Friendly	Al-Batin (Saudi Arabia)	1–1	(Egypt) Ceramica Cleopatra	Ismailia, Egypt
17:00 EET	Othman

31 July 2019 Friendly	Al-Batin (Saudi Arabia)	1–0	(Egypt) El Qanah	Ismailia, Egypt
17:00 EET	Al-Sharid 55'	Report

3 August 2019 Friendly	Al-Batin (Saudi Arabia)	0–2	(Egypt) Pyramids	Cairo, Egypt
17:00 EET		Report	Bakry; Marey	Stadium: 30 June Stadium

6 August 2019 Friendly	Al-Batin (Saudi Arabia)	1–3	(Saudi Arabia) Al-Ain	Ismailia, Egypt
17:00 EET	Al-Qarni 50'		Nworah 19', 81'; Al-Harthi 31'	Stadium: Mercure Ismailia Stadium

9 August 2019 Friendly	Al-Batin (Saudi Arabia)	3–3	(Egypt) Suez	Ismailia, Egypt
17:00 EET

== Competitions ==
=== Overview ===
Competition	Record							
Competition	G	W	D	L	GF	GA	GD	Win %
Pro League	38	22	10	6	52	28	+24	57.89
King Cup	1	0	0	1	1	2	−1	0.00
Total	39	22	10	7	53	30	+23	56.41

Updated to match played 20 September 2020
Source: Competitions

=== Prince Mohammad bin Salman League ===
==== League table ====
Pos	Team	Pld	W	D	L	GF	GA	GD	Pts	Promotion, qualification or relegation
1	Al-Batin (C, P)	38	22	10	6	52	28	+24	76	Promotion to the Pro League
2	Al-Qadsiah (P)	38	21	12	5	71	38	+33	75	Promotion to the Pro League
3	Al-Ain (P)	38	19	15	4	57	29	+28	72	Promotion to the Pro League
4	Al-Bukayriyah	38	17	13	8	65	41	+24	64	
5	Al-Nahda	38	16	12	10	55	47	+8	60	
6	Ohod	38	15	12	11	51	42	+9	57 (Note: Ohod finished ahead of Al-Jabalain on head-to-head goal difference: Al-Jabalain 1–3 Ohod, Ohod 0–1 Al-Jabalain.)	
7	Al-Jabalain	38	15	12	11	56	39	+17	57	
8	Jeddah	38	15	9	14	49	49	0	54	
9	Al-Thoqbah	38	14	11	13	61	46	+15	53	
10	Al-Tai	38	12	12	14	40	38	+2	48 (Note: Al-Tai finished ahead of Najran on overall goal difference: Al-Tai +2, Najran –2 (Al-Tai 0–2 Najran, Najran 1–3 Al-Tai).)	
11	Najran	38	12	12	14	49	51	−2	48	
12	Al-Shoulla	38	11	14	13	43	44	−1	47	
13	Al-Jeel	38	12	10	16	38	52	−14	46	
14	Al-Kawkab	38	11	12	15	39	47	−8	45	
15	Al-Khaleej	38	10	14	14	45	50	−5	44	
16	Al-Nojoom	38	10	11	17	44	62	−18	41	
17	Al-Mujazzal (R)	38	11	6	21	37	64	−27	39	Relegation to the Second Division
18	Al-Taqadom (R)	38	10	8	20	42	66	−24	38	Relegation to the Second Division
19	Al-Ansar (R)	38	9	8	21	34	62	−28	35	Relegation to the Second Division
20	Hetten (R)	38	8	7	23	47	80	−33	31	Relegation to the Second Division

Updated to match(es) played on 20 September 2020. Source: goalzz.com
Rules for classification: 1) Points; 2) Head-to-head points; 3) Head-to-head goal difference; 4) Total goal difference; 5) Total goals scored; 6) Fair-play points (Note: Head-to-head record is used only after all the matches between the teams in question have been played).
(C) Champions; (P) Promoted; (R) Relegated

==== Results summary ====
Overall								Home						Away					
Pld	W	D	L	GF	GA	GD	Pts	W	D	L	GF	GA	GD	W	D	L	GF	GA	GD
38	22	10	6	52	28	+24	76	14	5	0	31	9	+22	8	5	6	21	19	+2

Last updated: 20 September 2020.

==== Results by round ====
Round	1	2	3	4	5	6	7	8	9	10	11	12	13	14	15	16	17	18	19	20	21	22	23	24	25	26	27	28	29	30	31	32	33	34	35	36	37	38
Ground	A	H	A	H	A	H	A	H	H	A	H	A	A	A	H	A	H	A	H	H	A	H	A	H	A	H	A	A	H	A	H	H	H	A	H	A	H	A
Result	L	W	W	D	D	W	L	D	W	D	W	W	W	L	D	W	W	W	W	D	L	W	D	D	W	W	W	L	W	D	W	W	W	W	W	L	W	D
Position	20	10	5	7	8	4	8	8	7	4	4	5	5	5	5	3	3	2	2	2	3	2	3	4	4	3	2	2	2	2	2	1	1	1	1	1	1	1

Updated to match(es) played on 20 September 2020. Source:
A = Away; H = Home; W = Win; D = Draw; L = Loss

==== Matches ====
All times are local, AST (UTC+3).

Win Draw Loss Postponed

21 August 2019 1	Al-Kawkab	2–0	Al-Batin	Al-Kharj
19:00	Al-Munaif 90+5'; Al-Zahrani 90+6'	Report		Stadium: Al-Shoulla Club Stadium; Referee: Mohammed Al-Hoaish

27 August 2019 2	Al-Batin	1–0	Al-Nahda	Hafar al-Batin
16:15	Diaby 7'	Report		Stadium: Al-Batin Club Stadium; Referee: Mohammed Al-Nuhait

3 September 2019 3	Al-Mujazzal	1–2	Al-Batin	Al Majma'ah
18:55	Al-Ali 53'	Report	Sharahili 68'; Diaby 88'	Stadium: Al Majma'ah Sports City; Referee: Mohammed Al-Buraidi

10 September 2019 4	Al-Batin	0–0	Al-Ain	Hafar al-Batin
18:50		Report		Stadium: Al-Batin Club Stadium; Referee: Ahmed Al-Remeikhany

17 September 2019 5	Al-Jabalain	2–2	Al-Batin	Ha'il
18:55	Carlão 20'; El Okbi 74'	Report	Sharahili 34'; Al-Qarni 72'	Stadium: Prince Abdul Aziz bin Musa'ed Stadium; Referee: Raed Al-Zahrani

24 September 2019 6	Al-Batin	4–1	Al-Nojoom	Hafar al-Batin
18:30	Al-Mozairib 4'; Al-Qarni 28'; Sharahili 34', 82'	Report	Al-Qunayan 45'	Stadium: Al-Batin Club Stadium; Referee: Majed Al-Shamrani

29 September 2019 7	Al-Thoqbah	2–1	Al-Batin	Khobar
18:10	Al-Nakhli 5'; Sufyani 64'	Report	Majeri 13'	Stadium: Prince Saud bin Jalawi Stadium; Referee: Maitham Al-Daleem

5 October 2019 8	Al-Batin	1–1	Ohod	Hafar al-Batin
18:15	Ressaissi 14'	Report	Al-Motawaa 89'	Stadium: Al-Batin Club Stadium; Referee: Abdullah Al-Nuhait

18 October 2019 9	Al-Batin	2–1	Al-Tai	Hafar al-Batin
18:10	Al-Maghrebi 34'; Diaby 67'	Report	Al-Munee 90+1'	Stadium: Al-Batin Club Stadium; Referee: Mohammed Al-Smail

22 October 2019 10	Al-Shoulla	0–0	Al-Batin	Riyadh
18:00		Report		Stadium: Reserve Stadium in Prince Faisal bin Fahd Stadium; Referee: Mohammed Al-Hoaish

29 October 2019 11	Al-Batin	3–1	Najran	Hafar al-Batin
17:55	Al-Qarni 31'; Al-Sharid 77'; Sharahili 88'	Report	Coppetti 53'	Stadium: Al-Batin Club Stadium; Referee: Faisal Al-Balawi

21 November 2019 13	Hetten	1–2	Al-Batin	Jizan
18:15	Pingo 72'	Report	Sharahili 61'; Diaby 74'	Stadium: King Faisal Sport City Stadium; Referee: Mohammed Al-Smail

27 November 2019 14	Al-Ansar	1–0	Al-Batin	Medina
18:15	Al-Mutairi 76'	Report		Stadium: Al-Ansar Club Stadium; Referee: Abdullah Al-Kharboush

7 December 2019 12	Al-Khaleej	0–2	Al-Batin	Khobar
18:50		Report	Al-Owdah 80'; Mohsen 87'	Stadium: Prince Saud bin Jalawi Stadium; Referee: Sultan Al-Harbi

10 December 2019 16	Al-Jeel	0–2	Al-Batin	Al-Hasa
17:35		Report	Mohsen 75'; Sharahili 82'	Stadium: Prince Abdullah bin Jalawi Stadium; Referee: Abdullah Al-Awidan

25 December 2019 18	Al-Taqadom	0–1	Al-Batin	Unaizah
15:10		Report	Diaby 90'	Stadium: Al-Najma Club Stadium; Referee: Mohammed Al-Hoaish

31 December 2019 15	Al-Batin	1–1	Jeddah	Hafar al-Batin
15:10	Sharahili 43'	Report	Sory 80'	Stadium: Al-Batin Club Stadium; Referee: Mohammed Al-Buraidi

7 January 2020 19	Al-Batin	3–1	Al-Bukayriyah	Hafar al-Batin
15:15	Odah 2' (o.g.); Al-Mozairib 12'; Diaby 81'	Report	Pato 4'	Stadium: Al-Batin Club Stadium; Referee: Mohammed Al-Qarni

11 January 2020 17	Al-Batin	1–0	Al-Qadsiah	Hafar al-Batin
17:45	Al-Dawsari 40' (o.g.)	Report		Stadium: Al-Batin Club Stadium; Referee: Raed Al-Zahrani

15 January 2020 20	Al-Batin	1–1	Al-Kawkab	Hafar al-Batin
15:20	Al-Mozairib 55'	Report	Al-Enezi 43'	Stadium: Al-Batin Club Stadium; Referee: Abdulsamad Bakri

22 January 2020 21	Al-Nahda	2–0	Al-Batin	Dammam
17:55	Traoré 3'; Jaziri 37'	Report		Stadium: Prince Fahd bin Salman Stadium; Referee: Khaled Salwi

29 January 2020 22	Al-Batin	2–0	Al-Mujazzal	Hafar al-Batin
15:30	Sharahili 10'; Al-Sharid 20'	Report		Stadium: Al-Batin Club Stadium; Referee: Abdullah Dhafer

4 February 2020 23	Al-Ain	0–0	Al-Batin	Al Bahah
16:05		Report		Stadium: King Saud Sport City Stadium; Referee: Majed Al-Shamrani

11 February 2020 24	Al-Batin	0–0	Al-Jabalain	Hafar al-Batin
15:40		Report		Stadium: Al-Batin Club Stadium; Referee: Mohammed Al-Hoaish

18 February 2020 25	Al-Nojoom	1–3	Al-Batin	Al-Hasa
18:15	Al-Ibrahim 16'	Report	Sharahili 20', 69'; Al-Mozairib 61'	Stadium: Prince Abdullah bin Jalawi Stadium; Referee: Sultan Okairi

25 February 2020 26	Al-Batin	2–0	Al-Thoqbah	Hafar al-Batin
17:05	Al-Mozairib 47'; Al-Qarni 85'	Report		Stadium: Al-Batin Club Stadium; Referee: Khaled Al-Teris

3 March 2020 27	Ohod	0–1	Al-Batin	Medina
16:15		Report	Sharahili 63'	Stadium: Prince Mohammed bin Abdul Aziz Stadium; Referee: Majed Al-Shamrani

10 March 2020 28	Al-Tai	1–0	Al-Batin	Ha'il
16:05	Dudu 32' (pen.)	Report		Stadium: Prince Abdul Aziz bin Musa'ed Stadium; Referee: Sultan Al-Harbi

6 August 2020 29	Al-Batin	3–1	Al-Shoulla	Hafar al-Batin
19:20	Al-Qarni 48', 71' (pen.); Sharahili 63'	Report	Sami 28'	Stadium: Al-Batin Club Stadium; Referee: Shukri Al-Hanfoush

11 August 2020 30	Najran	1–1	Al-Batin	Najran
19:10	Al Haidar 10'	Report	Al-Qarni 39' (pen.)	Stadium: Najran Sport City Stadium; Referee: Khaled Al-Tires

16 August 2020 31	Al-Batin	1–0	Al-Khaleej	Hafar al-Batin
19:10	Ressaissi 78'	Report		Stadium: Al-Batin Club Stadium; Referee: Mohammed Al-Nuhait

22 August 2020 32	Al-Batin	1–0	Hetten	Hafar al-Batin
19:05	Al-Shammari 55'	Report		Stadium: Al-Batin Club Stadium; Referee: Ahmed Al-Remeikhany

26 August 2020 33	Al-Batin	2–0	Al-Ansar	Hafar al-Batin
19:00	Jahaf 49' (o.g.); Sharahili 90' (pen.)	Report		Stadium: Al-Batin Club Stadium; Referee: Mohammed Al-Hoaish

31 August 2020 34	Jeddah	1–2	Al-Batin	Jeddah
19:20	Omar 8'	Report	Sharahili 22'; Ressaissi 50'	Stadium: Reserve Stadium in King Abdullah Sports City; Referee: Faisal Al-Blwi

6 September 2020 35	Al-Batin	2–1	Al-Jeel	Hafar al-Batin
18:50	Al-Shammari 65'; Al-Dossari 85'	Report	Al-Saeed 35'	Stadium: Al-Batin Club Stadium; Referee: Turki Al-Khudhayr

10 September 2020 36	Al-Qadsiah	3–1	Al-Batin	Khobar
20:35	Al-Amri 6'; Stanley 27'; Al-Shangeati 43'	Report	Sharahili 59'	Stadium: Prince Saud bin Jalawi Stadium; Referee: Mohammed Al-Smail

15 September 2020 37	Al-Batin	1–0	Al-Taqadom	Hafar al-Batin
20:30	Al-Maghrebi 90+4'	Report		Stadium: Al-Batin Club Stadium; Referee: Mohammed Al-Buraidi

20 September 2020 38	Al-Bukayriyah	1–1	Al-Batin	Al Bukayriyah
20:30	Al-Harbi 26'	Report	Al-Dossari 68'	Stadium: Al-Bukayriyah Club Stadium; Referee: Raed Al-Zahrani

=== King Cup ===
8 November 2019 Round of 64	Al-Arabi	2–1	Al-Batin	Unaizah
18:00	Al-Noman 31'; Mubarak 75'	Report	Al-Mozairib 51'; Obaid (yellow card) 55'	Stadium: Al-Najma Club Stadium; Referee: Mishari Howaidi

== Statistics ==
=== Appearances ===
Last updated on 20 September 2020.

No.	Pos	Nat	Player	Total		Pro League		King Cup	
No.	Pos	Nat	Player	Apps	Goals	Apps	Goals	Apps	Goals
Goalkeepers
1	GK	(Saudi Arabia) KSA	Hani Al-Nahedh	2	0	0+1	0	1	0
22	GK	(Saudi Arabia) KSA	Mishaal Al-Shammeri	0	0	0	0	0	0
26	GK	(Saudi Arabia) KSA	Mazyad Freeh	38	0	38	0	0	0
Defenders
2	DF	(Saudi Arabia) KSA	Omar Al-Owdah	23	1	23	1	0	0
5	DF	(Tunisia) TUN	Mehdi Ressaissi	37	3	37	3	0	0
7	DF	(Saudi Arabia) KSA	Mohanna Waqes	37	0	37	0	0	0
13	DF	(Saudi Arabia) KSA	Muteb Mansour	1	0	0	0	1	0
23	DF	(Tunisia) TUN	Seddik Majeri	28	1	28	1	0	0
25	DF	(Yemen) YEM	Hassan Al-Attas	11	0	10	0	0+1	0
31	DF	(Saudi Arabia) KSA	Sultan Ghunaiman	9	0	6+3	0	0	0
33	DF	(Saudi Arabia) KSA	Sultan Dawood	2	0	0+1	0	1	0
55	DF	(Saudi Arabia) KSA	Hamed Al-Sherif	15	0	9+5	0	1	0
Midfielders
6	MF	(Saudi Arabia) KSA	Abdullah Al-Dossari	16	2	5+11	2	0	0
8	MF	(Saudi Arabia) KSA	Dhaifallah Al-Qarni	34	7	31+3	7	0	0
10	MF	(Saudi Arabia) KSA	Jadaan Mohanna	21	0	12+9	0	0	0
12	MF	(Libya) LBY	Badr Hassan	31	0	29+1	0	1	0
14	MF	(Saudi Arabia) KSA	Maher Othman	10	0	8+2	0	0	0
15	MF	(Saudi Arabia) KSA	Fayhan Al-Mutairi	14	0	8+5	0	1	0
18	MF	(Saudi Arabia) KSA	Meshal Al-Enezi	6	0	3+2	0	0+1	0
20	MF	(Saudi Arabia) KSA	Sultan Al-Shammeri	24	0	18+6	0	0	0
27	MF	(Saudi Arabia) KSA	Abdulmajeed Obaid	13	0	6+6	0	1	0
36	MF	(Saudi Arabia) KSA	Bassam Al-Hurayji	1	0	0+1	0	0	0
70	MF	(Saudi Arabia) KSA	Mohammed Al-Qathami	12	0	8+3	0	1	0
88	MF	(Saudi Arabia) KSA	Abdulaziz Al-Sharid	35	2	25+10	2	0	0
99	MF	(Saudi Arabia) KSA	Mohammed Al-Dhefiri	16	2	2+13	2	1	0
Forwards
3	FW	(Ivory Coast) CIV	Lassina Diaby	30	6	28+2	6	0	0
9	FW	(Saudi Arabia) KSA	Hassan Sharahili	34	16	22+11	16	0+1	0
11	FW	(Saudi Arabia) KSA	Yousef Al-Mozairib	31	6	19+11	5	1	1
16	FW	(Saudi Arabia) KSA	Fahad Hadl	16	2	3+12	2	1	0
17	FW	(Saudi Arabia) KSA	Ismael Al-Maghrebi	10	2	3+7	2	0	0

=== Goalscorers ===
Rank	No.	Pos	Nat	Name	MS League	King Cup	Total
1	9	FW	(Saudi Arabia)	Hassan Sharahili	16	0	16
2	8	MF	(Saudi Arabia)	Dhaifallah Al-Qarni	7	0	7
3	3	FW	(Ivory Coast)	Lassina Diaby	6	0	6
3	11	FW	(Saudi Arabia)	Yousef Al-Mozairib	5	1	6
5	5	DF	(Tunisia)	Mehdi Ressaissi	3	0	3
6	6	MF	(Saudi Arabia)	Abdullah Al-Dossari	2	0	2
6	16	FW	(Saudi Arabia)	Fahad Hadl	2	0	2
6	17	FW	(Saudi Arabia)	Ismael Al-Maghrebi	2	0	2
6	88	MF	(Saudi Arabia)	Abdulaziz Al-Sharid	2	0	2
6	99	MF	(Saudi Arabia)	Mohammed Al-Dhefiri	2	0	2
11	2	DF	(Saudi Arabia)	Omar Al-Owdah	1	0	1
11	23	DF	(Tunisia)	Seddik Majeri	1	0	1
Own goal					3	0	3
Total					52	1	53

Last Updated: 20 September 2020

=== Clean sheets ===
Rank	No.	Pos	Nat	Name	MS League	King Cup	Total
1	26	GK	(Saudi Arabia)	Mazyad Freeh	16	0	16
Total					16	0	16

Last Updated: 15 September 2020
