= 2020–21 Al-Batin FC season =

Al-Batin
2020–21 season
- President: Nasser Al-Huwaidi
- Manager: José Garrido (until 20 March); Aleksandar Veselinović (from 24 March)
- Stadium: Al-Batin Club Stadium
- SPL: 12th
- King Cup: Quarter-finals (knocked out by Al-Faisaly)
- Top goalscorer: League: Fábio Abreu (17); All: Fábio Abreu (18)
- Highest home attendance: 968 (vs. Damac, 26 May 2021)
- Lowest home attendance: 342 (vs. Al-Ettifaq, 19 May 2021)
- Average home league attendance: 655
Home colours	Away colours
- All statistics correct as of 30 May 2021.

The 2020–21 season was Al-Batin's 42nd year in their existence and the first season back in the top flight of Saudi Arabian football after winning the MS League last season. The club participated in the Pro League and the King Cup.

The season covered the period from 22 September 2020 to 30 June 2021.

== Players ==
=== Squad information ===
As of 1 February 2021

Note: Flags indicate national team as defined under FIFA eligibility rules; some limited exceptions apply. Players may hold more than one non-FIFA nationality.

No.	Pos.	Nation	Player
1	GK	KSA	Hani Al-Nahedh
2	DF	KSA	Omar Al-Owdah
3	FW	KSA	Hassan Sharahili
4	DF	NED	Xandro Schenk
5	DF	BRA	Renato Chaves
6	MF	KSA	Abdulaziz Damdam
7	FW	KSA	Yousef Al-Mozairib
8	MF	KSA	Dhaifallah Al-Qarni
9	FW	ANG	Fábio Abreu
10	MF	NED	Youssef El Jebli
11	MF	NED	Mohamed Rayhi
12	DF	KSA	Hassan Raghfawi
13	DF	KSA	Naif Almas (on loan from Al-Nassr)
14	FW	KSA	Saleh Al Abbas (on loan from Al-Nassr)
15	FW	KSA	Mohammed Al-Dhefiri
16	FW	KSA	Fahad Hadl

No.	Pos.	Nation	Player
17	MF	KSA	Bassam Al-Hurayji
18	MF	KSA	Abdulmalek Al-Shammeri (on loan from Al-Shabab)
19	MF	KSA	Mohammed Fraih
21	MF	KSA	Zakaria Sami
22	GK	KSA	Mishaal Al-Shammeri
25	GK	URU	Martín Campaña
26	GK	KSA	Mazyad Freeh (captain)
27	MF	KSA	Abdulmajeed Obaid
29	DF	KSA	Bader Nasser
37	MF	KSA	Turki Al-Dhefiri
50	DF	KSA	Saad Al Khairi (on loan from Al-Ettifaq)
55	DF	KSA	Masoud Al-Rubaie
56	FW	KSA	Abdulrahman Saad
70	MF	KSA	Rakan Al-Shamlan
88	MF	TTO	Khaleem Hyland

=== Out on loan ===
Note: Flags indicate national team as defined under FIFA eligibility rules; some limited exceptions apply. Players may hold more than one non-FIFA nationality.

No.	Pos.	Nation	Player
33	DF	KSA	Sultan Al-Shammeri (at Al-Nojoom until 30 June 2021)

== Transfers and loans ==
=== Transfers in ===
Entry date	Position	No.	Player	From club	Fee	Ref.
23 September 2020	MF	10	(Netherlands) Youssef El Jebli	(Saudi Arabia) Al-Faisaly	$107,000	
23 September 2020	MF	88	(Trinidad and Tobago) Khaleem Hyland	(Saudi Arabia) Al-Faisaly	Free	
24 September 2020	GK	25	(Uruguay) Martín Campaña	(Argentina) Independiente	Free	
24 September 2020	DF	12	(Saudi Arabia) Hassan Raghfawi	(Saudi Arabia) Al-Shabab	Undisclosed	
24 September 2020	MF	6	(Saudi Arabia) Abdulaziz Damdam	(Saudi Arabia) Al-Mujazzal	Free	
25 September 2020	MF	21	(Saudi Arabia) Zakaria Sami	(Saudi Arabia) Al-Shoulla	Free	
1 October 2020	MF	11	(Netherlands) Mohamed Rayhi	(Netherlands) Sparta Rotterdam	Undisclosed	
3 October 2020	DF	4	(Netherlands) Xandro Schenk	(Netherlands) Twente	Free	
5 October 2020	DF	5	(Brazil) Renato Chaves	(Saudi Arabia) Al-Wehda	Free	
8 October 2020	MF	70	(Saudi Arabia) Rakan Al-Shamlan	(Saudi Arabia) Al-Nassr	Undisclosed	
12 October 2020	FW	9	(Angola) Fábio Abreu	(Portugal) Moreirense	Undisclosed	
25 October 2020	DF	55	(Saudi Arabia) Masoud Al-Rubaie	(Saudi Arabia) Al-Akhdoud	Free	

=== Loans in ===
Start date	End date	Position	No.	Player	From club	Fee	Ref.
25 September 2020	End of season	DF	50	(Saudi Arabia) Saad Al Khairi	(Saudi Arabia) Al-Ettifaq	None	
2 October 2020	End of season	MF	18	(Saudi Arabia) Abdulmalek Al-Shammeri	(Saudi Arabia) Al-Shabab	None	
7 October 2020	End of season	FW	14	(Saudi Arabia) Saleh Al Abbas	(Saudi Arabia) Al-Nassr	$345,000	
12 October 2020	End of season	DF	13	(Saudi Arabia) Naif Almas	(Saudi Arabia) Al-Nassr	None	

=== Transfers out ===
Exit date	Position	No.	Player	To club	Fee	Ref.
22 September 2020	DF	23	(Tunisia) Seddik Majeri	(Tunisia) CA Bizertin	End of loan	
25 September 2020	MF	88	(Saudi Arabia) Abdulaziz Al-Sharid	(Saudi Arabia) Al-Faisaly	Free	
27 September 2020	MF	18	(Saudi Arabia) Meshal Al-Enezi	(Saudi Arabia) Arar	Free	
30 September 2020	DF	5	(Tunisia) Mehdi Ressaissi	(Saudi Arabia) Al-Bukayriyah	Free	
1 October 2020	MF	12	(Libya) Bader Hassan	(Saudi Arabia) Al-Bukayriyah	Free	
4 October 2020	DF	7	(Saudi Arabia) Mohanna Waqes	(Saudi Arabia) Al-Tai	Free	
5 October 2020	MF	6	(Saudi Arabia) Abdullah Al-Dossari	(Saudi Arabia) Al-Fayha	Free	
5 October 2020	MF	20	(Saudi Arabia) Sultan Al-Shammeri	(Saudi Arabia) Al-Jabalain	Free	
6 October 2020	DF	31	(Saudi Arabia) Sultan Ghunaiman	(Saudi Arabia) Al-Jabalain	Free	
7 October 2020	DF	55	(Saudi Arabia) Hamed Al-Sherif	(Saudi Arabia) Al-Bukayriyah	Free	
21 October 2020	DF	13	(Saudi Arabia) Muteb Mansour	(Saudi Arabia) Al-Orobah	Free	
1 November 2020	FW	17	(Saudi Arabia) Ismael Al-Maghrebi	(Saudi Arabia) Al-Bukayriyah	Free	

=== Loans out ===
Start date	End date	Position	No.	Player	To club	Fee	Ref.
12 October 2020	End of season	DF	33	(Saudi Arabia) Sultan Al-Shammeri	(Saudi Arabia) Al-Nojoom	None	

== Pre-season ==
9 October 2020 Friendly	Al-Ettifaq (Saudi Arabia)	1–3	(Saudi Arabia) Al-Batin	Dammam, Saudi Arabia
18:15 AST	Al-Kwikbi 15', 73'; Al-Hazaa 68'	Report	Sharahili 62'	Stadium: Al-Ettifaq Club Stadium

11 October 2020 Friendly	Al-Qadsiah (Saudi Arabia)	1–2	(Saudi Arabia) Al-Batin	Khobar, Saudi Arabia
18:15 AST	Andria	Report	Sharahili 29'; Al-Shammeri 44'	Stadium: Al-Qadsiah Club Stadium

== Competitions ==
=== Overview ===
Competition	Record							
Competition	G	W	D	L	GF	GA	GD	Win %
Pro League	30	9	9	12	43	55	−12	30.00
King Cup	2	1	0	1	4	2	+2	50.00
Total	32	10	9	13	47	57	−10	31.25

Updated to match played 30 May 2021
Source: Competitions

=== Pro League ===
==== League table ====
Pos	Team	Pld	W	D	L	GF	GA	GD	Pts	Qualification or relegation
10	Al-Raed	30	10	6	14	44	47	−3	36 (Note: Positions determined by head-to-head points: Al-Faisaly: 16 pts; Al-Raed: 15 pts; Damac: 13 pts; Al-Batin: 12 pts; Abha: 3 pts.)	
11	Damac	30	9	9	12	43	48	−5	36	
12	Al-Batin	30	9	9	12	43	55	−12	36	
13	Abha	30	10	6	14	42	50	−8	36	
14	Al-Qadsiah (R)	30	8	11	11	41	47	−6	35	Relegation to MS League

Source: spl.com source=إحصائيات رابطة دوري المحترفين السعودي 2020-2021
Rules for classification: 1) Points; 2) Head-to-head points; 3) Head-to-head goal difference; 4) Total goal difference; 5) Total goals scored; 6) Fair-play points (Note: Head-to-head record is used only after all the matches between the teams in question have been played).
(R) Relegated

==== Results summary ====
Overall								Home						Away					
Pld	W	D	L	GF	GA	GD	Pts	W	D	L	GF	GA	GD	W	D	L	GF	GA	GD
30	9	9	12	43	55	−12	36	5	3	7	21	24	−3	4	6	5	22	31	−9

Last updated: 30 May 2021.
Source: spl.com.sa

==== Results by round ====
Round	1	2	3	4	5	6	7	8	9	10	11	12	13	14	15	16	17	18	19	20	21	22	23	24	25	26	27	28	29	30
Ground	H	A	H	H	A	A	H	A	H	A	H	H	A	A	H	A	H	A	A	H	H	A	H	A	H	A	A	H	H	A
Result	L	L	W	W	D	L	D	W	L	L	L	D	D	L	W	D	L	W	W	D	W	D	L	L	L	D	D	W	L	W
Position	15	15	13	7	8	9	11	7	10	11	13	14	13	13	12	13	14	13	13	12	10	10	11	13	13	13	13	13	14	12

Updated to match(es) played on 30 May 2021. Source: spl.com.sa
A = Away; H = Home; W = Win; D = Draw; L = Loss

==== Matches ====
All times are local, AST (UTC+3).

Win Draw Loss Postponed

18 October 2020 1	Al-Batin	0–1	Al-Ahli	Hafar al-Batin
18:00	Al Khairi (yellow card) 44'; Al-Shammeri (yellow card) 90+5'	Report	Al-Moasher 18'; Mendash (yellow card) 24'; Hassoun (yellow card) 36'; Fettouhi (yellow card) 45+3'	Stadium: Al-Batin Club Stadium; Attendance: 0 Referee: Sultan Al-Harbi

23 October 2020 2	Al-Faisaly	2–1	Al-Batin	Al Majma'ah
19:55	Al-Anezi (yellow card) 17'; Tavares 29'; Daghriri (yellow card) 61'; Al-Saiari 75'	Report	Raghfawi (yellow card) 13'; Sharahili 46'; Chaves (yellow card) 90+3'	Stadium: Al Majma'ah Sports City; Attendance: 0 Referee: Shukri Al-Hanfoush

29 October 2020 3	Al-Batin	2–1	Al-Raed	Hafar al-Batin
17:50	Abreu 39'; Al-Shammeri 81'; Hyland (yellow card) 87'	Report	El Berkaoui 2'; Djoum (yellow card) 28' (yellow-red card) 48'; Daoudi (yellow card) 37'; Al-Farhan (yellow card) 61'; Nikolić (yellow card) 87'	Stadium: Al-Batin Club Stadium; Attendance: 0 Referee: Khaled Salwi

6 November 2020 4	Al-Batin	3–0	Abha	Hafar al-Batin
17:45	Schenk (yellow card) 52'; El Jebli 81', 90+5'; Abreu 87'	Report	Al Hamsal (yellow card) 22'; Bguir (yellow card) 53'	Stadium: Al-Batin Club Stadium; Attendance: 0 Referee: Mohammed Al-Smail

23 November 2020 5	Al-Qadsiah	2–2	Al-Batin	Dammam
17:25	Williams (yellow card) 21'; Al-Amri 26' (pen.), (yellow card) 64'; Al-Najar (red card) 51'; Al-Yami 71'	Report	Rayhi 2'; Sami (yellow card) 11'; El Jebli (red card) 51'; Sharahili 80'; Hyland (yellow card) 90+3'	Stadium: Prince Mohamed bin Fahd Stadium; Attendance: 0 Referee: Abdullah Al-Harbi

29 November 2020 6	Al-Wehda	3–2	Al-Batin	Mecca
18:10	Petratos 20' (pen.), 54', 86'; Anselmo (yellow card) 33'; Botía (yellow card) 34'; Pedrão (yellow card) 90+5'	Report	Abreu 4', 90'; Chaves (yellow card) 25'; Al Khairi (yellow card) 63'; Hyland (yellow card) 87'	Stadium: King Abdul Aziz Stadium; Attendance: 0 Referee: Faisal Al-Blwi

5 December 2020 7	Al-Batin	1–1	Al-Taawoun	Hafar al-Batin
17:35	Abreu 3', (yellow card) 45'; Chaves (yellow card) 84'; Campaña (yellow card) 90+1'	Report	Barnawi (yellow card) 40'; Al-Mousa (yellow card) 68'; Al-Nabit 90+3'	Stadium: Al-Batin Club Stadium; Attendance: 0 Referee: Shukri Al-Hanfoush

12 December 2020 8	Al-Fateh	1–2	Al-Batin	Hofuf
17:30	Saâdane (yellow card) 31'; Jovanović 47'; Koval (yellow card) 90+11'	Report	Al-Shamlan 4', (yellow card) 22'; Schenk (yellow card) 37'; Al-Qarni (yellow card) 39'; Rayhi 45+6'; Chaves (yellow card) 50'; El Jebli (yellow card) 90+11'	Stadium: Prince Abdullah bin Jalawi Stadium; Attendance: 0 Referee: Ahmad Al-Rumaikhani

21 December 2020 9	Al-Batin	1–2	Al-Nassr	Hafar al-Batin
15:10	Al-Owdah (yellow card) 72'; Abreu 90+4'	Report	Maicon (yellow card) 25'; K. Al-Ghannam 86'; Amrabat 90+1' (pen.)	Stadium: Al-Batin Club Stadium; Attendance: 0 Referee: Sultan Al-Harbi

26 December 2020 10	Al-Shabab	3–1	Al-Batin	Riyadh
15:15	Banega (yellow card) 12'; Martins 18'; Al-Abed 48'; Guanca 78'	Report	Abreu 71'	Stadium: Prince Khalid bin Sultan Stadium; Attendance: 0 Referee: Turki Al-Khudhayr

31 December 2020 11	Al-Batin	1–2	Al-Ittihad	Hafar al-Batin
15:10	Chaves (yellow card) 64'; Abreu 90+3'	Report	Al-Malki (yellow card) 33'; Romarinho 54', 81', (yellow card) 78'; Camara (yellow card) 85'; Hawsawi (yellow card) 90+2'	Stadium: Al-Batin Club Stadium; Attendance: 0 Referee: Abdullah Al-Harbi

8 January 2021 12	Al-Batin	2–2	Al-Hilal	Hafar al-Batin
15:20	Chaves (yellow card) 26', (goal) 61'; El Jebli 35'; Al-Qarni (yellow card) 82'	Report	Al-Mufarrij (yellow card) 18'; Kanno 25', (yellow card) 39'; Gomis 43'; Bahebri (yellow card) 90+7'	Stadium: Al-Batin Club Stadium; Attendance: 0 Referee: Ahmad Al-Rumaikhani

14 January 2021 13	Al-Ettifaq	1–1	Al-Batin	Dammam
17:45	Azaro 38'; Kiss (yellow card) 60'; Mahnashi (yellow card) 83'	Report	Abreu 90+9' (pen.)	Stadium: Prince Mohamed bin Fahd Stadium; Attendance: 0 Referee: Khaled Salwi

20 January 2021 14	Damac	2–0	Al-Batin	Abha
15:55	Zelaya 45+6' (pen.), 68' (pen.); Al-Nakhli (yellow card) 59' (yellow-red card) 79'	Report	Raghfawi (yellow card) 14' (yellow-red card) 20'; Al-Shammeri (yellow card) 39'; El Jebli (yellow card) 60'; Chaves (yellow card) 84'	Stadium: Prince Sultan bin Abdul Aziz Stadium; Attendance: 0 Referee: Mohammed Al-Hoaish

26 January 2021 15	Al-Batin	2–1	Al-Ain	Hafar al-Batin
15:30	Sami (yellow card) 30'; Al-Sohaymi 58' (o.g.); Abreu 75'; Schenk (yellow card) 90+3'; Al Khairi (yellow card) 90+5'	Report	Al-Harbi (yellow card) 16'; Bradarić (yellow card) 38'; Juanpi 90+4'	Stadium: Al-Batin Club Stadium; Attendance: 0 Referee: Turki Al-Khudhayr

31 January 2021 16	Al-Ahli	2–2	Al-Batin	Jeddah
20:10	Hawsawi 11'; Al-Moasher 28' (pen.); Al-Qeed (yellow card) 90+1'; Hassoun (yellow card) 90+4'	Report	Al Abbas 16', 43'; Sami (yellow card) 70'; El Jebli (yellow card) 90+3'	Stadium: King Abdullah Sports City Reserve Stadium; Attendance: 0 Referee: King Abdullah Sports City

5 February 2021 17	Al-Batin	0–2	Al-Faisaly	Hafar al-Batin
15:40	Sami (yellow card) 56'	Report	Tavares 6', 23'; Merkel (yellow card) 29'; Ashraf (yellow card) 64'	Stadium: Al-Batin Club Stadium; Attendance: 0 Referee: Sami Al-Jires

12 February 2021 18	Al-Raed	1–2	Al-Batin	Buraidah
18:30	Djoum (yellow card) 20'; Al-Zain 81'; Al-Fahad (yellow card) 90+4'; Mustafa (yellow card) 90+4'	Report	Baalghyth 47' (o.g.); Al-Mozairib 59', (yellow card) 75'; Al Khairi (yellow card) 89'; Al-Dhafiri (yellow card) 90+5'	Stadium: King Abdullah Sport City Stadium; Attendance: 0 Referee: Raed Al-Zahrani

17 February 2021 19	Abha	1–2	Al-Batin	Abha
16:05	Strandberg 39'; Tatar (yellow card) 71'; Bguir (yellow card) 90+7'	Report	Abreu 26'; Al-Shamlan 50'; Campaña (yellow card) 89'; Al-Hurayji (yellow card) 90+6'	Stadium: Prince Sultan bin Abdul Aziz Stadium; Attendance: 0 Referee: Khalid Al-Johani

23 February 2021 20	Al-Batin	2–2	Al-Qadsiah	Hafar al-Batin
15:45	Abreu 45+2'; Al Abbas 73'	Report	Stanley 17'; Williams (yellow card) 43'; Al-Dawsari (yellow card) 53'; Andria 75'	Stadium: Al-Batin Club Stadium; Attendance: 0 Referee: Shukri Al-Hanfoush

27 February 2021 21	Al-Batin	3–0	Al-Wehda	Hafar al-Batin
15:50	Obaid 37'; Abreu 59', 84'; Campaña (yellow card) 68'	Report		Stadium: Al-Batin Club Stadium; Attendance: 0 Referee: Abdullah Al-Harbi

4 March 2021 22	Al-Taawoun	2–2	Al-Batin	Buraidah
18:45	Tawamba 6', 45+3', (yellow card) 38'; Al-Zubaidi (yellow card) 69'	Report	Hyland (yellow card) 32'; Al-Shammeri (yellow card) 59'; Abreu 77', (yellow card) 90+2'; Al-Mozairib 84'	Stadium: King Abdullah Sport City Stadium; Attendance: 0 Referee: Mohammed Al-Beredi

10 March 2021 23	Al-Batin	0–2	Al-Fateh	Hafar al-Batin
15:50	Al-Shammeri (yellow card) 62'; Hadl (yellow card) 75'; Al-Owdah (yellow card) 89'; Chaves (yellow card) 90+6'	Report	Batna 1', (yellow card) 73' te Vrede 65'; Soudani (yellow card) 75'; Al-Zaqaan (yellow card) 90'	Stadium: Al-Batin Club Stadium; Attendance: 0 Referee: Raed Al-Zahrani

20 March 2021 24	Al-Nassr	7–0	Al-Batin	Riyadh
20:45	Lajami 13'; Amrabat 49'; Al-Qarni 52' (o.g.); Hamdallah 58', 63' (pen.); Petros 68'; Al-Hassan (yellow card) 74'; Al-Ghamdi 79'; Al-Amri (yellow card) 87'	Report	Al-Rubaie (yellow card) 62'; Almas (yellow card) 71'; Campaña (yellow card) 72'	Stadium: Mrsool Park; Attendance: 0 Referee: Mohammed Al-Nuhait

10 April 2021 25	Al-Batin	1–4	Al-Shabab	Hafar al-Batin
18:55	Rayhi 28'; Al-Shammeri (yellow card) 48'	Report	Banega 7' (pen.), 45'; Martins (yellow card) 37'; Guanca 41', 49'; Al-Sqoor (yellow card) 84'; Al-Qahtani (red card) 90+3'	Stadium: Al-Batin Club Stadium; Attendance: 0 Referee: Alexis Herrera (Venezuela)

16 April 2021 26	Al-Ittihad	0–0	Al-Batin	Mecca
22:10	Al-Jebreen (yellow card) 64'; Hegazi (yellow card) 90+3'	Report	Sami (yellow card) 18'; Freeh (yellow card) 90+7'	Stadium: King Abdul Aziz Stadium; Attendance: 0 Referee: Sami Al-Jires

14 May 2021 27	Al-Hilal	1–1	Al-Batin	Riyadh
21:00	Gomis 19'; N. Al-Dawsari (yellow card) 61'	Report	Rayhi 29'; Al-Owdah (yellow card) 81'	Stadium: Prince Faisal bin Fahd Stadium; Attendance: 0 Referee: Mustapha Ghorbal (Algeria)

19 May 2021 28	Al-Batin	3–2	Al-Ettifaq	Hafar al-Batin
19:20	Abreu 16'; Hyland (yellow card) 56'; Al Abbas 78'; El Jebli 82'; Sami (yellow card) 84'	Report	Ghazi (yellow card) 3'; Kiss 50' (pen.); Al-Kwikbi 56'	Stadium: Al-Batin Club Stadium; Attendance: 342; Referee: Khalid Al-Johani

26 May 2021 29	Al-Batin	0–2	Damac	Hafar al-Batin
21:00	Sami (yellow card) 53'; Al Khairi (red card) 90+1'	Report	Vittor (yellow card) 56'; Zelaya 73'; Antolić (yellow card) 80'; Al-Ammar 84'	Stadium: Al-Batin Club Stadium; Attendance: 968; Referee: Turki Al-Khudhayr

30 May 2021 30	Al-Ain	3–4	Al-Batin	Al Bahah
21:00	Sufyani 50', 66'; Moutari 57'; Al-Qeshtah (yellow card) 71'; Bradarić (yellow card) 76'	Report	Abreu 29'; Rayhi 35', 85' (pen.); El Jebli 76' (pen.); Sharahili (yellow card) 89'; Campaña (yellow card) 90+4'	Stadium: King Saud Sport City Stadium; Attendance: 250; Referee: Abdullah Al-Harbi

=== King Cup ===
All times are local, AST (UTC+3).

17 December 2020 Round of 16	Al-Batin	3–0	Abha	Hafar al-Batin
15:15	Chaves 9'; Sami 25'; Al-Qarni (yellow card) 47'; El Jebli (yellow card) 48'; Abreu 82'	Report	Al-Jamaan (yellow card) 8'; Al-Jumeiah (yellow card) 22'	Stadium: Al-Batin Club Stadium; Attendance: 0 Referee: Mohammed Al-Nuhait

15 March 2021 Quarter-finals	Al-Batin	1–2	Al-Faisaly	Hafar al-Batin
18:45	Sami (yellow card) 4', (goal) 36'; Schenk (yellow card) 24' (yellow-red card) 90+1'; Al-Mozairib (yellow card) 60'	Report	Al-Saiari 5', 78'; Majrashi (yellow card) 32'; Al-Sharid (yellow card) 45+1'; Kaabi (yellow card) 71'	Stadium: Al-Batin Club Stadium; Attendance: 0 Referee: Faisal Al-Blwi

== Statistics ==
=== Appearances ===
Last updated on 30 May 2021.

No.	Pos	Nat	Player	Total		Pro League		King Cup	
No.	Pos	Nat	Player	Apps	Goals	Apps	Goals	Apps	Goals
Goalkeepers
1	GK	(Saudi Arabia) KSA	Hani Al-Nahedh	0	0	0	0	0	0
22	GK	(Saudi Arabia) KSA	Mishaal Al-Shammari	0	0	0	0	0	0
25	GK	(Uruguay) URU	Martín Campaña	27	0	27	0	0	0
26	GK	(Saudi Arabia) KSA	Mazyad Freeh	6	0	3+1	0	2	0
Defenders
2	DF	(Saudi Arabia) KSA	Omar Al-Owdah	21	0	17+2	0	2	0
4	DF	(Netherlands) NED	Xandro Schenk	26	0	24+1	0	1	0
5	DF	(Brazil) BRA	Renato Chaves	25	2	23	1	2	1
12	DF	(Saudi Arabia) KSA	Hassan Raghfawi	13	0	11+1	0	1	0
13	DF	(Saudi Arabia) KSA	Naif Almas	13	0	9+3	0	1	0
29	DF	(Saudi Arabia) KSA	Badr Al-Shammari	0	0	0	0	0	0
50	DF	(Saudi Arabia) KSA	Saad Al Khairi	26	0	23+2	0	0+1	0
55	DF	(Saudi Arabia) KSA	Masoud Al-Rubaie	4	0	4	0	0	0
Midfielders
6	MF	(Saudi Arabia) KSA	Abdulaziz Damdam	17	0	2+14	0	0+1	0
8	MF	(Saudi Arabia) KSA	Dhaifallah Al-Qarni	30	0	24+4	0	2	0
10	MF	(Netherlands) NED	Youssef El Jebli	28	5	26	5	2	0
11	MF	(Netherlands) NED	Mohamed Rayhi	26	6	22+3	6	0+1	0
17	MF	(Saudi Arabia) KSA	Bassam Al-Hurayji	7	0	1+5	0	0+1	0
18	MF	(Saudi Arabia) KSA	Abdulmalek Al-Shammeri	24	0	20+2	0	2	0
19	MF	(Saudi Arabia) KSA	Mohammed Freeh	0	0	0	0	0	0
21	MF	(Saudi Arabia) KSA	Zakaria Sami	29	2	25+2	0	2	2
27	MF	(Saudi Arabia) KSA	Abdulmajeed Obaid	7	1	2+4	1	0+1	0
37	MF	(Saudi Arabia) KSA	Turki Mohammed	0	0	0	0	0	0
70	MF	(Saudi Arabia) KSA	Rakan Al-Shamlan	15	2	7+8	2	0	0
88	MF	(Trinidad and Tobago) TTO	Khaleem Hyland	21	0	18+2	0	1	0
Forwards
3	FW	(Saudi Arabia) KSA	Hassan Sharahili	17	2	2+14	2	0+1	0
7	FW	(Saudi Arabia) KSA	Yousef Al-Mozairib	14	2	8+5	2	1	0
9	FW	(Angola) ANG	Fábio Abreu	30	18	28	17	2	1
14	FW	(Saudi Arabia) KSA	Saleh Al Abbas	16	4	4+11	4	1	0
15	FW	(Saudi Arabia) KSA	Mohammed Al-Dhefiri	5	0	0+4	0	0+1	0
16	FW	(Saudi Arabia) KSA	Fahad Hadl	13	1	0+13	1	0	0
56	FW	(Saudi Arabia) KSA	Abdulrahman Saad	0	0	0	0	0	0

=== Goalscorers ===
Rank	No.	Pos	Nat	Name	Pro League	King Cup	Total
1	9	FW	(Angola)	Fábio Abreu	17	1	18
2	11	MF	(Netherlands)	Mohamed Rayhi	6	0	6
3	10	MF	(Netherlands)	Youssef El Jebli	5	0	5
4	14	FW	(Saudi Arabia)	Saleh Al Abbas	4	0	4
5	3	FW	(Saudi Arabia)	Hassan Sharahili	2	0	2
5	5	DF	(Brazil)	Renato Chaves	1	1	2
5	7	FW	(Saudi Arabia)	Yousef Al-Mozairib	2	0	2
5	21	MF	(Saudi Arabia)	Zakaria Sami	0	2	2
5	70	MF	(Saudi Arabia)	Rakan Al-Shamlan	2	0	2
10	16	FW	(Saudi Arabia)	Fahad Hadl	1	0	1
10	27	MF	(Saudi Arabia)	Abdulmajeed Obaid	1	0	1
Own goal					2	0	2
Total					43	4	47

Last Updated: 30 May 2021

=== Assists ===
Rank	No.	Pos	Nat	Name	Pro League	King Cup	Total
1	10	MF	(Netherlands)	Youssef El Jebli	11	1	12
2	11	MF	(Netherlands)	Mohamed Rayhi	4	1	5
3	21	MF	(Saudi Arabia)	Zakaria Sami	3	0	3
3	50	DF	(Saudi Arabia)	Saad Al Khairi	3	0	3
5	5	DF	(Brazil)	Renato Chaves	1	1	2
5	8	MF	(Saudi Arabia)	Dhaifallah Al-Qarni	2	0	2
5	9	FW	(Angola)	Fábio Abreu	2	0	2
5	18	MF	(Saudi Arabia)	Abdulmalek Al-Shammeri	2	0	2
9	4	DF	(Netherlands)	Xandro Schenk	1	0	1
9	12	DF	(Saudi Arabia)	Hassan Raghfawi	1	0	1
9	14	FW	(Saudi Arabia)	Saleh Al Abbas	1	0	1
9	16	FW	(Saudi Arabia)	Fahad Hadl	1	0	1
9	27	MF	(Saudi Arabia)	Abdulmajeed Obaid	1	0	1
Total					33	3	36

Last Updated: 30 May 2021

=== Clean sheets ===
Rank	No.	Pos	Nat	Name	Pro League	King Cup	Total
1	25	GK	(Uruguay)	Martín Campaña	3	0	3
2	26	GK	(Saudi Arabia)	Mazyad Freeh	1	1	2
Total					3	1	4

Last Updated: 16 April 2021
