= Bassam Al-Hurayji =

Saudi Arabian footballer (born 2000)

Personal information
- Full name: Bassam Mohammed Al-Hurayji
- Date of birth: 29 March 2000 (age 26)
- Place of birth: Saudi Arabia
- Height: 1.70 m (5 ft 7 in)
- Positions: Right-back; midfielder

Team information
- Current team: Al-Taawoun
- Number: 66

Youth career
- Al Batin

Senior career*
Years	Team	Apps	(Gls)
2020–2023	Al Batin	42	(0)
2023–2025	Al-Ahli	22	(0)
2025–	Al-Taawoun	15	(2)
- * Club domestic league appearances and goals as of 28 August 2026

Bassam Al-Hurayji (Arabic: بسام الحريجي, born 29 March 2000) is a Saudi Arabian professional footballer who plays as a right-back or a midfielder for Pro League club Al-Taawoun.

== Career ==
Al-Hurayji began his career at the youth team Al Batin. He made his debut on 10 September 2020 in the league match against Al-Qadsiah by coming off the bench replacing Dhaifallah Al-Qarni. On 12 February 2021, Al-Hurayji made his Pro League debut against Al-Raed by coming off the bench replacing Mohamed Rayhi in the 84th minute. On 23 February 2021, Al-Hurayji made his first start for Al-Batin in the 2–2 draw against Al-Qadsiah. On 8 July 2022, Al-Hurayji renewed his contract with Al-Batin. On 6 August 2023, Al-Hurayji joined Al-Ahli on a two-year deal. On 10 September 2025, Al-Hurayji joined Al-Taawoun on a three-year deal.

== Career statistics ==
As of match played 27 May 2025

Appearances and goals by club, season and competition
Club	Season	League			Cup		Other		Total	
Club	Season	Division	Apps	Goals	Apps	Goals	Apps	Goals	Apps	Goals
Al-Batin	2019–20	MS League	1	0	0	0	—		1	0
Al-Batin	2020–21	Pro League	6	0	1	0	—		7	0
Al-Batin	2021–22	Pro League	7	0	0	0	—		7	0
Al-Batin	2022–23	Pro League	28	0	1	0	—		29	0
Al-Batin	Total		42	0	2	0	0	0	44	0
Al-Ahli	2023–24	Pro League	16	0	2	0	—		18	0
Al-Ahli	2024–25	Pro League	6	0	1	0	3	0	10	0
Al-Ahli	Total		22	0	3	0	3	0	28	0
Al-Taawoun	2025–26	Pro League	0	0	0	0	—		0	0
Career total			64	0	5	0	3	0	72	0

== Honours ==
Al Batin

- MS League: 2019–20

Al-Ahli

- Saudi Super Cup: 2025
- AFC Champions League Elite: 2024–25
