= Yousef Al-Shammari =

Saudi Arabian footballer

Yousef Al-Shammari يوسف الشمري
Personal information
- Full name: Yousef Sami Al-Mozairib Al-Shammari
- Date of birth: 9 December 1997 (age 28)
- Place of birth: Saudi Arabia
- Height: 1.77 m (5 ft 10 in)
- Positions: Winger; striker

Youth career
- –2016: Arar
- 2016–2018: Al-Batin

Senior career*
Years	Team	Apps	(Gls)
2017–2023	Al-Batin	109	(20)
2023–2026	Al-Hazem	59	(6)
- * Club domestic league appearances and goals as of 24 April 2026

Yousef Al-Mozairib Al-Shammari (Arabic: يوسف المزيريب الشمري, born 9 December 1997) is a Saudi Arabian professional footballer who plays as a winger.

== Career statistics ==
=== Club ===
As of 9 February 2023

Club	Season	League		King Cup		Asia		Other		Total	
Club	Season	Apps	Goals	Apps	Goals	Apps	Goals	Apps	Goals	Apps	Goals
Al-Batin	2017–18	3	1	1	0	—		—		4	1
Al-Batin	2018–19	12	0	3	1	—		—		15	1
Al-Batin	2019–20	30	5	1	1	—		—		31	6
Al-Batin	2020–21	13	2	1	0	—		—		31	6
Al-Batin	2021–22	25	3	2	0	—		—		31	6
Al-Batin	2022–23	16	6	1	1	—		—		31	6
Al-Batin	Total	99	17	9	3	0	0	0	0	108	20
Career totals		99	17	9	3	0	0	0	0	108	20

== Honours ==
Al-Batin

- MS League: 2019–20
