= Mohammed Al-Dhefiri =

Saudi Arabian footballer

Personal information
- Full name: Mohammed Mohsen Al-Dhefiri
- Date of birth: 6 April 1999 (age 27)
- Place of birth: Saudi Arabia
- Height: 1.66 m (5 ft 5 1/2 in)
- Position: Forward

Team information
- Current team: Al-Qala
- Number: 18

Youth career
- Al-Batin

Senior career*
Years	Team	Apps	(Gls)
2018–2022	Al-Batin	30	(2)
2022	→ Ohod (loan)	18	(1)
2022–2024	Al-Qaisumah	26	(7)
2024–2025	Al-Jubail	25	(0)
2025–	Al-Qala		
- * Club domestic league appearances and goals as of 31 May 2025

Mohammed Al-Dhefiri (Arabic: محمد الظفيري, born 6 April 1999) is a Saudi Arabian professional footballer who plays as a forward for Al-Qala.

== Career ==
Al-Dhefiri started his career at Al-Batin and was promoted to the first team during the 2018-19 season. He played his first match against Al-Taawoun on 26 October 2018. During the 2019–20 season Al-Dhefiri made 15 appearances and scored twice as Al-Batin were crowned champions of the MS League. On 13 January 2022, Al-Dhafiri joined Ohod on loan. On 9 August 2022, Al-Dhefiri joined First Division side Al-Qaisumah. On 3 August 2024, Al-Dhefiri joined Al-Jubail. On 21 September 2025, Al-Dhefiri joined Al-Qala.

== Honours ==
Al-Batin

- MS League: 2019–20
