= Abdulaziz Al-Sharid =

Saudi Arabian footballer

Abdulaziz Al Sharid
Personal information
- Full name: Abdulaziz Mubarak Abdullah Al Sharid
- Date of birth: 5 January 1994 (age 32)
- Place of birth: Saudi Arabia
- Height: 1.63 m (5 ft 4 in)
- Position: Midfielder

Team information
- Current team: Al-Zulfi
- Number: 34

Youth career
- Al-Hilal

Senior career*
Years	Team	Apps	(Gls)
2016	Al-Hilal	1	(0)
2016–2018	Al-Taawoun	21	(0)
2018	→ Ohod (loan)	7	(0)
2018–2019	Al-Fateh	4	(0)
2019	Al-Ain	10	(0)
2019–2020	Al-Batin	35	(2)
2020–2023	Al-Faisaly	42	(1)
2023–2024	Al-Jabalain	25	(1)
2024–2025	Al-Bukiryah	30	(4)
2025–	Al-Zulfi	0	(0)
- * Club domestic league appearances and goals as of 31 May 2023

Abdulaziz Al Sharid (Arabic: عبدالعزيز آل شريد; born 5 January 1994) is a Saudi Arabian professional footballer who plays as a midfielder for Al-Zulfi.

== Career ==
On 3 July 2023, Al Sharid joined Al-Jabalain.

On 13 July 2024, Al Sharid joined Al-Bukiryah.

On 14 August 2025, Al-Sharid joined Al-Zulfi.

== Honours ==
Al-Hilal

- Crown Prince Cup: 2015–16

Al-Batin

- MS League: 2019–20

Al-Faisaly

- King Cup: 2020–21
