= Abdulmajeed Obaid =

Saudi Arabian footballer

Personal information
- Full name: Abdulmajeed Obaid Faleh Al-Mutairi
- Date of birth: November 4, 1995 (age 31)
- Height: 1.68 m (5 ft 6 in)
- Position: Midfielder

Team information
- Current team: Al-Nairyah
- Number: 15

Youth career
- Al-Batin

Senior career*
Years	Team	Apps	(Gls)
2015–2022	Al-Batin	57	(3)
2022	Al-Qaisumah	1	(0)
2022–2023	Al-Kholood	16	(2)
2023–2025	Al-Qaisumah		
2025–	Al-Nairyah		
- * Club domestic league appearances and goals

Abdulmajeed Obaid (Arabic: عبدالمجيد عبيد; born 4 November 1995) is a Saudi Arabian footballer who currently plays as a midfielder for Al-Nairyah.

== Career ==
On 11 August 2022, Obaid joined derby rivals Al-Qaisumah after spending 7 years at Al-Batin. On 4 September 2022, Obaid joined Al-Kholood On 14 July 2023, Obaid joined Al-Qaisumah. On 1 October 2025, Obaid joined Al-Nairyah.

== Honours ==
Al-Batin

- MS League: 2019–20
