= Maher Othman =

Saudi Arabian footballer

Personal information
- Full name: Maher Ismael Otman
- Date of birth: 8 January 1991 (age 35)
- Place of birth: Mecca, Saudi Arabia
- Height: 1.72 m (5 ft 7 1/2 in)
- Position: Midfielder

Senior career*
Years	Team	Apps	(Gls)
2011–2016	Al-Wehda		
2016–2019	Al-Ahli	0	(0)
2018–2019	→ Al-Tai (loan)	23	(1)
2019–2020	Al-Batin	10	(0)
- * Club domestic league appearances and goals as of 20 September 2020

Maher Ismael Othman (Arabic: ماهر إسماعيل عثمان; born 8 January 1991) is a Saudi football player who plays as a midfielder.

== Honours ==
Al-Batin

- MS League: 2019–20
