= Martial Yao =

Ivorian footballer (born 1989)

Personal information
- Full name: Martial Yao Kouassi
- Date of birth: 4 October 1989 (age 37)
- Place of birth: Bingerville, Ivory Coast
- Height: 1.73 m (5 ft 8 in)
- Position: Midfielder

Senior career*
Years	Team	Apps	(Gls)
2006–2010	ASEC Mimosas		
2010–2016	Stade Tunisien	68	(3)
2013–2014	→ LPS Tozeur (loan)	17	(3)
2016–2017	US Ben Guerdane	21	(0)
2017	Al-Merrikh		
2017–2018	AS Gabès	6	(0)
2018–2019	Al-Adalah		
2019–2020	Fujairah	6	(0)
2020	→ Al-Bukiryah (loan)		

International career
- Ivory Coast U17
- * Club domestic league appearances and goals as of 09:04, 20 March 2021 (UTC)

Martial Yao Kouassi (born 4 October 1989) is an Ivorian professional footballer who plays as a midfielder.

== Club career ==
Born in Bingerville, Yao has played for ASEC Mimosas, Stade Tunisien, LPS Tozeur, US Ben Guerdane, Al-Merrikh, AS Gabès, Al-Adalah, Fujairah and Al-Bukiryah.

On 2 June 2018, he moved from Tunisian club AS Gabès to Saudi club Al-Adalah.

== International career ==
Yao played at the 2005 FIFA U-17 World Championship, and was compared to Claude Makélélé for his tireless midfield performances.
