= Hani Al-Nahedh =

Saudi Arabian footballer

Personal information
- Full name: Hani Mohammed Al-Nahedh
- Date of birth: August 3, 1987 (age 39)
- Place of birth: Ha'il, Saudi Arabia
- Position: Goalkeeper

Team information
- Current team: Al-Saqer
- Number: 50

Youth career
- Al-Ta'ee

Senior career*
Years	Team	Apps	(Gls)
2007–2012	Al-Ta'ee		
2012–2018	Al-Ittihad	20	(0)
2013	→ Al-Faisaly (loan)	0	(0)
2018–2019	Al-Qaisumah	0	(0)
2019–2022	Al-Batin	1	(0)
2022–2023	Al-Riyadh	1	(0)
2023–2024	Al-Jubail		
2024–2025	Al-Anwar		
2025–	Al-Saqer		
- * Club domestic league appearances and goals as of 21 June 2022

Mohammed Al-Nahedh (Arabic: هاني الناهض) (born 3 August 1987) is a Saudi Arabian footballer who plays for Al-Saqer as a goalkeeper.

== Career ==
On 20 June 2022, Al-Nahedh joined Al-Riyadh.

On 11 July 2024, Al-Nahedh joined Al-Anwar.

On 15 August 2025, Al-Nahedh joined Al-Saqer.

== Honours ==
Al-Ittihad

- King Cup: 2013
- Crown Prince Cup: 2016–17

Al-Batin

- MS League: 2019–20
