= Dhaifallah Al-Qarni =

Saudi Arabian footballer

Dhaifallah Al-Qarni ضيف الله القرني
Personal information
- Full name: Dhaifallah Dhafi Al-Qarni
- Date of birth: 6 November 1988 (age 38)
- Place of birth: Saudi Arabia
- Height: 1.68 m (5 ft 6 in)
- Position: Midfielder

Youth career
- –2011: Al-Mujazzal

Senior career*
Years	Team	Apps	(Gls)
2011–2017	Al-Mujazzal		
2017	Ohod	13	(2)
2017–2019	Al-Fayha	29	(1)
2019–2022	Al-Batin	68	(7)
2022–2023	Al-Ain	12	(0)
2023–2025	Al-Qaisumah		
- * Club domestic league appearances and goals as of 20 September 2020

Dhaifallah Al-Qarni (Arabic: ضيف الله القرني, born 6 November 1988) is a Saudi Arabian professional footballer who plays as a midfielder.

== Career ==
On 30 May 2017, Al-Qarni joined Al-Fayha. On 22 July 2019, Al-Qarni joined Al-Batin. On 26 August 2022, Al-Qarni joined Al-Ain. On 14 August 2023, Al-Qarni joined Al-Qaisumah.

== Honours ==
Al-Batin

- MS League: 2019–20
