= Sultan Al-Shammeri =

Saudi Arabian footballer

Personal information
- Full name: Sultan Saoud Al-Shammeri
- Date of birth: October 28, 1991 (age 34)
- Place of birth: Saudi Arabia
- Height: 1.68 m (5 ft 6 in)
- Position: Winger

Team information
- Current team: Hajer
- Number: 15

Senior career*
Years	Team	Apps	(Gls)
2011–2015	Al-Fateh	4	(0)
2015–2019	Al-Tai	106	(17)
2019–2020	Al-Batin	24	(0)
2020–2021	Al-Jabalain	16	(3)
2021–2022	Arar		
2022–2023	Al-Bukiryah		
2023–2024	Al-Zulfi		
2024–2025	Al-Taraji		
2025–	Hajer		
- * Club domestic league appearances and goals as of 20 September 2020

Sultan Al-Shammeri (born 28 October 1991) is a Saudi football player. He plays for Hajer as a winger.

== Career ==
On 25 July 2023, Al-Shammeri joined Al-Zulfi.

On 7 August 2025, Al-Shammeri joined Hajer.

== Honours ==
Al-Fateh

- Saudi Professional League: 2012–13
- Saudi Super Cup: 2013

Al-Batin

- MS League: 2019–20
