= Ismael Al-Maghrebi =

Saudi Arabian footballer

Personal information
- Full name: Ismael Mohammed Al-Maghrebi
- Date of birth: July 17, 1991 (age 35)
- Place of birth: Jeddah, Saudi Arabia
- Height: 1.76 m (5 ft 9 in)
- Position: Striker

Youth career
- Al-Ahli

Senior career*
Years	Team	Apps	(Gls)
2013–2015	Al-Ahli	0	(0)
2013–2014	→ Al-Wehda (loan)	?	(15)
2014–2015	→ Al-Taawoun (loan)	18	(8)
2015–2017	Al-Shabab	26	(4)
2017–2019	Al-Taawoun	12	(1)
2019	Ohod	7	(0)
2019–2020	Al-Batin	10	(2)
2020–2021	Al-Bukayriyah	6	(0)
2021–2022	Al-Kawkab	16	(2)
2023–2024	Al-Tuhami		
- * Club domestic league appearances and goals as of 20 September 2020

Ismael Al-Maghrebi (Arabic: إسماعيل المغربي, born 17 July 1991) is a Saudi Arabian football player who currently plays as a striker.

== Honours ==
Al-Batin

- MS League: 2019–20
