= Fahad Hadl =

Saudi Arabian footballer (born 1988)

Fahad Hadl فهد هدل
Personal information
- Full name: Fahad Hadl Al-Shammeri
- Date of birth: 17 October 1988 (age 38)
- Place of birth: Saudi Arabia
- Position: Forward

Team information
- Current team: Al-Qaisumah
- Number: 10

Youth career
- Al-Qaisumah

Senior career*
Years	Team	Apps	(Gls)
2009–2019	Al-Qaisumah	87	(30)
2019–2021	Al-Batin	29	(3)
2021–2022	Al-Qaisumah	26	(14)
2022–2024	Al-Jubail		
2024–2025	Al-Almin		
2025–	Al-Qaisumah		
- * Club domestic league appearances and goals as of 5 November 2022

Fahad Hadl Al-Shammeri (Arabic: فهد هدل الشمري; born 17 October 1988) is a Saudi Arabian professional footballer who plays for Al-Qaisumah as a forward.

== Career ==
Fahad Hadl started his career at the youth team of Al-Qaisumah and represented the club at every level. On 23 July 2019, Fahad Hadl joined Al-Batin. Fahad Hadl achieved promotion with Al-Batin to the Pro League.

== Honours ==
Al-Qaisumah

- Second Division: 2015–16

Al-Batin

- MS League: 2019–20
