= Omar Al-Owdah =

Saudi Arabian footballer (born 1998)

Personal information
- Full name: Omar Hamad Al-Owdah
- Date of birth: 29 December 1998 (age 27)
- Place of birth: Unaizah, Saudi Arabia
- Height: 1.74 m (5 ft 9 in)
- Position: Full-back

Team information
- Current team: Al-Jubail
- Number: 22

Youth career
- 2010–2015: Al-Najma
- 2015–2018: Al-Hilal

Senior career*
Years	Team	Apps	(Gls)
2017–2019	Al-Hilal	0	(0)
2018–2019	→ Al-Fayha (loan)	11	(0)
2019	Al-Raed	0	(0)
2019–2022	Al-Batin	44	(1)
2022–2025	Al-Khaleej	32	(0)
2025–	Al-Jubail		

International career
2017–2018	Saudi Arabia U20		
2018–2020	Saudi Arabia U23		
- * Club domestic league appearances and goals as of April 12, 2023

Omar Al-Owdah (Arabic: عمر العوده; born 29 December 1998) is a Saudi Arabian footballer who plays as a full back for Al-Jubail.

== Career ==
Al-Owdah signed with Al-Najma in 2010 after having failed trials with Al-Taawoun and Al-Arabi. He started his career playing as a forward before being moved to play as a defender on the advice of his former youth coach Ahmed Abdulmaqsoud. On 17 July 2015, he left Al-Najma after 5 years and joined Al-Hilal. On 23 August 2018, Al-Owdah joined Al-Fayha on loan until the end of the 2018–19 season. He made 13 appearances throughout all competitions and scored 1 goal in the King Cup. On 13 July 2019, Al-Owdah left Al-Hilal and joined Al-Raed. Just one month after signing for Al-Raed, his contract was terminated due to his failure to meet the requirements for professional players. On 21 August 2019, Al-Owdah dropped down a division and joined Al-Batin. On 27 July 2022, Al-Owdah joined Al-Khaleej on a one-year deal. On 10 September 2025, Al-Owdah joined Al-Jubail.

== Honours ==
Al-Batin

- MS League: 2019–20
