= Carlão (footballer, born 1992) =

Brazilian footballer

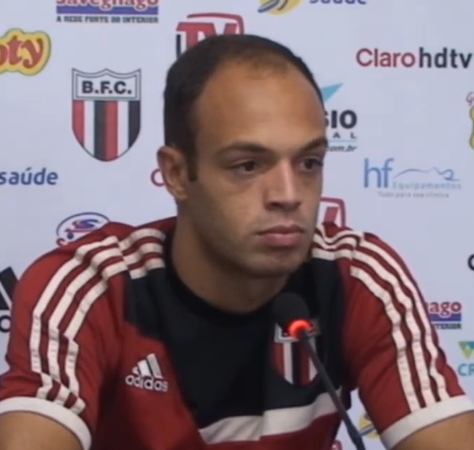
- Carlão in 2014

Personal information
- Full name: Carlos Henrique de Moura Brito
- Date of birth: 3 July 1992 (age 34)
- Place of birth: Ribeirão Preto, Brazil
- Height: 1.86 m (6 ft 1 in)
- Position: Forward

Team information
- Current team: Novorizontino
- Number: 9

Youth career
- 2005–2010: Paulista
- 2012: Grêmio

Senior career*
Years	Team	Apps	(Gls)
2010–2012	Paulista	14	(0)
2012	Atlético Sorocaba	0	(0)
2013	CRB	9	(0)
2013–2014	Paulista	6	(1)
2014	Capivariano	10	(2)
2014–2015	Botafogo-SP	4	(0)
2015	Paraná	18	(6)
2016	Capivariano	5	(0)
2017–2018	São Caetano	32	(12)
2018	Sampaio Corrêa	11	(1)
2018–2019	Mirassol	14	(2)
2019	Novorizontino	7	(2)
2019–2021	Al-Jabalain	73	(38)
2021–2022	Al Qadsiah	19	(5)
2022–2023	Al-Jabalain	14	(5)
2023–2025	Noroeste	63	(26)
2024	→ Ferroviária (loan)	24	(9)
2025	Ferroviária	36	(13)
2026	Noroeste	8	(4)
2026–	Novorizontino	36	(5)
- * Club domestic league appearances and goals as of 17 November 2026

Carlos Henrique de Moura Brito (born 3 July 1992), simply known as Carlão, is a Brazilian professional footballer who plays as a forward for Novorizontino.

== Career ==
Born in Ribeirão Preto, São Paulo, Carlão joined Paulista's youth sides in 2005, aged 12. He made his first team debut in 2010, helping the side to win two consecutive Copa Paulista titles, before moving to Atlético Sorocaba in 2012, being coached by Fernando Diniz, his first senior coach at Paulista.

In late 2012, Carlão played for the under-20 team of Grêmio before joining CRB ahead of the 2013 season. In August of that year, he returned to Paulista, before signing for Capivariano on 25 February 2014.

After helping Capivariano to achieve their first-ever promotion from the Campeonato Paulista Série A2 as champions, Carlão joined Botafogo-SP in June 2014. He was presented at Série B side Paraná on 20 August 2015, reuniting with Diniz, and scored a hat-trick on his club debut three days later, but in a 4–3 loss to Ceará.

After playing in the 2016 Campeonato Paulista back at Capivariano, Carlão moved to Albania with Partizani Tirana in September of that year, but the deal later collapsed due to registration issues. In December, he returned to his home country with São Caetano, where he was the club's top goal scorer in the 2017 Paulista Série A2 with ten goals, as the club won their first title in 13 years.

On 16 April 2018, Carlão was confirmed as Sampaio Corrêa's addition for the campaign. He subsequently represented Mirassol and Novorizontino, but was unable to score in a regular basis.

In 2019, Carlão moved to Saudi Arabia where he led Al-Jabalain in goal-scoring for two Saudi First Division League seasons. He joined rivals Al Qadsiah in July 2021, before returning to his previous club Al-Jabalain in July 2012.

On 4 January 2023, Carlão and Al-Jabalain agreed to end the contract mutually. Eight days later, he returned to Brazil and was announced at Noroeste.

Carlão was the top scorer of the 2024 Série A2 with 11 goals, helping Norusca to achieve promotion, and was loaned to Ferroviária in the Série C on 18 April of that year. He also helped AFE to achieve promotion before returning to his parent club in November, but returned to Ferroviária on 12 March 2025, on a deal until November.

Carlão scored 13 goals in the 2025 Série B, but was unable to prevent team relegation. On 26 December 2025, he returned to Noroeste for the 2026 Campeonato Paulista, where he scored four goals in eight matches before departing on 19 February.

On 25 February 2026, Carlão returned to Novorizontino, with the club now in division two.

== Career statistics ==
As of 26 March 2026

Appearances and goals by club, season and competition
Club	Season	League			State League		National Cup		Continental		Other		Total	
Club	Season	Division	Apps	Goals	Apps	Goals	Apps	Goals	Apps	Goals	Apps	Goals	Apps	Goals
Paulista	2010	Paulista	—		4	0	—		—		13 (Note: Appearance(s) in Copa Paulista)	4	17	4
Paulista	2011	Paulista	—		4	0	1	0	—		9	1	14	1
Paulista	2012	Paulista	—		6	0	1	0	—		—		7	0
Paulista	Total		—		14	0	2	0	—		22	5	38	5
Atlético Sorocaba	2012	Paulista A2	—		—		—		—		19	6	19	6
CRB	2013	Série C	5	0	4	0	3	0	—		6 (Note: Appearance(s) in Copa do Nordeste)	3	18	3
Paulista	2013	Paulista	—		—		—		—		6	2	6	2
Paulista	2014	Paulista	—		6	1	—		—		—		6	1
Paulista	Total		—		6	1	—		—		6	2	12	3
Capivariano	2014	Paulista A2	—		10	2	—		—		—		10	2
Botafogo-SP	2014	Paulista	—		—		—		—		23	10	23	10
Botafogo-SP	2015	Série D	—		4	0	—		—		—		4	0
Botafogo-SP	Total		—		4	0	—		—		23	10	27	10
Paraná	2015	Série B	18	6	—		—		—		—		18	6
Capivariano	2016	Paulista	—		5	0	—		—		—		5	0
São Caetano	2017	Paulista A2	—		22	10	—		—		21	7	43	17
São Caetano	2018	Paulista	—		10	2	1	0	—		—		11	2
São Caetano	Total		—		32	12	1	0	—		21	7	54	19
Sampaio Corrêa	2018	Série B	11	1	—		—		—		5	1	16	2
Mirassol	2018	Série D	—		—		—		—		14	6	14	6
Mirassol	2019	Paulista	—		14	2	—		—		—		14	2
Mirassol	Total		—		14	2	—		—		14	6	28	8
Novorizontino	2019	Série D	6	2	—		—		—		—		6	2
Al-Jabalain	2019–20	Prince Mohammad bin Salman League	37	17	—		2	1	—		—		39	18
Al-Jabalain	2020–21	Prince Mohammad bin Salman League	36	21	—		0	0	—		—		36	21
Al-Jabalain	Total		73	38	—		2	1	—		—		75	39
Al Qadsiah	2021–22	Saudi First Division League	19	5	—		—		—		—		19	5
Al-Jabalain	2022–23	Saudi First Division League	14	5	—		—		—		—		14	5
Noroeste	2023	Paulista A2	—		19	7	—		—		12	3	31	10
Noroeste	2024	Paulista A2	—		20	11	—		—		—		20	11
Noroeste	2025	Paulista	—		12	5	—		—		—		12	5
Noroeste	Total		—		51	23	—		—		12	3	63	26
Ferroviária (loan)	2024	Série C	24	9	—		—		—		—		24	9
Ferroviária	2025	Série B	36	13	—		—		—		—		36	13
Noroeste	2026	Série D	—		8	4	—		—		—		8	4
Novorizontino	2026	Série B	1	1	—		2	1	—		—		3	2
Career total			207	80	148	44	10	2	0	0	128	43	493	169

== Honours ==
Paulista

- Copa Paulista: 2010, 2011

CRB

- Campeonato Alagoano: 2013

Capivariano

- Campeonato Paulista Série A2: 2014

São Caetano

- Campeonato Paulista Série A2: 2017

Sampaio Corrêa

- Copa do Nordeste: 2018

Novorizontino

- Campeonato Brasileiro Série B: 2026
