= Meshal Al-Enazi (Saudi footballer) =

Saudi Arabian footballer

Personal information
- Full name: Meshal Ghazi Al-Enazi
- Date of birth: 7 January 1987 (age 39)
- Place of birth: Saudi Arabia
- Height: 1.78 m (5 ft 10 in)
- Position: Attacking midfielder

Youth career
- Al-Batin

Senior career*
Years	Team	Apps	(Gls)
2009–2017	Al-Raed	69	(11)
2016	→ Al-Faisaly (loan)	2	(0)
2017	Al-Orobah	5	(0)
2017–2019	Al-Khaleej	23	(3)
2019–2020	Al-Batin	5	(0)
2020–2021	Arar	22	(6)
2021	Al-Shoulla	0	(0)
2021	Arar	4	(1)
Total		130	(21)
- * Club domestic league appearances and goals

Meshal Ghazi Al-Enazi (Arabic: مشعل غازي العنزي; born 7 January 1987) is a retired Saudi football player. He played for Al-Raed, Al-Faisaly, Al-Orobah, Al-Khaleej, Al-Batin and Arar .

== Club career ==
=== Al-Raed ===
On 6 December 2008, Al-Raed bought Meshal Al-Enazi from Al-Batin.

==== 2008-09 season ====
On 29 January 2009, Meshal played his debut with Al-Raed against Al-Nassr where he came on as a substitute for Felipe Campos 75' minute, but they lost 1-0. On 23 March 2009, he played his second was against Abha when came as a substitute for Cena in the 65' minute, after 9 minutes off being subbed on he got a yellow card in the 74' minute, they won 1-0.

==== 2011-12 season ====
Meshal didn't play a league match in 09-10 and 10-11. On 12 October 2011, Meshal played his first match after a while, and it was against Al-Nassr, and he came for Ahmed Al-Kaebi in the 46' minute, but they lost 1-0. On 18 October 2011, Meshal Al-Enazi played against Al-Faisaly where he came on the 64th minute for Waleed Al-Gizani, they were hammered 4-1. On 12 January 2012, Al-Enazi played against Al-Fateh where they lost 2-1. On 8 April 2012, Meshal Al-Enazi got a yellow card against Al-Ahli in the 73' minute, they lost 5-1.

==== 2012-13 season ====
On 2 August 2012, Meshal played his first match of the season against Ittihad when he came in 61' minute, Al-Raed drew 2-2. On 8 December 2012, he started his first match in the league against Al-Ahli, but he was subbed off in the 66th minute and they drew 1-1. After that, he started his second match against Al-Nassr where they lost 2-0. On 21 February 2013, he played his last match of the season which was against Hajer where he came in the 74th minute replacing Bilal, they won 3-2.

==== 2013-14 season ====
On 24 August 2013, he started the first match of the season against Al-Ettifaq, they won 2-1. On 12 September 2013, he scored his ever goal in league against Al-Shabab but they lost 5-2. On 5 October 2013, Meshal made his first assist for Bruno to make him score the second goal against Al-Hilal which helped them win 2-1.

==== 2014-15 season ====
On 15 August 2014, Meshal started the first match of the season where they played against Al-Faisaly, they lost 1-0. On 30 August 2014, Meshal scored his first goal of the season which was in the 74th minute against Al-Orobah after being subbed on in the 46th minute, that match ended at a 2-1 loss. On 29 November 2014, Meshal scored a goal against Al-Khaleej, but they lost 2-1. On 21 December 2014, Meshal scored a free kick against Najran to make Al-Raed win 3-2. On 5 February 2015, Meshal scored a penalty against Al-Hilal. After that, he scored a penalty against Al-Nassr. On 14 May 2015, Meshal played his last match of the season against Najran where they won 2-1.

==== 2015-16 season ====
On 22 August 2015, Meshal played the first match of the season against Al-Shabab, Al-Raed lost 3-1. On 2 November 2015, Al-Enazi played against Al-Khaleej where his team lost 2-0. He left to go to Al-Faisaly on loan.

==== Al-Faisaly (loan) ====
On 4 January 2016, Al-Faisaly loaned Al-Enazi from Al-Raed for half a season. On 1 April 2016, Meshal played his debut against Al-Raed, they lost 5-0. On 8 March 2016, Meshal played against Al-Shabab, where they drew 0-0. He returned to Al-Raed.

==== 2016-17 season ====
On 3 November 2016, Meshal played against Al-Nassr where they lost 3-1. On 2 December 2016, Meshal played his last match for Al-Raed which was against Al-Qadsiah which he lost 3-0. On 31 January 2017, Al-Raed ended Meshal's contract.

=== Retirement ===
On 6 November 2021, it was announced that Al-Enazi had retired from professional football and was appointed as a member of former club Al-Batin's backroom staff.

== Honours ==
Al-Batin

- MS League: 2019–20
