= Abdulaziz Damdam =

Saudi Arabian footballer

Abdulaziz Damdam عَبْد الْعَزِيز دَمْدَم
Personal information
- Full name: Abdulaziz Ahmed Damdam
- Date of birth: 18 June 1995 (age 31)
- Place of birth: Jeddah, Saudi Arabia
- Height: 1.70 m (5 ft 7 in)
- Position: Midfielder

Team information
- Current team: Al-Anwar
- Number: 6

Youth career
- Al-Ahli

Senior career*
Years	Team	Apps	(Gls)
2019–2020	Al-Mujazzal	35	(2)
2020–2022	Al-Batin	22	(0)
2022–2023	Al-Riyadh	14	(0)
2023–2025	Ohod	30	(1)
2025–	Al-Anwar	0	(0)
- * Club domestic league appearances and goals

Abdulaziz Ahmed Damdam (Arabic: عَبْد الْعَزِيز أَحْمَد دَمْدَم; born 18 June 1995) is a Saudi Arabian professional footballer who plays as a midfielder for Al-Anwar.

== Career ==
Damdam started his career at the youth team of Al-Ahli and represented the club at every level except the senior level. On 7 August 2019, Damdam joined First Division side Al-Mujazzal. On 24 September 2020, Damdam joined Saudi Professional League side Al-Batin on a two-year deal. On 3 August 2022, Damdam joined Al-Riyadh on a free transfer. On 23 July 2023, Damdam joined Ohod. On 6 August 2025, Damdam joined Al-Anwar.
