= Sultan Ghunaiman =

Saudi Arabian footballer

Personal information
- Full name: Sultan Ghunaiman Al-Mutairi
- Date of birth: September 13, 1989 (age 37)
- Place of birth: Hafar al-Batin, Saudi Arabia
- Height: 1.83 m (6 ft 0 in)
- Position: Defender

Team information
- Current team: Al-Qaisumah
- Number: 5

Youth career
- Al-Shabab

Senior career*
Years	Team	Apps	(Gls)
2009–2020	Al-Batin		
2020–2021	Al-Jabalain	13	(2)
2021–	Al-Qaisumah		
- * Club domestic league appearances and goals

Sultan Ghunaiman Al-Mutairi (Arabic: سلطان غنيمان المطيري; born 13 September 1989) is a Saudi Arabian footballer who plays as a defender for Al-Qaisumah.

== Honours ==
Al-Batin

- MS League: 2019–20
