= Hassan Sharahili =

Saudi Arabian footballer

Hassan Sharahili حسن شراحيلي
Personal information
- Full name: Hassan Ahmed Sharahili
- Date of birth: 24 February 1993 (age 33)
- Place of birth: Dawadmi, Saudi Arabia
- Height: 1.82 m (5 ft 11 1/2 in)
- Position: Striker

Team information
- Current team: Jerash

Senior career*
Years	Team	Apps	(Gls)
–2016	Al-Dera'a		
2016–2022	Al-Batin	38	(18)
2017	→ Damac (loan)		(2)
2017–2018	→ Damac (loan)	25	(12)
2019	→ Damac (loan)	17	(8)
2021–2022	→ Al-Jabalain (loan)	22	(2)
2022–2024	Al-Arabi	46	(5)
2024–2025	Al-Ain	27	(3)
2025–2026	Al-Anwar	8	(0)
2026–	Jerash	0	(0)

International career^{‡}
2019	Saudi Arabia	2	(0)
- * Club domestic league appearances and goals as of 20 September 2020 ‡ National team caps and goals as of 25 March 2019

Hassan Sharahili (Arabic: حسن شراحيلي, born 24 February 1993) is a Saudi Arabian professional footballer who plays as a striker for Al-Anwar.

== Career ==
On 30 June 2022, Sharahili joined First Division side Al-Arabi. On 24 August 2024, Sharahili joined Al-Ain. On 2 August 2025, Sharahili joined Al-Anwar.

== International ==
He made his debut for the Saudi Arabia national football team on 25 March 2019 in a friendly against Equatorial Guinea.

== Honours ==
Damac

- MS League runner-up: 2018–19

Al-Batin

- MS League: 2019–20
