= Stanley Ohawuchi =

Nigerian footballer

Personal information
- Full name: Stanley Nka Ohawuchi
- Date of birth: 27 May 1990 (age 36)
- Place of birth: Bayelsa, Nigeria
- Height: 1.79 m (5 ft 10 1/2 in)
- Position: Striker

Team information
- Current team: Muşspor
- Number: 45

Senior career*
Years	Team	Apps	(Gls)
2007–2010	Bayelsa United		
2010–2012	Heartland		
2012	Atlético Baleares	8	(0)
2012–2014	Sliema Wanderers	19	(16)
2014–2017	Wadi Degla	62	(27)
2016–2017	→ Zamalek (loan)	25	(6)
2017–2021	Al-Qadisiyah	87	(32)
2018–2019	→ Ajman Club (loan)	25	(7)
2021–2022	Wadi Degla		
2022–2023	Al-Washm		
2023	Al-Shaeib		
2024	Sliema Wanderers	0	(0)
2024–2025	Erbaaspor	17	(5)
2025–	Muşspor	25	(9)

International career
2009	Nigeria U20	3	(0)
- * Club domestic league appearances and goals as of 7 December 2025

Stanley Nka Ohawuchi (born 27 May 1990) is a Nigerian footballer who plays as a striker for Turkish TFF 2. Lig club Muşspor.

== Career ==
On 17 September 2022, Stanley joined Al-Washm. He was released on 26 January 2023.

== International career ==
Ohawuchi represented his homeland Nigeria at the 2009 FIFA U-20 World Cup in Egypt.

== Career statistics ==
=== Club ===
As of 13 September 2021

Appearances and goals by club, season and competition
Club	Season	League			National Cup		Other		Continental		Total	
Club	Season	Division	Apps	Goals	Apps	Goals	Apps	Goals	Apps	Goals	Apps	Goals
Atlético Baleares	2011–12	Segunda División B	7	0	0	0	1 (Note: Appearance in the Promotion play-offs.)	0	—		8	0
0	0	0	0	0	0	2 (Note: Appearances in the Europa League.)	1	2	1			
Sliema Wanderers total		36	27	3	1	0	0	4	2	43	30	
Wadi Degla	2014–15	Egyptian Premier League	36	16	2	1	0	0	—		38	18
Wadi Degla	2015–16	Egyptian Premier League	26	11	2	0	0	0	—		28	11
Wadi Degla	Wadi Degla total		62	27	4	1	0	0	0	0	66	28
Zamalek (loan)	2015–16	Egyptian Premier League	0	0	0	0	0	0	5 (Note: Appearances in the CAF Champions League.)	2	5	2
Zamalek (loan)	2016–17	Egyptian Premier League	25	6	2	1	1 (Note: Appearance in the Egyptian Super Cup.)	0	8	3	36	10
Zamalek (loan)	Zamalek total		25	6	2	1	1	0	13	5	41	12
Al Qadsiah	2017–18	Saudi Professional League	22	4	3	0	0	0	—		25	4
Al Qadsiah	2019–20	Saudi First Division	37	24	1	0	0	0	—		38	24
Al Qadsiah	2020–21	Saudi Professional League	28	4	2	0	0	0	—		30	4
Al Qadsiah	Al Qadsiah total		87	32	6	0	0	0	0	0	93	32
Ajman Club (loan)	2018–19	UAE Pro League	25	7	0	0	0	0	—		25	7
Career total			242	99	15	3	2	0	17	7	276	109

== Honours ==
=== Club ===
Zamalek

- Egypt Cup: 2016
- Egyptian Super Cup: 2017
