= Lassina Diaby =

Ivorian footballer

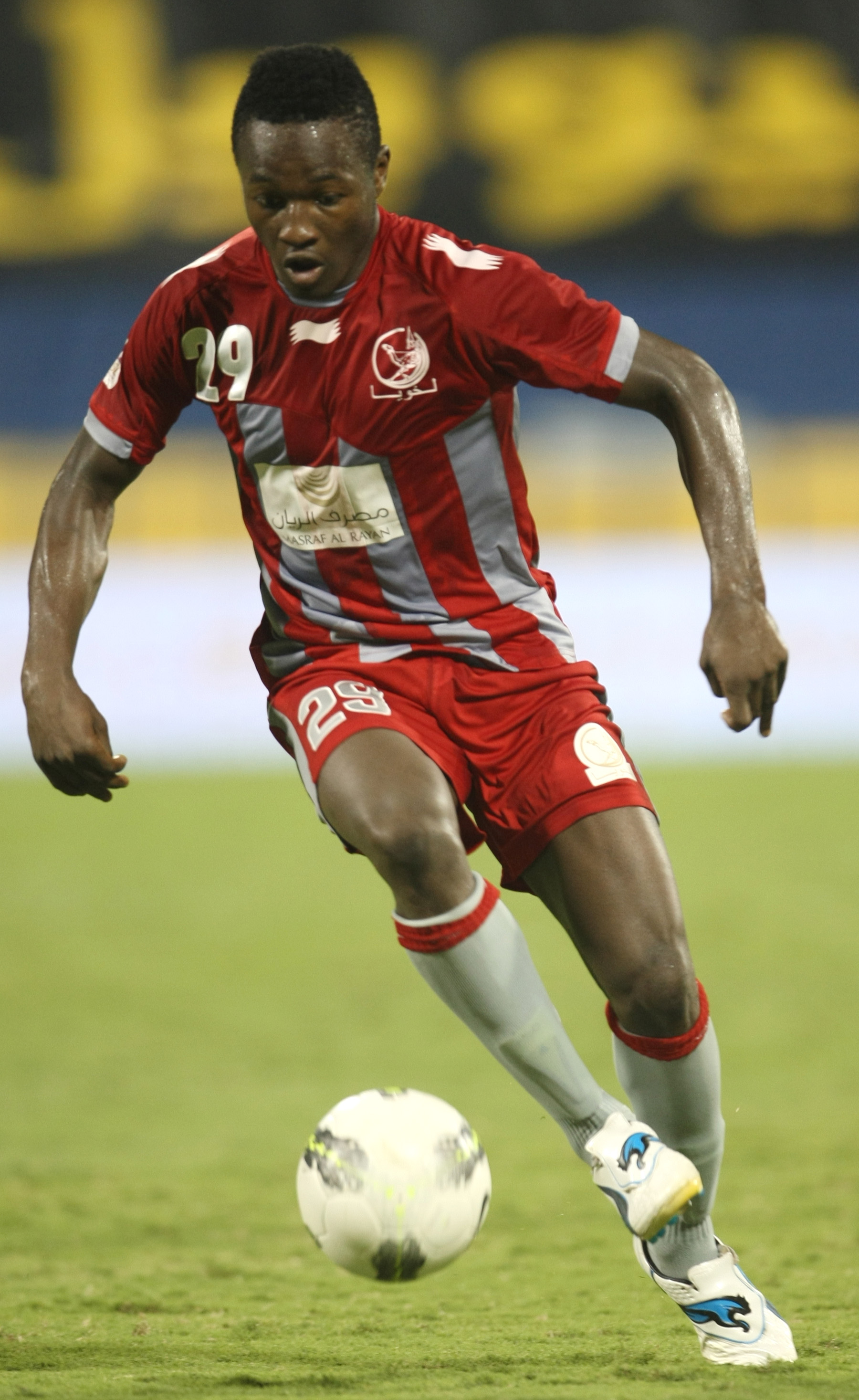

Personal information
- Full name: Lassina Diaby
- Date of birth: August 5, 1992 (age 34)
- Place of birth: Côte d'Ivoire
- Position: Forward

Senior career*
Years	Team	Apps	(Gls)
2009–2016	Lekhwiya		
2010–2011	→ Qatar SC (loan)		
2013–2014	→ Al-Gharafa (loan)		
2015	→ Qatar SC (loan)		
2015–2016	→ Al-Khor SC (loan)		
2016–2017	Al-Kharaitiyat		
2017–2018	Saham SC		
2018	Qadsia SC		
2018–2019	Al-Khaleej		
2019–2020	Al-Batin		
2021–2022	Al-Nojoom		
2023	Al-Saqer		
- * Club domestic league appearances and goals

Lassina Diaby is an Ivorian footballer who currently plays as a striker.
