= Al-Bukiryah Club Stadium =

Sports venue in Al Bukayriyah, Saudi Arabia

Coordinates: 26.166127°N 43.654003°E

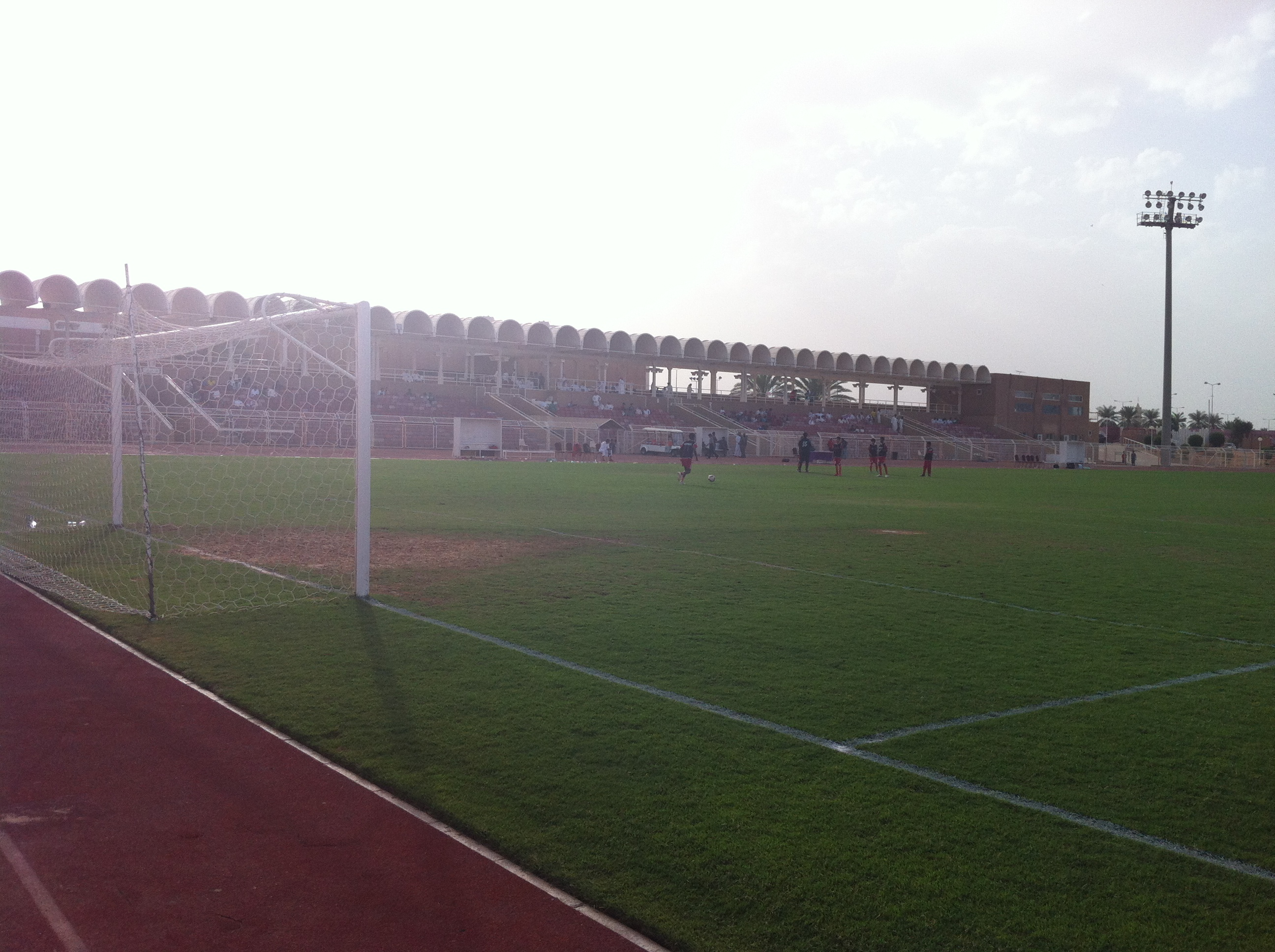
- Interactive map of Al-Bukiryah Club Stadium
- Full name: Al-Bukiryah Club Stadium
- Former names: Al-Amal Club Stadium
- Location: Al Bukayriyah, Saudi Arabia
- Owner: Ministry of Sports of Saudi Arabia
- Surface: Grass

Construction
- Opened: 1988
- Cost: 99.5 million SAR

Tenant
- Al-Bukiryah FC

Al-Bukiryah Club Stadium (Arabic: ملعب نادي البكيرية) is a multi-use stadium in Al Bukayriyah, Saudi Arabia. It is currently used mostly for football matches, on club level by Al-Bukiryah FC (Arabic: نادي البكيرية).

== Construction ==
Construction began in 1986 with a proposed cost of 99,500,000 SAR. The stadium finally opened its doors in 1988.

== Previous name(s) ==
This stadium was previously known as Al-Amal Club Stadium (Arabic: ملعب نادي الأمل) and was changed following the change of the club name to Al-Bukiryah FC (Arabic: نادي البكيرية).
