= Dudu Figueiredo =

Brazilian footballer (born 1991)

Personal information
- Full name: Luiz Eduardo Figueiredo
- Date of birth: 12 May 1991 (age 35)
- Place of birth: Curitiba, Brazil
- Height: 1.74 m (5 ft 8 1/2 in)
- Position: Attacking midfielder

Youth career
- –2011: Coritiba

Senior career*
Years	Team	Apps	(Gls)
2011–2016	Coritiba	48	(3)
2011	→ Oeste (loan)	1	(0)
2012	→ Rio Branco (loan)	12	(1)
2012–2013	→ Chapecoense (loan)	13	(1)
2015	→ Criciúma (loan)	16	(3)
2016–2019	Fluminense	9	(0)
2016	→ Náutico (loan)	12	(1)
2017–2018	→ Ohod (loan)	16	(3)
2018	→ Londrina (Loan)	20	(1)
2019–2020	Al-Tai	43	(21)
2020–2021	Dibba Al-Fujairah	0	(0)
2021–2022	Criciúma	35	(3)
2022	Al-Orobah	8	(1)
2023	Camboriú	22	(2)
2023–2024	Al-Kawkab		
- * Club domestic league appearances and goals as of 11 March 2020

Luiz Eduardo Figueiredo commonly known as Dudu Figueiredo (born 12 May 1991) is a Brazilian footballer who plays as an attacking midfielder.

== Career ==
Dudu began playing football in Coritiba's youth system. After a loan to Chapecoense, Dudu returned to play for Coritiba's senior side in September 2013.

On 27 August 2023, Dudu joined Al-Kawkab.

== Personal life ==
Dudu is brother of footballer Jean Lucas.
