= Mazyad Freeh =

Saudi Arabian footballer

Personal information
- Full name: Mazyad Freeh Al-Enezi
- Date of birth: July 6, 1989 (age 37)
- Place of birth: Hafar al-Batin
- Height: 1.77 m (5 ft 10 in)
- Position: Goalkeeper

Team information
- Current team: Al-Batin
- Number: 26

Youth career
- Al-Batin

Senior career*
Years	Team	Apps	(Gls)
2011–2022	Al-Batin		
2022–2023	Al-Jabalain	3	(0)
2023–2024	Al-Qadsiah	0	(0)
2024–2025	Al-Ula	3	(0)
2025–	Al-Batin	0	(0)
- * Club domestic league appearances and goals

Mazyad Freeh Al-Enezi (Arabic: مزيد فريح العنزي; born 6 July 1989) is a Saudi professional footballer who plays as a goalkeeper for Saudi club Al-Batin.

== Career ==
On 4 July 2022, Freeh joined First Division side Al-Jabalain. He departed Al-Batin after spending eleven years playing at the club. On 29 January 2023, Freeh joined Al-Qadsiah. On 6 February 2024, Freeh joined Third Division side Al-Ula. On 11 September 2025, Freeh returned to Al-Batin.

== Honours ==
Al-Batin

- First Division/MS League: 2019–20, runner-up 2015–16

Al-Ula

- Saudi Third Division: 2023–24
