= Seddik Majeri =

Tunisian footballer

Personal information
- Full name: Seddik Majeri
- Date of birth: 31 May 1994 (age 32)
- Place of birth: Djerba, Tunisia
- Height: 1.88 m (6 ft 2 in)
- Position: Defender

Team information
- Current team: US Ben Guerdane

Youth career
- Espérance

Senior career*
Years	Team	Apps	(Gls)
2014–2015	Espérance	0	(0)
2014–2015	→ AS Djerba (loan)	20	(0)
2015–2020	CA Bizertin	58	(5)
2019–2020	→ Al-Batin (loan)	28	(1)
2020–2021	Olympique Béja	2	(0)
2021–	US Ben Guerdane	0	(0)
- * Club domestic league appearances and goals

Seddik Majeri (born 31 May 1994) is a Tunisian footballer who currently plays as a defender for US Ben Guerdane.
