= Al-Ain FC (Saudi Arabia) =

Association football club in Saudi Arabia

Coordinates: 20°4′50.3″N 41°31′22.2″E

- Full name: Al-Ain Saudi Club
- Nicknames: Fares Al'Hejaz (Knight of Hejaz); Fakhr Al-Baha (Pride of the Al-Bahah Province).
- Founded: 1978; 48 years ago (as Zahran); 2001; 25 years ago (as Al-Ameed); 2013; 13 years ago (as Al-Ain).
- Ground: King Saud Sport City Stadium; Al-Bahah, Saudi Arabia
- Capacity: 10,000
- Chairman: Hassan bin Dabaj
- Manager: vacant
- League: Saudi Second Division League
- 2024–25: 16th of 18 (Saudi First Division League)
- Website: alainclub.sa

Al-Ain Saudi Club (Arabic: نادي العين بالأطاولة) is a Saudi Arabian professional football club based in Al-Atawlah, Al-Qara and Al-Bahah. The club play their home matches at the King Saud Sport City Stadium. The club competes in the Saudi First Division League, the second tier of Saudi football.

== History ==
The club was founded in 1978 under the name of Zahran Football Club. The club was named after the Zahran tribe who are one of the largest tribes in Al-Bahah Province. In 2001, the club changed their name to Al-Ameed Football Club before changing their name to Al-Ain in 2013. The club's name is inspired by UAE team Al Ain.

Al-Ain has won the Saudi Third Division title once in 2015–16, and finished as runner-up once in 2010–11. The club has won the Al-Bahah Regional League ten times. The club spent four non-consecutive seasons in the Saudi Second Division before advancing to the MS League in the 2017–18 season. They spent two consecutive seasons in the MS League before gaining promotion to the top tier of Saudi football for the first time at the end of the 2019–20 season. The club plays their home games at the King Saud Sport City Stadium in Al-Bahah, sharing the stadium with derby rivals Al-Hejaz.

== Honours ==
=== Domestic ===
- Saudi First Division/MS League
  - Third place (1): 2019–20
- Saudi Third Division
  - Winners (1): 2015–16
  - Runners-up (1): 2010–11

=== Regional ===
- Al-Bahah Regional League
  - Winners (10): 1981, 1998, 2000, 2001, 2004, 2005, 2006, 2009, 2010, 2011

== Current squad ==
As of 29 September 2021

Note: Flags indicate national team as defined under FIFA eligibility rules; some limited exceptions apply. Players may hold more than one non-FIFA nationality.

No.	Pos.	Nation	Player
5	DF	KSA	Yousef Al-Zahrani
6	MF	KSA	Ali Dabbaj
8	MF	KSA	Fawaz Al-Eisa
17	MF	KSA	Mohammed Al-Shahrani
21	DF	KSA	Aqeel Baalghyth
24	MF	KSA	Abdulmajeed Al-Thubaiti
33	GK	KSA	Sayaf Al-Qahtani
42	DF	KSA	Ahmed Soqan
88	MF	KSA	Muteb Al-Harbi
—	GK	KSA	Mazyad Freeh
—	GK	KSA	Bader Kabli (on loan from Al-Ahli)
—	DF	KSA	Naif Kariri
—	DF	BRA	Raphael Silva

No.	Pos.	Nation	Player
—	DF	KSA	Abdullah Othman
—	DF	KSA	Ayman Masrahi
—	MF	KSA	Hassan Majed
—	MF	KSA	Abdulelah Al-Ashwan
—	MF	FRA	Fedi Ben Choug
—	MF	BRA	Teco
—	MF	KSA	Mohammed Al Zubarah
—	MF	KSA	Abdulmajeed Al-Saeed
—	MF	KSA	Mohammed Al-Dossari
—	MF	KSA	Omar Al-Zahrani
—	FW	KSA	Khaled Al-Dossari
—	FW	KSA	Maher Hawsawi
—	FW	MAR	Adnane El Ouardy

== Coaching staff ==
Position	Name
Manager	(Portugal) Jorge Paixão
Assistant Manager	(Portugal) Hugo Relvas
Goalkeeper Coach	(Saudi Arabia) Yasser Al-Khaldi
Fitness Coach	(Portugal) Miguel Bragança
Video Analyst	(Saudi Arabia) Hussein Yaqoub
Sporting Director	(Saudi Arabia) Ziyad Al-Najei
Doctor	(Saudi Arabia) Mohammed Al-Nakhli
Physiotherapist	(Saudi Arabia) Nawaf Al-Zahrani
Administrative Coordinator	(Saudi Arabia) Abdullah Hakmi
Team Supervisor	(Saudi Arabia) Khaled Kahwaji

== Managerial history ==
- (Egypt) Bahaa Qebsisi (August 5, 2015 – November 5, 2016)
- (Egypt) Abbas Noureddine (November 11, 2016 – February 22, 2017)
- (Saudi Arabia) Hamood Al-Saiari (June 12, 2017 – December 3, 2017)
- (Tunisia) Mohammed Dahmane (December 8, 2017 – April 1, 2018)
- (Tunisia) Mohamed Al Maalej (May 3, 2018 – February 8, 2019)
- (Croatia) Alen Horvat (February 9, 2019 – May 20, 2019)
- (Tunisia) Habib Ben Romdhane (June 19, 2019 – September 22, 2020)
- (Germany) Michael Skibbe (October 12, 2020 – January 28, 2021)
- (Spain) Pablo Machín (January 31, 2021 – May 31, 2021)
- (Saudi Arabia) Hamood Al-Saiari (August 13, 2021 – October 27, 2021)
- (Saudi Arabia) Faisal Al-Ghamdi (caretaker) (October 27, 2021 – November 8, 2021)
- (Tunisia) Mohamed Mkacher (November 8, 2021 – June 1, 2022)
- (Tunisia) Mohammed Dahmane (August 11, 2022 – November 17, 2022)
- (France) Didier Gomes Da Rosa (November 17, 2022 – May 31, 2023)
- (Romania) Valeriu Tița (June 24, 2023 – November 9, 2023)
- (Serbia) Zoran Milinković (November 9, 2023 – June 1, 2024)
- (Portugal) Ricardo Sousa (August 15, 2024 – October 28, 2024)
- (Portugal) José Moreira (caretaker) (October 28, 2024 – October 31, 2024)
- (Algeria) Toufik Rouabah (October 31, 2024 – February 20, 2025)
- (Portugal) Jorge Paixão (February 21, 2025 – May 30, 2025)
- (Egypt) Ayman El Seraj (October 2, 2025 – December 14, 2025)
- (Jordan) Amjad Abu Tuaimeh (December 16, 2025 – March 15, 2026)
- (Tunisia) Ridha Jeddi (March 20, 2026 – April 18, 2026)
- (Saudi Arabia) Abdullah Al-Baqawi (April 18, 2026 – May 1, 2026)

== Presidential history ==
As of 1 January 2021.

No	Name	From	To
1	(Saudi Arabia) Mohammed Jamhour	1978	1978
2	(Saudi Arabia) Salem Ahmed Al-Zahrani	1979	1983
3	(Saudi Arabia) Awadh Al-Hilali	1984	1984
4	(Saudi Arabia) Salem Ahmed Al-Zahrani	1985	1990
5	(Saudi Arabia) Bakheet Al-Saher	1991	1991
6	(Saudi Arabia) Salem Ahmed Al-Zahrani	1992	1993
7	(Saudi Arabia) Fahad Al-Banmi	1994	1994
8	(Saudi Arabia) Abdulaziz Odah	1995	2006
9	(Saudi Arabia) Hamdan Saeed Hamdan	2007	2010
10	(Saudi Arabia) Mohammed Abdulrahman Al-Zahrani	2010	2018
11	(Saudi Arabia) Ali Bakheet Al-Zahrani	2018	2018
12	(Saudi Arabia) Mazen bin Raddad Al-Zahrani	2018	2021
13	(Saudi Arabia) Hassan bin Dabbaj Al-Zahrani	2021	2026

== See also ==
- List of football clubs in Saudi Arabia
