= Al-Qaisumah FC =

Association football club in Saudi Arabia

- Full name: Al-Qaisumah Football Club
- Nickname: Al Katiba Al Hamra (Red Battalion)
- Founded: 1970; 56 years ago
- Ground: Al-Batin Club Stadium
- Capacity: 6,000
- President: Saleh Al-Harbi
- Manager: Sabri Kaouech
- League: Saudi Third Division
- 2024-25: SDL, 16th of 16 Group B (relegated)
| Home colours | Away colours |

Al-Qaisumah Football Club (Arabic: نادي القيصومة لكرة القدم), is a Saudi Arabian football club that was formed in 1970 and is based in Qaisumah, Hafar al-Batin. The club plays in the Saudi First Division, which is the second tier of the Saudi Arabian football league system.

== Honours ==
- Saudi Second Division
  - Winners (1): 2015–16

Saudi Third Division

  - Winners (1): 2007–08
  - Runners-up (1): 2014–15

== Current squad ==
As of Saudi Third Division:

Note: Flags indicate national team as defined under FIFA eligibility rules; some limited exceptions apply. Players may hold more than one non-FIFA nationality.

| No. | Pos. | Nation | Player |
|---|---|---|---|
| 1 | GK | KSA | Redha Al-Shammari |
| 2 | MF | KSA | Saoud Al-Shammari |
| 3 | DF | KSA | Omar Satam |
| 5 | DF | KSA | Sultan Ghunaiman |
| 6 | MF | KSA | Abdulrahman Al-Dakheel |
| 7 | MF | KSA | Abdulsalam Fahad |
| 8 | MF | KSA | Abdulaziz Al-Omaim |
| 9 | FW | KSA | Abdulelah Al-Shammari |
| 10 | FW | KSA | Fahad Hadl |
| 11 | MF | KSA | Naif Al-Shammari |

| No. | Pos. | Nation | Player |
|---|---|---|---|
| 13 | DF | KSA | Mohanna Waqes |
| 14 | MF | KSA | Ahmed Maddad |
| 15 | FW | KSA | Abdulateef Al-Huraji |
| 16 | MF | KSA | Hathal Al-Harbi |
| 17 | DF | KSA | Mohammed Al-Shammari |
| 18 | DF | KSA | Yazid Al-Shammari |
| 19 | DF | KSA | Saleh Fallatah |
| 20 | DF | KSA | Majed Al-Harbi |
| 22 | GK | KSA | Hammad Al-Shammari |
| 30 | GK | KSA | Khuwailid Ayyadah |

== See also ==
- List of football clubs in Saudi Arabia
