= Al-Bukiryah FC =

Association football club in Saudi Arabia

Al-Bukiryah
- Full name: Al-Bukiryah Football Club
- Founded: 1962; 64 years ago
- Ground: Al-Bukiryah Club Stadium
- Chairman: Abdulrahman Al-Hudheif
- Head coach: Thomas Brdaric
- League: First Division League
- 2025–26: FDL, 11th of 18
- Website: albukiryahclub.com
Home colours	Away colours

Al-Bukiryah Football Club (Arabic: نادي البكيرية) is a Saudi Arabian football club based in Al Bukayriyah, Qassim. Founded in 1962, the club competes in the Saudi First Division, the second tier of Saudi football.

== History ==
The club was founded in 1962. The club was formerly known as Al-Amal Football Club (Arabic: نادي الأمل), however, on the 28th of August, 2018, the club name was changed to Al-Bukiryah FC (Arabic: نادي البكيرية) that we currently know.

== Stadium ==
Albukayriyah Stadium (Arabic: ملعب نادي البكيرية) is used as club's home ground.

== Coaching staff ==
Position	Name
Head coach	(Uruguay) Leonardo Ramos
Assistant coach	(Uruguay) Fabián Yantorno (Egypt) Mohsen Abdel Nasser
Goalkeeper coach	(Uruguay) Mathías Rolero
Fitness coach	(Uruguay) Diego Haro
Video analyst	(Saudi Arabia) Ibarhim Al-Ghanim
Doctor	(Saudi Arabia) Abdullah Al-Harbi
Physiotherapist	(Saudi Arabia) Abdulrahman Al-Ismaili
Interpreter	(Saudi Arabia) Hamed Ali
Kit manager	(Saudi Arabia) Sultan Al-Hazmi

== Current squad ==
As of Saudi First Division League :

Note: Flags indicate national team as defined under FIFA eligibility rules; some limited exceptions apply. Players may hold more than one non-FIFA nationality.

No.	Pos.	Nation	Player
2	DF	KSA	Abdulrahman Hawsawi
3	DF	KSA	Hattan Ahmed
4	DF	KSA	Bandar Baajaj
6	MF	KSA	Abdulrahman Al-Barakah
7	MF	KSA	Mohammed Al-Mahmoudi
8	MF	NED	Hicham Faik
10	MF	KSA	Nasser Kaabi
11	FW	KSA	Saad Al-Muwallad
13	MF	KSA	Ibrahim Al-Sonaitan
15	FW	KSA	Azzam Al-Bishi
17	GK	KSA	Mansour Jawhar
18	DF	KSA	Meshaal Sané
19	DF	ARG	Fernando Piñero

No.	Pos.	Nation	Player
21	FW	KSA	Abdullah Al-Dossari
23	DF	KSA	Mousa Al-Harbi
34	MF	NED	Yassine Zakir
36	DF	KSA	Hazza Assiri
38	MF	KSA	Yazeed Jathmi
45	GK	KSA	Motaz Akjah
66	DF	KSA	Rayan Sharahili
70	FW	NGR	Aremu Owolabi
90	FW	NGR	Isaac Success
99	FW	CUW	Brandley Kuwas
—	GK	KSA	Faisal Al-Shammari
—	DF	KSA	Manaf Abuyabes
—	DF	KSA	Hussain Al-Zabdani

== See also ==
- List of football clubs in Saudi Arabia
