= 2019–20 Prince Mohammad bin Salman League =

Prince Mohammad bin Salman League
- Season: 2019–20
- Dates: 20 August 2019 – 20 September 2020
- Champions: Al-Batin
- Promoted: Al-Batin; Al-Qadsiah; Al-Ain
- Relegated: Al-Mujazzal; Al-Taqadom; Al-Ansar; Hetten
- Matches: 380
- Goals: 975 (2.57 per match)
- Top goalscorer: Ousmane Barry (27 goals)
- Biggest home win: Al-Bukayriyah 7–1 Al-Nojoom (23 October 2019); Al-Qadsiah 6–0 Al-Ansar (15 January 2020); Al-Thoqbah 7–1 Hetten (18 February 2020)
- Biggest away win: Al-Taqadom 0–5 Ohod (13 November 2019)
- Highest scoring: Al-Bukayriyah 7–1 Al-Nojoom (23 October 2019); Al-Kawkab 3–5 Al-Qadsiah (5 February 2020); Al-Thoqbah 7–1 Hetten (18 February 2020); Hetten 3–5 Al-Qadsiah (5 September 2020)
- Longest winning run: 6 matches Al-Qadsiah; Ohod
- Longest unbeaten run: 13 matches Al-Ain
- Longest winless run: 13 matches Al-Taqadom
- Longest losing run: 6 matches Al-Nojoom; Hetten
- All statistics correct as of 20 September 2020.

The 2019–20 Prince Mohammad bin Salman League was the third season of the Prince Mohammad bin Salman League under its current name, and 43rd season of the Saudi First Division since its establishment in 1976. The season started on 20 August 2019 and concluded on 20 September 2020. Fixtures for the 2019–20 season were announced on 14 July 2019. Al-Batin won the title, with Al-Qadsiah and Al-Ain following in second and third respectively.

On 7 March 2020, the Ministry of Sports announced that all matches would be played behind closed doors until further notice. On 14 March 2020, the Ministry suspended all sports competitions indefinitely due to the COVID-19 pandemic in Saudi Arabia. On 11 June 2020, the Ministry of Sports announced the resumption of sports activities with training starting on 21 June and games starting after 4 August 2020 and played behind closed doors. On 1 July 2020, the schedule for the remaining matches was released. It was announced that the league would resume on 4 August 2020 and end on 20 September 2020.

== Overview ==
=== Rule changes ===
On 9 June 2019, the SAFF announced that the numbers of foreign players were decreased from 7 players to 4 players.

== Teams ==
A total of 20 teams are contesting the league, including 13 sides from the 2018–19 season, 4 promoted teams from the Second Division and the three relegated sides from the Pro League.

The first team to be relegated to the MS League was Ohod, ending a 2-year stay in the Pro League following a 3–1 home defeat to Al-Fayha on 12 April 2019. The second team to be relegated was Al-Batin, ending a 3-year stay in the Pro League following a 1–0 home defeat to an already relegated Ohod side on 11 May 2019. The third and final team to be relegated was Al-Qadsiah, who were relegated on the final matchday following a 2–2 home draw with Al-Hazem. Al-Qadsiah were relegated after 4 consecutive seasons in the Pro League.

The first club to be promoted was Al-Bukayriyah who were promoted following a 1–1 away draw against Al-Jandal on 16 March 2019. The second club to be promoted was Hetten following a 2–0 home win against Afif on 29 March 2019. The third club to be promoted was Al-Thoqbah who were promoted following a 3–1 home win against Arar on 29 March 2019. The fourth and final club to be promoted was Al-Taqadom who were promoted on the final matchday following a 3–0 home win against Al-Muzahimiyyah.

Hetten were promoted as the winners of the Second Division and Al-Bukayriyah were promoted as the runners-up. Al-Thoqbah defeated Al-Taqadom in the third-place playoffs.

Al-Bukayriyah, Al-Taqadom, and Al-Thoqbah will play in the Prince Mohammad bin Salman League for the first time in their history. Hetten will play in their 8th overall season in the MS League. This will be their first season in the MS League following their relegation in the 2014–15 season.

== Team changes ==
The following teams have changed division since the 2019–20 season.

=== To MS League ===
Promoted from Second Division

- Hetten
- Al-Bukayriyah
- Al-Thoqbah
- Al-Taqadom

Relegated from Pro League

- Al-Qadsiah
- Al-Batin
- Ohod

=== From MS League ===
Promoted to Pro League

- Abha
- Damac
- Al-Adalah

Relegated to Second Division

- Al-Qaisumah
- Hajer
- Al-Washm
- Al-Orobah

== Stadia and locations ==
Locations of teams in the 2017–18 Saudi First Division

Team	Location	Stadium	Capacity
Al-Ain	Al-Atawilah	King Saud Sport City Stadium (Al Bahah)	10,000
Al-Ansar	Medina	Al-Ansar Club Stadium	5,000
Al-Batin	Hafar al-Batin	Al-Batin Club Stadium	6,000
Al-Bukayriyah	Al Bukayriyah	Al-Bukayriyah Club Stadium	3,000
Al-Jabalain	Ha'il	Prince Abdul Aziz bin Musa'ed Stadium	12,000
Al-Jeel	Al-Hasa	Prince Abdullah bin Jalawi Stadium	26,000
Al-Kawkab	Al-Kharj	Al-Shoulla Club Stadium	5,200
Al-Khaleej	Saihat	Al-Khaleej Club Stadium	10,000
Al-Mujazzal	Al-Majma'ah	Al-Majma'ah City Stadium	7,000
Al-Nahda	Dammam	Prince Fahd bin Salman Stadium	15,000
Al-Nojoom	Al-Hasa	Prince Abdullah bin Jalawi Stadium	26,000
Al-Qadsiah	Khobar	Prince Saud bin Jalawi Stadium	15,000
Al-Shoulla	Al-Kharj	Al-Shoulla Club Stadium	5,200
Al-Tai	Ha'il	Prince Abdul Aziz bin Musa'ed Stadium	12,000
Al-Taqadom	Al Mithnab	Al-Najma Club Stadium (Unaizah)	3,000
Al-Thoqbah	Khobar	Prince Saud bin Jalawi Stadium	15,000
Hetten	Samtah	King Faisal Sport City Stadium (Jizan)	10,000
Jeddah	Jeddah	Reserve Stadium in King Abdullah Sports City	1,000
Najran	Najran	Najran Sport City Stadium	18,000
Ohod	Medina	Prince Mohammed bin Abdul Aziz Stadium	24,000

1: Al-Jeel and Al-Nojoom also use Al-Fateh Club Stadium (7,000 seats) as a home stadium.
2: Al-Nahda, Al-Qadsiah and Al-Thoqbah also use Prince Mohamed bin Fahd Stadium (35,000 seats) as a home stadium.

=== Foreign players ===
The number of foreign players is limited to 4 per team.

Players name in bold indicates the player is registered during the mid-season transfer window.

Club	Player 1	Player 2	Player 3	Player 4	Former Players
Al-Ain	(Ivory Coast) Soualio Ouattara	(Nigeria) Peter Nworah	(Tunisia) **Haythem Jouini**	(Tunisia) **Youssef Fouzai**	(Morocco) Yassine Lakhal (Guinea) Aboubacar Sylla
Al-Ansar	(Algeria) Hamza Aït Ouamar	(Brazil) **Baraka**	(Ghana) **Richard Baffour**		(Brazil) Ricardinho (Kenya) David Ochieng (Morocco) Marouane Fakhr (Zambia) Saith Sakala
Al-Batin	(Ivory Coast) Lassina Diaby	(Libya) Bader Hassan	(Tunisia) Mehdi Ressaissi	(Tunisia) Seddik Majeri	
Al-Bukayriyah	(Ivory Coast) **Martial Yao**	(Guinea) Ousmane Barry	(Nigeria) Okiemute Odah	(Tunisia) Mahmoud Ben Salah	(Nigeria) Paul Onobi
Al-Jabalain	(Brazil) Carlão	(Brazil) Diego Miranda	(Brazil) **Pitty**	(Portugal) **António Filipe**	(Algeria) Hacène Ogbi (Georgia (country)) Zurab Tsiskaridze
Al-Jeel	(Brazil) Francisco Pereira	(Brazil) Sidevaldo Pereira	(Tunisia) **Houssem Tabboubi**	(Tunisia) Yassine Boufalgha	(Brazil) Douglas Caé
Al-Kawkab	(Ghana) **Emmanuel Banahene**	(Tunisia) Chaker Rguiî			(Morocco) Youness Lacchab (Panama) Sergio Moreno (Tunisia) Chiheb Jebali (Tunisia) Mohamed Houssem Slimène
Al-Khaleej	(Algeria) **Zakaria Haddouche**	(Republic of the Congo) Ulrich Kapolongo	(Ghana) **Latif Amadu**	(Ghana) Samuel Sarfo	(Brazil) Victor Golas (Mauritania) Bessam
Al-Mujazzal	(Cameroon) **Ronald Ngah**	(Syria) **Mahmoud Al-Youssef**			(Algeria) Hocine El Orfi (Algeria) Hossin Lagoun (Angola) Alexander Christovão (Brazil) Abuda (Brazil) Cléber Prado (Brazil) Jefferson Baiano (Ivory Coast) Mamadou Konaté (France) Chris Gadi
Al-Nahda	(Mali) Cheibane Traoré	(Tunisia) Alaeddine Abbès	(Tunisia) Hachem Abbès	(Tunisia) Lassaâd Jaziri	
Al-Nojoom	(Brazil) Wesley Motuca	(Guinea) **Tafsir Chérif**	(Honduras) **Franco Güity**	(Senegal) **Ousmane Faye**	(Brazil) Douglas da Silva Cruz (Brazil) Gugu Vieira (Brazil) Wesley Santos
Al-Qadsiah	(Australia) Jack Duncan	(Australia) Rhys Williams	(Bahrain) **Mahdi Al-Humaidan**	(Nigeria) Stanley Ohawuchi	(Republic of Ireland) Andy Keogh
Al-Shoulla	(Ivory Coast) Mamadou Soro	(Ivory Coast) Sylla Daouda	(Ghana) **Abdulwahab Annan**	(Nigeria) **Isah Aliyu**	(Tunisia) Amine Mhadhebi (Tunisia) Khaled Gharsellaoui
Al-Tai	(Algeria) Kheireddine Boussouf	(Cameroon) **Patrick Mevoungou**			(Brazil) Dudu (Brazil) Pitty (Brazil) Jorge Silva (Honduras) Eddie Hernández
Al-Taqadom	(Ivory Coast) **Guillaume Daho**	(Egypt) Mahmoud El Ghazali	(Egypt) **Shehab El-Din Ahmed**	(Trinidad and Tobago) **Lester Peltier**	(Ivory Coast) Alain Zoe (Egypt) Gaber Salem (Niger) Ousmane Diabaté
Al-Thoqbah	(Mali) Ichaka Diarra	(Tunisia) Amir Omrani	(Tunisia) **Oussema Amdouni**		(Burkina Faso) Moïse Zongo (Brazil) Lucas Michel (Senegal) Boubacar Cissokho (Tunisia) Tarek Kodhai
Hetten	(Brazil) **Diego Lima**	(Croatia) **Jurica Buljat**	(Ghana) **Ishmael Yartey**	(Nigeria) **Macauley Chrisantus**	(Brazil) Pingo (Senegal) Abdoulaye Ba (Tunisia) Houssem Tabboubi (Tunisia) Mossaâb Sassi (Tunisia) Slim Bacha
Jeddah	(Ivory Coast) Ibrahim Diomandé	(France) Helton	(Gabon) Johann Lengoualama	(The Gambia) Modou Jobe	(Uganda) Hassan Wasswa
Najran	(Brazil) Carlos Coppetti	(Brazil) Carlos Henrique	(Cameroon) **Oumarou Kaina**	(Nigeria) **Gbolahan Salami**	(Brazil) Patrick Vieira (Mali) Boubacar Diarra (Syria) Shadi Al Hamwi
Ohod	(Algeria) Abderaouf Natèche	(Algeria) **Hacène Ogbi**	(Tunisia) **Chiheb Zoghlami**	(Tunisia) Houssem Eddine Sdiri	(Jordan) Baha' Abdel-Rahman (Norway) Muhamed Keita (Tunisia) Hichem Essifi

== League table ==
Pos	Team	Pld	W	D	L	GF	GA	GD	Pts	Promotion, qualification or relegation
1	Al-Batin (C, P)	38	22	10	6	52	28	+24	76	Promotion to the Pro League
2	Al-Qadsiah (P)	38	21	12	5	71	38	+33	75	Promotion to the Pro League
3	Al-Ain (P)	38	19	15	4	57	29	+28	72	Promotion to the Pro League
4	Al-Bukayriyah	38	17	13	8	65	41	+24	64	
5	Al-Nahda	38	16	12	10	55	47	+8	60	
6	Ohod	38	15	12	11	51	42	+9	57 (Note: Ohod finished ahead of Al-Jabalain on head-to-head goal difference: Al-Jabalain 1–3 Ohod, Ohod 0–1 Al-Jabalain.)	
7	Al-Jabalain	38	15	12	11	56	39	+17	57	
8	Jeddah	38	15	9	14	49	49	0	54	
9	Al-Thoqbah	38	14	11	13	61	46	+15	53	
10	Al-Tai	38	12	12	14	40	38	+2	48 (Note: Al-Tai finished ahead of Najran on overall goal difference: Al-Tai +2, Najran –2 (Al-Tai 0–2 Najran, Najran 1–3 Al-Tai).)	
11	Najran	38	12	12	14	49	51	−2	48	
12	Al-Shoulla	38	11	14	13	43	44	−1	47	
13	Al-Jeel	38	12	10	16	38	52	−14	46	
14	Al-Kawkab	38	11	12	15	39	47	−8	45	
15	Al-Khaleej	38	10	14	14	45	50	−5	44	
16	Al-Nojoom	38	10	11	17	44	62	−18	41	
17	Al-Mujazzal (R)	38	11	6	21	37	64	−27	39	Relegation to the Second Division
18	Al-Taqadom (R)	38	10	8	20	42	66	−24	38	Relegation to the Second Division
19	Al-Ansar (R)	38	9	8	21	34	62	−28	35	Relegation to the Second Division
20	Hetten (R)	38	8	7	23	47	80	−33	31	Relegation to the Second Division

Updated to match(es) played on 20 September 2020. Source: goalzz.com
Rules for classification: 1) Points; 2) Head-to-head points; 3) Head-to-head goal difference; 4) Total goal difference; 5) Total goals scored; 6) Fair-play points (Note: Head-to-head record is used only after all the matches between the teams in question have been played).
(C) Champions; (P) Promoted; (R) Relegated

=== Positions by round ===
The table lists the positions of teams after each week of matches. In order to preserve chronological evolvements, any postponed matches are not included in the round at which they were originally scheduled but added to the full round they were played immediately afterward.

Team ╲ Round	1	2	3	4	5	6	7	8	9	10	11	12	13	14	15	16	17	18	19	20	21	22	23	24	25	26	27	28	29	30	31	32	33	34	35	36	37	38
Al-Batin	20	10	5	7	8	4	8	8	7	4	4	5	5	5	5	3	3	2	2	2	3	2	3	4	4	3	2	2	2	2	2	1	1	1	1	1	1	1
Al-Qadsiah	5	1	1	1	1	1	1	1	1	1	1	1	2	2	2	1	2	3	3	3	2	3	2	3	3	4	4	5	3	3	3	3	3	3	3	3	2	2
Al-Ain	6	5	3	5	2	2	6	6	5	3	3	2	1	1	1	2	1	1	1	1	1	1	1	1	1	2	1	1	1	1	1	2	2	2	2	2	3	3
Al-Bukayriyah	16	15	15	10	6	3	7	9	9	8	7	4	4	3	3	4	6	9	7	6	5	5	5	5	6	5	5	3	4	4	4	4	4	4	4	4	4	4
Al-Nahda	4	9	14	16	18	16	10	4	4	6	5	7	7	6	6	8	5	7	8	8	6	6	6	6	5	6	6	6	6	6	6	6	6	6	6	6	6	5
Ohod	13	17	18	13	14	10	5	5	8	11	11	6	9	10	10	7	11	8	4	4	4	4	4	2	2	1	3	4	5	5	5	5	5	5	5	5	5	6
Al-Jabalain	12	13	17	11	10	11	9	11	11	10	9	9	6	7	7	6	4	6	11	10	8	8	7	7	7	7	7	8	9	10	10	9	9	10	9	7	7	7
Jeddah	9	18	19	19	20	15	13	16	18	16	12	14	11	13	13	9	10	11	9	9	9	10	8	9	9	9	8	7	7	7	7	8	8	8	7	8	8	8
Al-Thoqbah	14	3	6	8	9	5	2	3	2	2	2	3	3	4	4	5	8	5	5	5	7	7	10	8	8	8	9	9	8	8	8	7	7	7	8	9	9	9
Al-Tai	3	8	4	2	4	6	3	2	3	5	8	10	12	8	8	10	7	4	6	7	10	9	11	12	12	12	12	12	10	9	9	11	11	9	10	10	11	10
Najran	8	11	11	14	13	14	15	10	10	9	10	13	13	11	11	12	12	13	13	15	13	12	12	11	10	11	10	11	12	12	12	12	12	12	12	12	12	11
Al-Shoulla	18	16	9	12	11	12	14	12	14	12	13	11	8	9	9	11	9	10	10	11	12	11	9	10	11	10	11	10	11	11	11	10	10	11	11	11	10	12
Al-Jeel	2	4	8	4	7	8	12	13	12	14	15	12	14	15	16	16	17	16	15	12	14	13	13	13	13	13	13	13	13	13	13	13	14	13	15	13	13	13
Al-Kawkab	1	2	2	6	3	7	4	7	6	7	6	8	10	12	12	13	13	14	14	13	11	14	15	14	14	15	15	15	14	14	14	14	13	15	13	14	15	14
Al-Khaleej	7	14	7	3	5	9	11	14	15	17	16	17	16	14	15	15	15	12	12	14	15	15	14	15	15	14	14	14	15	15	15	15	15	14	14	15	14	15
Al-Nojoom	10	12	16	18	17	20	20	20	20	20	20	20	19	18	18	19	18	19	19	20	20	20	20	19	20	19	17	18	19	19	19	18	17	18	19	18	16	16
Al-Mujazzal	11	19	20	20	16	19	19	19	19	19	19	19	20	20	20	20	20	20	20	19	19	19	19	20	19	18	19	17	17	17	18	19	20	19	18	17	18	17
Al-Taqadom	17	20	12	17	19	18	16	15	13	15	17	18	18	19	19	17	16	17	16	16	17	17	17	17	17	20	20	20	20	20	20	20	19	17	17	16	17	18
Al-Ansar	19	7	13	9	12	13	17	17	16	13	14	16	17	16	14	14	14	15	17	18	18	18	18	18	18	16	16	16	16	16	16	16	16	16	16	19	19	19
Hetten	15	6	10	15	15	17	18	18	17	18	18	15	15	17	17	18	19	18	18	17	16	16	16	16	16	17	18	19	18	18	17	17	18	20	20	20	20	20

Leader
Promotion to the Pro League
Relegation to the Second Division

Updated to match(es) played on 20 September 2020. Source:

== Results ==
Home \ Away	AIN	ANS	BAT	BUK	JAB	JEL	KAW	KHJ	MUJ	NAH	NOJ	QAD	SHO	TAI	TAQ	THO	HET	JED	NAJ	OHD
Al-Ain		3–0	0–0	0–2	2–1	4–0	0–0	2–1	2–0	6–1	2–0	0–1	1–0	1–0	3–1	1–1	2–1	1–0	1–1	2–0
Al-Ansar	2–1		1–0	0–1	1–1	0–2	2–0	1–1	0–1	2–2	1–2	0–1	0–1	1–1	1–1	1–2	0–1	3–0	0–2	0–2
Al-Batin	0–0	2–0		3–1	0–0	2–1	1–1	1–0	2–0	1–0	4–1	1–0	3–1	2–1	1–0	2–0	1–0	1–1	3–1	1–1
Al-Bukayriyah	1–1	2–0	1–1		1–0	2–1	5–0	0–2	2–3	2–1	7–1	3–3	3–1	1–2	2–0	2–0	0–1	1–3	3–1	1–0
Al-Jabalain	2–2	2–3	2–2	1–1		2–0	0–1	1–3	4–0	0–0	2–1	0–0	1–0	1–0	1–2	2–1	3–0	3–0	1–1	1–3
Al-Jeel	1–1	2–1	0–2	2–2	2–2		1–0	0–2	2–0	1–0	0–0	2–2	0–1	1–0	2–0	2–1	0–0	1–2	1–2	0–2
Al-Kawkab	1–1	1–0	2–0	0–0	0–2	2–2		0–1	0–1	0–1	0–0	3–5	1–1	1–0	2–1	1–1	5–2	1–2	0–0	2–2
Al-Khaleej	0–0	2–2	0–2	0–0	2–1	2–0	4–3		0–1	0–0	0–0	1–3	0–0	1–1	1–2	0–1	1–3	2–1	2–3	1–3
Al-Mujazzal	0–1	0–1	1–2	1–2	0–4	2–1	0–2	1–1		2–1	1–5	0–1	4–1	1–0	2–3	0–1	0–1	1–0	3–1	1–3
Al-Nahda	2–2	1–2	2–0	3–1	2–2	2–0	2–1	1–0	3–3		1–2	3–0	2–2	0–2	3–1	4–1	2–1	2–2	2–0	2–1
Al-Nojoom	0–1	2–1	1–3	0–0	1–3	1–1	1–1	1–2	2–1	0–0		0–2	1–3	1–0	1–0	0–2	1–1	1–1	0–2	4–0
Al-Qadsiah	2–2	6–0	3–1	1–1	2–1	5–1	1–0	1–1	3–1	1–3	3–2		3–2	0–1	3–0	0–0	2–0	1–1	1–1	5–1
Al-Shoulla	0–1	0–3	0–0	0–0	1–1	2–1	2–0	0–2	1–1	0–0	1–0	0–0		5–0	3–1	1–1	3–1	1–2	2–2	2–3
Al-Tai	1–1	1–1	1–0	1–3	1–1	3–0	0–1	3–3	3–0	0–0	2–1	0–1	0–0		2–1	0–0	5–0	1–2	0–2	1–1
Al-Taqadom	1–1	3–0	0–1	0–4	2–1	1–2	1–1	2–2	1–2	1–1	1–1	1–3	1–0	1–1		1–3	5–2	1–0	0–1	0–5
Al-Thoqbah	0–2	5–1	2–1	4–2	1–2	1–2	2–1	1–1	1–1	5–1	2–3	0–1	1–2	0–1	2–0		7–1	1–1	0–0	0–0
Hetten	2–2	5–0	1–2	1–3	0–3	0–1	2–0	1–1	3–0	0–1	1–3	3–5	2–2	1–1	0–1	2–5		2–1	2–2	2–3
Jeddah	3–2	2–0	1–2	1–1	1–0	1–1	0–2	1–0	1–1	2–1	3–2	2–0	1–0	0–1	2–0	0–3	5–2		1–2	0–1
Najran	0–1	0–0	1–1	1–1	0–1	0–2	1–2	4–1	3–1	1–2	2–2	0–0	0–1	1–3	2–3	4–3	1–0	3–2		0–1
Ohod	1–2	1–3	0–1	1–1	0–1	0–0	0–1	3–2	0–0	0–1	5–0	0–0	1–1	1–0	2–2	0–0	1–0	1–1	2–1	

Updated to match(es) played on 20 September 2020. Source: goalzz.com
Legend: Blue = home team win; Yellow = draw; Red = away team win.

=== Season progress ===
Team ╲ Round	1	2	3	4	5	6	7	8	9	10	11	12	13	14	15	16	17	18	19	20	21	22	23	24	25	26	27	28	29	30	31	32	33	34	35	36	37	38
Al-Ain	W	D	W	D	W	D	L	D	W	W	D	W	W	D	L	D	W	W	W	W	W	D	D	D	W	D	W	W	D	D	W	L	W	D	W	W	L	D
Al-Ansar	L	W	L	W	L	D	L	L	D	W	D	L	L	W	W	D	L	L	L	L	L	D	L	L	L	W	W	W	L	D	L	W	L	D	D	L	L	L
Al-Batin	L	W	W	D	D	W	L	D	W	D	W	W	W	L	D	W	W	W	W	D	L	W	D	D	W	W	W	L	W	D	W	W	W	W	W	L	W	D
Al-Bukayriyah	L	D	D	W	W	W	L	L	D	W	D	W	W	D	W	D	L	L	L	W	W	D	W	W	D	W	W	W	D	W	L	D	L	D	W	D	W	D
Al-Jabalain	D	D	L	W	D	D	W	L	D	W	D	D	W	D	L	W	W	L	L	W	W	L	W	D	W	D	D	L	L	L	D	W	L	L	W	W	W	W
Al-Jeel	W	D	D	W	L	D	L	D	D	L	D	W	L	L	W	L	L	W	D	W	L	W	L	W	L	D	D	W	D	L	L	L	L	W	L	W	W	L
Al-Kawkab	W	W	D	L	W	L	W	L	W	L	D	D	L	D	W	D	L	L	L	D	W	L	L	D	D	L	L	L	W	D	D	D	W	L	W	D	L	W
Al-Khaleej	D	D	W	W	D	L	L	L	L	D	D	L	D	W	D	L	W	W	D	L	L	W	D	L	L	W	L	D	L	D	L	D	W	W	D	D	W	L
Al-Mujazzal	D	L	L	L	W	L	L	W	L	L	D	L	L	L	L	L	D	W	D	W	L	L	W	L	L	W	L	D	W	W	L	L	L	W	D	W	L	W
Al-Nahda	W	L	L	L	W	D	W	W	W	L	D	D	D	W	L	L	W	D	D	W	W	D	W	W	W	L	W	W	D	L	D	L	L	D	D	W	D	W
Al-Nojoom	D	D	L	L	D	L	L	D	L	L	W	D	D	W	L	L	W	L	L	L	L	L	D	W	L	W	D	L	D	D	D	W	W	L	L	W	W	W
Al-Qadsiah	W	W	D	W	L	W	W	W	W	D	D	D	D	D	W	W	L	L	D	W	W	D	W	L	W	D	D	D	W	W	L	D	W	W	W	W	W	W
Al-Shoulla	L	D	W	D	D	L	D	W	L	D	D	W	W	D	D	D	W	D	D	L	L	W	W	L	L	W	L	W	L	W	D	W	L	L	L	D	D	L
Al-Tai	W	L	W	W	L	D	W	W	L	L	L	L	D	W	L	D	W	W	W	L	L	D	L	D	L	L	D	W	W	W	D	D	D	D	D	L	L	D
Al-Taqadom	L	L	W	L	L	D	W	D	W	L	L	L	L	L	W	W	W	L	L	L	L	D	L	D	L	L	L	L	L	D	D	W	W	W	D	W	L	D
Al-Thoqbah	D	W	D	D	D	W	W	L	W	W	D	L	W	L	L	D	L	W	W	D	D	L	L	W	W	L	D	D	W	L	W	D	W	L	L	L	L	W
Hetten	L	W	L	L	D	L	L	W	D	D	D	W	L	L	L	L	L	W	W	L	W	D	L	L	L	L	L	L	W	L	W	L	D	D	L	L	L	L
Jeddah	D	L	D	L	L	W	W	L	L	W	W	D	W	D	D	W	D	L	W	W	D	L	W	L	W	L	W	W	D	L	W	L	W	L	D	L	W	L
Najran	D	D	D	L	W	D	D	W	D	W	L	L	D	W	W	D	L	L	L	L	W	W	L	W	W	L	W	L	L	D	W	D	L	D	L	L	W	D
Ohod	D	L	D	W	D	W	W	D	L	D	D	W	L	D	W	W	L	W	W	D	W	W	W	W	W	W	L	L	L	W	D	D	L	D	D	L	L	L

Updated to match(es) played on 20 September 2020. Source:
W = Win; D = Draw; L = Lose

== Statistics ==
As of 20 September 2020

=== Scoring ===
==== Top scorers ====
Rank	Player	Club	Goals
1	(Guinea) Ousmane Barry	Al-Bukayriyah	27
2	(Nigeria) Stanley Ohawuchi	Al-Qadsiah	24
3	(Mali) Cheibane Traoré	Al-Nahda	21
4	(Brazil) Carlão	Al-Jabalain	17
4	(Saudi Arabia) Hassan Sharahili	Al-Batin	17
4	(Saudi Arabia) Abdullah Hadhereti	Al-Taqadom/Al-Qadsiah	17
7	(Ivory Coast) Mamadou Soro	Al-Shoulla	16
7	(Ivory Coast) Ibrahim Sory	Jeddah	16
9	(Brazil) Dudu	Al-Tai	13
9	(Tunisia) Amir Omrani	Al-Thoqbah	13

==== Hat-tricks ====
Player	For	Against	Result	Date	Ref.
(Saudi Arabia) Bader Al-Khamees	Al-Thoqbah	Hetten	5–2 (A)	25 September 2019	
(Nigeria) Peter Nworah	Al-Ain	Al-Nahda	6–1 (H)	23 October 2019	
(Saudi Arabia) Islam Seraj	Al-Shoulla	Al-Tai	5–0 (H)	12 November 2019	
(Brazil) Dudu	Al-Tai	Hetten	5–0 (H)	26 November 2019	
(Saudi Arabia) Abdullah Hadhereti	Al-Qadsiah	Al-Ansar	6–0 (H)	15 January 2020	
(Ivory Coast) Ibrahim Sory	Jeddah	Hetten	5–2 (H)	3 March 2020	
(Saudi Arabia) Abdullah Hadhereti	Al-Qadsiah	Ohod	5–1 (H)	8 August 2020	
(Honduras) Franco Güity	Al-Nojoom	Al-Mujazzal	5–1 (A)	27 August 2020	
(Ivory Coast) Guillaume Nicaise Daho	Al-Taqadom	Hetten	5–2 (H)	10 September 2020	
(Saudi Arabia) Mohammed Al-Harthi	Al-Jabalain	Jeddah	3–0 (H)	20 September 2020	
(Nigeria) Stanley Ohawuchi	Al-Qadsiah	Al-Jeel	5–1 (H)	20 September 2020	
(Saudi Arabia) Yazid Al-Jumaiaah	Al-Kawkab	Hetten	5–2 (H)	20 September 2020	

Note

(H) – Home; (A) – Away

=== Clean sheets ===
Rank	Player	Club	Clean sheets
1	(Saudi Arabia) Mohammed Mazyad	Al-Ain	17
2	(Saudi Arabia) Mazyad Freeh	Al-Batin	16
3	(Algeria) Abderaouf Natèche	Ohod	13
3	(Nigeria) Okiemute Odah	Al-Bukayriyah	13
5	(Australia) Jack Duncan	Al-Qadsiah	12
5	(Saudi Arabia) Nawaf Al-Otaibi	Al-Nahda	12
7	(Algeria) Kheireddine Boussouf	Al-Tai	11
7	(Brazil) Francisco Pereira	Al-Jeel	11
9	(Saudi Arabia) Wadia Al-Obaid	Najran	9
9	(Saudi Arabia) Abdullah Al-Shammeri	Al-Kawkab	9
9	(Saudi Arabia) Mohammed Assiri	Al-Thoqbah	9
9	(Saudi Arabia) Saeed Al-Harbi	Al-Shoulla	9
9	(Portugal) António Filipe	Al-Jabalain	9

== See also ==
- 2019–20 Saudi Professional League
- 2019–20 Second Division
- 2020 King Cup
- 2019 Super Cup
