= 2017–18 Al-Batin F.C. season =

Al-Batin
2017–18 season
- President: Nasser Al-Huwaidi
- Manager: Quim Machado (until 4 February 2018); Ciprian Panait (from 6 February 2018)
- Stadium: Al-Batin Club Stadium
- SPL: 11th
- King Cup: Semi-finals
- Crown Prince Cup: Round of 16
- Top goalscorer: League: Jorge Silva (11); All: Jorge Silva (12)
- Highest home attendance: 6,500 vs Al-Ahli (22 September 2017)
- Lowest home attendance: 832 vs Al-Fayha (12 April 2017)
- Average home league attendance: 2,689
Home colours	Away colours
- All statistics correct as of 12 April 2018.

The 2017–18 season was Al-Batin's second consecutive season in Pro League and their 39th year in existence. This season Al-Batin participated in the Pro League and King Cup. The season covered the period from 1 July 2017 to 30 June 2018.

== Players ==
=== Squad information ===
As of 20 January 2018

Note: Flags indicate national team as defined under FIFA eligibility rules; some limited exceptions apply. Players may hold more than one non-FIFA nationality.

No.	Pos.	Nation	Player
1	GK	KSA	Nasser Al-Mehaini
3	DF	KSA	Bander Nasser
4	MF	KSA	Maan Khodari
5	MF	KSA	Naif Eisa (Captain)
6	DF	KSA	Muteb Mansour
7	MF	KSA	Mohanna Waqes
8	MF	KSA	Mosaab Al-Otaibi
9	FW	BRA	Guilherme Schettine
10	MF	KSA	Jadaan Mohanna
12	FW	BRA	Jhonnattann Benites
14	MF	KSA	Khaled Dakheel
15	MF	KSA	Abdulmajeed Obaid
18	MF	KSA	Abdulmalek Al-Shammeri (on loan from Al-Shabab)
20	FW	KSA	Sahow Metlaq
21	MF	KSA	Majed Kanabah
23	MF	MLI	Ousmane Diabaté
24	MF	KSA	Waleed Al-Enezi (on loan from Al-Shabab)

No.	Pos.	Nation	Player
25	DF	KSA	Sultan Masrahi
26	GK	KSA	Mazyad Freeh
27	MF	KSA	Abdullah Al-Jouei
31	DF	KSA	Sultan Ghunaiman
36	MF	KSA	Hussein Halawani (on loan from Al-Ittihad)
42	GK	TUN	Aymen Mathlouthi
50	GK	KSA	Khowailed Ayyadah
66	MF	KSA	Khaled Al-Qattam
70	DF	NGA	Abdulshakour Hosawi (on loan from Hajer)
80	FW	KSA	Yousef Al-Mozairib
87	DF	BRA	Pitty
88	MF	KSA	Yasser Al-Fahmi
90	DF	KSA	Jamal Al-Dhefiri
92	MF	BRA	Tinga
99	FW	BRA	Jorge Silva
—	DF	SDN	Mohammed Bashir

== Transfers ==
=== In ===
Date	Pos.	Name	Previous club	Fee	Source
18 June 2017	DF	(Saudi Arabia) Sultan Masrahi	(Saudi Arabia) Al-Qadsiah	Free	
20 June 2017	DF	(Saudi Arabia) Yousef Khamees	(Saudi Arabia) Al-Fateh	Free	
22 June 2017	MF	(Saudi Arabia) Mosaab Al-Otaibi	(Saudi Arabia) Al-Faisaly	Free	
5 July 2017	MF	(Saudi Arabia) Majed Kanabah	Unattached	Free	
14 July 2017	MF	(Angola) Valdo Alhinho	(Latvia) Jelgava	Free	
19 July 2017	DF	(Iraq) Alaa Ali Mhawi	(Iraq) Al-Zawra'a	Free	
3 August 2017	DF	(Brazil) Pitty	(Brazil) Cuiabá	Free	
19 October 2017	MF	(Saudi Arabia) Khaled Al-Qattam	(Saudi Arabia) Al-Hilal	Free	
10 January 2018	DF	(Sudan) Mohammed Bashir	Unattached	Free	
12 January 2018	MF	(Brazil) Tinga	(Bolivia) Universitario de Sucre	Free	
12 January 2018	FW	(Brazil) Guilherme Schettine	(Brazil) Atlético Paranaense	Free	
16 January 2018	MF	(Saudi Arabia) Yasser Al-Fahmi	(Saudi Arabia) Al-Ahli	Free	
16 January 2018	FW	(Brazil) Jorge Santos Silva	Unattached	Free	
17 January 2018	MF	(Mali) Ousmane Diabaté	(Egypt) ENPPI	Free	
17 January 2018	FW	(Brazil) Willen	(Thailand) PT Prachuap	Free	
27 January 2018	GK	(Tunisia) Aymen Mathlouthi	(Tunisia) Étoile du Sahel	Free	

=== Loans in ===
Date	Pos.	Name	Parent club	End date	Source
2 July 2017	MF	(Saudi Arabia) Abdulmalek Al-Shammeri	(Saudi Arabia) Al-Shabab	End of season	
18 January 2018	MF	(Saudi Arabia) Hussein Halawani	(Saudi Arabia) Al-Ittihad	End of season	
20 January 2018	MF	(Saudi Arabia) Waleed Al-Enezi	(Saudi Arabia) Al-Shabab	End of season	
30 January 2018	DF	(Nigeria) Abdulshakour Hosawi	(Saudi Arabia) Hajer	End of season	

=== Out ===
Date	Pos.	Name	New club	Fee	Source
30 June 2017	DF	(Brazil) William Alves	(Brazil) Atlético Goianiense	Free	
30 June 2017	GK	(Saudi Arabia) Mansoor Al-Najai	Released		
30 June 2017	DF	(Saudi Arabia) Naif Mansor	Released		
18 July 2017	FW	(Saudi Arabia) Badr Bander	(Saudi Arabia) Al-Orobah	Free	
19 July 2017	FW	(Saudi Arabia) Mashari Al-Enezi	(Saudi Arabia) Al-Tai	Free	
8 August 2017	MF	(Saudi Arabia) Khaled Al-Zylaeei	(Saudi Arabia) Al-Raed	Free	
8 August 2017	DF	(Saudi Arabia) Majed Mansor	(Saudi Arabia) Al-Shoulla	Free	
29 September 2017	DF	(Iraq) Alaa Ali Mhawi	Released		
19 November 2017	FW	(Brazil) Jorge Santos Silva	Released		
23 November 2017	DF	(Saudi Arabia) Yousef Khamees	(Saudi Arabia) Khaleej	Free	
10 January 2017	MF	(Angola) Valdo Alhinho	Released		
18 January 2017	FW	(Brazil) Tarabai	Released		
1 February 2018	FW	(Brazil) Willen	(Saudi Arabia) Hajer	Free	

=== Loans out ===
Date	Pos.	Name	Subsequent club	End date	Source
3 August 2017	DF	(Saudi Arabia) Meshal Khalaf	(Saudi Arabia) Al-Tai	End of season	
11 August 2017	FW	(Saudi Arabia) Hassan Sharahili	(Saudi Arabia) Damac	End of season	

== Pre-season friendlies ==
11 July 2017 Friendly	Al-Taawoun (Saudi Arabia)	3–3	(Saudi Arabia) Al-Batin	Buraidah, Saudi Arabia
19:40 AST	Kamara 56'; Amissi 58', 71'		Al-Jouei 4'; Jorge Santos 33'; Jhonnattann 40'	Stadium: Al-Taawoun Club Stadium

15 July 2017 Friendly	Al-Batin (Saudi Arabia)	1–1	(Jordan) Al-Faisaly	Cairo, Egypt
19:00 AST	Tarabai	Report	Mendy

22 July 2017 Friendly	Telecom Egypt	0–0	(Saudi Arabia) Al-Batin	Cairo, Egypt
17:30 CAT

26 July 2017 Friendly	Ittihad El Shorta (Egypt)	2–3	(Saudi Arabia) Al-Batin	Cairo, Egypt
18:15 CAT	35'; 90'	Report	Jorge Santos 55'; Jhonnattann 62'; Ghunaiman 64'

30 July 2017 Friendly	Suez (Egypt)	2–0	(Saudi Arabia) Al-Batin	Cairo, Egypt
18:00 CAT	Khalal; Bahig	Report		Stadium: Mövenpick Stadium

4 August 2017 Friendly	Al-Faisaly (Saudi Arabia)	2–1	(Saudi Arabia) Al-Batin	Al Majma'ah, Saudi Arabia
19:30 AST	Al-Ghanam 90'; Al-Mansor 90+1'	Report	Jorge Santos 46'	Stadium: King Salman Sport City Stadium

26 August 2017 Friendly	Al-Nassr (Saudi Arabia)	1–0	(Saudi Arabia) Al-Batin	Riyadh, Saudi Arabia
19:05 AST	Leonardo 75'			Stadium: Prince Abdulrahman bin Saud Stadium

== Competitions ==
=== Overall ===
Competition	Started round	Current position / round	Final position / round	First match	Last match
Pro League	—	—	11th	11 August 2017	12 April 2018
King Cup	Round of 32	—	Semi-finals	5 January 2018	1 April 2018

Last Updated: 12 April 2018

=== Pro League ===
==== League table ====
Pos	Team	Pld	W	D	L	GF	GA	GD	Pts	Qualification or relegation
9	Al-Ittihad	26	8	9	9	34	41	−7	33	Qualification to AFC Champions League group stage (Note: Al-Ittihad qualified for the AFC Champions League group stage as 2018 King Cup winners.)
10	Al-Shabab	26	8	7	11	36	36	0	31 (Note: Al-Shabab finished ahead of Al-Batin on overall goal difference: Al-Shabab 0, Al-Batin –11 (Al-Shabab 1–2 Al-Batin, Al-Batin 0–1 Al-Shabab).)	
11	Al-Batin	26	8	7	11	35	46	−11	31	
12	Al-Qadsiah	26	6	7	13	28	41	−13	25	
13	Al-Raed (O)	26	5	9	12	43	53	−10	24	Qualification to relegation play-offs

Updated to match(es) played on 12 April 2018. Source: slstat.com
Rules for classification: 1) Points; 2) Head-to-head points; 3) Head-to-head goal difference; 4) Total goal difference; 5) Total goals scored; 6) Play-off (only for deciding champion, relegation and AFC competitions participation).
(O) Play-off winners

==== Results summary ====
Overall								Home						Away					
Pld	W	D	L	GF	GA	GD	Pts	W	D	L	GF	GA	GD	W	D	L	GF	GA	GD
26	8	7	11	35	46	−11	31	2	5	6	16	24	−8	6	2	5	19	22	−3

Last updated: 12 April 2018.
Source: Competitive matches

==== Results by round ====
Round	1	2	3	4	5	6	7	8	9	10	11	12	13	14	15	16	17	18	19	20	21	22	23	24	25	26
Ground	A	H	A	H	H	A	A	H	H	A	H	A	A	H	A	H	A	A	H	H	A	A	H	A	H	H
Result	W	W	W	L	D	W	L	L	D	D	D	W	L	L	D	L	L	L	D	L	L	W	L	W	W	D
Position	3	1	1	2	3	2	3	5	5	6	5	5	6	6	6	8	9	9	10	10	10	10	11	11	11	11

Updated to match(es) played on 12 April 2018. Source: Competitive matches
A = Away; H = Home; W = Win; D = Draw; L = Loss

==== Matches ====
All times are local, AST (UTC+3).

Win Draw Loss Postponed

11 August 2017 1	Al-Ittihad	1–3	Al-Batin	Jeddah
20:55	Al-Muziel (yellow card) 60'; Kahraba 88', (yellow card) 90+1'	Report	Tarabai 8', 68'; Khodari (yellow card) 45+1'; Jorge Silva 89'	Stadium: King Abdullah Sports City; Attendance: 17,018; Referee: Fahad Al-Mirdasi

18 August 2017 2	Al-Batin	2–0	Ohod	Hafar al-Batin
19:15	Jorge Silva (yellow card) 14', (goal) 36'; Khodari (yellow card) 45'; Jhonnattann 60'	Report	Assiri (yellow card) 30'	Stadium: Al-Batin Club Stadium; Attendance: 3,967; Referee: Mohammed Al-Qarni

15 September 2017 3	Al-Shabab	1–2	Al-Batin	Riyadh
18:40	Benlamri (yellow card) 50'; Belusso 90+1'	Report	Khodari (yellow card) 54'; Jhonnattann 60'; Kanabah (yellow card) 64'; Benlamri 85' (o.g.)	Stadium: Prince Faisal bin Fahd Stadium; Attendance: 767; Referee: Abdulrahman Al-Sultan

22 September 2017 4	Al-Batin	1–2	Al-Ahli	Hafar al-Batin
18:35	Alhinho (yellow card) 4'; Paulo 22'; Tarabai (yellow card) 44'; Masrahi (yellow card) 90+2'; Waqes (yellow card) 90+3'	Report	Al-Somah 18'; Oboabona (yellow card) 21'; Bakshween (yellow card) 86'; Hawsawi 90+5'	Stadium: Al-Batin Club Stadium; Attendance: 6,500; Referee: Fahad Al-Mirdasi

28 September 2017 5	Al-Batin	0–0	Al-Fateh	Hafar al-Batin
18:30		Report	Manoel (yellow card) 63'; Al-Ammar (yellow card) 70'	Stadium: Al-Batin Club Stadium; Attendance: 2,713; Referee: Sultan Al-Harbi

14 October 2017 6	Al-Ettifaq	1–3	Al-Batin	Dammam
17:55	Kiss (yellow card) 8'; Freeh 12' (o.g.); Callejón (yellow card) 80'; Al-Khaibari (yellow card) 88'	Report	Jhonnattann 35'; Nasser (yellow card) 52'; Kanabah (yellow card) 58'; Paulo 61'; Al-Shammeri (yellow card) 67'; Masrahi 69'	Stadium: Prince Mohamed bin Fahd Stadium; Attendance: 503; Referee: Khaled Al-Teris

21 October 2017 7	Al-Hilal	2–1	Al-Batin	Riyadh
19:55	Britos 62'; Rivas 90+5'	Report	Tarabai 70', (yellow card) 90+7'; Paulo (yellow card) 82'; Masrahi (yellow card) 84'; Alhinho (yellow card) 90+1'	Stadium: King Fahd International Stadium; Attendance: 15,675; Referee: Sultan Al-Harbi

26 October 2017 8	Al-Batin	1–5	Al-Raed	Hafar al-Batin
18:00	Jorge Silva 2'; Masrahi (yellow card) 52'	Report	Otaif 13'; Bangoura 19', 30', (yellow card) 90+1'; Amora 42'; Shikabala 67' (pen.)	Stadium: Al-Batin Club Stadium; Attendance: 1,217; Referee: Khaled Al-Teris

16 November 2017 10	Al-Qadsiah	0–0	Al-Batin	Khobar
17:30	Al-Shoeil (yellow card) 45'	Report	Kanabah (yellow card) 81'	Stadium: Prince Saud bin Jalawi Stadium; Attendance: 820; Referee: Svein Oddvar Moen (Norway)

25 November 2017 11	Al-Batin	1–1	Al-Taawoun	Hafar al-Batin
15:05	Khodari (yellow card) 19'; Obaid (yellow card) 45'; Tarabai 90+3'; Eisa (yellow card) 90+4'	Report	Al-Bishi 51'; Al-Maghrebi (yellow card) 64'; Hazazi (yellow card) 80'	Stadium: Al-Batin Club Stadium; Attendance: 1,217; Referee: Thorvaldur Árnason (Iceland)

30 November 2017 12	Al-Faisaly	0–1	Al-Batin	Al Majma'ah
17:45	Hyland (yellow card) 62'; Al-Sowayed (yellow card) 74'; Luisinho (yellow card) 80'; Al-Robeai (yellow card) 90+10'	Report	Jhonnattann 5', (yellow card) 81'; Waqes (yellow card) 7'; Freeh (yellow card) 48'; Nasser (yellow card) 78'	Stadium: King Salman Sport City Stadium; Attendance: 723; Referee: Adrien Jaccottet (Switzerland)

4 December 2017 9	Al-Batin	1–1	Al-Nassr	Hafar al-Batin
17:40	Jhonnattann 34'; Kanabah (yellow card) 36'; Nasser (yellow card) 40'	Report	Leonardo 42'; Khamis (yellow card) 68'; Ghaleb (yellow card) 71'; Ghaly (yellow card) 76'	Stadium: Al-Batin Club Stadium; Attendance: 2,437; Referee: Simon Lee Evans (Wales)

9 December 2017 13	Al-Fayha	2–0	Al-Batin	Al Majma'ah
15:10	Al-Salem 30'; Izaguirre (yellow card) 43'; Kanno (yellow card) 43'; Muath 74'	Report	Obaid (yellow card) 60'	Stadium: King Salman Sport City Stadium; Attendance: 364; Referee: Svein Oddvar Moen (Norway)

16 December 2017 14	Al-Batin	1–2	Al-Ittihad	Hafar al-Batin
17:45	Paulo 21', (yellow card) 45+1'; Kanabah (yellow card) 58'; Tarabai (yellow card) 84'	Report	Akaïchi 30'; Al-Aryani 84'	Stadium: Al-Batin Club Stadium; Attendance: 3,217; Referee: István Vad (Hungary)

22 December 2017 15	Ohod	1–1	Al-Batin	Medina
18:20	Al-Nakhli (yellow card) 16'; Hawsawi 81'; Al-Johani (yellow card) 86'; Al-Hafdhi (yellow card) 88'	Report	Al-Otaibi (yellow card) 61'; Al-Shammeri 72'; Al-Jouei (yellow card) 78'; Al-Muheeni (yellow card) 88'; Jhonnattann (yellow card) 90'; Kanabah (yellow card) 90'; Alhinho (yellow card) 90+3'	Stadium: Prince Mohammed bin Abdul Aziz Stadium; Attendance: 1,146; Referee: Abdulrahman Al-Sultan

27 December 2017 16	Al-Batin	0–1	Al-Shabab	Hafar al-Batin
17:50	Dakheel (yellow card) 14'; Ghunaiman (yellow card) 74'; Al-Shammeri (yellow card) 79'; Jhonnattann (yellow card) 83'	Report	Al-Shamrani 17'; Benlamri (yellow card) 86'; Ghazi (yellow card) 90+3'; Jaafer (yellow card) 90+5'	Stadium: Al-Batin Club Stadium; Attendance: 1,523; Referee: Mohammed Al-Hoaish

12 January 2018 17	Al-Ahli	5–0	Al-Batin	Jeddah
20:00	Assiri 2' (26), pen.' Al-Moasher 22', 42'; Fetfatzidis 82'	Report		Stadium: King Abdullah Sports City; Attendance: 23,898; Referee: Mark Clattenburg (England)

29 January 2018 19	Al-Batin	1–1	Al-Ettifaq	Hafar al-Batin
18:15	Jorge Silva 90+5'	Report	Al-Aboud 67'; Al Khairi (yellow card) 75'	Stadium: Al-Batin Club Stadium; Attendance: 1,734; Referee: Stefan Johannesson (Sweden)

4 February 2018 20	Al-Batin	1–5	Al-Hilal	Hafar al-Batin
18:20	Kanabah (yellow card) 21'; Jorge Silva 53'	Report	Al-Faraj 71' (pen.), 86'; Jahfali 73'; Cerutti 89'; Fallatah 90+1'	Stadium: Al-Batin Club Stadium; Attendance: 6,000; Referee: Carlos del Cerro Grande (Spain)

9 February 2018 21	Al-Raed	3–1	Al-Batin	Buraidah
15:50	Tarabai 25'; Bangoura 52', (yellow card) 88'; Atwa (yellow card) 58'; Shikabala 90', (yellow card) 90'	Report	Jhonnattann 43'; Khodari (yellow card) 60'; Eisa (yellow card) 90+1'; Ghunaiman (yellow card) 90+1'	Stadium: King Abdullah Sport City Stadium; Attendance: 3,942; Referee: Hamad Ali Yousef (United Arab Emirates)

15 February 2018 22	Al-Nassr	0–3	Al-Batin	Riyadh
20:30	Al-Obaid (yellow card) 4'	Report	Guilherme 9'; Jorge Silva 36', 90+2'; Nasser (yellow card) 51'	Stadium: Prince Faisal bin Fahd Stadium; Attendance: 3,626; Referee: Svein Oddvar Moen (Norway)

2 March 2018 23	Al-Batin	3–4	Al-Qadsiah	Hafar al-Batin
18:40	Jorge Silva (yellow card) 32', (goal) 70', 80'; Guilherme 90+2'	Report	Bismark 4', 17', 38', (yellow card) 29'; Masrahi (yellow card) 82'; Jorginho 90+4'	Stadium: Al-Batin Club Stadium; Attendance: 2,721; Referee: Sergey Ivanov (Russia)

6 March 2018 18	Al-Fateh	5–2	Al-Batin	Al-Hasa
18:25	Chenihi 20'; Oueslati 73', 83'; Al-Hassan 85'; Al-Zaqaan 90+1'	Report	Guilherme 2', 42'; Diabaté (yellow card) 90'	Stadium: Prince Abdullah bin Jalawi Stadium; Attendance: 2,171; Referee: Mark Clattenburg (England)

10 March 2018 24	Al-Taawoun	1–2	Al-Batin	Buraidah
18:50	Al-Ruwaili 20', (yellow card) 90+2'; Al-Mousa (yellow card) 88'	Report	Waqes (yellow card) 22'; Jhonnattann (yellow card) 29', (goal) 42'; Guilherme (yellow card) 32'; Kanabah (yellow card) 52'; Nasser (yellow card) 78'; Jorge Silva 82'; Tinga (yellow card) 90+6'	Stadium: King Abdullah Sport City Stadium; Attendance: 3,023; Referee: Sultan Al-Marzooqi (United Arab Emirates)

7 April 2018 25	Al-Batin	3–1	Al-Faisaly	Hafar al-Batin
20:40	Jhonnattann 33', 60'; Kanabah (yellow card) 45+1'; Guilherme 54'; Hawsawi (yellow card) 59'	Report	Al Mansor 30'; Malayekah (yellow card) 40'; Majrashi (yellow card) 44'; Al-Ghanam (yellow card) 45'; Patrício (yellow card) 83'	Stadium: Al-Batin Club Stadium; Attendance: 874; Referee: Turki Al-Khudair

12 April 2018 26	Al-Batin	1–1	Al-Fayha	Hafar al-Batin
19:00	Jhonnattann (yellow card) 31'; Jorge Silva (yellow card) 49', (goal) 62' (pen.); Al-Shammeri (yellow card) 60'	Report	Al-Johani 19'; Ruiz (yellow card) 24'; Al-Qarni (red card) 90+1'	Stadium: Al-Batin Club Stadium; Attendance: 832; Referee: Fahad Al-Mirdasi

=== Crown Prince Cup ===
All times are local, AST (UTC+3).

9 September 2017 Round of 16	Al-Shabab	1–0	Al-Batin	Riyadh
20:05	Al-Fahad (yellow card) 64'; Pizzelli 68'; Salem (yellow card) 81'		Jhonnattann (yellow card) 40'; Waqes (yellow card) 58'; Alhinho (yellow card) 72'; Jorge Silva (yellow card) 90'	Stadium: Prince Faisal bin Fahd Stadium; Attendance: 1,042; Referee: Abdulrahman Al-Shehri

=== King Cup ===
Al-Batin entered the King Cup in the Round of 32 alongside the other Pro League teams. In the first round, they defeated Al-Mujazzal and progressed to the Round of 16. In the Round of 16, Al-Batin defeated First Division side Damac with goals from new signings Guilherme and Jorge Silva. In the Quarter-finals, Al-Batin beat fellow Pro League side Al-Nassr and reached the Semi-finals for the first time in history. In the Semi-finals, Al-Batin lost to Al-Ittihad.

All times are local, AST (UTC+3).

5 January 2018 Round of 32	Al-Mujazzal	1–3	Al-Batin	Al Majma'ah
15:20	Al-Yousef 5'; Al-Bishi (yellow card) 53'; Sidevaldo (yellow card) 75'; Al-Muraished (yellow card) 76'	Report	Tarabai 13', (yellow card) 74'; Metlaq 40'; Jhonnattann (yellow card) 44', (goal) 90+2'; Paulo (yellow card) 65'; Waqes (yellow card) 87'	Stadium: King Salman Sport City Stadium; Referee: Sultan Al-Harbi

25 January 2018 Round of 16	Al-Batin	2–0	Damac	Hafar al-Batin
15:30	Guilherme 83'; Jorge Silva 84'	Report		Stadium: Al-Batin Club Stadium; Referee: Ivan Bebek (Croatia)

22 February 2018 Quarter-finals	Al-Nassr	0–1	Al-Batin	Riyadh
20:00	Madu (yellow card) 68'; Al-Fraidi (yellow card) 73'	Report	Nasser (yellow card) 15'; Jhonnattann 18'; Diabaté (yellow card) 21'; Al-Shammeri (yellow card) 51'; Guilherme (yellow card) 56'; Al-Jouei (yellow card) 58'; Khodari (yellow card) 66'; Mathlouthi (yellow card) 78'; Paulo (yellow card) 79'	Stadium: Prince Faisal bin Fahd Stadium; Referee: Simon Lee Evans (Wales)

1 April 2018 Semi-finals	Al-Batin	2–6	Al-Ittihad	Hafar al-Batin
20:35	Guilherme 2'; Tinga 62'; Waqes (yellow card) 87'; Ghunaiman (yellow card) 90' (yellow-red card) 90+4'	Report	Villanueva 5', 88' (pen.); Al-Ghamdi 68', 72'; Akaïchi 77', (yellow card) 78'; Al-Muziel (yellow card) 89'; Al-Aryani 90+2'	Stadium: Al-Batin Club Stadium; Referee: Shukri Al-Hanfoush

== Statistics ==
=== Squad statistics ===
As of 12 April 2018.

No.	Pos	Nat	Player	Total		Pro League		King Cup		Crown Prince Cup	
No.	Pos	Nat	Player	Apps	Goals	Apps	Goals	Apps	Goals	Apps	Goals
1	GK	(Saudi Arabia)	Nasser Al-Mehaini	5	0	2	0	2	0	1	0
3	DF	(Saudi Arabia)	Bander Nasser	28	0	25	0	2	0	1	0
4	MF	(Saudi Arabia)	Maan Khodari	14	0	10+3	0	0+1	0	0	0
5	MF	(Saudi Arabia)	Naif Eisa	15	0	3+12	0	0	0	0	0
6	DF	(Saudi Arabia)	Muteb Mansour	1	0	0	0	0+1	0	0	0
7	DF	(Saudi Arabia)	Mohanna Waqes	29	0	23+1	0	4	0	1	0
8	MF	(Saudi Arabia)	Mosaab Al-Otaibi	11	0	4+5	0	1	0	1	0
9	FW	(Brazil)	Guilherme Schettine	13	7	9+1	5	3	2	0	0
10	MF	(Saudi Arabia)	Jadaan Mohanna	2	0	1+1	0	0	0	0	0
12	MF	(Brazil)	Jhonnattann	30	11	24+1	9	4	2	1	0
14	MF	(Saudi Arabia)	Khaled Dakheel	5	0	1+4	0	0	0	0	0
15	MF	(Saudi Arabia)	Abdulmajeed Obaid	7	0	2+5	0	0	0	0	0
18	MF	(Saudi Arabia)	Abdulmalek Al-Shammeri	30	0	14+11	0	3+1	0	1	0
20	FW	(Saudi Arabia)	Sahow Metlaq	11	1	4+6	0	1	1	0	0
21	MF	(Saudi Arabia)	Majed Kanabah	24	0	20	0	2+1	0	1	0
23	MF	(Mali)	Ousmane Diabaté	11	0	7+1	0	3	0	0	0
24	MF	(Saudi Arabia)	Waleed Al-Enezi	3	0	0+2	0	0+1	0	0	0
25	DF	(Saudi Arabia)	Sultan Masrahi	23	1	19	1	3	0	1	0
26	GK	(Saudi Arabia)	Mazyad Freeh	18	0	17	0	1	0	0	0
27	MF	(Saudi Arabia)	Abdullah Al-Jouei	24	0	16+4	0	2+1	0	1	0
31	DF	(Saudi Arabia)	Sultan Ghunaiman	13	0	6+3	0	4	0	0	0
36	MF	(Saudi Arabia)	Hussein Halawani	1	0	0	0	1	0	0	0
42	GK	(Tunisia)	Aymen Mathlouthi	8	0	7	0	1	0	0	0
50	GK	(Saudi Arabia)	Khowailed Ayyadah	0	0	0	0	0	0	0	0
66	MF	(Saudi Arabia)	Khaled Al-Qattam	0	0	0	0	0	0	0	0
70	DF	(Nigeria)	Abdulshakour Hosawi	1	0	1	0	0	0	0	0
80	FW	(Saudi Arabia)	Yousef Al-Mozairib	4	1	0+3	1	0+1	0	0	0
87	DF	(Brazil)	Pitty	28	3	24	3	2+1	0	1	0
88	MF	(Saudi Arabia)	Yasser Al-Fahmi	1	0	0+1	0	0	0	0	0
90	DF	(Saudi Arabia)	Jamal Al-Dhefiri	6	0	3+3	0	0	0	0	0
92	MF	(Brazil)	Tinga	11	1	6+2	0	1+2	1	0	0
99	FW	(Brazil)	Jorge Silva	20	12	16	11	3	1	1	0
Players who left during the season
11	FW	(Brazil)	Tarabai	18	5	16	4	1	1	1	0
77	DF	(Iraq)	Alaa Mhawi	2	0	2	0	0	0	0	0
84	MF	(Angola)	Valdo Alhinho	13	0	4+7	0	0+1	0	1	0

=== Goalscorers ===
Rank	No.	Pos	Nat	Name	Pro League	King Cup	Crown Prince Cup	Total
1	99	FW	(Brazil)	Jorge Silva	11	1	0	12
2	12	MF	(Brazil)	Jhonnattann	9	2	0	11
3	9	FW	(Brazil)	Guilherme Schettine	5	1	0	6
4	11	FW	(Brazil)	Tarabai	4	1	0	5
5	87	DF	(Brazil)	Pitty	3	0	0	3
6	20	FW	(Saudi Arabia)	Sahow Metlaq	0	1	0	1
6	25	DF	(Saudi Arabia)	Sultan Masrahi	1	0	0	1
6	80	FW	(Saudi Arabia)	Yousef Al-Mozairib	1	0	0	1
6	92	MF	(Brazil)	Tinga	0	1	0	1
Own goal					1	0	0	1
Total					35	8	0	43

Last Updated: 12 April 2018

=== Clean sheets ===
Rank	No.	Pos	Nat	Name	Pro League	King Cup	Crown Prince Cup	Total
1	26	GK	(Saudi Arabia)	Mazyad Freeh	4	0	0	4
2	42	GK	(Tunisia)	Aymen Mathlouthi	1	1	0	2
3	1	GK	(Saudi Arabia)	Nasser Al-Mehaini	0	1	0	1
Total					5	2	0	7

Last Updated: 22 February 2018
