= 2017–18 Saudi Pro League =

Saudi Pro League
- Season: 2017–18
- Champions: Al-Hilal (15th title)
- AFC Champions League: Al-Hilal; Al-Ahli; Al-Nassr
- UAFA Club Championship: Al-Hilal; Al-Ahli; Al-Nassr; Al-Ittihad
- Matches: 182
- Goals: 542 (2.98 per match)
- Top goalscorer: Ronnie Fernández (13 goals)
- Biggest home win: Al-Ahli 5–0 Al-Batin (12 January 2018)
- Biggest away win: Al-Raed 0–5 Al-Nassr (17 November 2017); Al-Fateh 0–5 Al-Faisaly (25 November 2017)
- Highest scoring: Al-Ahli 5–3 Al-Raed (30 September 2017)
- Longest winning run: 5 matches Al-Ahli
- Longest unbeaten run: 11 matches Al-Hilal
- Longest winless run: 9 matches Al-Batin
- Longest losing run: 6 matches Ohod
- Highest attendance: 45,913; Al-Ittihad 0–0 Al-Ahli (4 February 2018)
- Lowest attendance: 275; Al-Faisaly 3–0 Al-Ettifaq (30 September 2017)
- Average attendance: 5,726
- All statistics correct as of 4 May 2018.

The 2018–19 Saudi Pro League. was the 43rd edition of the top-tier Saudi football league, established in 1974, and the 10th edition since it was rebranded as the Saudi Pro League in 2008, the season started on 10 August 2017 and concluded on 12 April 2018.

Al-Hilal were the defending champions after winning the Pro League last season for the 14th time. Al-Fayha and Ohod have entered as the promoted teams from the 2016–17 Saudi First Division. Al-Hilal were crowned as league winners for the second season in a row on the 12 April, after defeating Al-Fateh 4–1 on the final day of the season. No teams were relegated at the end of the season following the decision to increase the number of teams from 14 to 16. In its place, relegation play-offs were held between the bottom 2 teams of the Pro League and the 3rd and 4th placed teams of the MS League. Both Pro League teams, Al-Raed and Ohod, won their respective matches and secured their top-flight status.

Al-Fayha's Ronnie Fernández won the Golden Boot with 13 goals. Al-Ittihad's Carlos Villanueva and Al-Faisaly's Vuk Rašović were named as Player and Manager of the Season respectively.

== Teams ==
Locations of teams in the 2017–18 Saudi Professional League

Fourteen teams will compete in the league – the top eleven teams from the previous season, the playoff winner and two teams promoted from the First Division.

Teams who were promoted to the Pro League

The first club to be promoted was Al-Fayha, following their 2–1 win at home to Ohod on 29 April 2017. Al-Fayha will play in the top flight of Saudi football for the first time in their history. They were crowned champions on 5 May 2017 after drawing Wej 1–1 away from home, coupled with Al-Tai's 0–0 draw against fellow promoted club Ohod.

The second and final club to be promoted was Ohod, following their 0–0 draw at home to Al-Tai on 5 May 2017. Ohod will play in the top flight of Saudi football for the first time since 2005.

Teams who were relegated to the First Division

The first club to be relegated was Al-Wehda, ending their 2-year stay in the Pro League after a 2–1 home defeat to Al-Fateh on 20 April 2017.

The second and final club to be relegated was Al-Khaleej, ending their 3-year stay in the Pro League following a 2–2 draw to Al-Faisaly on 4 May 2017.

=== Stadiums ===
Note: Table lists in alphabetical order.

Team	Location	Stadium	Capacity
Al-Ahli	Jeddah	King Abdullah Sports City	62,000
Al-Batin	Hafar al-Batin	Al-Batin Club Stadium	6,000
Al-Ettifaq	Dammam	Prince Mohamed bin Fahd Stadium	21,701
Al-Faisaly	Harmah	King Salman Sport City Stadium	5,200
Al-Fateh	Al-Hasa	Prince Abdullah bin Jalawi Stadium	19,096
Al-Fayha	Al Majma'ah	King Salman Sport City Stadium	5,200
Al-Hilal	Riyadh	King Fahd International Stadium	62,685
Al-Ittihad	Jeddah	King Abdullah Sports City	62,000
Al-Nassr	Riyadh	King Fahd International Stadium	62,685
Al-Qadsiah	Khobar	Prince Saud bin Jalawi Stadium	11,000
Al-Raed	Buraidah	King Abdullah Sport City Stadium	23,600
Al-Shabab	Riyadh	King Fahd International Stadium	62,685
Al-Taawoun	Buraidah	King Abdullah Sport City Stadium	23,600
Ohod	Medina	Prince Mohammed bin Abdul Aziz Stadium	24,000

1: Al-Faisaly play their home games in Al-Majma'ah.
2: Al-Hilal, Al-Nassr and Al-Shabab also use Prince Faisal bin Fahd Stadium (22,500 seats) as a home stadium.

=== Personnel and kits ===
Team	Manager	Captain	Kit manufacturer	Shirt sponsor
Al-Ahli	(Ukraine) Serhiy Rebrov	(Saudi Arabia) Taisir Al-Jassim	Umbro	Saudia
Al-Batin	(Romania) Ciprian Panait	(Saudi Arabia) Naif Eisa	skillano	Al-Fowzan ProMan, Al Shallal Raya Hotel^{1}, Al Maali Hospital^{2}
Al-Ettifaq	(Saudi Arabia) Saad Al-Shehri	(Saudi Arabia) Ahmed Al-Kassar	Kappa	Al-Majdouie Hyundai, Kanaf, Sahara Net^{1}, Almana General Hospital^{1}, Innosoft^{2}, APSCO Mobil 1^{2}
Al-Faisaly	(Serbia) Vuk Rašović	(Saudi Arabia) Omar Abdulaziz	Joma	ALDREES, Al Riyadh Travel & Tourism, Roco, Shmagh Albassam^{1}, Hayat^{3}, PhysioTrio^{3}
Al-Fateh	(Tunisia) Fathi Al-Jabal	(Saudi Arabia) Mohammed Al-Fuhaid	Romai	Al Kifah^{1}, AlMoosa Hospital^{1}
Al-Fayha	(Argentina) Gustavo Costas	(Saudi Arabia) Sami Al-Khaibari	Macron	Herfy, The Fourth Triangle, Shmagh Al-Bassam^{1}, Kooz Karak^{1}, Ghaya^{2}, Enmaar^{2}, PhysioTrio^{3}
Al-Hilal	(Argentina) Juan Brown	(Saudi Arabia) Salman Al-Faraj	Nike	Volkswagen, Abdul Samad Al Qurashi^{1}, Sun & Sand Sports^{1}, Jawwy from STC^{2}, APSCO Mobil 1^{2}
Al-Ittihad	(Chile) José Luis Sierra	(Saudi Arabia) Adnan Fallatah	Joma	Bridgestone, Unionaire^{1}, APSCO Mobil 1^{2}
Al-Nassr	(Croatia) Krunoslav Jurčić	(Saudi Arabia) Ibrahim Ghaleb	New Balance	
Al-Qadsiah	(Saudi Arabia) Bandar Basreh	(Brazil) Élton Arábia	Offside	GREE, Almana General Hospital, Al Asasyah^{1}
Al-Raed	(Serbia) Aleksandar Ilić	(Saudi Arabia) Yahya Al-Musalem	Hattrick	Hana, AlMosa Group, Al-Qassim National Hospital^{1}
Al-Shabab	(Romania) Marius Șumudică	(Saudi Arabia) Nasser Al-Shamrani	Joma	
Al-Taawoun	(Portugal) José Manuel Gomes	(Egypt) Essam El-Hadary	skillano	Shmagh Al-Bassam^{1}
Ohod	(Senegal) Sadio Demba	(Saudi Arabia) Abdoh Besisi	ProIcon	Mozn, Al Safeer Thobe^{1}, FrawLaty^{3}

- ^{1} On the back of the strip.
- ^{2} On the right sleeve of the strip.
- ^{3} On the shorts.

=== Managerial changes ===
Team	Outgoing manager	Manner of departure	Date of vacancy	Position in table	Incoming manager	Date of appointment
Al-Ettifaq	(Netherlands) Eelco Schattorie	End of caretaker spell	5 May 2017	Pre-season	(Serbia) Miodrag Ješić	14 June 2017
Al-Faisaly	(Italy) Giovanni Solinas	End of contract	5 May 2017	Pre-season	(Serbia) Vuk Rašović	29 May 2017
Al-Nassr	(France) Patrice Carteron	Sacked	5 May 2017	Pre-season	(Brazil) Ricardo Gomes	14 June 2017
Al-Qadsiah	(Saudi Arabia) Bandar Basreh	End of caretaker spell	5 May 2017	Pre-season	(Tunisia) Nacif Beyaoui	16 June 2017
Al-Fayha	(Algeria) Al Habeeb Ramadan	End of contract	10 May 2017	Pre-season	(Romania) Constantin Gâlcă	20 May 2017
Al-Raed	(Tunisia) Nacif Beyaoui	Resigned	14 May 2017	Pre-season	(Algeria) Taoufik Rouabah	4 June 2017
Al-Batin	(Saudi Arabia) Khalid Al-Koroni	End of contract	17 May 2017	Pre-season	(Portugal) Quim Machado	24 May 2017
Al-Ahli	(Switzerland) Christian Gross	Mutual consent	31 May 2017	Pre-season	(Ukraine) Serhiy Rebrov	21 June 2017
Al-Shabab	(Saudi Arabia) Sami Al-Jaber	Sacked	16 September 2017	9th	(England) Mike Newell (interim)	16 September 2017
Al-Nassr	(Brazil) Ricardo Gomes	Sacked	22 September 2017	4th	(Brazil) Rogério Lourenço (interim)	22 September 2017
Al-Shabab	(England) Mike Newell	Interim period ended	23 September 2017	6th	(Uruguay) José Daniel Carreño	23 September 2017
Al-Raed	(Algeria) Taoufik Rouabah	Sacked	1 October 2017	14th	(Romania) Ciprian Panait	4 October 2017
Al-Nassr	(Brazil) Rogério Lourenço	Interim period ended	3 October 2017	5th	(Bolivia) Gustavo Quinteros	3 October 2017
Al-Fayha	(Romania) Constantin Gâlcă	Sacked	1 November 2017	12th	(Argentina) Gustavo Costas	1 November 2017
Al-Qadisiyah	(Tunisia) Nacif Beyaoui	Mutual consent	2 November 2017	7th	(Brazil) Paulo Bonamigo	2 November 2017
Ohod	(Saudi Arabia) Abdulwahab Al-Harbi	Resigned	5 November 2017	14th	(Algeria) Nabil Neghiz	10 November 2017
Al-Ettifaq	(Serbia) Miodrag Ješić	Sacked	10 December 2017	13th	(Saudi Arabia) Saad Al-Shehri	10 December 2017
Al-Nassr	(Bolivia) Gustavo Quinteros	Sacked	31 January 2018	4th	(Croatia) Krunoslav Jurčić	31 January 2018
Al-Batin	(Portugal) Quim Machado	Sacked	4 February 2018	10th	(Romania) Ciprian Panait	6 February 2018
Al-Qadisiyah	(Brazil) Paulo Bonamigo	Sacked	5 February 2018	12th	(Saudi Arabia) Bandar Basreh (interim)	5 February 2018
Al-Raed	(Romania) Ciprian Panait	Sacked	5 February 2018	14th	(Serbia) Aleksandar Ilić	5 February 2018
Ohod	(Algeria) Nabil Neghiz	Sacked	18 February 2018	13th	(Tunisia) Maher Kanzari	23 February 2018
Al-Hilal	(Argentina) Ramón Díaz	Sacked	20 February 2018	1st	(Argentina) Juan Brown (interim)	20 February 2018
Al-Shabab	(Uruguay) José Daniel Carreño	Mutual consent	8 March 2018	10th	(Saudi Arabia) Khalid Al-Koroni	8 March 2018
Ohod	(Tunisia) Maher Kanzari	Sacked	12 April 2018	14th	(Senegal) Sadio Demba	12 April 2018
Al-Ahli	(Ukraine) Serhiy Rebrov	Sacked	19 April 2018	2nd	(Tunisia) Fathi Al-Jabal (caretaker)	19 April 2018

=== Foreign players ===
The number of foreign players was increased from 4 players to 6 players, and for the first time in the history of the Pro League foreign goalkeepers are allowed. On January 11, 2018, SAFF increased the number of foreign players from 6 players to 7 players.

Players name in bold indicates the player is registered during the mid-season transfer window.

Club	Player 1	Player 2	Player 3	Player 4	Player 5	Player 6	Player 7	Former players
Al-Ahli	(Australia) **Mark Milligan**	(Brazil) Claudemir	(Brazil) Leonardo	(Egypt) **Moamen Zakaria**	(Greece) Giannis Fetfatzidis	(Ba'athist Syria) Omar Al Somah	(Tunisia) **Mohamed Amine Ben Amor**	(Egypt) Mohamed Abdel Shafy (Nigeria) Godfrey Oboabona
Al-Batin	(Brazil) **Guilherme Schettine**	(Brazil) Jhonnattann	(Brazil) Jou Silva	(Brazil) Pitty	(Brazil) **Tinga**	(Niger) **Ousmane Diabaté**	(Tunisia) **Aymen Mathlouthi**	(Angola) Valdo Alhinho (Brazil) Tarabai (Iraq) Alaa Mhawi
Al-Ettifaq	(Algeria) **Raïs M'Bolhi**	(Egypt) **Ahmed El Sheikh**	(Egypt) **Hussein El Sayed**	(Iraq) Ahmed Ibrahim Khalaf	(Slovakia) Filip Kiss	(Somalia) **Liban Abdi**	(Tunisia) **Fakhreddine Ben Youssef**	(Argentina) Rodrigo Salinas (Kuwait) Fahad Al Hajeri (Spain) Juanmi Callejón
Al-Faisaly	(Brazil) **Evson**	(Brazil) Igor Rossi	(Brazil) Luisinho	(Brazil) Rogerinho	(Brazil) **Zé Eduardo**	(Egypt) **Saleh Gomaa**	(Trinidad and Tobago) Khaleem Hyland	(Romania) Mircea Axente (Zimbabwe) Tendai Ndoro
Al-Fateh	(Algeria) **Ibrahim Chenihi**	(Brazil) João Pedro	(Brazil) Sandro Manoel	(Egypt) **Mohamed Abdel Shafy**	(Tunisia) Abdelkader Oueslati	(Zambia) Saith Sakala		(Tunisia) Mohamed Ali Yacoubi
Al-Fayha	(Argentina) **Jonathan Gómez**	(Cape Verde) Gegé	(Chile) Ronnie Fernández	(Colombia) Danilo Asprilla	(Costa Rica) John Jairo Ruiz	(Greece) Alexandros Tziolis	(Honduras) Emilio Izaguirre	
Al-Hilal	(Argentina) **Ezequiel Cerutti**	(Brazil) Carlos Eduardo	(Morocco) **Achraf Bencharki**	(Oman) Ali Al-Habsi	(Ba'athist Syria) Omar Khribin	(Uruguay) Nicolás Milesi	(Venezuela) Gelmin Rivas	(Uruguay) Matías Britos
Al-Ittihad	(Chile) Carlos Villanueva	(Egypt) Mahmoud Kahraba	(Kuwait) Fahad Al Ansari	(Tunisia) Ahmed Akaïchi				
Al-Nassr	(Algeria) **Abdelmoumene Djabou**	(Brazil) Bruno Uvini	(Brazil) Leonardo	(Democratic Republic of the Congo) **Junior Kabananga**	(Morocco) Mohamed Fouzair	(Oman) **Saad Al-Mukhaini**	(Tunisia) **Ferjani Sassi**	(Egypt) Hossam Ghaly (Liberia) William Jebor (Morocco) Saad Lagrou
Al-Qadsiah	(Brazil) Bismark	(Brazil) Élton Arábia	(Brazil) **Jorginho**	(Brazil) **Paulo Sérgio**	(Ghana) Mohammed Fatau	(Ivory Coast) Hervé Guy	(Nigeria) Stanley Ohawuchi	(Tunisia) Mohammad Mothnani
Al-Raed	(Brazil) Daniel Amora	(Brazil) Eli Sabiá	(Brazil) **Tarabai**	(Egypt) **Mohamed Atwa**	(Egypt) Shikabala	(Guinea) Ismaël Bangoura	(Morocco) **Issam Erraki**	(Brazil) Wander Luiz (Comoros) Kassim Abdallah
Al-Shabab	(Algeria) Djamel Benlamri	(Algeria) Mohamed Benyettou	(Chile) **Sebastián Ubilla**	(Egypt) **Amr Barakat**	(Iraq) Saad Abdul-Amir	(Libya) **Muaid Ellafi**	(Tunisia) Farouk Ben Mustapha	(Armenia) Marcos Pizzelli (Brazil) Jonatas Belusso
Al-Taawoun	(Burundi) Cédric Amissi	(Egypt) **Emad Moteab**	(Egypt) Essam El Hadary	(Egypt) Mostafa Fathi	(Portugal) Ricardo Machado	(Romania) **Adrian Popa**	(Ba'athist Syria) Jehad Al-Hussain	(Sierra Leone) Alhaji Kamara
Ohod	(Algeria) Azzedine Doukha	(Algeria) **Mohamed Boulaouidet**	(Algeria) **Nacereddine Khoualed**	(Ghana) Isaac Vorsah	(Mali) **Mamoutou N'Diaye**	(Oman) **Mohsin Al-Khaldi**	(Tunisia) **Hichem Essifi**	(Brazil) Dudu (Brazil) Ronaldo (Madagascar) Carolus Andriamatsinoro

== League table ==
Pos	Team	Pld	W	D	L	GF	GA	GD	Pts	Qualification or relegation
1	Al-Hilal (C)	26	16	8	2	47	23	+24	56	Qualification to AFC Champions League group stage
2	Al-Ahli	26	16	7	3	59	26	+33	55	Qualification to AFC Champions League group stage
3	Al-Nassr	26	12	8	6	47	34	+13	44	Qualification to AFC Champions League play-off round
4	Al-Ettifaq	26	10	6	10	37	46	−9	36 (Note: Al-Ettifaq finished ahead of Al-Fateh on head-to-head points: Al-Ettifaq 2–1 Al-Fateh, Al-Fateh 1–1 Al-Ettifaq)	
5	Al-Fateh	26	9	9	8	34	39	−5	36	
6	Al-Faisaly	26	9	8	9	39	33	+6	35	
7	Al-Taawoun	26	9	7	10	43	36	+7	34 (Note: Al-Taawoun finished ahead of Al-Fayha on head-to-head points: Al-Fayha 1–1 Al-Taawoun, Al-Taawoun 4–0 Al-Fayha)	
8	Al-Fayha	26	8	10	8	36	40	−4	34	
9	Al-Ittihad	26	8	9	9	34	41	−7	33	Qualification to AFC Champions League group stage (Note: Al-Ittihad qualified for the AFC Champions League group stage as 2018 King Cup winners.)
10	Al-Shabab	26	8	7	11	36	36	0	31 (Note: Al-Shabab finished ahead of Al-Batin on overall goal difference: Al-Shabab 0, Al-Batin –11 (Al-Shabab 1–2 Al-Batin, Al-Batin 0–1 Al-Shabab).)	
11	Al-Batin	26	8	7	11	35	46	−11	31	
12	Al-Qadsiah	26	6	7	13	28	41	−13	25	
13	Al-Raed (O)	26	5	9	12	43	53	−10	24	Qualification to relegation play-offs
14	Ohod (O)	26	4	6	16	24	48	−24	18	Qualification to relegation play-offs

Updated to match(es) played on 12 April 2018. Source: slstat.com
Rules for classification: 1) Points; 2) Head-to-head points; 3) Head-to-head goal difference; 4) Total goal difference; 5) Total goals scored; 6) Play-off (only for deciding champion, relegation and AFC competitions participation).
(C) Champions; (O) Play-off winners

=== Positions by round ===
The following table lists the positions of teams after each week of matches. In order to preserve the chronological evolution, any postponed matches are not included to the round at which they were originally scheduled, but added to the full round they were played immediately afterwards. If a club from the Saudi Professional League wins the King Cup, they will qualify for the AFC Champions League, unless they have already qualified for it through their league position. In this case, an additional AFC Champions League group stage berth will be given to the 3rd placed team, and the AFC Champions League play-off round spot will be given to 4th.

Team ╲ Round	1	2	3	4	5	6	7	8	9	10	11	12	13	14	15	16	17	18	19	20	21	22	23	24	25	26
Al-Hilal	4	2	2	1	1	4	2	2	2	2	2	2	1	2	2	1	1	1	1	1	1	1	1	1	1	1
Al-Ahli	8	5	6	3	2	1	1	1	1	1	1	1	2	1	1	2	2	2	2	2	2	2	2	2	2	2
Al-Nassr	2	3	5	7	5	5	4	3	4	3	4	3	3	3	3	3	4	4	4	3	3	4	3	3	3	3
Al-Ettifaq	6	4	8	11	12	13	13	11	10	10	10	12	13	13	13	12	13	13	12	11	11	11	8	6	9	4
Al-Fateh	14	14	12	8	8	6	6	6	8	5	6	7	9	9	11	10	10	10	9	9	9	9	7	4	4	5
Al-Faisaly	13	9	3	4	4	3	5	4	3	4	3	4	4	4	4	4	3	3	3	4	4	3	4	5	6	6
Al-Taawoun	1	6	7	9	10	10	7	7	9	9	7	8	7	7	9	7	8	8	7	6	6	6	9	8	5	7
Al-Fayha FC	11	13	13	13	11	11	11	12	12	13	12	13	11	11	8	9	7	7	8	8	7	7	10	7	7	8
Al-Ittihad	12	8	10	10	6	7	8	8	6	7	8	6	5	5	5	5	6	6	5	5	5	5	5	10	8	9
Al-Shabab	10	7	9	6	9	9	10	10	11	11	11	9	10	10	7	6	5	5	6	7	8	8	11	9	10	10
Al-Batin	3	1	1	2	3	2	3	5	5	6	5	5	6	6	6	8	9	9	10	10	10	10	11	11	11	11
Al-Qadsiah	5	11	4	5	7	8	9	9	7	8	9	10	8	8	10	11	11	11	11	12	12	12	12	12	12	12
Al-Raed	9	12	14	14	14	14	14	13	13	14	14	14	14	14	14	14	14	14	14	14	14	14	14	13	13	13
Ohod	7	10	11	12	13	12	12	14	14	12	13	11	12	12	12	13	12	12	13	13	13	13	13	14	14	14

Leader
2018 AFC Champions League group stage
2018 AFC Champions League play-off round
Qualification to relegation play-off
Relegation to 2017–18 First Division

Source: slstat.com

== Results ==
Home \ Away	AHL	BAT	ETT	FSY	FAT	FAY	HIL	ITT	NSR	QAD	RAE	SHB	TWN	OHD
Al-Ahli		5–0	4–1	2–1	4–0	1–1	0–0	3–0	1–1	3–0	5–3	3–2	5–1	1–0
Al-Batin	1–2		1–1	3–1	0–0	1–1	1–5	1–2	1–1	3–4	1–5	0–1	1–1	2–0
Al-Ettifaq	2–1	1–3		0–0	2–1	1–1	2–1	1–2	3–2	1–2	2–0	2–3	3–2	3–2
Al-Faisaly	1–2	0–1	3–0		0–2	2–1	1–1	2–1	1–3	2–0	2–2	2–2	0–1	2–0
Al-Fateh	1–3	5–2	1–1	0–5		3–2	0–0	1–2	1–1	2–1	1–0	1–0	1–4	0–0
Al-Fayha	1–1	2–0	1–2	2–2	1–3		2–1	2–5	1–0	2–0	3–3	3–1	1–1	1–0
Al-Hilal	2–0	2–1	1–1	1–0	4–1	2–1		1–1	2–2	2–1	2–1	1–1	1–0	1–0
Al-Ittihad	0–0	1–3	4–2	3–3	0–0	0–1	1–1		1–3	0–0	2–1	1–1	2–5	2–2
Al-Nassr	3–1	0–3	2–2	1–1	3–1	2–2	1–2	1–0		2–1	4–3	1–0	2–1	2–0
Al Qadsiah	0–1	0–0	1–2	1–1	1–4	1–1	0–1	0–0	3–2		2–1	1–2	1–0	4–1
Al-Raed	0–3	3–1	0–1	2–3	2–2	2–0	0–3	3–1	0–5	1–1		2–2	2–2	2–2
Al-Shabab	2–5	1–2	3–1	0–1	1–1	0–0	1–2	3–0	0–1	4–1	0–0		2–1	1–2
Al-Taawoun	1–1	1–2	4–0	1–0	0–0	4–0	3–4	1–2	1–0	1–1	2–2	2–1		3–1
Ohod	2–2	1–1	1–0	1–3	0–2	2–3	1–4	0–1	2–2	2–1	1–3	0–2	1–0	

Updated to match(es) played on 12 April 2018. Source: slstat.com
Legend: Blue = home team win; Yellow = draw; Red = away team win.

=== Season progress ===
Team ╲ Round	1	2	3	4	5	6	7	8	9	10	11	12	13	14	15	16	17	18	19	20	21	22	23	24	25	26
Al-Ahli	L	W	D	W	W	W	W	W	D	D	W	L	D	W	W	L	W	W	W	D	W	D	W	W	D	W
Al-Batin	W	W	W	L	D	W	L	L	D	D	D	W	L	L	D	L	L	L	D	L	L	W	L	W	W	D
Al-Ettifaq	W	D	L	L	L	L	D	W	W	L	D	L	L	L	W	W	L	D	D	W	D	W	W	W	L	W
Al-Faisaly	L	W	W	D	W	W	L	L	W	D	W	L	W	D	D	D	W	D	D	L	L	W	L	L	L	D
Al-Fateh	L	L	W	W	D	W	D	D	L	W	L	L	D	D	L	D	D	W	W	L	W	D	W	W	D	L
Al-Fayha	L	L	D	D	W	L	D	L	D	L	W	L	W	W	W	L	W	W	D	W	D	D	L	D	D	D
Al-Hilal	W	W	W	D	W	W	W	W	D	D	D	W	D	L	W	W	D	W	W	W	D	W	W	L	D	W
Al-Ittihad	L	W	L	D	W	D	L	D	W	D	L	W	W	W	L	D	D	L	W	D	D	D	L	L	W	L
Al-Nassr	W	D	D	D	W	W	D	L	D	W	W	W	L	D	L	W	L	W	L	W	D	L	W	W	D	W
Al Qadsiah	W	L	W	D	L	L	D	D	W	D	L	L	W	D	L	L	L	L	L	L	D	D	W	L	W	L
Al-Raed	L	L	L	D	L	L	D	W	L	L	D	W	L	D	D	D	D	L	L	D	W	L	L	W	D	W
Al-Shabab	L	W	L	W	L	L	D	D	D	D	L	W	L	W	W	W	W	L	L	D	L	L	W	D	L	D
Al-Taawoun	W	L	D	D	L	L	W	W	L	D	D	L	W	D	L	W	D	W	W	W	L	D	L	L	W	L
Ohod	W	L	L	L	L	D	D	L	L	W	D	W	D	L	D	L	D	L	L	L	W	L	L	L	L	L

Source: slstat.com
W = Win; D = Draw; L = Lose

== Relegation play-offs ==
On March 7, 2018, the Saudi Football Federation announced that the number of teams in the Saudi Professional League will be increased from 14 teams to 16 teams. The relegation was removed and in its place, they announced a relegation play-off. The bottom 2 teams will face the 3rd and 4th place team in the Prince Mohammad bin Salman League.

Team 1	Agg.	Team 2	1st leg	2nd leg
Al-Raed	5–1	Al-Kawkab	4–1	1–0
Ohod	7–1	Al-Tai	5–0	2–1

27 April 2018
19:10 UTC+3

Al-Raed	4–1	Al-Kawkab
Bangoura 11' (pen.); Al-Shehri 47'; Tarabai 73'; Erraki 88' (pen.)	Report	Diouf 64'

King Abdullah Sport City Stadium, Buraidah
Referee: Svein Oddvar Moen (Norway)
4 May 2018
19:00 UTC+3

Al-Kawkab	0–1	Al-Raed
	Report	Tarabai 68'

Al-Shoulla Club Stadium, Al-Kharj
Referee: Pawel Raczkowski (Poland)

Al-Raed won 5–1 on aggregate.

26 April 2018
19:25 UTC+3

Ohod	5–0	Al-Tai
Khoualed 2'; Essifi 19', 46', 86'; Al-Khaldi 61'	Report

Prince Mohammed bin Abdul Aziz Stadium, Medina
Referee: Simon Lee Evans (Wales)
3 May 2018
19:25 UTC+3

Al-Tai	1–2	Ohod
Abdoh Jaber 89'	Report	Attiyah 59'; Al-Khaldi 66'

Prince Abdul Aziz bin Musa'ed Stadium, Ha'il
Referee: Pavel Královec (Czech Republic)

Ohod won 7–1 on aggregate.

== Statistics ==
=== Top scorers ===
As of 12 April 2018

Rank	Player	Club	Goals
1	(Chile) Ronnie Fernández	Al-Fayha	13
2	(Brazil) Jou Silva	Al-Batin	11
2	(Ba'athist Syria) Omar Al Somah	Al-Ahli	11
4	(Brazil) Bismark	Al-Qadsiah	10
4	(Brazil) Leonardo Pereira	Al-Nassr	10
4	(Brazil) Leonardo Silva	Al-Ahli	10
4	(Guinea) Ismaël Bangoura	Al-Raed	10
4	(Saudi Arabia) Mohammad Al-Sahlawi	Al-Nassr	10
4	(Tunisia) Ahmed Akaïchi	Al-Ittihad	10
10	(Brazil) Jhonnattann	Al-Batin	9
10	(Brazil) João Pedro	Al-Fateh	9
10	(Brazil) Luisinho	Al-Faisaly	9
10	(Egypt) Mahmoud Kahraba	Al-Ittihad	9
10	(Greece) Giannis Fetfatzidis	Al-Ahli	9

=== Top assists ===
As of 12 April 2018

Rank	Player	Club	Assists
1	(Ba'athist Syria) Jehad Al-Hussain	Al-Taawoun	9
2	(Brazil) Luisinho	Al-Faisaly	8
3	(Chile) Carlos Villanueva	Al-Ittihad	7
4	(Brazil) Leonardo	Al-Ahli	6
4	(Saudi Arabia) Abdulfattah Asiri	Al-Ahli	6
4	(Saudi Arabia) Sultan Al-Sawadi	Al-Raed	6
4	(Saudi Arabia) Yahya Al-Shehri	Al-Nassr	6
8	(Brazil) Jhonnattann	Al-Batin	5
8	(Egypt) Mahmoud Kahraba	Al-Ittihad	5
8	(Saudi Arabia) Mansoor Al-Harbi	Al-Ahli	5
8	(Saudi Arabia) Nasser Al-Shamrani	Al-Shabab	5
8	(Syria) Omar Khribin	Al-Hilal	5

=== Hat-tricks ===
Player	For	Against	Result	Date	Ref.
(Egypt) Mostafa Fathi	Al-Taawoun	Al-Fayha	4–0	29 December 2017	

=== Clean sheets ===
As of 12 April 2018

Rank	Player	Club	Clean sheets
1	(Saudi Arabia) Ali Al-Mazyadei	Al-Fateh	8
2	(Saudi Arabia) Mohammed Al-Owais	Al-Ahli	7
3	(Egypt) Essam El-Hadary	Al-Taawoun	6
3	(Saudi Arabia) Mustafa Malayekah	Al-Faisaly	6
5	(Saudi Arabia) Abdulrahman Dagriri	Al-Fayha	5
5	(Saudi Arabia) Waleed Abdullah	Al-Nassr	5
5	(Tunisia) Farouk Ben Mustapha	Al-Shabab	5
8	(Oman) Ali Al-Habsi	Al-Hilal	4
8	(Saudi Arabia) Abdullah Al-Mayouf	Al-Hilal	4
8	(Saudi Arabia) Faisel Masrahi	Al-Qadsiah	4
8	(Saudi Arabia) Mazyad Freeh	Al-Batin	4

=== Discipline ===
==== Player ====
- Most yellow cards: 11
  - (Saudi Arabia) Majed Kanabah (Al-Batin)
  - (Saudi Arabia) Sami Al-Khaibari (Al-Fayha)
- Most red cards: 1
  - 17 players

==== Club ====
- Most yellow cards: 60
  - Al-Ettifaq
- Most red cards: 3
  - Al-Fateh

== Attendances ==
=== By round ===
2017–18 Professional League Attendance
Round	Total	GP.	Avg. Per Game
Round 1	34,900	7	4,986
Round 2	36,791	7	5,256
Round 3	19,341	7	2,763
Round 4	66,932	7	9,562
Round 5	21,239	7	3,034
Round 6	25,431	7	3,633
Round 7	56,556	7	8,079
Round 8	28,010	7	4,001
Round 9	31,203	7	4,458
Round 10	37,546	7	5,364
Round 11	33,441	7	4,777
Round 12	25,655	7	3,665
Round 13	27,335	7	3,905
Round 14	21,611	7	3,087
Round 15	23,898	7	3,414
Round 16	34,767	7	4,967
Round 17	61,441	7	8,777
Round 18	39,973	7	5,710
Round 19	58,770	7	8,396
Round 20	59,291	7	8,470
Round 21	51,047	7	7,292
Round 22	34,328	7	4,904
Round 23	66,973	7	9,568
Round 24	42,595	7	6,085
Round 25	65,232	7	9,319
Round 26	37,765	7	5,395
Total	1,042,071	182	5,726

=== By team ===
Pos	Team	Total	High	Low	Average	Change
1	Al-Ahli	216,456	43,794	4,831	16,650	−19.5%
2	Al-Ittihad	210,757	45,913	3,470	16,212	−36.2%
3	Al-Hilal	158,523	26,602	3,319	12,194	−20.8%
4	Ohod	79,325	16,529	991	6,102	n/a †
5	Al-Nassr	71,246	17,879	1,166	5,480	−28.2%
6	Al-Raed	62,000	17,003	1,864	4,769	−18.4%
7	Al-Taawoun	50,385	8,084	1,238	3,876	−22.9%
8	Al-Ettifaq	40,175	14,618	503	3,090	−18.0%
9	Al-Fateh	38,709	7,924	871	2,978	−12.0%
10	Al-Batin	34,952	6,500	832	2,689	+3.1%
11	Al-Shabab	27,764	9,511	553	2,136	−23.7%
12	Al-Qadsiah	26,948	8,443	498	2,073	+20.6%
13	Al-Faisaly	12,632	2,316	275	972	+27.9%
14	Al-Fayha	12,199	1,781	279	938	n/a †
	League total	1,042,071	45,913	275	5,726	−18.0%

Updated to games played on 12 April 2018
Notes:
^{†} Teams played previous season in First Division.

== Awards ==
For the first time in the history of the competition, the Saudi Arabian Football Federation announced annual awards for the best player in each position, the best young player and the perfect team.

Award	Winner	Club
Manager of the Year	(Serbia) Vuk Rašović	Al-Faisaly
Best Goalkeeper	(Saudi Arabia) Mohammed Al-Owais	Al-Ahli
Best Defender	(Saudi Arabia) Motaz Hawsawi	Al-Ahli
Best Full-back	(Saudi Arabia) Yasser Al-Shahrani	Al-Hilal
Best Midfielder	(Chile) Carlos Villanueva	Al-Ittihad
Best Attacker	(Chile) Ronnie Fernández	Al-Fayha
Player of the Year	(Chile) Carlos Villanueva	Al-Ittihad
Young Player of the Year	(Saudi Arabia) Turki Al-Ammar	Al-Shabab
Top Scorer	(Chile) Ronnie Fernández	Al-Fayha
Perfect Team	Al-Hilal	—

=== Team of the Season ===
Team of the Season
Goalkeeper	(Tunisia) Farouk Ben Mustapha (Al-Shabab)			
Defenders	(Saudi Arabia) Mohammed Al-Breik (Al-Hilal)	(Saudi Arabia) Mohammed Jahfali (Al-Hilal)	(Saudi Arabia) Motaz Hawsawi (Al-Ahli)	(Saudi Arabia) Mansour Al-Harbi (Al-Ahli)
Midfielders	(Saudi Arabia) Abdullah Otayf (Al-Hilal)	(Saudi Arabia) Salman Al-Faraj (Al-Hilal)	(Brazil) Leonardo (Al-Nassr)	(Colombia) Danilo Asprilla (Al-Fayha)
Forwards	(Syria) Omar Al-Somah (Al-Ahli)	(Tunisia) Ahmed Akaïchi (Al-Ittihad)		

== See also ==
- 2017–18 Prince Faisal bin Fahd League
- 2017–18 Second Division
- 2018 King Cup
- 2017–18 Crown Prince Cup
