= 2018 King's Cup (Saudi Arabia) =

2018 King Cup
Tournament details
- Country: Saudi Arabia
- Dates: 3 January – 12 May 2018
- Teams: 32

Final positions
- Champions: Al-Ittihad
- Runners-up: Al-Faisaly

Tournament statistics
- Matches played: 31
- Goals scored: 96 (3.1 per match)
- Top goal scorer(s): Carlos Villanueva (4 goals)
- All statistics correct as of 12 May 2018.

The 2018 King Cup, or The Custodian of the Two Holy Mosques Cup, was the 43rd edition of the King Cup since its establishment in 1957, and the 11th under the current format. It started on 3 January and concluded with the final on 12 May 2018. The winner qualified for the 2019 AFC Champions League group stage.

Al-Ittihad won their eighth title after a 3–1 win over Al-Faisaly in the final on 12 May 2018.

Pro League side Al-Hilal were the defending champions, but they were eliminated by Al-Qadsiah in the Round of 16. It was the earliest exit by the title holders since the introduction of the new format.

== Participating teams ==
A total of 32 teams participated in this season. 14 teams from the Professional league, 16 teams from the First Division, and 2 teams qualifying from the preliminary stage.

League	Teams
Pro League	Al-Ahli; Al-Batin; Al-Ettifaq; Al-Faisaly; Al-Fateh; Al-Fayha; Al-Hilal ^{TH}; Al-Ittihad; Al-Nassr; Al-Qadsiah; Al-Raed; Al-Shabab; Al-Taawoun; Ohod
Prince Mohammad bin Salman League	Al-Hazem; Al-Kawkab; Al-Khaleej; Al-Mujazzal; Al-Nahda; Al-Nojoom; Al-Orobah; Al-Qaisumah; Al-Shoulla; Al-Tai; Al-Watani; Al-Wehda; Damac; Hajer; Jeddah; Najran
Third Division	Al-Bahah; Al-Zulfi

== Bracket ==
Round of 32
H	Al-Hilal	2
A	Hajer	1
H	Al-Qadsiah	3
A	Jeddah	2
H	Al-Wehda	0
A	Al-Nojoom (a.e.t.)	2
A	Al-Faisaly (a.e.t.)	3
H	Al-Watani	2
A	Al-Fayha (a.e.t.)	3
H	Al-Qaisumah	2
H	Al-Fateh	1
A	Al-Hazem	0
H	Ohod	0
A	Al-Orobah	1
A	Al-Ahli	2
H	Al-Shoulla	0
A	Al-Ittihad	3
H	Al-Kawkab	1
H	Al-Ettifaq	6
A	Al-Tai	0
H	Al-Shabab	2
A	Najran	0
A	Al-Khaleej	1
H	Al-Bahah	0
A	Al-Batin	3
H	Al-Mujazzal	1
H	Al-Taawoun	1
A	Damac	2
H	Al-Raed	0
A	Al-Nahda	1
H	Al-Nassr	2
A	Al-Zulfi	0

Round of 16
A	Al-Hilal	0
H	Al-Qadsiah	1
A	Al-Nojoom	0
H	Al-Faisaly	2
H	Al-Fayha (a.e.t.)	2
A	Al-Fateh	1
A	Al-Orobah	0
H	Al-Ahli	6
H	Al-Ittihad	2
A	Al-Ettifaq	1
H	Al-Shabab	3
A	Al-Khaleej	1
H	Al-Batin	2
A	Damac	0
A	Al-Nahda	0
H	Al-Nassr	1

Quarter-finals
H	Al-Qadsiah	2
A	Al-Faisaly	3
H	Al-Fayha	2 (3)
A	Al-Ahli (pen.)	2 (4)
H	Al-Ittihad	3
A	Al-Shabab	1
A	Al-Batin	1
H	Al-Nassr	0

Semi-finals
H	Al-Faisaly	1
A	Al-Ahli	0
A	Al-Ittihad	6
H	Al-Batin	2

Final
–	Al-Faisaly	1
–	Al-Ittihad	3

Note: H: Home team, A: Away team

Source: SAFF

== Round of 32 ==
The Round of 32 matches were played between 3 and 7 January 2018. All times are local, AST (UTC+3).

3 January 2018 12	Al-Bahah (4)	0–1	Al-Khaleej (2)	Al Bahah
15:45	Al-Zahrani (yellow card) 13'; Zayed (yellow card) 45+1'; Al-Haly (yellow card) 84'	Report	Al-Enezi 53'; Sami (yellow card) 78'; Meshqi (yellow card) 89'	Stadium: King Saud Sport City Stadium; Referee: Mohammed Al-Qarni

3 January 2018 10	Al-Ettifaq (1)	6–0	Al-Tai (2)	Dammam
17:40	Al-Selouli 28', 45'; Al-Saiari 33', 48', 49'; Al-Zubaidi (yellow card) 54'; Al-Sonain 59'	Report	Al-Amri (yellow card) 1'; Al-Jarrad (yellow card) 90+1'	Stadium: Prince Mohamed bin Fahd Stadium; Referee: Sami Al-Jires

3 January 2018 3	Al-Wehda (2)	0–2 (a.e.t.)	Al-Nojoom (2)	Makkah
19:45	Al-Sulami (yellow card) 115'	Report	Awadh (yellow card) 62'; Al-Harbi 96' (pen.); Sharoumah (yellow card) 111'; Al-Majhad 113'	Stadium: King Abdul Aziz Stadium; Referee: Abdullah Al-Awidan

4 January 2018 7	Ohod (1)	0–1	Al-Orobah (2)	Medina
15:45	Assiri (yellow card) 72'; Al-Nabit (yellow card) 83'	Report	Bander 4', (yellow card) 35'; Al-Munaif (yellow card) 22'; Rawaf (yellow card) 24'	Stadium: Prince Mohammed bin Abdul Aziz Stadium; Referee: Majid Al-Shamrani

4 January 2018 2	Al-Qadsiah (1)	3–2	Jeddah (2)	Khobar
17:40	Fallatah (yellow card) 18', (goal) 35'; Élton 39', 81'; Bismark (yellow card) 53'	Report	Al-Johani 10'; Al-Qarni 83'	Stadium: Prince Saud bin Jalawi Stadium; Referee: Khaled Salwi

4 January 2018 1	Al-Hilal (1)	2–1	Hajer (2)	Riyadh
19:20	Rivas 11'; Al Bulaihi (yellow card) 19'; Al-Qahtani 31'	Report	Al-Jamaan 23'	Stadium: Prince Faisal bin Fahd Stadium; Referee: Mohammed Al-Smail

5 January 2018 6	Al-Fateh (1)	1–0	Al-Hazem (2)	Al-Hasa
15:05	Sharahili 27'	Report		Stadium: Prince Abdullah bin Jalawi Stadium; Referee: Abdullah Al-Shehri

5 January 2018 13	Al-Mujazzal (2)	1–3	Al-Batin (1)	Al Majma'ah
15:20	Al-Yousef 5'; Al-Bishi (yellow card) 53'; Sidevaldo (yellow card) 75'; Al-Muraished (yellow card) 76'	Report	Tarabai 13', (yellow card) 74'; Metlaq 40'; Jhonnattann (yellow card) 44', (goal) 90+2'; Paulo (yellow card) 65'; Waqes (yellow card) 87'	Stadium: King Salman Sport City Stadium; Referee: Mohammed Al-Nuhait

5 January 2018 14	Al-Taawoun (1)	1–2	Damac (2)	Buraidah
15:25	Al-Maghrebi (yellow card) 16'; Al-Bishi 65'; Amissi (yellow card) 82'	Report	Al-Aliany 3' (pen.); Al-Qahtani (yellow card) 41'; Al-Najei (yellow card) 74'; Sharahili 75'; Al-Thunayan (yellow card) 83'; Al-Shahrani (yellow card) 86'	Stadium: King Abdullah Sport City Stadium; Referee: Khaled Al-Teris

5 January 2018 16	Al-Nassr (1)	2–0	Al-Zulfi (4)	Riyadh
19:20	Al-Mutlaq (yellow card) 39'; Ghaly (yellow card) 66'; Al-Sahlawi 70'; Leonardo 83'	Report	Al-Sabt (yellow card) 9'; Al-Sharid (yellow card) 32'	Stadium: King Fahd International Stadium; Referee: Shukri Al-Hanfosh

6 January 2018 5	Al-Qaisumah (2)	2–3 (a.e.t.)	Al-Fayha (1)	Hafar al-Batin
15:10	Al-Ruwailli (yellow card) 6'; Jowhar (yellow card) 60'; Al-Sahali 80'; Afana 87'	Report	Fernández (yellow card) 53', (goal) 62' (pen.), 107'; Al-Mutairi 86'; Asprilla (yellow card) 114'	Stadium: Al-Batin Club Stadium; Referee: Mishari Al-Mishari

6 January 2018 4	Al-Watani (2)	2–3 (a.e.t.)	Al-Faisaly (1)	Tabuk
15:55	Eisa 16', 53'; R. Al-Balawi (yellow card) 49'; N. Al-Balawi (yellow card) 87'; Majrashi (yellow card) 110'	Report	Abousaban 23'; Hamad (yellow card) 36'; Majrashi (yellow card) 51'; Rogério 80'; Al Mansor 91'	Stadium: King Khalid Sport City Stadium; Referee: Abdullah Al-Nahet

6 January 2018 15	Al-Raed (1)	0–1	Al-Nahda (2)	Buraidah
18:05	Al-Shamekh (yellow card) 25'; Al-Musalem (yellow card) 29'	Report	Al-Jadaani (yellow card) 36'; Al-Khamees 57'; Al-Hamdan (yellow card) 68'; Al-Merqeb (yellow card) 84'; Al-Maimouni (yellow card) 88'	Stadium: King Abdullah Sport City Stadium; Referee: Abdulrahman Al-Shehri

6 January 2018 8	Al-Shoulla (2)	0–2	Al-Ahli (1)	Al-Kharj
19:20		Report	Al-Moasher 7'; Fetfatzidis 20'; Asiri (yellow card) 52'; Oboabona (yellow card) 63'	Stadium: Al-Shoulla Club Stadium; Referee: Abdulrahman Al-Sultan

7 January 2018 11	Al-Shabab (1)	2–0	Najran (2)	Riyadh
18:00	Al Tawfiq 8' (o.g.); Al-Shamrani 45+1' (pen.)	Report	A. Al-Sqoor (yellow card) 42'; N. Al-Sqoor (yellow card) 90'	Stadium: Prince Faisal bin Fahd Stadium; Referee: Sultan Al-Harbi

7 January 2018 9	Al-Kawkab (2)	1–3	Al-Ittihad (1)	Al-Kharj
19:20	Al-Zahrani 24'; Al-Saeed (yellow card) 44'; Al-Shehri (yellow card) 45'; Al-Dubaisi (yellow card) 76'; Al-Zubaidi (yellow card) 83'	Report	Al-Muwallad (yellow card) 50'; Sufyani (yellow card) 53'; Villanueva (yellow card) 64', (goal) 69' (pen.); Akaïchi 81'; Kahraba 86'	Stadium: Al-Shoulla Club Stadium; Referee: Mohammed Al-Hoaish

== Round of 16 ==
The Round of 16 matches were played between 19 and 25 January 2018. All times are local, AST (UTC+3).

19 January 2018 21	Al-Ittihad (1)	2–1	Al-Ettifaq (1)	Jeddah
20:10	Villanueva 61'; Al-Muwallad 90+12'	Report	Kiss 39', (yellow card) 60'; Al-Saleh (yellow card) 57' (yellow-red card) 90+1'; Al Hajri (yellow card) 61'	Stadium: King Abdullah Sports City; Attendance: 44,010; Referee: Jonas Eriksson (Sweden)

20 January 2018 18	Al-Faisaly (1)	2–0	Al-Nojoom (2)	Al Majma'ah
15:30	Rogério 20'; Al-Mansor (yellow card) 26'; Majrashi 78'	Report	Al-Batran (yellow card) 33'; Al-Sobeai (yellow card) 45+1'	Stadium: King Salman Sport City Stadium; Referee: Ismail Elfath (United States)

20 January 2018 17	Al-Qadsiah (1)	1–0	Al-Hilal (1)	Khobar
18:00	Hervé (yellow card) 37'; Fallatah (yellow card) 42'; Bismark 55'; Barnawi (yellow card) 77' (yellow-red card) 88'	Report	Fallatah (yellow card) 42'; Otayf (yellow card) 67'; Milesi (yellow card) 89'	Stadium: Prince Saud bin Jalawi Stadium; Attendance: 3,749; Referee: Pavel Královec (Czech Republic)

20 January 2018 24	Al-Nassr (1)	1–0	Al-Nahda (2)	Riyadh
18:10	Al-Sahlawi 36'; Lagrou (yellow card) 69'	Report	Masrahi (yellow card) 14'; Al-Hamdan (yellow card) 45+1'	Stadium: Prince Faisal bin Fahd Stadium; Referee: Ovidiu Hațegan (Romania)

21 January 2018 20	Al-Ahli (1)	6–0	Al-Orobah (2)	Jeddah
18:45	Al-Moasher 33', 73'; Al-Mogahwi 41'; Fefatzidis 60'; Zakaria 90', 90+2'	Report	Al-Najei (yellow card) 24'	Stadium: King Abdullah Sports City; Attendance: 8,500; Referee: Andrew Dallas (Scotland)

24 January 2018 19	Al-Fayha (1)	2–1 (a.e.t.)	Al-Fateh (1)	Al Majma'ah
15:35	Al Salem 11'; Al-Khaibari (yellow card) 111', (goal) 118'	Report	Sakala 56'; João Pedro (yellow card) 68'; Al-Fuhaid (yellow card) 90+3'	Stadium: King Salman Sport City Stadium; Attendance: 423; Referee: Mark Clattenburg (England)

25 January 2018 23	Al-Batin (1)	2–0	Damac (2)	Hafar al-Batin
15:30	Guilherme 83'; Jorge Silva 84'	Report		Stadium: Al-Batin Club Stadium; Referee: Ivan Bebek (Croatia)

25 January 2018 22	Al-Shabab (1)	3–1	Al-Khaleej (2)	Riyadh
20:00	Khamees 30' (o.g.); Benyettou 45+1'; Ghazi (yellow card) 72'; Bahebri 87'	Report	Al-Najrani 22'; Khamees (yellow card) 63'	Stadium: Prince Faisal bin Fahd Stadium; Referee: Simon Lee Evans (Wales)

== Quarter-finals ==
The Quarter-finals matches were played between 22 and 25 February 2018. All times are local, AST (UTC+3).

22 February 2018 28	Al-Nassr (1)	0–1	Al-Batin (1)	Riyadh
20:00	Madu (yellow card) 68'; Al-Fraidi (yellow card) 73'	Report	Nasser (yellow card) 15'; Jhonnattann 18'; Diabaté (yellow card) 21'; Al-Shammeri (yellow card) 51'; Guilherme (yellow card) 56'; Al-Jouei (yellow card) 58'; Khodari (yellow card) 66'; Mathlouthi (yellow card) 78'; Paulo (yellow card) 79'	Stadium: Prince Faisal bin Fahd Stadium; Referee: Simon Lee Evans (Wales)

23 February 2018 27	Al-Ittihad (1)	3–1	Al-Shabab (1)	Jeddah
20:30	Al-Nakhli (yellow card) 11', (goal) 26'; Fallatah 39'; Kahraba 45'	Report	Al-Fahad (yellow card) 45'; Majrashi (yellow card) 56'; Ubilla 90+1'	Stadium: King Abdullah Sports City; Attendance: 57,810; Referee: Pawel Raczkowski (Poland)

24 February 2018 26	Al-Fayha (1)	2–2 (a.e.t.) (3–4 p)	Al-Ahli (1)	Al Majma'ah
18:40	Gómez 21'; Izaguirre (yellow card) 50'; Fernández (yellow card) 53'; Jaafari (yellow card) 81'; Asprilla (yellow card) 93', (goal) 100'; Al-Sobhi (yellow card) 120+1'	Report	Balghaith (yellow card) 48' (yellow-red card) 112'; Bakshween (yellow card) 60'; Al-Amri 85'; Asiri 109'	Stadium: King Salman Sport City Stadium; Attendance: 2,278; Referee: Simon Lee Evans (Wales)
	Penalties
	Tziolis (penalty scored); Asprilla (penalty scored); Al-Mutairi (penalty missed); Al-Sobhi (penalty missed); Fernández (penalty scored); Izaguirre (penalty missed)		Fetfatzidis (penalty scored); Milligan (penalty missed); Al-Amri (penalty missed); Leonardo (penalty scored); Awagi (penalty scored); Ben Amor (penalty scored)

25 February 2018 25	Al-Qadsiah (1)	2–3	Al-Faisaly (1)	Khobar
18:20	Hervé 11'; Al-Khabrani (yellow card) 47'; Jorginho 62'; Al-Shoeil (yellow card) 78'; Camara (yellow card) 79'; Al-Jizani (yellow card) 82'; Fallatah (yellow card) 90+1'	Report	Gomaa (yellow card) 16'; Luisinho 48' (pen.); Majrashi 54' (pen.); Rogério 59', (yellow card) 64'; Zé Eduardo (yellow card) 90+5'	Stadium: Prince Saud bin Jalawi Stadium; Referee: Paweł Raczkowski (Poland)

== Semi-finals ==
The Semi-finals matches were played on 30 and 31 March 2018. All times are local, AST (UTC+3).

30 March 2018 29	Al-Faisaly (1)	1–0	Al-Ahli (1)	Al Majma'ah
20:35	Zé Eduardo 77'	Report	Al-Shamrani (red card) 90+6'	Stadium: King Salman Sport City Stadium; Referee: Danny Makkelie (Netherlands)

1 April 2018 30	Al-Batin (1)	2–6	Al-Ittihad (1)	Hafar al-Batin
20:35	Guilherme 2'; Tinga 62'; Waqes (yellow card) 87'; Ghunaiman (yellow card) 90' (yellow-red card) 90+4'	Report	Villanueva 5', 88' (pen.); Al-Ghamdi 68', 72'; Akaïchi 77', (yellow card) 78'; Al-Muziel (yellow card) 89'; Al-Aryani 90+2'	Stadium: Al-Batin Club Stadium; Referee: Shukri Al-Hanfoush

== Final ==
The final was held on 12 May 2018. All times are local, AST (UTC+3).

12 May 2018
21:00

Al-Faisaly	1–3 (a.e.t.)	Al-Ittihad
Luisinho (yellow card) 67'; Al-Robeai (yellow card) 84', (goal) 90+2'	Report	Assiri (yellow card) 19'; Al-Ghamdi 45'; Akaïchi (yellow card) 70'; Sufyani 100'; Al-Aryani 116'

King Abdullah Sports City, Jeddah
Attendance: 60,184
Referee: Mark Clattenburg (England)

== Top goalscorers ==
As of 12 May 2018

Rank	Player	Club	Goals
1	(Chile) Carlos Villanueva	Al-Ittihad	4
2	(Saudi Arabia) Mohammed Al-Saiari	Al-Ettifaq	3
2	(Saudi Arabia) Salman Al-Moasher	Al-Ahli	3
2	(Brazil) Rogério	Al-Faisaly	3
2	(Saudi Arabia) Abdulrahman Al-Ghamdi	Al-Ittihad	3

Note: Players and teams marked in bold are still active in the competition.

== See also ==
- 2017–18 Saudi Professional League
- 2017–18 Prince Mohammad bin Salman League
- 2017–18 Crown Prince Cup
