= 2017–18 Saudi Crown Prince Cup =

2017–18 Crown Prince Cup
Tournament details
- Country: Saudi Arabia
- Dates: 7 September 2017 – 19 September 2017
- Teams: 14

Tournament statistics
- Matches played: 4
- Goals scored: 5 (1.25 per match)
- Top goal scorer(s): Andria; Abdelkader Oueslati; Shikabala; Danilo Asprilla; Marcos Pizzelli (1 goal each)
- All statistics correct as of 19 September 2017.

The 2017–18 Crown Prince Cup was the 43rd and final unfinished season of the Saudi premier knockout tournament for football teams of the Saudi Professional League. It began on 7 September 2017 and would have been concluded with the final in March 2018. However, it was abolished early during the first stage.

Al-Ittihad are the defending champions after a 1–0 win over Al-Nassr in the final.

On 19 September 2017, the General Sports Authority decided to cancel and abolish the tournament and start the new edition next season.

== Changes and Format ==
For the first time, the Crown Prince Cup tournament will be contested by the 14 teams of the Pro League, having been decreased from the 30-team format that had been used since the 2013–14 season. Under this new format, the finalists from the previous season will receive a bye to the knockout stage while the remaining 12 enter at the preliminary round. The Crown Prince Cup is played as a knockout cup competition with each tie being played as a single match with the winner advancing to the next round.

On 16 June 2017 it was announced by the SAFF that VAR would be implemented in the tournament.

== Participating teams ==
Pro League (14 Teams)

- Al-Ahli
- Al-Batin
- Al-Ettifaq
- Al-Faisaly
- Al-Fateh
- Al-Fayha
- Al-Hilal
- Al-Ittihad (Quarter-finals direct entrants)
- Al-Nassr (Quarter-finals direct entrants)
- Al-Qadisiyah
- Al-Raed
- Al-Shabab
- Al-Taawoun
- Ohod

== First stage ==
=== Round of 16 ===
The Round of 16 matches are to be played from 7 September to 30 October 2017. All times are local, AST (UTC+3).

| 7 September 2017 5 | Ohod | 1–1 (a.e.t.) (4–5 p) | Al-Fateh | Medinah |
| 20:35 | Andria 83'; Badi (yellow card) 106'; Ashoor (yellow card) 120+1' | Report | Al-Fuhaid (yellow card) 41'; Oueslati 90+4' (pen.) | Stadium: Prince Mohammed bin Abdul Aziz Stadium; Referee: Hussain Abu Shaheen |
| | Penalties |
| | Andria (penalty scored); Ronaldo (penalty scored); Ahmed (penalty missed); Mohsen (penalty scored); Badi (penalty scored) | | (penalty scored) Oueslati; (penalty scored) Al-Mousa; (penalty scored) João Pedro; (penalty scored) Hazzazi; (penalty scored) Al-Juahaim |

| 8 September 2017 1 | Al-Raed | 1–0 | Al-Faisaly | Buraidah |
| 19:00 | Shikabala 3'; Al-Rashidi (yellow card) 51'; Otaif (yellow card) 61' | Report | Luisinho (yellow card) 29'; Mendash (yellow card) 88' | Stadium: King Abdullah Sport City Stadium; Attendance: 780; Referee: Faisal Al-Blwi |

| 9 September 2017 2 | Al-Fayha | 1–0 | Al-Taawoun | Al Majma'ah |
| 18:50 | Asprilla 13'; Tombakti (yellow card) 28'; Al-Mutairi (yellow card) 51' | Report | Al-Mousa (yellow card) 52'; Al-Zubaidi (yellow card) 89' | Stadium: King Salman Sport City Stadium; Attendance: 791; Referee: Abdullah Al-Nuhait |

| 9 September 2017 4 | Al-Shabab | 1–0 | Al-Batin | Riyadh |
| 20:05 | Al-Fahad (yellow card) 64'; Pizzelli 68'; Salem (yellow card) 81' | Report | Jhonnattann (yellow card) 40'; Waqes (yellow card) 58'; Alhinho (yellow card) 72'; Jorge Santos (yellow card) 90' | Stadium: Prince Faisal bin Fahd Stadium; Attendance: 1,042; Referee: Abdulrahman Al-Shehri |

| 30 October 2017 3 | Al-Qadsiah | Cancelled | Al-Hilal | Khobar |
| 19:30 | | | | Stadium: Prince Saud bin Jalawi Stadium |

| 30 October 2017 6 | Al-Ettifaq | Cancelled | Al-Ahli | Dammam |
| 19:30 | | | | Stadium: Prince Mohamed bin Fahd Stadium |

== Top goalscorers ==
As of 9 September 2017

| Rank | Player | Club | Goals |
|---|---|---|---|
| 1 | (Madagascar) Andria | Ohod | 1 |
| 1 | (Tunisia) **Abdelkader Oueslati** | Al-Fateh | 1 |
| 1 | (Egypt) **Shikabala** | Al-Raed | 1 |
| 1 | (Colombia) **Danilo Asprilla** | Al-Fayha | 1 |
| 1 | (Armenia) **Marcos Pizzelli** | Al-Shabab | 1 |

Note: Players and teams marked in bold are still active in the competition.
