= Pitty (disambiguation) =

Pitty can refer to:

- IWL Pitty, an East German 1950s motor scooter
- Joseph Pitty Couthouy (1808–64), a United States Navy officer
- Priscilla Novaes Leone (born 1977), a Brazilian singer whose stage name is Pitty
- Pitty Und Ihre Beatchicks, singer on Decca Germany, "Teenage Love" 1965
- Pitty (footballer) (born 1987), Luiz Paulo Daniel Barbosa, Brazilian footballer
