= Mosaab Al-Otaibi =

Saudi Arabian footballer

Personal information
- Full name: Mosaab Bander Al-Otaibi
- Date of birth: March 3, 1992 (age 34)
- Place of birth: Riyadh, Saudi Arabia
- Height: 1.68 m (5 ft 6 in)
- Positions: Attacking midfielder; winger

Youth career
- 2007–2013: Al-Nassr

Senior career*
Years	Team	Apps	(Gls)
2013–2017	Al-Nassr	2	(0)
2015–2016	→ Al-Khaleej (loan)	23	(3)
2016–2017	→ Al-Taawon (loan)	5	(0)
2017	→ Al Faisaly (loan)	4	(0)
2017–2018	Al-Batin	9	(0)
2019	Al-Adalh		
- * Club domestic league appearances and goals

Mosaab Bander Al-Otaibi (Arabic: مصعب بندر العتيبي; born 3 March 1992) is a Saudi professional footballer who most recently played for Al-Adalh. He primarily plays as a winger or as an attacking midfielder.

== Career statistics ==
As of 12 April 2018

Club	Season	League		King Cup		Crown Prince Cup		Asia		Total	
Club	Season	Apps	Goals	Apps	Goals	Apps	Goals	Apps	Goals	Apps	Goals
Al-Nassr
Al-Nassr	2014–15	1	0	0	0	0	0	1	0	2	0
Al-Nassr	2015–16	1	0	0	0	1	0	0	0	2	0
Total		2	0	0	0	1	0	1	0	4	0
Al-Khaleej (loan)	2015–16	23	3	1	0	0	0	—		24	3
Al-Khaleej (loan)	Total	23	3	1	0	0	0	0	0	24	3
Al-Taawoun (loan)	2016–17	5	0	0	0	1	0	—		6	0
Al-Taawoun (loan)	Total	5	0	0	0	1	0	0	0	6	0
Al-Faisaly (loan)	2016–17	4	0	0	0	0	0	—		4	0
Al-Faisaly (loan)	Total	4	0	0	0	0	0	0	0	4	0
Al-Batin	2017–18	9	0	1	0	1	0	—		11	0
Al-Batin	Total	9	0	1	0	1	0	0	0	11	0
Career Total		43	3	2	0	3	0	1	0	49	3

== Honours ==
=== Clubs ===
Al-Nassr

- Saudi Professional League 2014–15
