= Majed Kanabah =

Saudi Arabian footballer (born 1993)

Majed Kanabah ماجد كنبه
Personal information
- Full name: Majed Omar Kanabah
- Date of birth: 27 February 1993 (age 33)
- Place of birth: Jeddah, Saudi Arabia
- Height: 1.74 m (5 ft 9 in)
- Positions: Central midfielder; defensive midfielder

Team information
- Current team: Al-Khaleej
- Number: 12

Youth career
- –2016: Al-Ittihad

Senior career*
Years	Team	Apps	(Gls)
2016	Al-Ahli	0	(0)
2017–2019	Al-Batin	43	(0)
2019–2023	Al-Fateh	56	(3)
2023–2025	Al-Shabab	57	(1)
2025–	Al-Khaleej	0	(0)
- * Club domestic league appearances and goals as of 26 May 2025

Majed Kanabah (Arabic: ماجد كنبه; born 27 February 1993) is a Saudi Arabian professional footballer who plays as a central midfielder for Pro League side Al-Khaleej.

== Club career ==
Kanabah was the captain of Al-Ittihad's U23 team. On 4 February 2016, Kanabah joined city rivals Al-Ahli on a free transfer. He was released during the summer of 2016 and spent a year without a club. He joined Al-Batin on a one-year contract during the summer of 2017. He renewed his contract on 29 May 2018. On 30 May 2019, Kanabah joined Al-Fateh on a free transfer. On 19 April 2021, Kanabah renewed his contract with Al-Fateh. On 26 January 2023, Kanabah joined Al-Shabab. On 9 July 2025, Kanabah joined Al-Khaleej.

== Career statistics ==
=== Club ===
As of 27 May 2025

Club	Season	League			King Cup		Asia		Other		Total	
Club	Season	Division	Apps	Goals	Apps	Goals	Apps	Goals	Apps	Goals	Apps	Goals
Al-Ahli	2015–16	Pro League	0	0	0	0	0	0	–	–	0	0
Al-Batin	2017–18	Pro League	20	0	3	0	–	–	1 (Note: Appearance(s) in Crown Prince Cup)	0	24	0
Al-Batin	2018–19	Pro League	23	0	2	0	–	–	–	–	25	0
Al-Batin	Total		43	0	5	0	0	0	1	0	49	0
Al-Fateh	2019–20	Pro League	13	0	0	0	–	–	–	–	13	0
Al-Fateh	2020–21	Pro League	10	0	2	0	–	–	–	–	12	0
Al-Fateh	2021–22	Pro League	21	0	1	0	–	–	–	–	22	0
Al-Fateh	2022–23	Pro League	12	3	1	0	–	–	–	–	13	3
Al-Fateh	Total		56	3	4	0	0	0	0	0	60	3
Al-Shabab	2022–23	Pro League	5	0	0	0	1	0	3 (Note: Appearances in Arab Club Champions Cup)	0	9	0
Al-Shabab	2023–24	Pro League	24	0	3	0	–	–	4	0	31	0
Al-Shabab	2024–25	Pro League	28	1	3	0	–	–	–	–	31	1
Al-Shabab	Total		57	1	6	0	1	0	7	0	71	1
Al-Khaleej	2025–26	Pro League	0	0	0	0	–	–	–	–	0	0
Career Total			156	4	15	0	1	0	8	0	180	4
