= Sultan Masrahi =

Saudi Arabian footballer

Sultan Masarhi
Personal information
- Full name: Sultan Mohammed Masarhi
- Date of birth: May 31, 1987 (age 39)
- Place of birth: Saudi Arabia
- Height: 1.88 m (6 ft 2 in)
- Position: Center back

Youth career
- Al-Hilal

Senior career*
Years	Team	Apps	(Gls)
2008–2017	Al-Qadsiah	?	(?)
2017	→ Al-Nahda (loan)	?	(?)
2017–2019	Al-Batin	37	(1)
2019–2020	Damac	0	(0)
2020	Al-Khaleej	0	(0)
2020–2021	Al-Thoqbah	7	(0)
2021–2022	Al-Safa		
2022–2023	Al-Noor		
2023–2024	Al-Thoqbah		
- * Club domestic league appearances and goals

Sultan Masrahi (Arabic: سلطان مسرحي; born 31 May 1987) is a Saudi Arabian professional footballer who plays as a center back.
