= 2019 AFC Champions League =

38th edition of premier club football tournament organized by the AFC

Tournament details
- Dates: Qualifying: 5–19 February 2019; Competition proper: 4 March – 24 November 2019
- Teams: Competition proper: 32; Total: 51 (from 22 associations)

Final positions
- Champions: (Saudi Arabia) Al-Hilal (3rd title)
- Runners-up: (Japan) Urawa Red Diamonds

Tournament statistics
- Matches played: 126
- Goals scored: 354 (2.81 per match)
- Attendance: 1,796,810 (14,260 per match)
- Top scorer(s): Bafétimbi Gomis (11 goals)
- Best player: Bafétimbi Gomis
- Fair play award: (Japan) Urawa Red Diamonds
- (Note: All statistics do not include qualifying play-offs)

The 2019 AFC Champions League was the 38th edition of Asia's premier club football tournament, organized by the Asian Football Confederation (AFC), and the 17th under the current AFC Champions League title.

Al-Hilal defeated Urawa Red Diamonds 3–0 on aggregate in the final to earn a record-tying third Champions League title. As winners, they qualified for the 2019 FIFA Club World Cup in Qatar.

Kashima Antlers were the defending champions, but they were eliminated by Guangzhou Evergrande in the quarter-finals on away goals.

== Association team allocation ==
The 46 AFC member associations (excluding the associate member Northern Mariana Islands) were ranked, based on their national team's and clubs' performance over the last four years in AFC competitions, with the allocation of slots for the 2019 and 2020 editions of the AFC club competitions determined by the 2017 AFC rankings (Entry Manual Article 2.3):

- The associations were split into two regions:
  - West Region consisted of the associations from the West Asian Football Federation (WAFF), the Central Asian Football Association (CAFA), and the South Asian Football Federation (SAFF).
  - East Region consisted of the associations from the ASEAN Football Federation (AFF) and the East Asian Football Federation (EAFF).
- In each region, there were four groups in the group stage, including a total of 12 direct slots, with the 4 remaining slots filled through play-offs.
- The top 12 associations in each region as per the AFC rankings were eligible to enter the AFC Champions League, as long as they fulfill the AFC Champions League criteria.
- The top six associations in each region got at least one direct slot in the group stage, while the remaining associations get only play-off slots (as well as AFC Cup group stage slots):
  - The associations ranked 1st and 2nd each got three direct slots and one play-off slot.
  - The associations ranked 3rd and 4th each got two direct slots and two play-off slots.
  - The associations ranked 5th each got one direct slot and two play-off slots.
  - The associations ranked 6th each got one direct slot and one play-off slot.
  - The associations ranked 7th to 12th each got one play-off slot.
- The maximum number of slots for each association was one-third of the total number of eligible teams in the top division.
- If any association gave up its direct slots, they were redistributed to the highest eligible association, with each association limited to a maximum of three direct slots.
- If any association gave up its play-off slots, they were annulled and not redistributed to any other association.

=== Association ranking ===
For the 2019 AFC Champions League, the associations were allocated slots according to their association ranking which was published on 15 December 2017, which took into account their performance in the AFC Champions League and the AFC Cup, as well as their national team's FIFA World Rankings, between 2014 and 2017.

Participation for 2019 AFC Champions League
Participating
Not participating

West Region
Rank		Member Association	Points	Slots			
Rank		Member Association	Points	Group stage	Play-off		
Region	AFC	Member Association	Points	Group stage	Play-off round	Prelim. round 2	Prelim. round 1
1	1	United Arab Emirates	95.940	3	1	0	0
2	4	Saudi Arabia	84.269	3	1	0	0
3	6	Qatar	82.407	2	2	0	0
4	7	Iran	71.851	2	0	2	0
5	9	Uzbekistan	43.305	1	0	2	0
6	11	Iraq	42.141	1	0	1	0
7	12	Tajikistan	30.725	0	0	1	0
8	15	India	29.291	0	0	1	0
9	16	Syria	28.983	0	0	0	0
10	18	Jordan	25.649	0	0	0	1
11	19	Kuwait	24.798	0	0	0	1
12	20	Bahrain	24.337	0	0	0	0
Total				12	4	7	2
Total				12	13		
Total				25			

East Region
Rank		Member Association	Points	Slots			
Rank		Member Association	Points	Group stage	Play-off		
Region	AFC	Member Association	Points	Group stage	Play-off round	Prelim. round 2	Prelim. round 1
1	2	South Korea	87.480	3	1	0	0
2	3	China	86.671	3	1	0	0
3	5	Japan	83.464	2	2	0	0
4	8	Australia	64.752	2	0	1	0
5	10	Thailand	42.568	1	0	2	0
6	13	Malaysia	29.566	1	0	1	0
7	14	Hong Kong	29.300	0	0	1	0
8	17	Vietnam	27.426	0	0	1	0
9	21	Philippines	21.405	0	0	0	1
10	23	Singapore	17.084	0	0	0	1
11	24	Indonesia	16.871	0	0	0	1
12	25	Myanmar	14.753	0	0	0	1
Total				12	4	6	4
Total				12	14		
Total				26			

Notes

1. Australia (AUS): The top division run by the Football Federation Australia, the A-League, only had nine Australia-based teams in the 2017–18 season, so Australia could only get a maximum of three total slots (Entry Manual 5.4).
2. Bahrain (BHR): Bahrain did not have any teams which had an AFC Champions League license.
3. Syria (SYR): Syria did not implement the AFC Champions League club licensing system.

== Teams ==
The following 51 teams from 22 associations entered the competition.

In the following table, the number of appearances and last appearance count only those since the 2002–03 season (including qualifying rounds), when the competition was rebranded as the AFC Champions League. TH means title holders.

West RegionGroup stage direct entrants (Groups A–D)
Team	Qualifying method	App (Last)
(United Arab Emirates) Al-Ain	2017–18 UAE Pro-League champions and 2017–18 UAE President's Cup winners	14th (2018)
(United Arab Emirates) Al-Wahda	2017–18 UAE Pro-League runners-up	10th (2018)
(United Arab Emirates) Al-Wasl	2017–18 UAE Pro-League 3rd place	3rd (2018)
(Saudi Arabia) Al-Hilal	2017–18 Saudi Professional League champions	15th (2018)
(Saudi Arabia) Al-Ittihad	2018 King Cup winners	11th (2016)
(Saudi Arabia) Al-Ahli	2017–18 Saudi Professional League runners-up	11th (2018)
(Qatar) Al-Duhail	2017–18 Qatar Stars League champions and 2018 Emir of Qatar Cup winners	8th (2018)
(Qatar) Al-Sadd	2017–18 Qatar Stars League runners-up	14th (2018)
(Iran) Persepolis	2017–18 Persian Gulf Pro League champions and 2018 Iranian Super Cup winners	8th (2018)
(Iran) Esteghlal	2017–18 Hazfi Cup winners 2017–18 Persian Gulf Pro League 3rd place	10th (2018)
(Uzbekistan) Lokomotiv Tashkent	2018 Uzbekistan Super League champions	7th (2018)
(Iraq) Al-Zawraa	2017–18 Iraqi Premier League champions	4th (2007)

Qualifying play-off participants: Entering in play-off round
Team	Qualifying method	App (Last)
(United Arab Emirates) Al-Nasr	2017–18 UAE Pro-League 4th place	4th (2016)
(Saudi Arabia) Al-Nassr	2017–18 Saudi Professional League 3rd place	4th (2016)
(Qatar) Al-Rayyan	2017–18 Qatar Stars League 3rd place	9th (2018)
(Qatar) Al-Gharafa	2017–18 Qatar Stars League 4th place	10th (2018)

Qualifying play-off participants: Entering in preliminary round 2
Team	Qualifying method	App (Last)
(Iran) Zob Ahan	2017–18 Persian Gulf Pro League runners-up	8th (2018)
(Iran) Saipa	2017–18 Persian Gulf Pro League 4th place	2nd (2008)
(Uzbekistan) AGMK	2018 Uzbekistan Cup winners	1st
(Uzbekistan) Pakhtakor	2018 Uzbekistan Super League runners-up	15th (2018)
(Iraq) Al-Quwa Al-Jawiya	2017–18 Iraqi Premier League runners-up	4th (2008)
(Tajikistan) Istiklol	2018 Tajik League champions	1st
(India) Minerva Punjab	2017–18 I-League champions	1st

Qualifying play-off participants: Entering in preliminary round 1
Team	Qualifying method	App (Last)
(Jordan) Al-Wehdat	2017–18 Jordanian Pro League champions	5th (2017)
Al-Kuwait	2017–18 Kuwaiti Premier League champions	6th (2014)

East RegionGroup stage direct entrants (Groups E–H)
Team	Qualifying method	App (Last)
(South Korea) Jeonbuk Hyundai Motors	2018 K League 1 champions	12th (2018)
(South Korea) Daegu FC	2018 Korean FA Cup winners	1st
(South Korea) Gyeongnam FC	2018 K League 1 runners-up	1st
(China) Shanghai SIPG	2018 Chinese Super League champions	4th (2018)
(China) Beijing FC	2018 Chinese FA Cup winners	8th (2015)
(China) Guangzhou Evergrande	2018 Chinese Super League runners-up	8th (2018)
(Japan) Kawasaki Frontale	2018 J1 League champions	7th (2018)
(Japan) Urawa Red Diamonds	2018 Emperor's Cup winners	7th (2017)
(Australia) Sydney FC	2017–18 A-League premiers	5th (2018)
(Australia) Melbourne Victory	2018 A-League Grand Final winners	7th (2018)
(Thailand) Buriram United	2018 Thai League 1 champions	8th (2018)
(Malaysia) Johor Darul Ta'zim	2018 Malaysia Super League champions	5th (2018)

Qualifying play-off participants: Entering in play-off round
Team	Qualifying method	App (Last)
(South Korea) Ulsan Hyundai	2018 K League 1 3rd place	7th (2018)
(China) Shandong Luneng	2018 Chinese Super League 3rd place	9th (2016)
(Japan) Sanfrecce Hiroshima	2018 J1 League runners-up	5th (2016)
(Japan) Kashima Antlers^{TH}	2018 J1 League 3rd place	9th (2018)

Qualifying play-off participants: Entering in preliminary round 2
Team	Qualifying method	App (Last)
(Australia) Newcastle Jets	2017–18 A-League regular season runners-up	2nd (2009)
(Thailand) Chiangrai United	2018 Thai FA Cup winners	2nd (2018)
(Thailand) Bangkok United	2018 Thai League 1 runners-up	3rd (2017)
(Malaysia) Perak	2018 Malaysia Super League runners-up	1st
(Hong Kong) Kitchee	2017–18 Hong Kong Premier League champions	5th (2018)
(Vietnam) Hanoi	2018 V.League 1 champions	5th (2017)

Qualifying play-off participants: Entering in preliminary round 1
Team	Qualifying method	App (Last)
(Philippines) Ceres–Negros	2018 Philippines Football League champions	2nd (2018)
(Singapore) Home United	2018 Singapore Premier League runners-up	2nd (2002–03)
(Indonesia) Persija Jakarta	2018 Liga 1 champions	1st
(Myanmar) Yangon United	2018 Myanmar National League champions	2nd (2016)

Notes

1. Malaysia (MAS): Pahang, the 2018 Malaysia FA Cup winners, were suspended from all AFC tournaments for not being permitted to apply for AFC licenses for two years. As a result, Perak, the 2018 Malaysia Super League runners-up, entered the qualifying play-offs.
2. Singapore (SIN): Albirex Niigata Singapore, the 2018 Singapore Premier League champions, is a satellite team of Japanese club Albirex Niigata and thus ineligible to represent Singapore in AFC club competitions. As a result, Home United, the league runners-up, entered the qualifying play-offs.
Location of teams of the 2019 AFC Champions League.
West Region
East Region
(p) Qualifying play-off participants

== Schedule ==
The schedule of the competition is as follows.

Stage	Round	Draw date	First leg	Second leg
Preliminary stage	Preliminary round 1	No draw	5 February 2019	
Preliminary stage	Preliminary round 2	No draw	12 February 2019	
Play-off stage	Play-off round	No draw	19 February 2019	
Group stage	Matchday 1	22 November 2018	4–6 March 2019	
Group stage	Matchday 2	22 November 2018	11–13 March 2019	
Group stage	Matchday 3	22 November 2018	8–10 April 2019	
Group stage	Matchday 4	22 November 2018	22–24 April 2019	
Group stage	Matchday 5	22 November 2018	6–8 May 2019	
Group stage	Matchday 6	22 November 2018	20–22 May 2019	
Knockout stage	Round of 16	22 November 2018	18–19 June 2019 (E), 5–6 August 2019 (W)	25–26 June 2019 (E), 12–13 August 2019 (W)
Knockout stage	Quarter-finals	2 July 2019	26–28 August 2019	16–18 September 2019
Knockout stage	Semi-finals	2 July 2019	1–2 October 2019	22–23 October 2019
Knockout stage	Final	2 July 2019	9 November 2019	24 November 2019

== Qualifying play-offs ==
In the qualifying play-offs, each tie was played as a single match. Extra time and penalty shoot-out were used to decide the winner if necessary (Regulations Article 9.2). The eight winners of the play-off round (four each from both West Region and East Region) advanced to the group stage to join the 24 direct entrants. All losers in each round from associations with only play-off slot entered the AFC Cup group stage. The bracket of the qualifying play-offs for each region, determined based on the association ranking of each team, with the team from the higher-ranked association hosting the match, was officially announced by the AFC prior to the group stage draw on 22 November 2018. Teams from the same association could not be placed into the same tie.

=== Preliminary round 1 ===
West Region
Team 1	Score	Team 2
Al-Wehdat (Jordan)	2–3	Al-Kuwait

East Region
Team 1	Score	Team 2
Ceres–Negros (Philippines)	1–2	(Myanmar) Yangon United
Home United (Singapore)	1–3	(Indonesia) Persija Jakarta

=== Preliminary round 2 ===
West Region
Team 1	Score	Team 2
Pakhtakor (Uzbekistan)	2–1	(Iraq) Al-Quwa Al-Jawiya
AGMK (Uzbekistan)	4–2	(Tajikistan) Istiklol
Saipa (Iran)	4–0	(India) Minerva Punjab
Zob Ahan (Iran)	1–0 (a.e.t.)	Al-Kuwait

East Region
Team 1	Score	Team 2
Perak (Malaysia)	1–1 (a.e.t.) (6–5 p)	(Hong Kong) Kitchee
Bangkok United (Thailand)	0–1	(Vietnam) Hanoi
Chiangrai United (Thailand)	3–1	(Myanmar) Yangon United
Newcastle Jets (Australia)	3–1 (a.e.t.)	(Indonesia) Persija Jakarta

=== Play-off round ===
West Region
Team 1	Score	Team 2
Al-Nasr (United Arab Emirates)	1–2	(Uzbekistan) Pakhtakor
Al-Nassr (Saudi Arabia)	4–0	(Uzbekistan) AGMK
Al-Rayyan (Qatar)	3–1	(Iran) Saipa
Al-Gharafa (Qatar)	2–3	(Iran) Zob Ahan

East Region
Team 1	Score	Team 2
Ulsan Hyundai (South Korea)	5–1	(Malaysia) Perak
Shandong Luneng (China)	4–1	(Vietnam) Hanoi
Sanfrecce Hiroshima (Japan)	0–0 (a.e.t.) (4–3 p)	(Thailand) Chiangrai United
Kashima Antlers (Japan)	4–1	(Australia) Newcastle Jets

== Group stage ==
The draw for the group stage was held on 22 November 2018, 16:30 MYT (UTC+8), at the AFC House in Kuala Lumpur, Malaysia. The 32 teams were drawn into eight groups of four: four groups each in the West Region (Groups A–D) and the East Region (Groups E–H). Teams from the same association could not be drawn into the same group. In the group stage, each group was played on a home-and-away round-robin basis. The winners and runners-up of each group advanced to the round of 16 of the knockout stage.

Tiebreakers

The teams were ranked according to points (3 points for a win, 1 point for a draw, 0 points for a loss). If tied on points, tiebreakers were applied in the following order (Regulations Article 10.5):

1. Points in head-to-head matches among tied teams;
2. Goal difference in head-to-head matches among tied teams;
3. Goals scored in head-to-head matches among tied teams;
4. Away goals scored in head-to-head matches among tied teams;
5. If more than two teams were tied, and after applying all head-to-head criteria above, a subset of teams were still tied, all head-to-head criteria above were reapplied exclusively to this subset of teams;
6. Goal difference in all group matches;
7. Goals scored in all group matches;
8. Penalty shoot-out if only two teams playing each other in the last round of the group were tied;
9. Disciplinary points (yellow card = 1 point, red card as a result of two yellow cards = 3 points, direct red card = 3 points, yellow card followed by direct red card = 4 points);
10. Association ranking.

=== Group A ===
Pos	Team	Pld	W	D	L	GF	GA	GD	Pts	Qualification	ZOB	NAS	ZAW	WAS
1	(Iran) Zob Ahan	6	3	3	0	10	5	+5	12	Advance to knockout stage	—	0–0	0–0	2–0
2	(Saudi Arabia) Al-Nassr	6	3	1	2	11	7	+4	10	Advance to knockout stage	2–3	—	4–1	3–1
3	(Iraq) Al-Zawraa	6	2	2	2	14	9	+5	8		2–2	1–2	—	5–0
4	(United Arab Emirates) Al-Wasl	6	1	0	5	4	18	−14	3		1–3	1–0	1–5	—

Source: AFC

=== Group B ===
Pos	Team	Pld	W	D	L	GF	GA	GD	Pts	Qualification	WAH	ITH	LOK	RAY
1	(United Arab Emirates) Al-Wahda	6	4	1	1	14	9	+5	13	Advance to knockout stage	—	4–1	3–1	4–3
2	(Saudi Arabia) Al-Ittihad	6	3	2	1	13	9	+4	11	Advance to knockout stage	1–1	—	3–2	5–1
3	(Uzbekistan) Lokomotiv Tashkent	6	2	1	3	10	11	−1	7		2–0	1–1	—	3–2
4	(Qatar) Al-Rayyan	6	1	0	5	9	17	−8	3		1–2	0–2	2–1	—

Source: AFC

=== Group C ===
Pos	Team	Pld	W	D	L	GF	GA	GD	Pts	Qualification	HIL	DUH	EST	AIN
1	(Saudi Arabia) Al-Hilal	6	4	1	1	10	5	+5	13	Advance to knockout stage	—	3–1	1–0	2–0
2	(Qatar) Al-Duhail	6	2	3	1	11	8	+3	9	Advance to knockout stage	2–2	—	3–0	2–2
3	(Iran) Esteghlal	6	2	2	2	6	8	−2	8		2–1	1–1	—	1–1
4	(United Arab Emirates) Al-Ain	6	0	2	4	4	10	−6	2		0–1	0–2	1–2	—

Source: AFC

=== Group D ===
Pos	Team	Pld	W	D	L	GF	GA	GD	Pts	Qualification	SAD	AHL	PAK	PER
1	(Qatar) Al-Sadd	6	3	1	2	7	8	−1	10	Advance to knockout stage	—	2–1	2–1	1–0
2	(Saudi Arabia) Al-Ahli	6	3	0	3	7	7	0	9	Advance to knockout stage	2–0	—	2–1	2–1
3	(Uzbekistan) Pakhtakor	6	2	2	2	7	7	0	8		2–2	1–0	—	1–0
4	(Iran) Persepolis	6	2	1	3	6	5	+1	7		2–0	2–0	1–1	—

Source: AFC

=== Group E ===
Pos	Team	Pld	W	D	L	GF	GA	GD	Pts	Qualification	SDL	KAS	GYE	JDT
1	(China) Shandong Luneng	6	3	2	1	10	8	+2	11	Advance to knockout stage	—	2–2	2–1	2–1
2	(Japan) Kashima Antlers	6	3	1	2	9	8	+1	10	Advance to knockout stage	2–1	—	0–1	2–1
3	(South Korea) Gyeongnam FC	6	2	2	2	9	8	+1	8		2–2	2–3	—	2–0
4	(Malaysia) Johor Darul Ta'zim	6	1	1	4	4	8	−4	4		0–1	1–0	1–1	—

Source: AFC

=== Group F ===
Pos	Team	Pld	W	D	L	GF	GA	GD	Pts	Qualification	SAN	GZE	DAE	MVC
1	(Japan) Sanfrecce Hiroshima	6	5	0	1	9	4	+5	15	Advance to knockout stage	—	1–0	2–0	2–1
2	(China) Guangzhou Evergrande	6	3	1	2	9	5	+4	10	Advance to knockout stage	2–0	—	1–0	4–0
3	(South Korea) Daegu FC	6	3	0	3	10	6	+4	9		0–1	3–1	—	4–0
4	(Australia) Melbourne Victory	6	0	1	5	4	17	−13	1		1–3	1–1	1–3	—

Source: AFC

=== Group G ===
Pos	Team	Pld	W	D	L	GF	GA	GD	Pts	Qualification	JEO	URA	BJG	BUR
1	(South Korea) Jeonbuk Hyundai Motors	6	4	1	1	7	3	+4	13	Advance to knockout stage	—	2–1	3–1	0–0
2	(Japan) Urawa Red Diamonds	6	3	1	2	9	4	+5	10	Advance to knockout stage	0–1	—	3–0	3–0
3	(China) Beijing FC	6	2	1	3	6	8	−2	7		0–1	0–0	—	2–0
4	(Thailand) Buriram United	6	1	1	4	3	10	−7	4		1–0	1–2	1–3	—

Source: AFC

=== Group H ===
Pos	Team	Pld	W	D	L	GF	GA	GD	Pts	Qualification	ULS	SSI	KAW	SYD
1	(South Korea) Ulsan Hyundai	6	3	2	1	5	7	−2	11	Advance to knockout stage	—	1–0	1–0	1–0
2	(China) Shanghai SIPG	6	2	3	1	13	8	+5	9	Advance to knockout stage	5–0	—	1–0	2–2
3	(Japan) Kawasaki Frontale	6	2	2	2	9	6	+3	8		2–2	2–2	—	1–0
4	(Australia) Sydney FC	6	0	3	3	5	11	−6	3		0–0	3–3	0–4	—

Source: AFC

== Knockout stage ==
In the knockout stage, the 16 teams played a single-elimination tournament, with the teams split into the two regions until the final. Each tie is played on a home-and-away two-legged basis. The away goals rule, extra time (away goals do not apply in extra time) and penalty shoot-out were used to decide the winner if necessary (Regulations Article 11.3).

=== Bracket ===
The bracket was decided after the draw for the quarter-finals, which was held on 2 July 2019, 16:00 MYT (UTC+8), at the AFC House in Kuala Lumpur, Malaysia.

Round of 16	Quarter-finals
(Saudi Arabia) Al-Nassr	1	3	4
(United Arab Emirates) Al-Wahda	1	2	3
(Saudi Arabia) Al-Nassr	2	1	3
(Qatar) Al-Sadd	1	3	4
(Qatar) Al-Duhail	1	1	2
(Qatar) Al-Sadd	1	3	4
West Region
(Saudi Arabia) Al-Ittihad	2	4	6
(Iran) Zob Ahan	1	3	4
(Saudi Arabia) Al-Ittihad	0	1	1
(Saudi Arabia) Al-Hilal	0	3	3
(Saudi Arabia) Al-Ahli	2	1	3
(Saudi Arabia) Al-Hilal	4	0	4
(China) Shanghai SIPG (p)	1	1	2 (5)
(South Korea) Jeonbuk Hyundai Motors	1	1	2 (3)
(China) Shanghai SIPG	2	1	3
(Japan) Urawa Red Diamonds (a)	2	1	3
(Japan) Urawa Red Diamonds	1	3	4
(South Korea) Ulsan Hyundai	2	0	2
East Region
(China) Guangzhou Evergrande (p)	2	2	4 (6)
(China) Shandong Luneng	1	3	4 (5)
(China) Guangzhou Evergrande (a)	0	1	1
(Japan) Kashima Antlers	0	1	1
(Japan) Kashima Antlers (a)	1	2	3
(Japan) Sanfrecce Hiroshima	0	3	3

Semi-finals
(Qatar) Al-Sadd	1	4	5
(Saudi Arabia) Al-Hilal	4	2	6
(Japan) Urawa Red Diamonds	2	1	3
(China) Guangzhou Evergrande	0	0	0

Final
(Saudi Arabia) Al-Hilal	1	2	3
(Japan) Urawa Red Diamonds	0	0	0

=== Round of 16 ===
In the round of 16, the winners of one group played the runners-up of another group from the same region, with the group winners hosting the second leg, and the matchups determined by the group stage draw.

West Region
Team 1	Agg.	Team 2	1st leg	2nd leg
Al-Nassr (Saudi Arabia)	4–3	(United Arab Emirates) Al-Wahda	1–1	3–2
Al-Ittihad (Saudi Arabia)	6–4	(Iran) Zob Ahan	2–1	4–3
Al-Duhail (Qatar)	2–4	(Qatar) Al-Sadd	1–1	1–3
Al-Ahli (Saudi Arabia)	3–4	(Saudi Arabia) Al-Hilal	2–4	1–0

East Region
Team 1	Agg.	Team 2	1st leg	2nd leg
Kashima Antlers (Japan)	3–3 (a)	(Japan) Sanfrecce Hiroshima	1–0	2–3
Guangzhou Evergrande (China)	4–4 (6–5 p)	(China) Shandong Luneng	2–1	2–3 (a.e.t.)
Urawa Red Diamonds (Japan)	4–2	(South Korea) Ulsan Hyundai	1–2	3–0
Shanghai SIPG (China)	2–2 (5–3 p)	(South Korea) Jeonbuk Hyundai Motors	1–1	1–1 (a.e.t.)

=== Quarter-finals ===
The draw for the quarter-finals was held on 2 July 2019. In the quarter-finals, the four round of 16 winners from the West Region (whose identity was not known at the time of the draw) played in two ties, and the four round of 16 winners from the East Region played in two ties, with the matchups and order of legs decided by draw, without any seeding or country protection.

West Region
Team 1	Agg.	Team 2	1st leg	2nd leg
Al-Nassr (Saudi Arabia)	3–4	(Qatar) Al-Sadd	2–1	1–3
Al-Ittihad (Saudi Arabia)	1–3	(Saudi Arabia) Al-Hilal	0–0	1–3

East Region
Team 1	Agg.	Team 2	1st leg	2nd leg
Shanghai SIPG (China)	3–3 (a)	(Japan) Urawa Red Diamonds	2–2	1–1
Guangzhou Evergrande (China)	1–1 (a)	(Japan) Kashima Antlers	0–0	1–1

=== Semi-finals ===
In the semi-finals, the two quarter-final winners from the West Region played each other, and the two quarter-final winners from the East Region played each other, with the order of legs determined by the quarter-final draw.

West Region
Team 1	Agg.	Team 2	1st leg	2nd leg
Al-Sadd (Qatar)	5–6	(Saudi Arabia) Al-Hilal	1–4	4–2

East Region
Team 1	Agg.	Team 2	1st leg	2nd leg
Urawa Red Diamonds (Japan)	3–0	(China) Guangzhou Evergrande	2–0	1–0

=== Final ===
In the final, the two semi-final winners played each other, with the order of legs (first leg hosted by team from the West Region, second leg hosted by team from the East Region) reversed from the previous season's final.

9 November 2019
19:30 UTC+3

Al-Hilal (Saudi Arabia)	1–0	(Japan) Urawa Red Diamonds
Carrillo 60'	Live Report; Stats Report

King Saud University Stadium, Riyadh
Attendance: 22,549
Referee: Ali Sabah (Iraq)
24 November 2019
19:01 UTC+9

Urawa Red Diamonds (Japan)	0–2	(Saudi Arabia) Al-Hilal
	Live Report; Stats Report	Al-Dawsari 74'; Gomis 90+3'

Saitama Stadium 2002, Saitama
Attendance: 58,109
Referee: Valentin Kovalenko (Uzbekistan)

Al-Hilal won 3–0 on aggregate.

== Awards ==
=== Main awards ===
Award	Player	Team
Most Valuable Player	(France) Bafétimbi Gomis	(Saudi Arabia) Al-Hilal
Top Goalscorer	(France) Bafétimbi Gomis	(Saudi Arabia) Al-Hilal
Fair Play Award	—	(Japan) Urawa Red Diamonds
Best Goal	(Iran) Shojae Khalilzadeh	(Iran) Persepolis

=== All-Star Squad ===
Position	Player	Team
Goalkeeper	(Japan) Shusaku Nishikawa	(Japan) Urawa Red Diamonds
Goalkeeper	(Saudi Arabia) Abdullah Al-Mayouf	(Saudi Arabia) Al-Hilal
Defenders	(Japan) Takahiro Sekine	(Japan) Urawa Red Diamonds
Defenders	(Japan) Tomoaki Makino	(Japan) Urawa Red Diamonds
Defenders	(Saudi Arabia) Mohammed Al-Breik	(Saudi Arabia) Al-Hilal
Defenders	(South Korea) Park Ji-soo	(China) Guangzhou Evergrande
Defenders	(Japan) Daisuke Suzuki	(Japan) Urawa Red Diamonds
Midfielders	(Qatar) Akram Afif	(Qatar) Al-Sadd
Midfielders	(Brazil) Léo Silva	(Japan) Kashima Antlers
Midfielders	(Brazil) Talisca	(China) Guangzhou Evergrande
Midfielders	(Brazil) Oscar	(China) Shanghai SIPG
Midfielders	(South Korea) Nam Tae-hee	(Qatar) Al-Duhail
Midfielders	(Saudi Arabia) Salman Al-Faraj	(Saudi Arabia) Al-Hilal
Midfielders	(Italy) Sebastian Giovinco	(Saudi Arabia) Al-Hilal
Midfielders	(Spain) Gabi	(Qatar) Al-Sadd
Midfielders	(Brazil) Paulinho	(China) Guangzhou Evergrande
Forwards	(Brazil) Romarinho	(Saudi Arabia) Al-Ittihad
Forwards	(Japan) Shinzo Koroki	(Japan) Urawa Red Diamonds
Forwards	(Brazil) Hulk	(China) Shanghai SIPG
Forwards	(Peru) André Carrillo	(Saudi Arabia) Al-Hilal
Forwards	(Brazil) Giuliano de Paula	(Saudi Arabia) Al-Nassr
Forwards	(France) Bafétimbi Gomis	(Saudi Arabia) Al-Hilal
Forwards	(Saudi Arabia) Salem Al-Dawsari	(Saudi Arabia) Al-Hilal

=== Opta Best XI ===
Position	Player	Team
Goalkeeper	(Japan) Shusaku Nishikawa	(Japan) Urawa Red Diamonds
Defenders	(Saudi Arabia) Yasser Al-Shahrani	(Saudi Arabia) Al-Hilal
Defenders	(South Korea) Park Ji-soo	(China) Guangzhou Evergrande
Defenders	(Saudi Arabia) Ali Al-Bulaihi	(Saudi Arabia) Al-Hilal
Defenders	(Japan) Daiki Hashioka	(Japan) Urawa Red Diamonds
Midfielders	(Brazil) Oscar	(China) Shanghai SIPG
Midfielders	(Brazil) Giuliano	(Saudi Arabia) Al-Nassr
Midfielders	(Brazil) Leonardo	(United Arab Emirates) Al-Wahda
Forwards	(Japan) Shinzo Koroki	(Japan) Urawa Red Diamonds
Forwards	(France) Bafétimbi Gomis	(Saudi Arabia) Al-Hilal
Forwards	(Syria) Omar Al Somah	(Saudi Arabia) Al-Ahli

=== Fans' Best XI ===
Position	Player	Team
Goalkeeper	(Saudi Arabia) Abdullah Al-Mayouf	(Saudi Arabia) Al-Hilal
Defenders	(Saudi Arabia) Yasser Al-Shahrani	(Saudi Arabia) Al-Hilal
Defenders	(Qatar) Tarek Salman	(Qatar) Al-Sadd
Defenders	(Saudi Arabia) Ali Al-Bulaihi	(Saudi Arabia) Al-Hilal
Defenders	(United Arab Emirates) Mohammed Barqesh	(United Arab Emirates) Al-Wahda
Midfielders	(Saudi Arabia) Salem Al-Dawsari	(Saudi Arabia) Al-Hilal
Midfielders	(Brazil) Giuliano	(Saudi Arabia) Al-Nassr
Midfielders	(Brazil) Leonardo	(United Arab Emirates) Al-Wahda
Forwards	(Italy) Sebastian Giovinco	(Saudi Arabia) Al-Hilal
Forwards	(France) Bafétimbi Gomis	(Saudi Arabia) Al-Hilal
Forwards	(Syria) Omar Al Somah	(Saudi Arabia) Al-Ahli

== Top scorers ==
Team eliminated / inactive for this round.
Player was not in the team but team still active for this round.

Rank	Player	Team	MD1	MD2	MD3	MD4	MD5	MD6	2R1	2R2	QF1	QF2	SF1	SF2	F1	F2	Total
1	(France) Bafétimbi Gomis	(Saudi Arabia) Al-Hilal		1	1			2	3				2	1		1	11
2	(Brazil) Leonardo	(United Arab Emirates) Al-Wahda		2	1	4	1		1								9
3	(Japan) Shinzo Koroki	(Japan) Urawa Red Diamonds				1	1	1		2	1	1		1			8
4	(Ba'athist Syria) Omar Al Somah	(Saudi Arabia) Al-Ahli	2			2	1	1	1								7
5	(Iraq) Alaa Abbas	(Iraq) Al-Zawraa		2		1	1	2									6
5	(Brazil) Giuliano	(Saudi Arabia) Al-Nassr		1	1		1			2	1						6
5	(Brazil) Hulk	(China) Shanghai SIPG	1				2			1	2						6
5	(Italy) Graziano Pellè	(China) Shandong Luneng	2	2	1	1											6
9	(Uzbekistan) Temurkhuja Abdukholiqov	(Uzbekistan) Lokomotiv Tashkent	1			1	1	2									5
9	(Qatar) Akram Afif	(Qatar) Al-Sadd					1		1	1	1			1			5
9	(Brazil) Romarinho	(Saudi Arabia) Al-Ittihad				1	1	1		2							5
9	(Brazil) Talisca	(China) Guangzhou Evergrande	1	1	2							1					5

Note: Goals scored in the qualifying play-offs are not counted when determining top scorer (Regulations Article 64.4).

Source: AFC

== Player of the week awards ==
Matchday	Toyota Player of the Week		
Matchday	Player	Team	Ref.
Group stage
Matchday 1	(Brazil) Cesinha	(South Korea) Daegu FC	
Matchday 2	(Iraq) Alaa Abbas	(Iraq) Al-Zawraa	
Matchday 3	(Brazil) Talisca	(China) Guangzhou Evergrande	
Matchday 4	(Brazil) Leonardo	(United Arab Emirates) Al-Wahda	
Matchday 5	(Brazil) Hulk	(China) Shanghai SIPG	
Matchday 6	(Japan) Yasuto Wakizaka	(Japan) Kawasaki Frontale	
Knockout stage
Round of 16 1st leg – East	(Japan) Kenyu Sugimoto	(Japan) Urawa Red Diamonds	
Round of 16 2nd leg – East	(Japan) Shoma Doi	(Japan) Kashima Antlers	
Round of 16 1st leg – West	(France) Bafétimbi Gomis	(Saudi Arabia) Al-Hilal	
Round of 16 2nd leg – West	(Brazil) Romarinho	(Saudi Arabia) Al-Ittihad	
Quarter-finals 1st leg	(Brazil) Giuliano	(Saudi Arabia) Al-Nassr	
Quarter-finals 2nd leg	(Saudi Arabia) Salem Al-Dawsari	(Saudi Arabia) Al-Hilal	
Semi-finals 1st leg	(France) Bafétimbi Gomis	(Saudi Arabia) Al-Hilal	
Semi-finals 2nd leg	(Japan) Shusaku Nishikawa	(Japan) Urawa Red Diamonds	
Final 1st leg	(Saudi Arabia) Mohammed Al-Breik	(Saudi Arabia) Al-Hilal	
Final 2nd leg	(Saudi Arabia) Salem Al-Dawsari	(Saudi Arabia) Al-Hilal	

== See also ==
- 2019 AFC Cup
- 2019 AFC Women's Club Championship
