= Ciprian Panait =

Romanian football manager (born 1976)

Personal information
- Full name: Marius Ciprian Panait
- Date of birth: 22 November 1976 (age 49)
- Place of birth: Ceptura, Romania

Youth career
- Years: Team
- Petrolul Ploiești

Managerial career
- 2001–2006: FCM Bacău (fitness coach)
- 2006–2007: Al Ain (fitness coach)
- 2007: Rapid București U18
- 2007–2008: Ceahlăul Piatra Neamț (fitness coach)
- 2008–2010: Rapid București (fitness coach)
- 2010: Rapid București (caretaker)
- 2011: Politehnica Timișoara (fitness coach)
- 2011–2012: Rapid București (technical director)
- 2012: Vaslui (fitness coach)
- 2012–2013: Ceahlăul Piatra Neamț (fitness coach)
- 2013: CSMS Iași (fitness coach)
- 2014–2016: Al Hilal U23
- 2015: Al Hilal (caretaker)
- 2016: Al Hilal (caretaker)
- 2017–2018: Al Raed
- 2018–2019: Al Batin
- 2019: Sohar
- 2021–2022: Al Kharaitiyat
- 2025: Petrolul Ploiești
- 2025–2026: Dibba

Marius Ciprian Panait (born 22 November 1976) is a Romanian professional football manager.
