= Ali Al-Sqoor =

Saudi Arabian footballer

Personal information
- Full name: Ali Zubarah Al-Sqoor
- Date of birth: November 24, 1986 (age 39)
- Place of birth: Saudi Arabia
- Position: Defender

Senior career*
Years	Team	Apps	(Gls)
2007–2010	Najran	34	(0)
2010–2011	Al-Ahli	0	(0)
2011	→ Al-Taawon (loan)	1	(0)
2013–2015	Al Jabalain		
2015–2016	Al-Mujazzel		
2016–2018	Najran		
2021–2022	Hubuna		
- * Club domestic league appearances and goals

Ali Al-Sqoor (born 24 November 1986) is a Saudi football player who plays as a defender.
