= Sadio Demba =

Senegalese football manager (born 1965)

Personal information
- Date of birth: 2 December 1965 (age 60)
- Place of birth: Senegal

Managerial career
- Years: Team
- 2016: White Star
- 2016: Antwerp
- 2017: Tubize-Braine
- 2018: Ohod Club
- 2018–2019: Al-Orobah

Sadio Demba (born 2 December 1965) is a Senegalese former football manager.

== Career ==
In 2014, Demba became the first Senegalese to earn the UEFA Pro License. In 2016, he was appointed manager of Belgian third tier side White Star. In 2017, he was appointed manager of Tubize-Braine in the Belgian second tier. In 2018, Demba was appointed manager of Saudi Arabian top flight club Ohod Club. In 2018, he was appointed manager of Al-Orobah in the Saudi Arabian second tier.
