= Jonatas Belusso =

Brazilian footballer

Personal information
- Full name: Jonatas Elias Belusso
- Date of birth: 10 June 1988 (age 38)
- Place of birth: Francisco Beltrão, Brazil
- Height: 1.76 m (5 ft 9 in)
- Position: Striker

Team information
- Current team: Juventus-SC

Senior career*
Years	Team	Apps	(Gls)
2007–2008	Toledo		
2008–2009	Francisco Beltrão		
2009	Örebro Syrianska		
2009–2010	XV de Indaial		
2010	Brusque	1	(0)
2011	Metropolitano	24	(14)
2011–2013	Guaratinguetá	46	(16)
2012	→ Juventude (loan)	22	(7)
2013	→ Náutico (loan)	6	(0)
2014	Novo Hamburgo	14	(4)
2014	Treze	13	(5)
2014	Ermis Aradippou	7	(0)
2015	Gangwon FC	31	(15)
2016	Seoul E-Land	17	(4)
2016	Brasil de Pelotas	10	(0)
2017	Brusque	17	(11)
2017	Londrina	17	(11)
2017–2018	Al Shabab	5	(1)
2018	Vitória	0	(0)
2018	→ Coritiba (loan)	9	(0)
2019–2020	América Mineiro	26	(3)
2020	→ Juventude (loan)	4	(0)
2021	Londrina	5	(0)
2022–	Juventus-SC	7	(1)
- * Club domestic league appearances and goals as of 16 February 2022

Jonatas Elias Belusso (born 10 June 1988) is a Brazilian footballer who plays as a striker for Juventus-SC. Belusso also carries Syrian passport.

== Career ==
He joined K League Challenge side Gangwon FC in February 2015 and was released at the end of the season. In February 2016 it was announced that Belusso joined K League Challenge side Seoul E-Land FC.
