= Yahya Al-Musalem =

Saudi Arabian footballer

Personal information
- Full name: Yahya Al-Musalem
- Date of birth: January 7, 1987 (age 39)
- Place of birth: Saudi Arabia
- Height: 1.87 m (6 ft 2 in)
- Position: Defender

Senior career*
Years	Team	Apps	(Gls)
2007–2012	Al-Raed	36	(4)
2012–2016	Al-Hilal	10	(0)
2016–2017	Al-Wehda	16	(2)
2017–2019	Al-Raed	12	(2)

International career^{‡}
2012–	Saudi Arabia	2	(0)
- * Club domestic league appearances and goals as of 30 January 2018 ‡ National team caps and goals as of 20:31, 22 December 2017 (UTC)

Yahya Al-Musalem (born 7 January 1987) is a Saudi Arabian footballer who plays as a defender.
