= Yousef Khamees =

Saudi footballer

Personal information
- Full name: Yousef Khamis Al–Sawasan
- Date of birth: April 1, 1990 (age 36)
- Place of birth: Jizan, Saudi Arabia
- Position: Left back

Team information
- Current team: Al-Houra
- Number: 14

Youth career
- –2011: Al-Nassr

Senior career*
Years	Team	Apps	(Gls)
2011–2015	Al-Nassr	3	(0)
2013–2014	→ Najran (loan)	7	(0)
2014–2015	→ Al-Khaleej (loan)	23	(0)
2015–2017	Al-Fateh	11	(0)
2017	Al-Batin	0	(0)
2018–2019	Al-Khaleej	21	(1)
2019	Al-Orobah	8	(0)
2019–2020	Al-Ansar	22	(0)
2020–2021	Al Safa		
2021–2022	Al-Kawkab	21	(0)
2022–2025	Al-Sahel		
2025–	Al-Houra		
- * Club domestic league appearances and goals

Yousef Khamis (Arabic: يوسف خميس; born 1 April 1990) is a Saudi Arabian footballer who plays as a left back for Al-Houra.

== Career ==
Khamis started his career at Al-Nassr. He made his first-team debut on 31 March 2012 in the league match against Al-Taawoun. On 11 September 2013, Khamis joined Najran on loan. On 6 June 2014, Khamis joined Al-Khaleej on loan. On 1 June 2015, Khamis joined Al-Fateh on a three-year deal. On 20 June 2017, Khamis joined Al-Batin. On 23 November 2017, Khamis left Al-Batin without making a single appearance and joined Al-Khaleej. On 1 February 2019, Khamis joined Al-Orobah on a six-month deal. On 26 July 2019, Khamis joined Al-Ansar. On 17 October 2020, he joined Second Division side Al Safa. On 17 August 2021, Khamis joined Al-Kawkab. On 9 June 2022, Khamis joined Al-Sahel.
