= Ousmane Diabaté (footballer, born 1994) =

Nigerien footballer

Personal information
- Full name: Ousmane Diabaté
- Date of birth: July 9, 1994 (age 32)
- Place of birth: Niamey, Niger
- Height: 1.83 m (6 ft 0 in)
- Position: Midfielder

Senior career*
Years	Team	Apps	(Gls)
2011–2012	AS Police		
2012–2016	Stade Malien		
2016–2017	Séwé FC		
2017	ENPPI	5	(0)
2017–2018	Al-Batin	8	(0)
2018–2019	Jeddah	33	(4)
2019–2020	Al-Taqadom		
2020–2021	Naft Maysan		
2021–2022	Muaither		
2022–2023	Al-Minaa		
2023–2024	Najran		
2024–2025	Al-Sadaqa		

International career^{‡}
2018–	Niger	44	(0)
- * Club domestic league appearances and goals as of 18 November 2019 ‡ National team caps and goals as of 9 July 2026

Ousmane Diabaté (born 9 July 1994) is a Nigerien professional footballer who plays as a midfielder for the Niger national football team.

== Club career ==
On 23 January 2022, Diabaté joined Iraqi club Al-Minaa from Qatari club Muaither.

== International career ==
Diabaté made his professional debut for the Niger national football team in a friendly 3–3 tie with the Central African Republic on 27 May 2018.

== Career statistics ==
=== International ===
As of match played on 15 October 2024

Appearances and goals by national team and year
National team	Year	Apps	Goals
Niger	2018	5	0
Niger	2019	5	0
Niger	2020	4	0
Niger	2021	11	0
Niger	2022	8	0
Niger	2023	7	0
Niger	2024	4	0
Total		44	0
