= Valdo Alhinho =

Angolan footballer

Personal information
- Full name: Valdo Gonçalves Alhinho
- Date of birth: 17 December 1988 (age 37)
- Place of birth: Benguela, Angola
- Height: 1.85 m (6 ft 1 in)
- Position: Midfielder

Team information
- Current team: FC Swan

Youth career
- 1998–2006: Vialonga
- 2006–2007: Atlético CP

Senior career*
Years	Team	Apps	(Gls)
2007–2008	Sacavenense		
2009–2010	Murça SC		
2010	Sliema Wanderers	3	(0)
2010–2011	Msida		
2011–2012	St. Andrews		
2012–2013	Floriana	13	(1)
2013–2014	Recreativo Caála	4	(0)
2014–2016	Oriental	64	(2)
2016–2017	Valletta	16	(0)
2017	Jelgava	0	(0)
2017	Al Batin	11	(0)
2018	Fafe	6	(0)
2019	Alverca	12	(0)
2019–2020	Hamrun Spartans	9	(1)
2020–2021	Lija Athletic	13	(0)
2021–2023	Marsa	44	(2)
2025–	FC Swan		
- * Club domestic league appearances and goals as of 23 April 2023

Valdo Gonçalves Alhinho (born 17 December 1988) is an Angolan professional footballer who plays for Maltese amateur side FC Swan mainly as a midfielder.

== Club career ==
Born in Benguela, Alhinho made his debut with Sacavenense in 2007 of the fifth tier, moving to Murça in the same tier in following year. After failing to make an impact he signed for Maltese club Sliema Wanderers in 2010.

After making 3 appearances, he joined Msida of the second tier, and after a short stint with St. Andrews, he returned to top tier with Floriana in 2012. The following year he played for Recreativo Caála of his country.

Alhinho signed for Segunda Liga newly promoted club Oriental at the beginning of the 2014–15 season for a two-year contract.
