= Dionatan Machado =

Brazilian footballer (born 1992)

Personal information
- Full name: Dionatan Machado de Oliveira
- Date of birth: 22 December 1992 (age 33)
- Place of birth: Cachoeira, Brazil
- Height: 1.78 m (5 ft 10 in)
- Position: Attacking midfielder

Team information
- Current team: Avenida
- Number: 10

Youth career
- 2010–2013: Santos

Senior career*
Years	Team	Apps	(Gls)
2009–2010	Caxias	0	(0)
2013	Cianorte	4	(1)
2013	Caldense	2	(0)
2013–2014	Legião	1	(0)
2014	Santa Rita	0	(0)
2015	Grêmio Barueri	17	(1)
2015–2016	Central	3	(0)
2016	Pelotas	5	(0)
2016–2018	Caxias	0	(0)
2017	→ Universitario de Sucre (loan)	27	(11)
2018	Al-Batin	7	(0)
2018–2019	Saham	0	(0)
2019–2021	Al-Dhaid	2	(0)
2021	Masfout	0	(0)
2021–2022	Persik Kediri	26	(1)
2022	Hong Linh Ha Tinh	14	(1)
2023	Avenida	8	(0)
2024	Brasil de Pelotas	11	(0)
2024-Present	Aguila	11	(0)
- * Club domestic league appearances and goals as of 30 August 2024

Dionatan Machado de Oliveira (born 22 December 1992), commonly known as Tinga, is a Brazilian professional footballer who plays as an attacking midfielder for Salvadoran club Aguila.

== Career ==
He formerly played for Santos, Caxias, Cianorte, Caldense, Legião, Guaratinguetá, Santa Rita, Grêmio Barueri, Pelotas, Central, Universitario de Sucre, Al-Batin, Saham, Al-Dhaid, and Masfout

=== Persik Kediri ===
On 5 July 2021, Tinga signed one-year contract with Persik Kediri from the Indonesian Liga 1. He made his league debut for Persik Kediri on 3 October, in the sixth week when Persik faced PSS Sleman, Sunday. He was finally able to experience Indonesian football competition, he came on in the 50th minute to replace Krisna Bayu Otto, but, until the end of the match Persik had to draw 0–0 with PSS Sleman. On 21 October, Tinga provided a three assist in a 4–2 league win against Persipura Jayapura as well as being the man of the match. On 30 October, Tinga scored his first goal for the team, scoring in a 2–2 draw over Persija Jakarta at the Manahan Stadium.

In July 2022, he signed a contract with Vietnamese club Hong Linh Ha Tinh.
