= Mohanna Waqes =

Saudi Arabian footballer (born 1983)

Personal information
- Full name: Mohanna Waqes Al-Enezi
- Date of birth: 18 November 1983 (age 42)
- Place of birth: Hafar al-Batin, Saudi Arabia
- Height: 1.62 m (5 ft 4 in)
- Positions: Right-back; right winger

Team information
- Current team: Al-Qaisumah
- Number: 13

Youth career
- Al-Batin

Senior career*
Years	Team	Apps	(Gls)
2004–2020	Al-Batin		
2020–2021	Al-Tai	22	(0)
2021–	Al-Qaisumah		
- * Club domestic league appearances and goals

Mohanna Waqes Al-Enezi (Arabic: مهنا واقص العنزي; born 18 November 1983) is a Saudi professional footballer who plays as a right back for Al-Qaisumah.

== Honours ==
Al-Batin

- MS League: 2019–20
