= Jhonnattann =

Brazilian footballer

Personal information
- Full name: Jhonnattann Benites da Conceiçao
- Date of birth: 27 July 1989 (age 37)
- Place of birth: Cardoso Moreira, Brazil
- Position: Attacking midfielder

Team information
- Current team: Valletta
- Number: 77

Senior career*
Years	Team	Apps	(Gls)
2011–2012	Volta Redonda	21	(11)
2012–2014	Birkirkara	59	(35)
2014–2015	Al-Muharraq	16	(7)
2015–2017	Valletta	41	(14)
2017	→ Al-Batin (loan)	6	(2)
2017–2018	Al-Batin	36	(16)
2018–2019	Al-Taawoun	7	(0)
2019	→ Al-Batin (loan)	14	(6)
2019–2020	Fujairah	16	(1)
2020–2021	Al-Muharraq		
2021–2022	Al-Sahel	31	(12)
2022–2023	Al-Kholood	13	(3)
2023	Najran	8	(1)
2023–	Valletta	19	(1)
- * Club domestic league appearances and goals as of 13 May 2024

Jhonnattann Benites da Conceiçao (born 27 July 1989) is a Brazilian footballer who plays as an attacking midfielder for Valletta.
