= Luisinho (footballer, born 1991) =

Brazilian footballer

Personal information
- Full name: Luis Gustavo Melere da Silva
- Date of birth: 10 March 1991 (age 35)
- Place of birth: Rio de Janeiro, Brazil
- Height: 1.75 m (5 ft 9 in)
- Position: Winger

Team information
- Current team: Botafogo-PB

Senior career*
Years	Team	Apps	(Gls)
2011–2014	Paraná	66	(8)
2014	Bragantino	23	(4)
2015	Atlético Goianiense	10	(1)
2015	Santa Cruz	29	(7)
2016–2017	Bahia	35	(6)
2016–2017	→ Al-Faisaly (loan)	21	(9)
2017–2020	Al-Faisaly	61	(18)
2020–2022	Al-Wehda	36	(9)
2023–	Retrô	21	(5)
2023–	→ Botafogo-PB (loan)	4	(1)
- * Club domestic league appearances and goals as of 7 October 2023

Luis Gustavo Melere da Silva (born 10 March 1991), known as Luisinho, is a Brazilian footballer who plays for Botafogo-PB on loan from Retrô as a winger.
