= Jou Silva =

Brazilian footballer (born 1987)

Personal information
- Full name: Jorge Santos Silva
- Date of birth: 23 April 1987 (age 39)
- Place of birth: Salvador, Bahia, Brazil
- Height: 1.80 m (5 ft 11 in)
- Positions: Striker; left winger

Team information
- Current team: Nadur Youngsters

Youth career
- Grêmio

Senior career*
Years	Team	Apps	(Gls)
2008	Daegu	2	(0)
2009	Rio Claro		
2009–2010	Metropolitano		
2010	Chapadão		
2010–2011	Vittoriosa Stars	24	(7)
2011–2012	Sliema Wanderers	15	(3)
2012	Birkirkara	14	(7)
2012	Atlético Paranaense	0	(0)
2013	América-RN	0	(0)
2013–2015	Tarxien Rainbows	44	(10)
2015	Naxxar Lions	15	(5)
2015–2016	Hibernians	26	(13)
2016–2017	Al-Batin	30	(15)
2018	Al-Batin	9	(8)
2018–2019	Johor Darul Ta'zim	4	(1)
2018	→ Al-Fujairah (loan)	1	(0)
2019	Al-Qadsiah	11	(1)
2019–2020	Al-Tai	17	(0)
2020	Hibernians	5	(0)
2020–	Nadur Youngsters		
- * Club domestic league appearances and goals as of 12:40, 27 November 2020 (UTC)

Jorge Santos Silva, usually known as Jorge or Jou Silva (born 23 April 1987, in Brazil), is a Brazilian football player who plays as a forward for Nadur Youngsters.

He played for Grêmio as a youth. He played for South Korean club Daegu and Rio Claro prior to joining Maltese club Vittoriosa Stars.

On 4 May 2018, he signed a Contract with Malaysian club Johor Darul Ta'zim.
