= Pitty (footballer) =

Brazilian footballer

Personal information
- Full name: Luiz Paulo Daniel Barbosa
- Date of birth: 29 November 1987 (age 38)
- Place of birth: São José dos Campos, Brazil
- Height: 1.84 m (6 ft 0 in)
- Position: Center back

Senior career*
Years	Team	Apps	(Gls)
2008–2011	Camisa	?	(?)
2011	Taubaté	18	(2)
2011–2012	Anápolis	?	(?)
2012–2013	Monte Azul	26	(1)
2012	→ Vila Nova (loan)	1	(0)
2013–2014	Treze	10	(0)
2014	Novembro	12	(0)
2014–2015	Treze	14	(0)
2015	Rio Claro	13	(0)
2015–2016	Guarani	12	(0)
2016	São Bento	15	(0)
2016–2017	Paraná	26	(0)
2017	São Bento	11	(1)
2017	Cuiabá	5	(0)
2017–2018	Al-Batin	24	(3)
2018–2020	Al-Tai	59	(2)
2020	Al-Jabalain	13	(1)
2020–2022	Al-Shoulla		
- * Club domestic league appearances and goals as of 24 June 2020 (UTC)

Luiz Paulo Daniel Barbosa (born 29 November 1987), commonly known as Pitty, is a Brazilian footballer who plays as a center back.

== Career ==
He formerly played for Camisa, Taubaté, Anápolis, Monte Azul, Vila Nova, Treze, Novembro, Rio Claro, Guarani, São Bento, Paraná, Cuiabá, Al-Batin, Al-Tai, Al-Jabalain, and Al-Shoulla.
