= Outline of Saudi Arabia =

Country in West Asia

The Flag of Saudi Arabia

The Emblem of Saudi Arabia

The location of Saudi Arabia

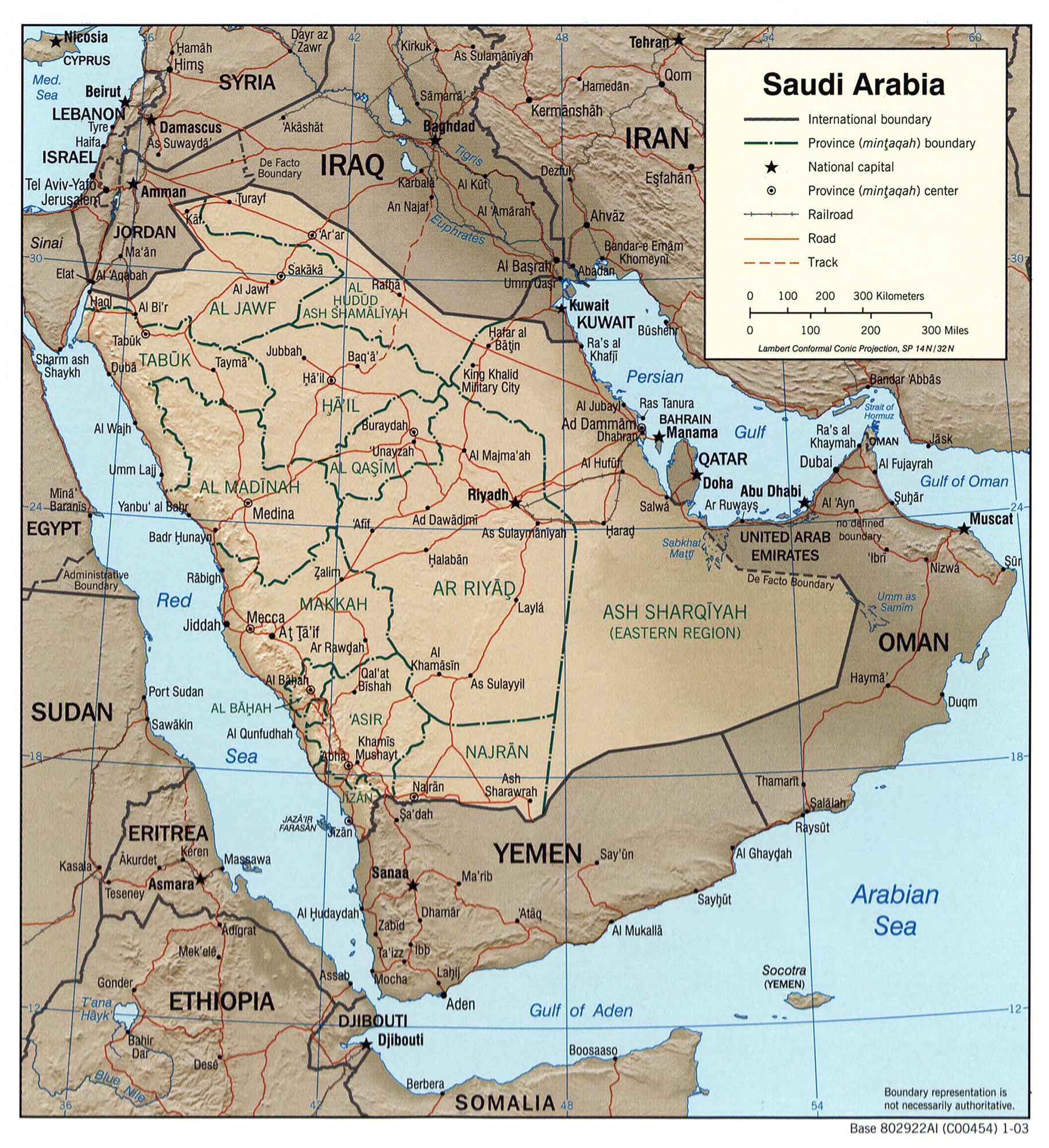
An enlargeable relief map of Saudi Arabia

The following outline is provided as an overview of and topical guide to Saudi Arabia:

Saudi Arabia is a sovereign country that comprises the central portion of the Arabian Peninsula of West Asia. It is bordered by Jordan on the northwest, Iraq on the north and northeast, Kuwait, Qatar, and the United Arab Emirates on the east, Oman on the southeast, and Yemen on the south. The Persian Gulf lies to the northeast and the Red Sea to its west. It has an estimated population of 34,218,169, and its size is approximately 2,150,000 square km (830,000 square miles).

The Kingdom is sometimes called "The Land of The Two Holy Mosques" in reference to Mecca and Medina, the two holiest places of Islam. The Kingdom was founded by Abdul-Aziz bin Saud, whose efforts began in 1902 when he captured the Al-Saud's ancestral home of Riyadh, and culminated in 1932 with the proclamation, and recognition of the Kingdom of Saudi Arabia.

Saudi Arabia is the world's leading petroleum exporter and petroleum exports fuel the Saudi economy. Oil accounts for more than 90 percent of exports and nearly 75 percent of government revenues, facilitating the creation of a welfare state, which the government has found difficult to fund during periods of low oil prices. Human rights groups such as Amnesty International and Human Rights Watch have repeatedly expressed concern about the state of human rights in Saudi Arabia, although these concerns have been dismissed by the Saudi government.

== General reference ==
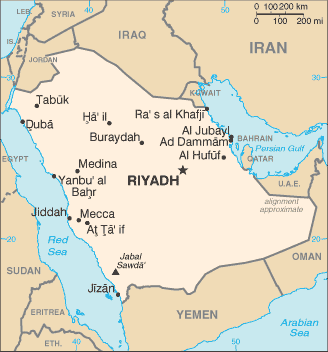
An enlargeable basic map of Saudi Arabia

- Pronunciation: /ˌsɔːdi əˈreɪbiə/
- Common English country name: Saudi Arabia
- Official English country name: The Kingdom of Saudi Arabia
- Adjectives: Saudi, Saudi Arabian
- Demonym(s): Saudi
- Etymology: Name of Saudi Arabia
- International rankings of Saudi Arabia
- ISO country codes: SA, SAU, 682
- ISO region codes: See ISO 3166-2:SA
- Internet country code top-level domain: .sa

== Geography of Saudi Arabia ==
Geography of Saudi Arabia

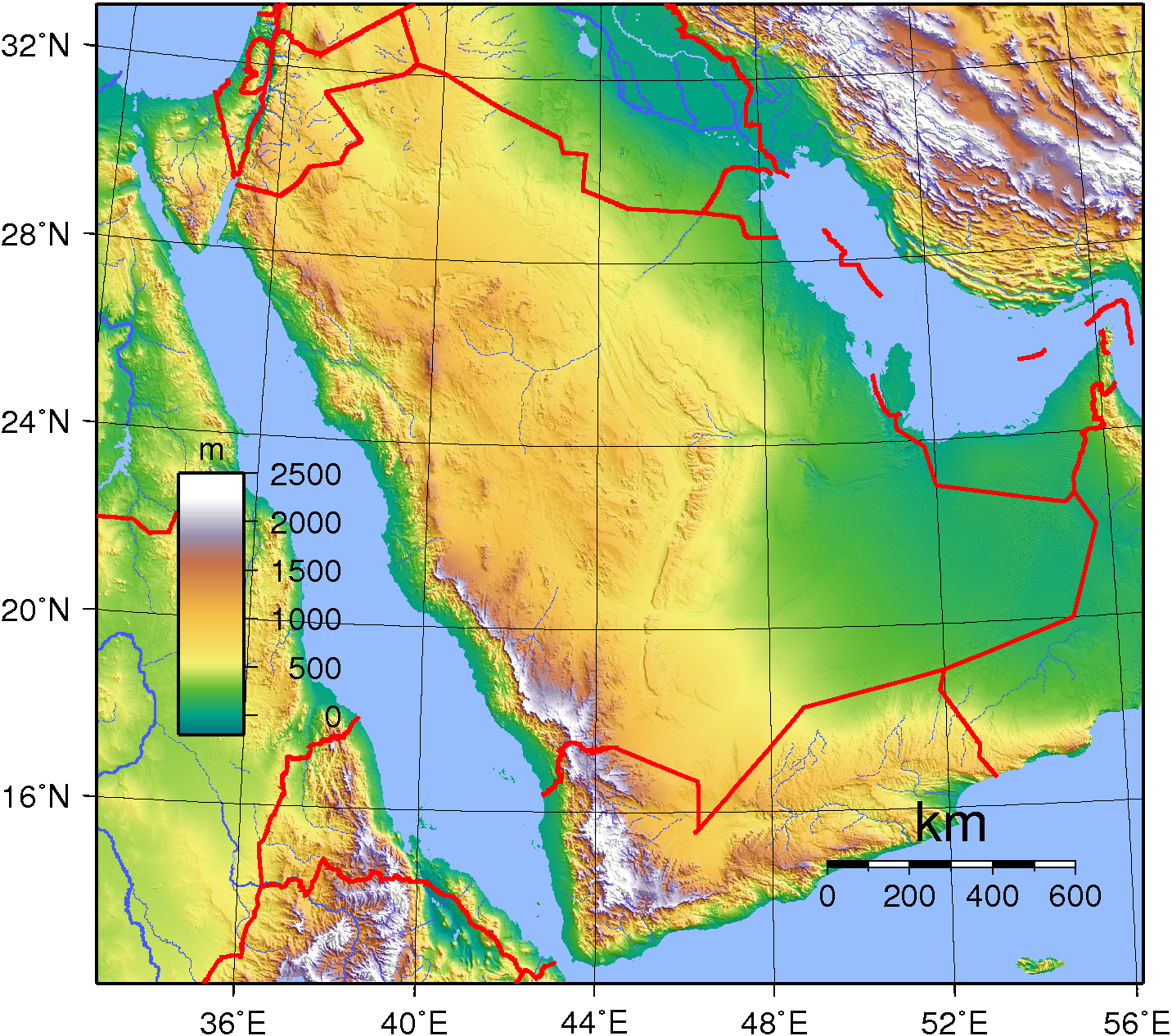
An enlargeable topographic map of Saudi Arabia

- Saudi Arabia is: a country
- Location:
  - Northern Hemisphere and Eastern Hemisphere
  - Eurasia
    - Asia
      - Southwest Asia
  - Middle East
    - Arabian Peninsula
  - Time zone: Saudi Arabia Standard Time (UTC+03)
  - Extreme points of Saudi Arabia
    - High: Jabal Sawda 3,133 m (10,279 ft)
    - Low: Persian Gulf and Red Sea 0 m
  - Land boundaries: 4,431 km

Yemen 1,458 km
Iraq 814 km
Jordan 744 km
Oman 676 km
United Arab Emirates 457 km
Kuwait 222 km
Qatar 60 km

- Coastline: 2,640 km

- Population of Saudi Arabia: 34,218,169 - 46th most populous country
- Area of Saudi Arabia: 2,149,690 km^{2}
- Atlas of Saudi Arabia

=== Environment of Saudi Arabia ===
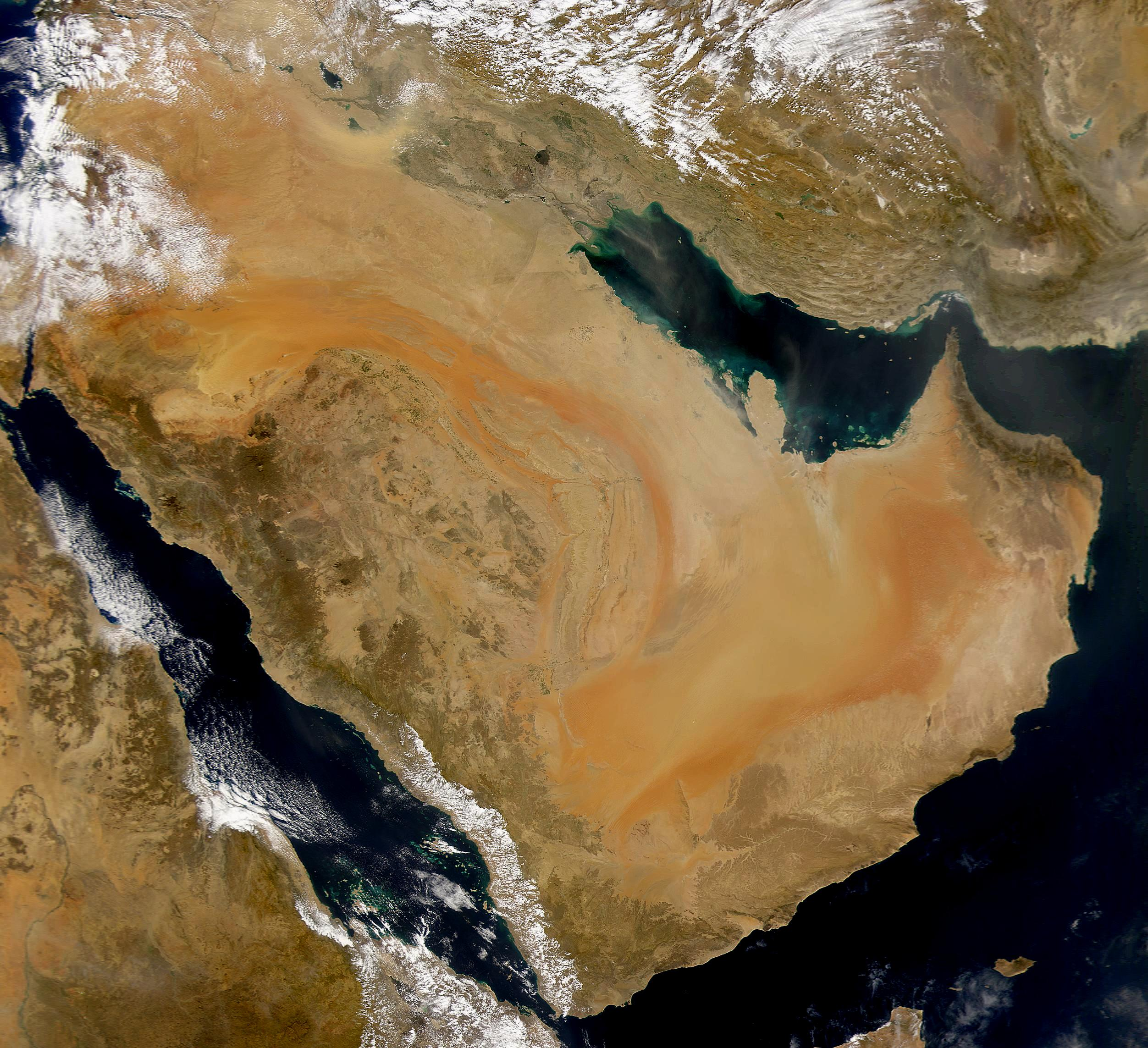
An enlargeable satellite image of Saudi Arabia

Environment of Saudi Arabia

- Climate of Saudi Arabia
- Renewable energy in Saudi Arabia
- Geology of Saudi Arabia
- Protected areas of Saudi Arabia
  - Biosphere reserves in Saudi Arabia
  - National parks of Saudi Arabia
- Wildlife of Saudi Arabia
  - Fauna of Saudi Arabia
    - Birds of Saudi Arabia
    - Mammals of Saudi Arabia
- Saudi Environmental Society

==== Natural geographic features of Saudi Arabia ====
- Glaciers of Saudi Arabia
- Islands of Saudi Arabia
- Lakes of Saudi Arabia
- Mountains of Saudi Arabia
  - Volcanoes in Saudi Arabia
- Rivers of Saudi Arabia
  - Waterfalls of Saudi Arabia
- Valleys of Saudi Arabia
- World Heritage Sites in Saudi Arabia
  - Al-Ahsa Oasis
  - Al-Hijr Archaeological Site (Madâin Sâlih)
  - At-Turaif District in ad-Dir'iyah
  - Historic Jeddah
  - Rock Art in the Hail Region

=== Regions of Saudi Arabia ===
Regions of Saudi Arabia

==== Ecoregions of Saudi Arabia ====
List of ecoregions in Saudi Arabia

==== Administrative divisions of Saudi Arabia ====
Administrative divisions of Saudi Arabia

- Emirates of Saudi Arabia
  - Governorates of Saudi Arabia
    - Municipalities of Saudi Arabia

===== Emirates of Saudi Arabia =====
Emirates of Saudi Arabia

===== Governorates of Saudi Arabia =====
Governorates of Saudi Arabia

===== Municipalities of Saudi Arabia =====
Municipalities of Saudi Arabia

- Capital of Saudi Arabia: Riyadh

=== Demography of Saudi Arabia ===
Demographics of Saudi Arabia

== Government and politics of Saudi Arabia ==
Politics of Saudi Arabia

- Form of government:
- Capital of Saudi Arabia: Riyadh
- Elections in Saudi Arabia
- Political parties in Saudi Arabia

=== Branches of the government of Saudi Arabia ===
==== Executive branch of the government of Saudi Arabia ====
- Head of state: King of Saudi Arabia
- Head of government: Prime Minister of Saudi Arabia
- Cabinet of Saudi Arabia

==== Legislative branch of the government of Saudi Arabia ====
- Consultative Assembly of Saudi Arabia

==== Judicial branch of the government of Saudi Arabia ====
Judiciary of Saudi Arabia

- Supreme Judicial Council of Saudi Arabia

=== Foreign relations of Saudi Arabia ===
Foreign relations of Saudi Arabia

- Diplomatic missions in Saudi Arabia

==== International organization membership ====
The Kingdom of Saudi Arabia is a member of:

- The executive board of UNESCO for 2019-2023

- African Development Bank Group (AfDB) (nonregional member)
- Arab Bank for Economic Development in Africa (ABEDA)
- Arab Fund for Economic and Social Development (AFESD)
- Arab Monetary Fund (AMF)
- Bank for International Settlements (BIS)
- Cooperation Council for the Arab States of the Gulf (GCC)
- Food and Agriculture Organization (FAO)
- Group of 77 (G77)
- Group of Twenty Finance Ministers and Central Bank Governors (G20)
- International Atomic Energy Agency (IAEA)
- International Bank for Reconstruction and Development (IBRD)
- International Chamber of Commerce (ICC)
- International Civil Aviation Organization (ICAO)
- International Criminal Police Organization (Interpol)
- International Development Association (IDA)
- International Federation of Red Cross and Red Crescent Societies (IFRCS)
- International Finance Corporation (IFC)
- International Fund for Agricultural Development (IFAD)
- International Hydrographic Organization (IHO)
- International Labour Organization (ILO)
- International Maritime Organization (IMO)
- International Mobile Satellite Organization (IMSO)
- International Monetary Fund (IMF)
- International Olympic Committee (IOC)
- International Organization for Migration (IOM) (observer)
- International Organization for Standardization (ISO)
- International Red Cross and Red Crescent Movement (ICRM)
- International Telecommunication Union (ITU)
- International Telecommunications Satellite Organization (ITSO)
- Inter-Parliamentary Union (IPU)
- Islamic Development Bank (IDB)
- League of Arab States (LAS)
- Multilateral Investment Guarantee Agency (MIGA)
- Nonaligned Movement (NAM)
- Organisation of Islamic Cooperation (OIC)
- Organisation for the Prohibition of Chemical Weapons (OPCW)
- Organization of American States (OAS) (observer)
- Organization of Arab Petroleum Exporting Countries (OAPEC)
- Organization of Petroleum Exporting Countries (OPEC)
- Permanent Court of Arbitration (PCA)
- United Nations (UN)
- United Nations Conference on Trade and Development (UNCTAD)
- United Nations Educational, Scientific, and Cultural Organization (UNESCO)
- United Nations Industrial Development Organization (UNIDO)
- United Nations Relief and Works Agency for Palestine Refugees in the Near East (UNRWA)
- Universal Postal Union (UPU)
- World Customs Organization (WCO)
- World Federation of Trade Unions (WFTU)
- World Health Organization (WHO)
- World Intellectual Property Organization (WIPO)
- World Meteorological Organization (WMO)
- World Tourism Organization (UNWTO)
- World Trade Organization (WTO)

=== Law and order in Saudi Arabia ===
- Capital punishment in Saudi Arabia
- Constitution of Saudi Arabia
- Crime in Saudi Arabia
- Human rights in Saudi Arabia
  - LGBT rights in Saudi Arabia
  - Freedom of religion in Saudi Arabia
  - Women's rights in Saudi Arabia
    - Gender segregation in Saudi Arabia
- Law enforcement in Saudi Arabia

=== Military of Saudi Arabia ===
Military of Saudi Arabia

- Command
  - Commander-in-chief:
    - Ministry of Defence of Saudi Arabia
- Forces
  - Defense Forces
    - Army of Saudi Arabia
    - Navy of Saudi Arabia
    - Air Force of Saudi Arabia
    - Royal Saudi Air Defense
    - Royal Saudi Strategic Missile Force
  - Guard Forces
    - Royal Guard
    - National Guard
- Military ranks of Saudi Arabia

=== Local government in Saudi Arabia ===
Local government in Saudi Arabia

== History of Saudi Arabia ==
History of Saudi Arabia

- Timeline of the history of Saudi Arabia
- Ancient towns in Saudi Arabia
- Economic history of Saudi Arabia
- History of the oil industry in Saudi Arabia
- Military history of Saudi Arabia
- Modern history of Saudi Arabia

== Culture of Saudi Arabia ==
Culture of Saudi Arabia

- Architecture of Saudi Arabia
  - Tallest buildings in Saudi Arabia
- Cuisine of Saudi Arabia
- Festivals in Saudi Arabia
- Languages of Saudi Arabia
- Media in Saudi Arabia
  - Newspapers in Saudi Arabia
  - Television in Saudi Arabia
- National symbols of Saudi Arabia
  - Emblem of Saudi Arabia
  - Flag of Saudi Arabia
  - National anthem of Saudi Arabia
- People of Saudi Arabia
- Polygamy in Saudi Arabia
- Prostitution in Saudi Arabia
- Public holidays in Saudi Arabia
- Records of Saudi Arabia
- Religion in Saudi Arabia
  - Buddhism in Saudi Arabia
  - Christianity in Saudi Arabia
  - Hinduism in Saudi Arabia
  - Irreligion in Saudi Arabia
  - Islam in Saudi Arabia
    - Shia Islam in Saudi Arabia
    - Ahmadiyya in Saudi Arabia
  - Judaism in Saudi Arabia
  - Sikhism in Saudi Arabia
- World Heritage Sites in Saudi Arabia
  - Mada'in Saleh
  - Rock Art in the Ha'il Region

=== Art in Saudi Arabia ===
- Art in Saudi Arabia
- Cinema of Saudi Arabia
- Literature of Saudi Arabia
- Music of Saudi Arabia
- Theatre in Saudi Arabia

=== Sports in Saudi Arabia ===
Sport in Saudi Arabia

- List of sports venues in Saudi Arabia
- Football in Saudi Arabia
  - Saudi Arabia national football team
  - Saudi Arabian Football Federation
- Saudi Arabia at the Olympics
- Sports venues in Saudi Arabia

== Economy and infrastructure of Saudi Arabia ==
Economy of Saudi Arabia

- Economic rank, by nominal GDP (2018): 18th
- Member of Group of Twenty (G20)
- Agriculture in Saudi Arabia
- Banking in Saudi Arabia
  - Banks in Saudi Arabia
- Communications in Saudi Arabia
  - Internet in Saudi Arabia
  - Telephone numbers in Saudi Arabia
- Companies of Saudi Arabia
- Currency of Saudi Arabia: Riyal
  - ISO 4217: SAR
- Energy in Saudi Arabia
  - Nuclear energy in Saudi Arabia
  - Oil industry in Saudi Arabia
  - Solar power in Saudi Arabia
- Health care in Saudi Arabia
- Mining in Saudi Arabia
- Saudi Arabian Stock Exchange
- Saudi Parallel Market (Nomu)
- Tourism in Saudi Arabia
- Transport in Saudi Arabia
  - Airports in Saudi Arabia
  - Rail transport in Saudi Arabia
  - Roads in Saudi Arabia
- Water supply and sanitation in Saudi Arabia
  - Irrigation in Saudi Arabia

== Education in Saudi Arabia ==
Education in Saudi Arabia

- Universities and colleges in Saudi Arabia

== See also ==
Saudi Arabia

- List of international rankings
- Member state of the Group of Twenty Finance Ministers and Central Bank Governors
- Member state of the United Nations
- Outline of Asia
- Outline of geography
