= Sens (disambiguation) =

Sens is a town and commune in France.

Sens or SENS may also refer to:

- Strategies for engineered negligible senescence, a regenerative medicine proposal
- SENS Research Foundation, a non-profit science organization
- Daewoo Sens, a Ukrainian version of the Daewoo Lanos automobile
- Ottawa Senators, a team in the National Hockey League
- S.E.N.S., a Japanese instrumental group
- Samsung Sens, a series of laptop computers
- Saudi Environmental Society
- System Event Notification Service in the Microsoft Windows operating system
- The Health Education Nature Sustainability Party, or SENS Party, in Romania
