= Sectarian violence among Muslims =

There is an ongoing conflict between Muslims of different sects, most commonly Shias and Sunnis, although the fighting extends to smaller, more specific branches within these sects, as well as Sufism. It has been documented as having gone on from Islam's beginnings up until the contemporary era.

== Modern ==
=== In Bahrain ===
Bahrain is ruled by the Al Khalifa family, who are part of the Sunni minority since 1783. Bahrain's Shia majority has often complained of receiving poor treatment in employment, housing, and infrastructure, while Sunnis have preferential status. The Bahraini government has reportedly imported Sunnis from Pakistan and Syria in an attempt to increase the Sunni percentage.

Shiite Muslims are blocked from serving in important political and military posts. Sunnis and Shia often stress that, no matter what their denomination, they are all Bahrainis first and foremost. However, sectarianism seethes below the surface of society.

Minor sectarian clashes have occurred during the Bahraini uprising. On 4 March 2011, about six people were injured in Hamad Town and police intervened to disperse young Shi'ites and largely recently naturalized Sunni Arabs who clashed with knives, sticks, and swords, witnesses said. It is unclear what caused the incident, with both sides blaming the other for the outbreak of violence. This incident marks the first sectarian violence since protests erupted on 14 February. A spokesman for Al Wefaq opposition party said the clashes were due to a dispute between families in the area and weren't sectarian. Others said that Shiite youth had targeted naturalized Sunnis living in the area.

=== In Bangladesh ===
On 24 October 2015, one person was killed and 80 injured in a bomb attack on an Ashura procession of the Shia Muslims community, in the Bangladeshi capital Dhaka, for which The Sunni terror group the Islamic State (IS) claimed responsibility.

On 26 November 2015, 1 person was killed and 3 injured in an attack by gunmen on a Shi'ite mosque in northern Bangladesh, for which The Sunni terror group the Islamic State (IS) claimed responsibility.

On 14 March 2016, Abdur Razzak, a top Shia preacher was hacked to death, for which The Sunni terror group the Islamic State (IS) claimed responsibility.

=== In Indonesia ===
In February 2011 three members of the Ahmadiyya movement were killed after a mob surrounded them accusing them of heresy.

=== In Iraq ===
Following the 2003 Invasion of Iraq and subsequent fall of Saddam Hussein's regime, the minority Sunni sect, which had previously enjoyed increased benefits under Saddam's rule, now found itself out of power as the Shia majority, suppressed under Saddam, sought to establish power. Such sectarian tensions resulted in a violent insurgency waged by different Sunni and Shia militant groups, such as al-Qaeda in Iraq and the Mahdi Army. Following the U.S. withdrawal in 2011, violence has increased to 2008 levels. Following February 2006 tens of thousands of people were killed across Iraq, when a civil war between the two Muslim rival sects erupted, lasting until 2008.

=== In Lebanon ===
Sectarian violence among Muslims in modern-day Lebanon is deeply embedded in the country's socio-political landscape, shaped by historical conflicts and regional dynamics. While Lebanon's civil war (1975–1990) is often perceived as a conflict between Christians and Muslims, it also intensified intra-Muslim sectarian divisions, particularly between Sunni and Shia communities. In the post-war era, the Shia-Sunni tensions exacerbated due to the displacement of populations, economic hardships, widespread corruption, and the resurgence of religious institutions. The political rise of Shia Muslims in Iraq following the 2003 U.S.-led invasion and the emergence of violent Sunni movements like al-Qaeda further polarised Muslims across the region. Within Lebanon, tensions have been fuelled by Hezbollah's alleged role in the assassination of former Prime Minister Rafiq al-Hariri and its provocative actions leading up to the 2006 war with Israel. Furthermore, Sunni communities increasingly view the group as an extension of Iran’s influence, fearing a so-called "Shia threat" driven by Iran’s expanding geopolitical influence, fostering further sectarian division and animosity in Lebanon.

=== In Saudi Arabia ===
The Grand Mufti of Saudi Arabia, Abdul-Aziz ibn Abdullah Al Shaykh, issued a fatwa on 12 September 2013 that suicide bombings are "great crimes" and bombers are "criminals who rush themselves to hell by their actions". Sheikh described suicide bombers as "robbed of their minds... who have been used (as tools) to destroy themselves and societies."

On 16 September 2013, he condemned violence against non-Muslims living in Islamic countries or Muslims labeled as infidels. The Grand Mufti condemned acts that cause the "shedding of blood of Muslims and of those living in their counties in peace." Sheikh Al Shaykh stated, "Given the dangerous developments in the Muslim world, I would like to warn against the danger of attacking Muslims and those (non-Muslims) under Muslim protection."

"In view of the fast-moving dangerous developments in the Islamic world, it is very distressing to see the tendencies of permitting or underestimating the shedding of blood of Muslims and those under protection in their countries. The sectarian or ignorant utterances made by some of these people would benefit none other than the greedy, vindictive and envious people. Hence, we would like to draw attention to the seriousness of the attacks on Muslims or those who live under their protection or under a pact with them," Sheikh Al-AsShaikh said, quoting a number of verses from the Qur'an and Hadith.

However, the Government of Saudi Arabia does discriminate against and/or persecute Shia Muslims, Ahmadiyya and even non–Salafist Sunni Islam.

=== In Somalia ===
Ahlu Sunna Waljama'a is a Somali paramilitary group consisting of Sufis and moderates opposed to the radical islamist group Al-Shabaab. They are fighting to prevent Wahhabism from being imposed on Somalia and protecting the country's Sunni-Sufi traditions and generally moderate religious views.

=== In Syria ===
Some analysts described segments of the Syrian Civil War (2011–2024) to be sectarian, particularly between the ruling Alawi Shias and Sunnis.

== See also ==
- Al-Baqara 256 ("There is no compulsion in religion.")
- Heresy
- Iran-Saudi Arabia proxy conflict
- Islamic schools and branches
- Sectarian violence amongst Muslims in China
- Islamic extremism
- Sectarian violence
- Sectarian violence among Christians
- Persecution of minority Muslim groups
- Persecution of Ahmadis
- Takfir
- Destruction of early Islamic heritage sites in Saudi Arabia
