= Al-Batin Club Stadium =

Multi-use stadium in Hafar al-Batin, Saudi Arabia

Coordinates: 28°26′55″N 46°04′30″E

Al-Batin Football Club Stadium
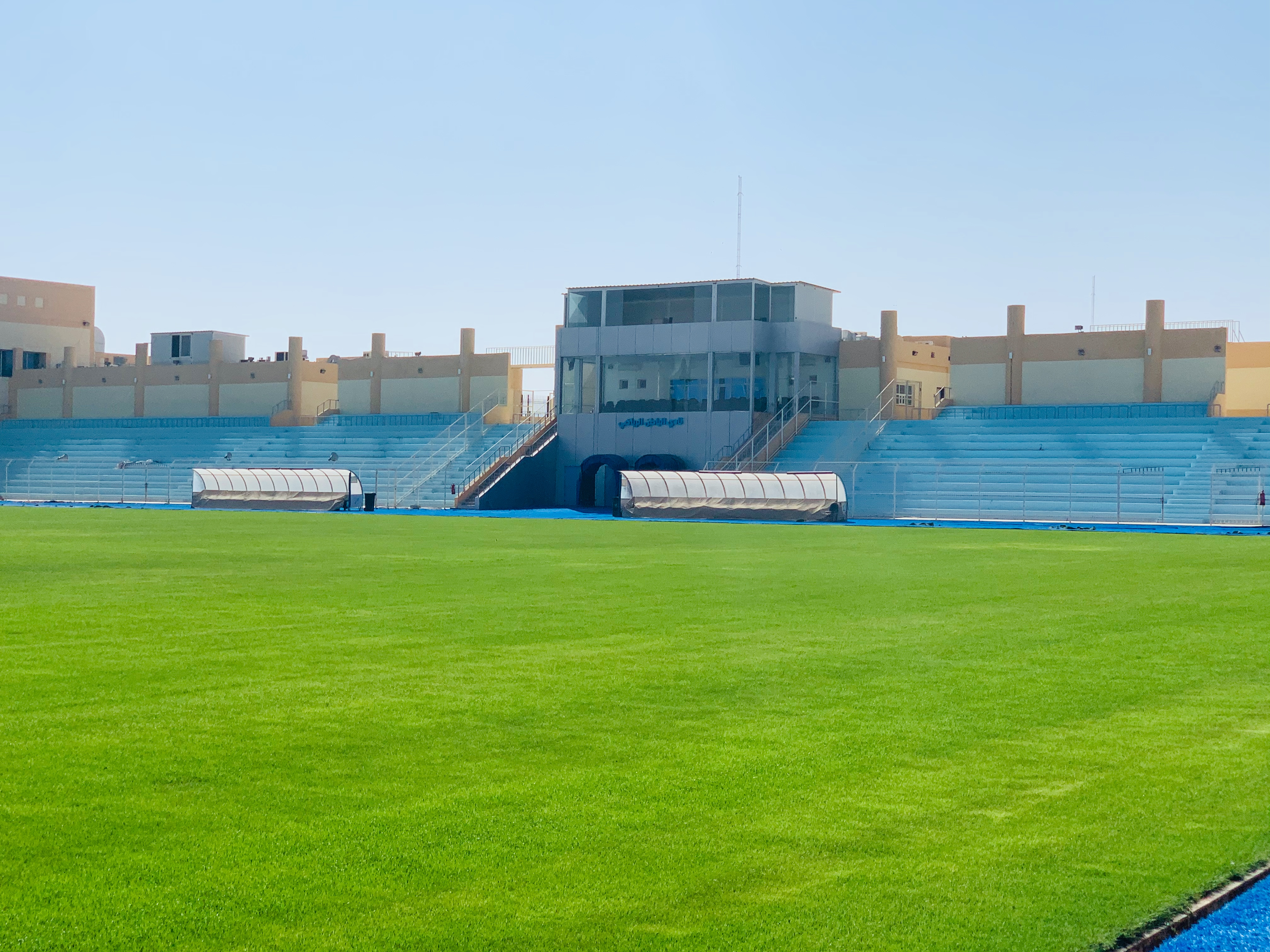
- Interactive map of Al-Batin Football Club Stadium
- Location: Hafar al-Batin, Saudi Arabia
- Owner: Saudi General Authority of Sports
- Capacity: 6,000
- Surface: AstroTurf
- Record attendance: 6,500 (Al-Batin vs Al-Ahli, 22 September 2017)

Construction
- Opened: April 2016

Tenants
- Al-Batin (2016–present); Al-Qaisumah (2016–present)

The Al-Batin Club Stadium (Arabic: استاد نادي الباطن) is a multi-use stadium in Hafar al-Batin, Saudi Arabia. It is currently used mostly for football matches and is the home stadium of Al-Batin. The stadium has a capacity of 6,000 seats. It was opened in April 2016.

== See also ==
- List of sports venues in Saudi Arabia
- List of football stadiums in Saudi Arabia
