= Magda Abu Ras =

Saudi Arabian microbiologist

- Born: Mecca
- Occupations: Microbiologist, environmentalist
- Board member of: Saudi Environmental Society

Academic background
- Education: King Abdulaziz University; University of Surrey
- Thesis: (2010)

Academic work
- Discipline: Environmental biotechnology
- Institutions: King Abdulaziz University

Magda Abu Ras (Arabic: ماجدة أبو راس) is a Saudi Arabian microbiologist, who is specialises in the treatment of oil-contaminated soils. She is Deputy Director of the Saudi Environmental Society (SENS) and founder of the National Program for Environmental Awareness and Sustainable Development.

== Education ==
Born in Mecca, Abu Ras holds two Masters qualifications: the first in microbiology from King Abdulaziz University; the second in biotechnology and environmental microbiology from the University of Surrey. She went on to be awarded a PhD in Environmental Biotechnology from Surrey in 2010 in the treatment of oil-contaminated soils.

== Career ==
In 2006 she launched the “I Love the Earth” campaign in Jeddah, which involved raising awareness of street pollution and cleaning. In 2009 she was appointed Deputy Director of the Saudi Environmental Society (SENS), of which she was a founding member. She was also Director of the Arab Women’s Environmental Development Program.

In 2012 she launched a national educational environmental awareness programme under the slogan Green Homeland, Green Flag. She was also selected as a regional scientist for NASA. She is outspoken on issues relating to recycling and pollution in the country.

Launched in 2018, she is the founder of the National Program for Environmental Awareness and Sustainable Development, which is administered by SENS. This programme is part of Saudi Vision 2030. The same year she supervised an environmental campaign which focussed on discouraging plastic use during Hajj, entitle Hajj without Plastic.

As of 2022, Abu Ras is Assistant Professor of Biotechnology at King Abdulaziz University.

== Awards ==
- Arab Women Leaders Award for the Environment, awarded by the Arab-European Organization for the Environment in Switzerland (April 2012)
- Business Award, awarded by Sayidaty Magazine (2017)
- “Takreem” Award for Sustainable Environmental Development, awarded under the auspices of the Emir of the State of Kuwait (2018)
