= International rankings of Saudi Arabia =

The following are international rankings of Saudi Arabia.

== Cities ==
Riyadh

- Metropolitan area by population
- Most expensive cities

== Communications ==
- The World Factbook: Second number of mobile phones in use ranked
- OECD: number of broadband Internet users ranked
- Economist Intelligence Unit: e-readiness 2008 ranked out of 70 countries
- The second position among G20 countries for telecoms expansion

== Demographics ==
- United Nations: Population ranked out of 216 countries
- Population density ranked out of 241 countries
- United Nations report World Population Policies 2005, Number of immigrants ranked out of 192 countries

== Economy ==
- United Nations: Human Development Index, ranked out of 177 countries
- Nominal GDP growth rate: ranked out of 215 countries
- Nominal GDP: ranked13 out of 179 countries ($ IMF; $ World Bank; $ CIA)
- Nominal GDP per capita 2006, ranked out of 179 IMF; out of 170 World Bank; out of 185 CIA
- A.T. Kearney/Foreign Policy Magazine: Globalization Index 2006, ranked out of 62 countries
- The Heritage Foundation/The Wall Street Journal: 2006^{[unfit]} Index of Economic Freedom, ranked out of 155 countries
- The Economist: Worldwide Quality-of-life Index, 2005, ranked out of 111 countries
- World Economic Forum: Global Competitiveness Index 2006–2007, ranked 24 out of 125 countries
- World Tourism Organization World Tourism rankings ranked out of all countries
- World Economic Forum: Travel and Tourism Competitiveness Report 2008, ranked out of 130 countries

== Education ==
According to ARWU

1 King Abdulaziz University 101–150 2 King Saud University 151–200 3 King Abdullah University of Science and Technology 201–300 4 King Fahd University of Petroleum & Minerals 401–500

== Energy ==
=== Oil ===
- The World Factbook: oil imports 2007, ranked 73 out of 207 countries
- The World Factbook: oil consumption 2009, ranked 9 out of 207 countries
- The World Factbook: oil exports 2007, ranked 1 out of 209 countries
- The World Factbook: oil production 2009, ranked 2 out of 208 countries
- The World Factbook: proven oil reserves 2010, ranked 1 out of 204 countries

=== Natural gas ===
- The World Factbook: natural gas imports 2008, ranked 135 out of 204 countries
- The World Factbook: natural gas consumption 2009, ranked 11 out of 209 countries
- The World Factbook: natural gas exports 208, ranked 130 out of 205 countries
- The World Factbook: natural gas production 2009, ranked 11 out of 207 countries
- The World Factbook: natural gas proven reserves 2010, ranked 5 out of 205 countries

== Environment ==
- Yale University Center for Environmental Law and Policy and Columbia University Center for International Earth Science Information Network: Environmental Sustainability Index, ranked out of 145 countries
- US Department of Energy: CO_{2} emissions per capita 2004, ranked out of 206 countries
- The World Factbook: water resources ranked out of 174 countries

== Geography ==
- Total area ranked out of 234 countries

== Globalization ==
- KOF: Index of Globalization 2007, ranked out of 122 countries
- A.T. Kearney/Foreign Policy Magazine: Globalization Index 2006, ranked out of 62 countries

== Industry ==
- OICA automobile production 2007, ranked out of 51 countries The first country of the Arab World to invest in industrial heritage, 2019, International Committee for the Conservation of the Industrial Heritage.

== Military ==
- Center for Strategic and International Studies: active troops ranked out of 166 countries

== Politics ==
- Transparency International: Corruption Perceptions Index, ranked 80th out of 180 countries
- Reporters without borders: Worldwide press freedom index, ranked 163 out of 167 countries
- The Economist Democracy Index 2007, ranked 161 out of 167 countries

== Society ==
- Save the Children: State of the World's Mothers report 2006, ranked out of 110 countries
- World Health Organization: Suicide rate ranked out of 100 countries

== Technology ==
- OECD: number of broadband Internet users 2007, ranked out of the 30 OECD countries
- Brown University Taubman Center for Public Policy 2006: ranked in online government services
- Internet Freedom
- The 2nd rank in the Arab World “25” in the Global Cybersecurity Index
- The 13th worldwide rank in Global Cybersecurity Index
- World Intellectual Property Organization: Global Innovation Index 2026, ranked 42 out of 139 countries

== Other ==
Organization	Survey	Ranking
Institute for Economics and Peace	Global Peace Index	104 out of 144
The Heritage Foundation/The Wall Street Journal	Index of Economic Freedom	65 out of 179
The Economist	Quality-of-life index	72 out of 111
The Economist	Democracy Index	161 out of 167
Reporters Without Borders	Worldwide Press Freedom Index	163 out of 175
Transparency International	Corruption Perceptions Index	63 out of 163
United Nations Development Programme	Human Development Index	59 out of 182
A.T. Kearney/Foreign Policy Magazine	Globalization Index	68 out of 122
Fund for Peace	Failed States Index	89 out of 177
Simon Anholt	Nation branding	47 out of 49
