= Environment of Saudi Arabia =

The desert-covered Kingdom of Saudi Arabia is the geographically largest country in the Middle East. Moreover, it accounts for 65% of the overall population of the GCC countries and 42% of its GDP. Saudi Arabia does not have a strong history in environmentalism. Thus, as the number of population increases and the industrial activity grows, environmental issues pose a real challenge to the country.

Lack of environmental policy can be linked to an enormous reliance on oil. Saudi Arabia is the fourth largest consumer of oil in the world, even as it is the 20th largest economy and 41st largest population. Due to intense fossil fuel usage, Saudi Arabia has generated a number of environmental issues. Urbanization and high standards of living contribute to ground, water, and air pollution. Agriculture and overconsumption of natural resources cause deforestation and desertification.

Likewise, Saudi Arabia's oil industry subsidizes energy use and magnifies carbon dioxide emissions. These environmental issues cause a variety of health problems including asthma and cancer. Some environmental action is taking place such as the construction of a renewable energy industry. Policies and programs are also being developed to ensure environmental sustainability.

== Background ==
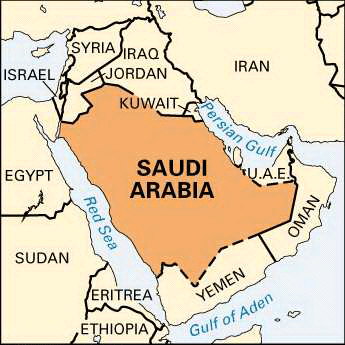
Map of Saudi Arabia

Saudi Arabia contains the largest known oil reserve. This generates an abundance of wealth for the country and places it as the number one oil exporter in the world. Oil extraction is a priority over environmental policy. While oil is not environmentally sustainable, Saudi Arabia has made some contributions to fighting climate change. The kingdom implemented its first environmental law in 1992, the Presidency of Meteorology and Environmental Protection Act. This measure was enacted to encourage environmental awareness and sustainable law creation. Moreover, Saudi Arabia and other Arab nations are working together to create a series of international environmental contracts. Saudi Arabia alone has signed eighteen pacts and ratified thirty-nine environmental agreements. Saudi Arabia's environmental performance index (EPI) is 55.3. The EPI is an internationally standardized scale, with 1 as the lowest environmental performance and 100 as the highest. The scale measures both environmental health and ecosystem viability. Out of Middle Eastern countries, Saudi Arabia ranks 9th on the EPI.

== Environmental challenges ==
=== Pollution ===
==== Oil pollution ====
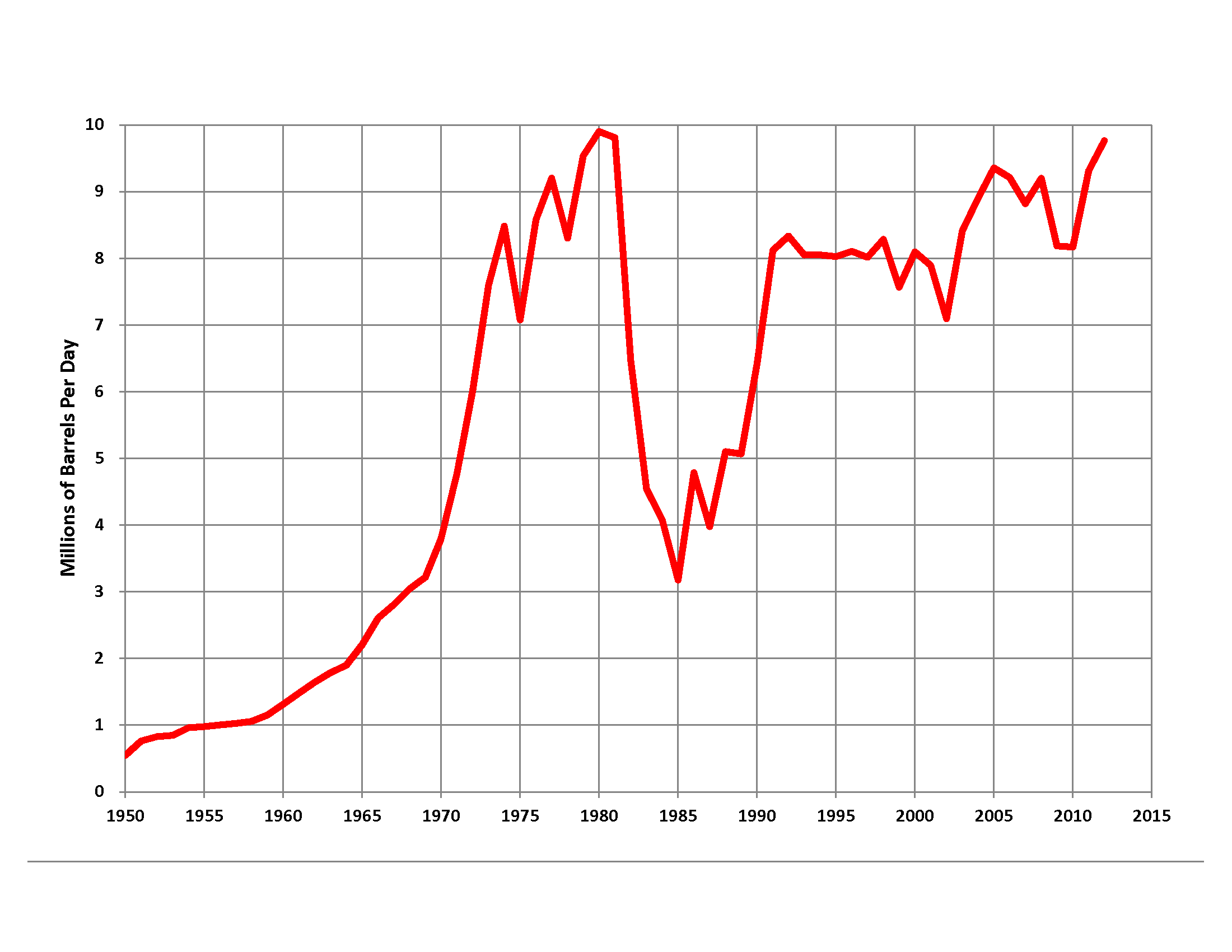
Oil Production in Saudi Arabia

As the largest oil exporter in OPEC, Saudi Arabia contributes to the immense environmental impacts associated with oil drilling. This includes hydraulic fracturing, oil spills, and air pollution. Saudi Arabia contributed to the world's most severe spill, the 1991 Gulf War Oil Spill. The environmental impacts from oil spills are long lasting and often irreversible. The Gulf War spill directly affected the Saudi Arabian shoreline. While initial research found minuscule long-term impacts, recent studies show oil persistence in ocean habitats. Oil persistence affects ecosystem relationships and the livelihood of all marine animals. The Gulf Coast spill increased the toxicity of Saudi Arabia's coastline. During the initial aftermath, only visible oil was removed from the Gulf. The rest of the spill has remained in the ocean for the past 25 years and contributes to high-risk amounts of hydrocarbons in the environment. Saudi Arabia's salt marshes have had a hard time recovering from past spills. Thick oil coverage permanently changed the biodiversity and chemical compositions of many ocean related habitats. This environmental damage will take decades to reverse.

An abundance of oil resources promotes wasteful energy practices throughout Saudi Arabia. The government encourages energy use through subsidies. Currently, these subsidies are higher than any other regime at a total of 43 billion US dollars a year. Inexpensive energy supports excessive energy use, contributing to high rates of domestic oil consumption. The hot, arid climate of the Middle East causes widespread use of air conditioning for climate control. Power consumption and carbon dioxide emissions increase each year.

==== Urban pollution ====
Urbanization causes ground, water, and air pollution. Increasingly urban areas call for more desalinated water and a growing water sector. Desalinization plants use greenhouse gasses and are highly inefficient. The process of oil extraction also contributes to air pollution by emitting high rates of carbon dioxide. Excess greenhouse gas emissions deplete the ozone and raise global temperatures.

Marine life and ocean ecosystems are threatened by urbanization as well. Coastline construction from residential and tourism projects increase the amount of untreated sewage released into the ocean and excess trash in cities. Construction and human activities lead to coastal reef damage and high ocean acidity. Urban and agricultural runoff frequently contaminate waters by releasing untreated waste.

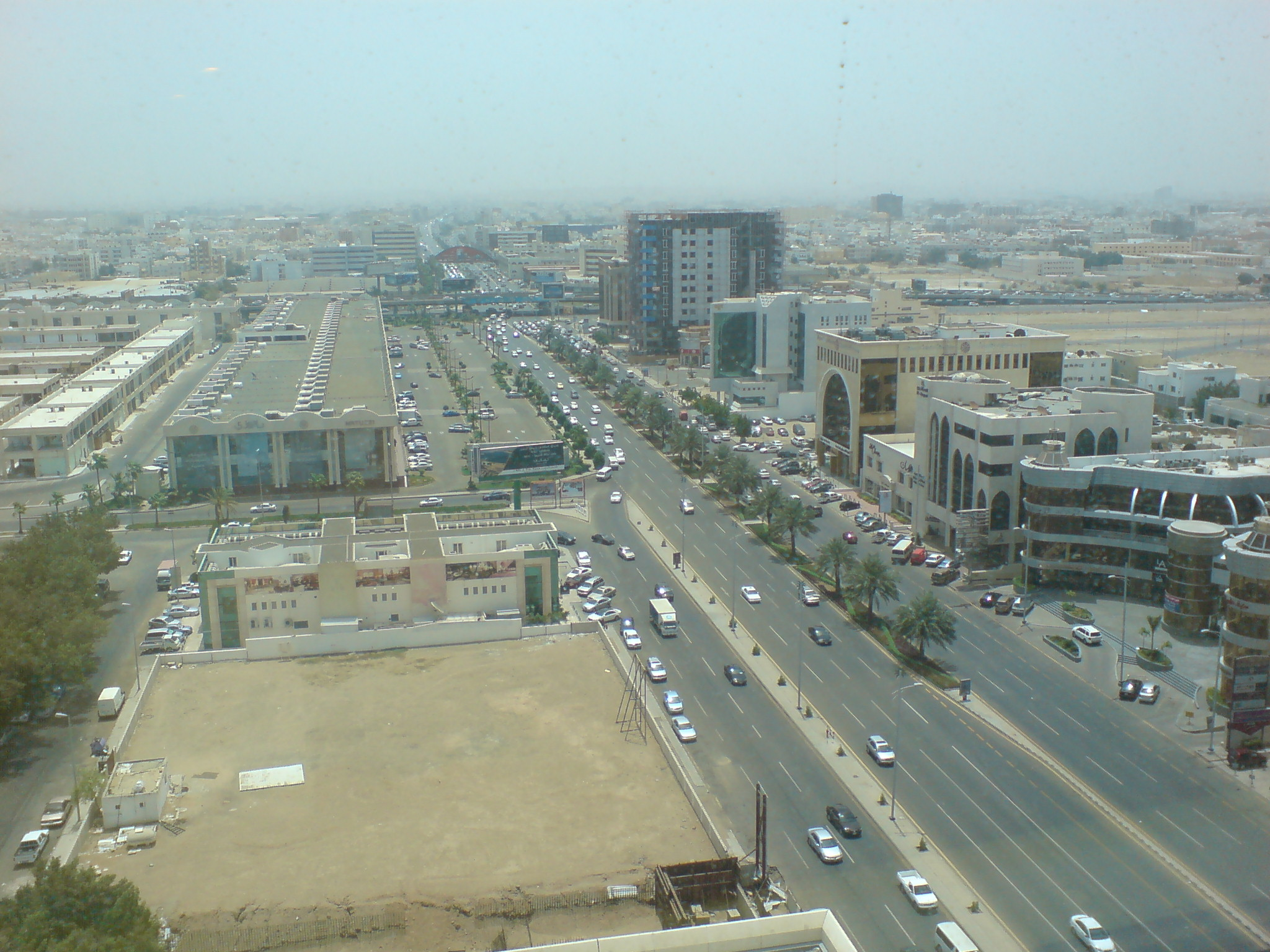
Jeddah, Saudi Arabia

Ground pollution results from both oil drilling and urbanization. The city of Jeddah and other urban areas face problems of heavy traffic that leads to roadside contamination and high carbon emissions. Saudi Arabia's high standard of living encourages fossil fuel based transportation. Saudi Arabia has yet to develop a concrete public transport sector. Therefore, private transportation is a major contributor to air pollution. Moreover, car usage and city life contribute to dangerous degrees of heavy metals in urban soils. These metals are harmful for both humans and plants, as soil contamination inhibits plant growth and are poisonous when ingested.

Saudi Arabian cities use air conditioning to maintain cool temperatures indoors as temperatures rise. Currently, Saudi Arabia holds the highest share of AC for household electricity consumption due to the rising heat in the country. Studies trace the warming temperature of approximately 3 °C in the past 40 years to the increasing amount of AC usage and the electricity demand that comes with it. The IPCC Fifth Assessment Report states that with high emissions, Saudi Arabian temperatures in 2080 will reach 5-7 °C higher than the 2000s. Cities along the coast are less sensitive to changes than the cities along the Persian Gulf coast. Northern regions and cities like Al Jawf, Ḥaʼil, Qassim, Sakākah, Buraydah, and Arar face higher temperature rates. This significant temperature increase impacts all aspects of life. The Saudi population will experience economic changes, such as a 1.3% decrease yearly in Saudi Arabian GDP, which will continue to rise to 5.4% in the long run. Mortality rates will increase as well due to rising temperatures. The G20 Climate Risk Analysis states that the high carbon pathway of Saudi Arabia if continued, will lead to sea temperature and level changes, forestry issues, and water contaminants that impact economic endeavors like agriculture, fisheries, infrastructure, and tourism.

Climate control technology is essential in Saudi Arabia when looking at the average family's temperatures and the architectural style of houses. Large villa-style houses require AC units in the majority of their large rooms. 73% of people in Saudi Arabia utilize air conditioning for over 10 hours out of the day, year-round, and a substantial majority of the 73% leave the machines running non-stop to combat deadly temperatures in the summer months. The association between increased electricity and increasing temperatures is expected but difficult for the country to combat as the problem worsens, requiring more air conditioning for most citizens to live comfortably. Saudi Arabia has begun to combat these issues through higher standards for AC, building codes, and public programs to raise awareness for energy usage.

=== Deforestation and desertification ===
Urbanization, expansion of agriculture, and energy consumption contribute to deforestation. Wood is the primary natural resource used in local communities. Studies show that wood is often used inefficiently by people living in rural, traditional housing. Saudi Arabia's growing population increases food insecurity. In turn, forests are cleared at higher rates to make more area for agriculture. Deforestation occurs both legally and illegally. Research on woodland conservation shows that there are few initiatives taking place to slow deforestation.

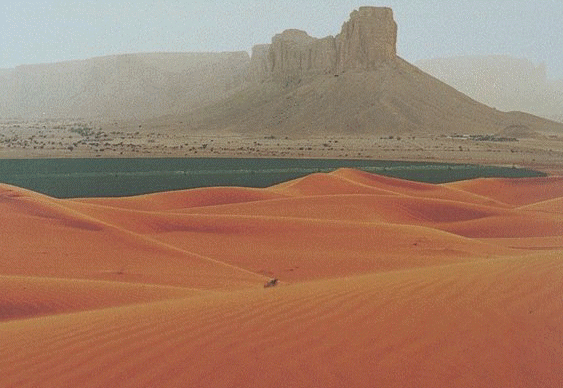
Saudi Arabian desert

Increasing global temperatures are projected to accelerate desertification within Saudi Arabia. Desertification will have a variety of impacts on the country's population. Desertification limits residential expansion and prevents small scale farmers from gaining access to lands. The growing industrial agriculture sector contributes to desertification. Mass monoculture disrupts soil processes and depletes the fertile soils on nutrients. The expansion of industrial agriculture misuses the scarce water resources available to Saudi Arabian farmers. This practice depletes naturally fertile land of water, leading to desertification as well.

=== Coastal erosion ===
Carbon cycles can contribute to the rising of sea levels and other physical changes in the environment. High transfer of carbon between bodies of water contributes to the rising sea levels on the coast of Saudi Arabia. Along with coastal sea levels rising, evidence of coastal erosion, and changing storm patterns are also evident. As a consequence of sea levels rising, there is flooding on the coastal districts of the provinces of Jeddah, Yanbu, Rabigh and Gizan, which are the most vulnerable to coastal flooding and erosion because of their location on the Western coast of Saudi Arabia, on the Red sea.

Specifically, in Jeddah, in November 2009 and again in 2022 the city experienced flooding along the coast due to changes in weather patterns consisting of thunderstorms and heavy rain. Of Jeddah's coast range total, the flooded areas range from 8.3-1398 km2. Jeddah has what is considered a more flat landscape, which makes it more vulnerable to rising sea levels.

The areas on the Western Coast in Jeddah that are at mean sea level are 165 km2 and the area above mean sea level is 4405 km2.

In terms of infrastructure in Jeddah, green, built-up/ road, as well as industrial infrastructure has not been impacted by the rising sea levels, making this area somewhat secure from sea levels rising. Research on Sea Levels and land use can be challenging due to the difficulty of projecting future changes that are accurate and consistent with each other, as well as gathering data that is extensive and reliable.

== Environmental action ==
=== Renewable energy ===
As of 2009, there are no programs encouraging reduced fossil fuel use. Although the government provides subsidies for oil consumption, record breaking oil use has pushed policy towards renewable energy. Peak load, where high energy use creates power outages, is a common fear among the citizens of Saudi Arabia. This anxiety creates further urgency for alternate energy plans to support the population. Mass oil consumption is not sustainable. This realization recently created a new market for renewable energies and further research for cleaner initiatives. Scholars are developing plans to help Saudi Arabia make a transition towards renewable energy. Thus, Saudi Arabia is ranked the 6th worldwide in solar energy potential.

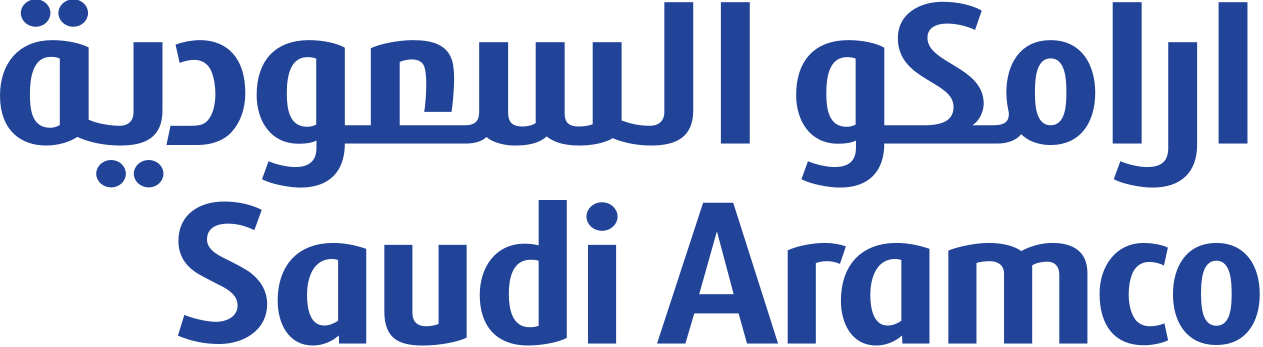
Saudi Aramco Logo

As opposed to overall energy reduction, the government organization Saudi Aramco wishes to create a solar energy sector. Saudi Arabia has a goal to create 41 GW of renewable energy plants, which would place the country as a leading solar energy exporter. Currently, the country is at 17 MW of solar energy and has a ways to go before reaching the goal. Hydroelectric and water based powers are also being discussed as alternatives to carbon emitting energies. Recently, and particularly in 2019, Saudi Arabia signed a number of agreements to implement mega wind projects as part of its plan to incorporate 5 gigawatt of wind power into its grid.

Concerns of inefficiency and expense are holding Saudi Arabia back from converting to renewable energy. Long-term costs for environmentally friendly practices are low. However, developers often ignore environmental restrictions during oil expansion. It is possible for Saudi Arabia to reduce carbon dioxide emissions and encourage renewable energy use. Preoccupation on energy security strengthen the movement towards renewable energies. The current wealth from oil abundance and pressure from international organizations could encourage the energy sector to move towards sustainable policy. Natural resources are finite. The transition from voluntary sustainability to mandatory environmental regulation can push Saudi Arabia towards environmentally friendly practices. In the framework of Saudi Vision 2030, Saudi Arabia is opt to increase its renewable energy supply by 30%. This is planned to be achieved by partnering Shanghai Electric.

ACWA power is the main hub for renewable energy, with their headquarters in Saudi Arabia. ACWA works in power generation, desalination of water and production plants in order to bring cheaper renewable energy and desalinated water to Saudi Arabia as part of the private energy sector.

Desalinated water is sea water that has been filtered so that the salt and other impurities within the sea water are take out and the water then becomes safe for human consumption.

Saudi Arabia's National Renewable energy program (NREP), which is led by the ministry of energy, looks over all legal and regulatory energy frameworks, and backs any initiatives for renewable energy. They have initiated recent renewable energy projects in Saudi Arabia including Solar and hydrogen plants.

Layla PV Solar Independent power project is a solar plant project that was built in Aflaj governorate, Riyadh province in Saudi Arabia by backing from the NREP in effort to establish a first round of renewable energy production in the Kingdom.

In addition to the Layla PV Solar Independent power project, the NEOM Green Hydrogen Plant is a hydraulic alternative to the same renewable energy efforts. NEOM green Hydrogen plant is based in Oxagon a city in NEOM, Saudi Arabia that was created as a port city but is entirely floating, on the coast of the Red Sea and runs entirely on clean energy . The NEOM Green Hydrogen plant was launched in 2021 and aims for net zero emissions by 2060.

The First Saudi Environment Week

The Ministry of Environment, Water and Agriculture organized in 2019 the first Saudi Environment Week. The motto of the event was "protecting our environment for our society's well-being". The event was organized in 13 Saudi provinces where around 230,715 wild trees were planted.

=== Environmental policy and programs ===
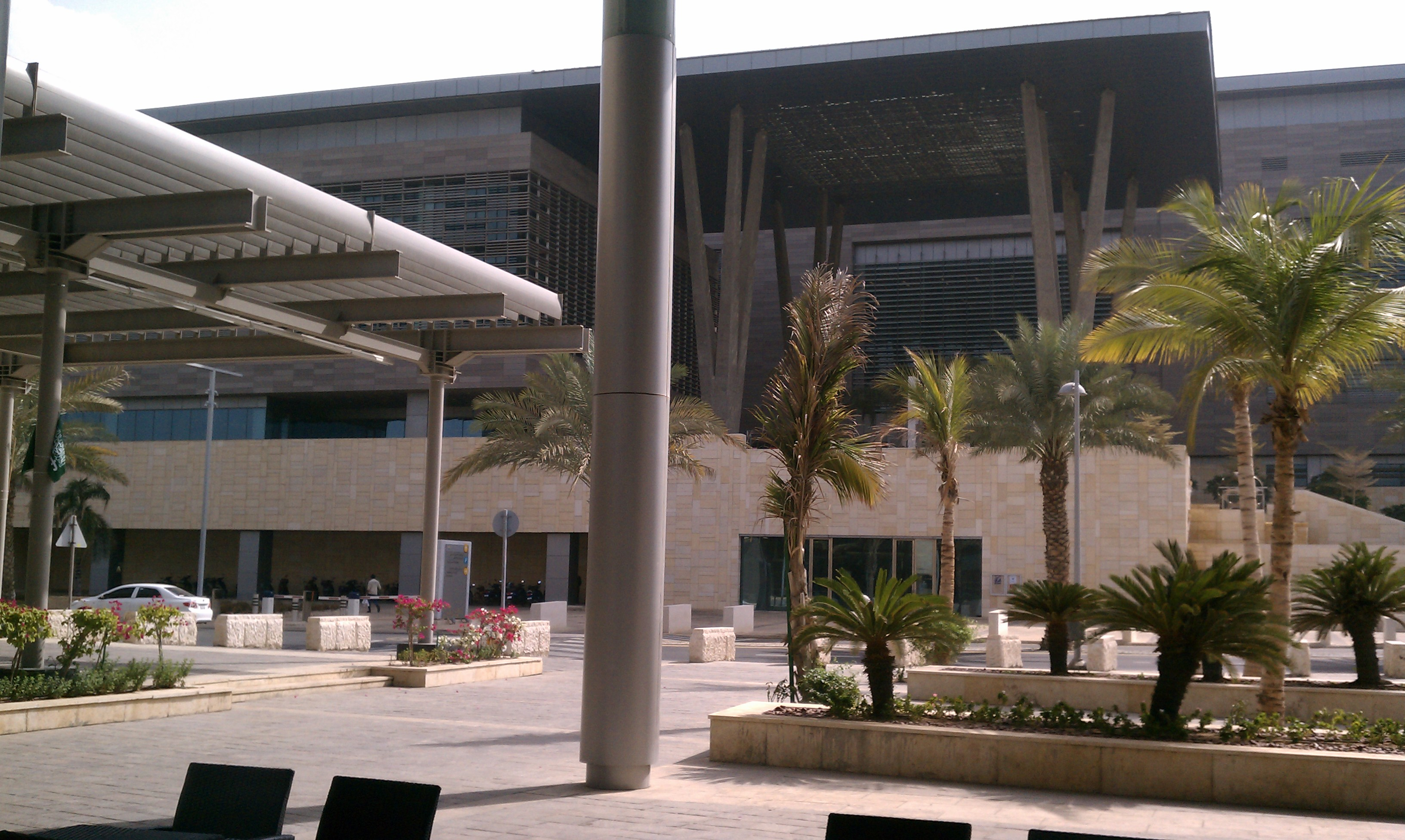
King Abdullah University of Science and Technology (KAUST) Student Services Building

The General Authority of Meteorology and Environmental Protection, or PME, is the Saudi Arabian environmental protection agency that handles all environmental policy. Due to a lack of natural Gulf Coast restoration, the Kingdom is implementing a plan to restore the coast from oil pollution. A scientific evaluation of the coastline's toxicity is underway in hopes to rebuild the coastal environment. The government recently created the King Abdullah University of Science and Technology (KAUST), an institute dedicated towards efficient, environmentally friendly energy use. The organization is working towards a city model that only uses nuclear and renewable energies.

The National Commission for Wildlife Conservation and Development (NCWCD) is a government sector created for endangered animal preservation. The Saudi government works towards creating designated areas for wildlife protection and natural resource conservation. The parks limit hunting and human development to preserve unique plant and animal species. The goal of the NCWCD is to revive destroyed areas and maintain biodiversity while increasing public environmental education research. Specifically, the NCWCD strives to protect the lava field in Harrat Al-Harrah and the sand sea and cuesta in Uruq Bani Mu'arid. The NCWCD recognizes 15 sites for their biodiversity, 12 on land and three on the sea. They seek to increase this number to 75, including 62 sites on land and 13 at sea.

The Saudi Green Initiative in 2021 announced a plan for the largest afforestation project in Saudi Arabia. This includes planting 10 billion trees within the Kingdom's borders and rehabilitating 40 million hectares of land. The Kingdom aims to produce 450 million trees by 2030. They seek to accomplish this through creating carbon sinks through urban planning and creating green spaces within cities. The Kingdom aims to combat urban sprawl through these green spaces with this program. As of October 2023, the Kingdom announced at the MENA Climate Week event that between 2017 and 2023, they've successfully planted 41 million trees. They also reworked their original plan of the rehabilitation of 40 million hectares of land to 74.8 million, pushing an even more ambitious policy.

In hope to increase environmental awareness to schoolchildren the government has partnered with the United States to create the Global Learning and Observations to Benefit the Environment (GLOBE) program. The goal of the program is to increase international environmental awareness through education and technology. The courses implement environmental issues and solutions into every subject. GLOBE trains teachers and supplies them with instruction materials in both Saudi Arabia and the United States. Students are exposed to the complexity of international environmental issues and the environmental problems stemming from globalization.

In order to boost organic agriculture, the Ministry of Environment, Water and Agriculture allocated an amount of $431,000 to help many farmers go organic. In addition, in 2018, the organic farming action plan was unveiled, which planned to allocate 200 million dollars toward increasing organic agriculture by 300% with an emphasis on safety, sustainability, and high-profit farming to benefit the economy.

In the 2019th G20 meeting in Japan, Saudi Arabia addressed the issue of climate change by introducing the Saudi efforts to produce and increase the production of renewable energy.

KSA launched an initiative to restore mangrove forests. Since 2020, more than 37 million seedlings have been planted as part of a plan to reach 100 million seedlings by 2030, with the focus on native species adapted to the coastal environment. The initiative is part of the Kingdom’s efforts to restore coastal ecosystems, in line with the goals of Vision 2030 and the Sustainable Development Goals, and in cooperation with Food and Agriculture Organization (FAO).

In 2025, in collaboration with FAO and the World Overview of Conservation Approaches and Technologies, KSA organized a training program for national experts. It also implemented four sand fixation pilot projects in the Eastern Region, which demonstrated promising results in fixing sand dune movement, increasing vegetation cover, and restoring ecological balance in fragile areas.

== Future Prospects ==
In 2019, Saudi Arabia started to take serious steps to reduce the consumption of fossil fuels as a source of electricity. Thus, Saudi Arabia planned to build the largest wind farm in the Middle East. The farm is under construction in Dumat Al-Jandal, Al Jawf region, Saudi Arabia. An amount of $500 million is allocated to construct the wind farm with a capacity of 400 megawatts (MW). Carbon emissions are expected to be reduced by 880,000 tons every year. The wind farm was connected to the grid as of August 2021. This power now supplies 70,000 homes in Saudi Arabia, and several more major projects amounting to 11.4GW are currently in the works.

Saudi and Middle East Green initiatives have set several environmental policy goals. This includes a goal of reaching 50% of renewable energy production by 2030 and aiming to be net zero by 2060. The Saudi government has set several ambitious climate goals for the Kingdom's Saudi Vision 2030 project.

== Controversy ==
Although the Saudi government has engaged in some reduction of emissions and set ambitious environmental policy at home, they remain a large contributor to the global export of oil, a large carbon emitter. The Kingdom seeks to burn less oil at home to have a larger supply to sell abroad. Saudi officials at the UN Conference of the Parties in Glasgow and Sharm el Sheikh have been accused of blocking efforts that may threaten global oil demand. This places a question mark on the legitimacy of environmental policy and the sincerity of the Kingdom to reduce its emissions.

== See also ==
- Saudi Environmental Society
- General Authority of Meteorology and Environmental Protection
- Saudi Vision 2030

== Suggested readings ==
- Energy and the Environment: Concerns and Opportunities by Nahed Taher
- Encyclopedia of Global Warming and Climate Change by Bill Kte'pi
- Renewable Energy Scenarios For Major Oil Producing Nations: The Case of Saudi Arabia by Yasser Al-saleh
- Protected Areas in Saudi Arabia: Sustainable Use of Natural Resources by Abdullah Alwelaje
