= Saudi Environmental Society =

Saudi Environmental Society (SENS)
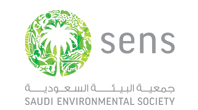
- Company type: Non Profit
- Founded: 2006
- Headquarters: Jeddah
- Key people: Turki bin Nasser bin Abdulaziz: (President)

The Saudi Environmental Society (SENS; Arabic: جمعية البيئة السعودية) is a Saudi society was founded as a national non-profit society in 2006 according to a decision of the Ministry of Social Affairs No. (34770), and is registered in the charities records under the number (335) and the date of 14/5/1427 AH. The Saudi Environment Society is chaired by Prince Turki bin Nasser.

Under this decision – the founding decision – a number of missions have been authorized to the society, mainly the development of the Saudi environment and improving the residents’ conditions in regions and provinces that suffer environmental problems by working on creating sustainable development programs. In addition to working on developing the voluntary action by creating a broad base of volunteers and to contribute in strengthening the role of the private sector to serve the environmental issues in the areas of environmental protection and conservation of natural resources and wildlife.

== Board of directors ==
- Turki bin Nasser, President of Saudi Environment Society
- Abdul Aziz Al Hamid Abu Znadh, vice President
- Faisal Hamzah Abu Rdeif, Secretary
- Osama Abdullah Kokandi, Treasurer
- Saleh Mohammed Bin Laden, Board Member
- Tariq Abdul Hadi Taher, Board Member
- Saied Fathi Khaweli, Board Member
- Engineer Adel Salem Badeeb, Board Member
- Magda Abu Ras, Deputy Director
