= List of sports venues in Saudi Arabia =

This is a list of sports venues in Saudi Arabia:

== Riyadh ==
- King Fahd International Stadium, Opened 1987, Capacity 75,000.
- Prince Faisal bin Fahd Stadium, Opened 1971, Capacity 30,000.

== Jeddah ==
- King Abdullah Sports City, Opened 2014, Capacity 62,345.
- Prince Abdullah al-Faisal Stadium, Opened 1970, Capacity 25,000.
- Prince Sultan bin Fahd Stadium, Opened 1987, Capacity 15,000.

== Others ==
- Department of Education Stadium (Unaizah) Opened 1 March 1987, Capacity 10,000.
- King Abdul Aziz Stadium in Mecca, Opened 1986, Capacity 17,000.
- King Fahd Stadium, Taif Opened ?, Capacity 20,000.
- Prince Abdul Aziz bin Musa'ed Stadium Opened ?, Capacity 20,000.
- Prince Mohamed bin Fahd Stadium Opened ?, Capacity 35,000.
- Prince Mohammed bin Abdul Aziz Stadium Opened ?, Capacity 20,000.
- Prince Saud bin Jalawi Stadium Opened 1982, Capacity 20,000.
- Prince Sultan bin Abdul Aziz Stadium Opened ?, Capacity 20,000.
