= Ahmadiyya in Saudi Arabia =

Islamic movement

Ahmadiyya is a persecuted religion in Saudi Arabia. Although there are many foreign workers and Saudi citizens belonging to the Ahmadiyya movement in Saudi Arabia, Ahmadi Muslims can visit and live in Saudi Arabia but not practice their faith openly. In Mecca and Medina there is no law saying explicitly Ahmadis are banned from entering the holy cities and many Ahmadis do go on Hajj and Umrah successfully as long as they don’t preach against Salafi interpretation or criticise monarchy

== History ==
From the very early history of the Ahmadiyya Movement in the late 19th century, Ahmadis have had contact with the region in what were then a host of Ottoman provinces in the Arabian peninsula, primarily due to their spiritual connection to the two holy cities of Mecca and Medina. The first Arab Ahmadi from the region, according to Ahmadiyya historical records, was Sheikh Muhammad bin Ahmad al-Makki, a resident of Shi'b 'Amir in the city of Mecca. Upon visiting India in 1891 and hearing of Mirza Ghulam Ahmad and his claim, he initially wrote an invective letter to him but upon meeting with him at Ludhiana, pledged his allegiance to Ghulam Ahmad and joined the Ahmadiyya movement. He remained for some time at Qadian before returning to Mecca in 1893 and maintained correspondence with Ghulam Ahmad requesting him to send some literature so as to distribute in Mecca. In response Ghulam Ahmad authored the book Hamāmat-ul-Bushra (The Dove of Glad Tidings) in Arabic and sent it to Mecca. Other literature also seems to have been sent to Arabia. Another individual by the name of Uthman a resident of Ta'if, is registered in Ahmadiyya records as having pledged allegiance to Mirza Ghulam Ahmad, but nothing much is known of him except his name and residence. Both of these persons were also included by Ghulam Ahmad in a list of 313 of his companions.

In September 1912, Mirza Bashir-ud-Din Mahmud Ahmad, the eldest son of Ghulam Ahmad, travelled to the Hejaz, with Mir Nasir Nawab – his maternal grandfather, and Sayyid Abdul Hayyi Arab – a companion of Ghulam Ahmad, and performed the Hajj pilgrimage. This was before he became the second Khalifa of the Ahmadiyya movement in 1914, succeeding his predecessor Hakeem Noor-ud-Din, the first Khalifa. Noor-ud-Din had himself lived in the Hejaz for some years in the late 1860s in pursuit of religious learning, approximately 20 years before the birth of the movement.

== Modern status ==
There are no accurate figures for the number of Ahmadis in Saudi Arabia. However, Ahmadi Muslims are a small community, primarily foreign workers from India and Pakistan and some from other countries. There is an increasing number of Saudi citizens who belong to the movement. Since the Ahmadiyya faith is banned in the country, there are no Ahmadi mosques. Ahmadis generally gather together in private properties for their daily prayers, thereby limiting exposure to the local authorities.

In a 2006–2007 nationwide campaign to track down and deport Ahmadi Muslim foreign workers, the Saudi religious police arrested 56–60 Ahmadi Muslims of Indian, Pakistani and Syrian origin from major cities across the country. In late December 2006, several dozen Saudi police raided a private guest house in Jeddah in Western Saudi Arabia, and detained 49 Ahmadi Muslims, including women, children and infants. A fortnight later, in early January 2007, the police arrested 5 Ahmadis from major industrial cities of Jubail and Dammam in the Eastern Province. The police failed to arrest the leader of the movement in Dammam, because he was out of the country at the time. In February of the same year, two more Ahmadi guest workers were arrested from the capital of the country Riyadh, in central Saudi Arabia. The arrests came under the orders of Minister of Interior Prince Nayef, and targeted Ahmadis solely because of their faith. Despite calls from international human rights groups, by April 2007, 58 Ahmadi Muslims were deported to their country of origin.

In May 2012, Saudi authorities arrested two Saudi citizens because of their conversion to the Ahmadiyya movement. Saudi officials encouraged them to abandon their beliefs, and three months later, they were detained. They have not been released since then.

=== Pilgrimage ===
Although Ahmadi Muslims are not openly permitted to enter the holy cities of Mecca or Medina by law, there are reportedly many Ahmadis who do perform Hajj and Umrah, the Islamic pilgrimage to Mecca and Medina. Pakistan raises an additional barrier to performing Hajj. It requires that all Muslims applying for a passport must denigrate the founder of the community, Mirza Ghulam Ahmad, and declare that all Ahmadis are non-Muslims.

== See also ==
- Shi'a Islam in Saudi Arabia
- Islam in Saudi Arabia
- Christianity in Saudi Arabia
