= 2022–23 Al-Batin FC season =

Al-Batin
2022–23 season
- President: Nasser Al-Huwaidi
- Manager: Alen Horvat (until 19 February); Zdravko Logarušić (from 19 February)
- Stadium: Al-Batin Club Stadium
- SPL: 16th (relegated)
- King Cup: Quarter-finals (knocked out by Al-Wehda)
- Top goalscorer: League: Yousef Al-Shammari (9 goals); All: Yousef Al-Shammari (10 goals)
- Highest home attendance: 4,096 (vs. Al-Nassr, 15 September 2022)
- Lowest home attendance: 3,182 (vs. Damac, 6 October 2022)
- Average home league attendance: 3,418
- All statistics correct as of 31 May 2023.

The 2022–23 season was Al-Batin's 44th year in their existence and the sixth non-consecutive season in the Pro League. The club participated in the Pro League and the King Cup.

The season covered the period from 1 July 2022 to 30 June 2023.

== Players ==
=== Squad information ===
As of 1 February 2023

Note: Flags indicate national team as defined under FIFA eligibility rules; some limited exceptions apply. Players may hold more than one non-FIFA nationality.

No.	Pos.	Nation	Player
1	GK	KSA	Basil Al-Bahrani
2	DF	KSA	Abdulkareem Al-Muziel
3	DF	KSA	Mohammad Naji
4	DF	BRA	Maurício Antônio
5	DF	SDN	Ibrahim Jamal
6	MF	KSA	Bassam Al-Hurayji
7	MF	KSA	Yousef Al-Shammari
8	MF	COL	Sebastián Pedroza (on loan from Independiente Santa Fe)
10	MF	COL	Andrés Felipe Roa
11	MF	COD	André Bukia (on loan from Arouca)
13	DF	KSA	Abdullah Al-Yousef (on loan from Al-Fateh)
14	MF	KSA	Othman Awad
15	MF	KSA	Hasan Ghazwani
16	MF	KSA	Omar Al-Sohaymi
17	MF	KSA	Yahya Al-Qarni
18	MF	KSA	Mohammed Fraih
19	FW	KSA	Abdulrahman Saad
20	MF	KSA	Tariq Al-Mutairi
21	MF	KSA	Abdulelah Al-Barrih
22	GK	KSA	Meshal Hariss
23	DF	FRA	Thibault Peyre

No.	Pos.	Nation	Player
24	DF	KSA	Saqr Mamdouh
25	GK	URU	Martín Campaña
26	GK	KSA	Falah Al-Shammeri
29	DF	KSA	Bader Nasser
30	GK	KSA	Yazan Jari
31	FW	URU	Renzo López
32	GK	KSA	Hammad Al-Shammeri
33	DF	KSA	Faisal Abo Bakr
37	MF	KSA	Turki Al-Dhafiri
40	FW	KSA	Abdullah Hakami
41	MF	KSA	Mohammed Taisir
42	DF	KSA	Aqeel Al-Dhafiri
43	DF	KSA	Ali Al-Shammari
44	MF	KSA	Abdulsalam Al-Ameri
45	FW	KSA	Abdulrahman Anwar
46	MF	KSA	Omar Sattam
70	MF	KSA	Rakan Al-Shamlan
77	FW	KSA	Yousef Fawaz
88	MF	KSA	Jathob Muslet
90	MF	GHA	Salifu Mudasiru (on loan from Asante Kotoko)
94	MF	KSA	Nawaf Al-Sohaymi

== Transfers and loans ==
=== Transfers in ===
Entry date	Position	No.	Player	From club	Fee	Ref.
30 June 2022	FW	15	(Saudi Arabia) Mohammed Al-Dhefiri	(Saudi Arabia) Ohod	End of loan	
30 June 2022	FW	77	(Saudi Arabia) Hassan Sharahili	(Saudi Arabia) Al-Jabalain	End of loan	
20 July 2022	DF	2	(Saudi Arabia) Abdulkareem Al-Muziel	(Saudi Arabia) Al-Nassr	Free	
20 July 2022	MF	16	(Saudi Arabia) Omar Al-Sohaymi	(Saudi Arabia) Al-Ain	Free	
21 July 2022	MF	17	(Saudi Arabia) Yahya Al-Qarni	(Saudi Arabia) Al-Jabalain	Free	
24 July 2022	MF	–	(Saudi Arabia) Abdulaziz Al-Jebreen	(Saudi Arabia) Al-Ittihad	Free	
26 July 2022	DF	–	(Iraq) Saad Natiq	(Iraq) Al-Shorta	Undisclosed	
1 August 2022	GK	1	(Saudi Arabia) Basil Al-Bahrani	(Saudi Arabia) Al-Fateh	Free	
1 August 2022	MF	15	(Saudi Arabia) Hassan Ghazwani	(Saudi Arabia) Al-Ettifaq	Free	
1 August 2022	MF	94	(Saudi Arabia) Nawaf Al-Sohaymi	(Saudi Arabia) Al-Kawkab	Free	
18 August 2022	DF	33	(Somalia) Faisal Abu Bakr	(Saudi Arabia) Al-Jeel	Free	
18 August 2022	MF	21	(Saudi Arabia) Abdulelah Al-Barrih	(Saudi Arabia) Damac	Undisclosed	
6 January 2023	DF	23	(France) Thibault Peyre	(Belgium) Mechelen	Undisclosed	
7 January 2023	MF	10	(Colombia) Andrés Felipe Roa	(Argentina) Argentinos Juniors	Free	
7 January 2023	FW	31	(Uruguay) Renzo López	(Argentina) Central Córdoba	Undisclosed	
29 January 2023	GK	30	(Saudi Arabia) Yazan Jari	(Saudi Arabia) Damac	Free	

=== Loans in ===
Start date	End date	Position	No.	Player	From club	Fee	Ref.
20 July 2022	26 August 2022	FW	–	(Saudi Arabia) Turki Al-Mutairi	(Saudi Arabia) Al-Hilal	None	
23 July 2022	End of season	MF	8	(Colombia) Juan Pedroza	(Colombia) Independiente Santa Fe	None	
7 January 2023	End of season	MF	90	(Ghana) Salifu Mudasiru	(Ghana) Asante Kotoko	None	
8 January 2023	End of season	DF	13	(Saudi Arabia) Abdullah Al-Yousef	(Saudi Arabia) Al-Fateh	None	
19 January 2023	End of season	MF	11	(Democratic Republic of the Congo) André Bukia	(Portugal) Arouca	None	

=== Transfers out ===
Exit date	Position	No.	Player	To club	Fee	Ref.
30 June 2022	DF	50	(Saudi Arabia) Abdulaziz Al-Alawi	(Saudi Arabia) Al-Nassr	End of loan	
30 June 2022	MF	28	(Saudi Arabia) Mohammed Al-Qarni	(Saudi Arabia) Al-Wehda	End of loan	
30 June 2022	MF	28	(Saudi Arabia) Hussain Al-Eisa	(Saudi Arabia) Al-Wehda	End of loan	
30 June 2022	FW	20	(Saudi Arabia) Abdulaziz Al-Aryani	(Saudi Arabia) Al-Ittihad	End of loan	
1 July 2022	GK	1	(Saudi Arabia) Hani Al-Nahedh	(Saudi Arabia) Al-Riyadh	Free	
1 July 2022	FW	77	(Saudi Arabia) Hassan Sharahili	(Saudi Arabia) Al-Arabi	Free	
3 July 2022	MF	21	(Saudi Arabia) Zakaria Sami	(Saudi Arabia) Abha	Free	
4 July 2022	GK	26	(Saudi Arabia) Mazyad Freeh	(Saudi Arabia) Al-Jabalain	Free	
18 July 2022	MF	11	(Netherlands) Mohamed Rayhi	(United Arab Emirates) Al-Dhafra	Free	
27 July 2022	DF	2	(Saudi Arabia) Omar Al-Owdah	(Saudi Arabia) Al-Khaleej	Free	
28 July 2022	DF	5	(Brazil) Renato Chaves	(Brazil) Juventude	Free	
29 July 2022	FW	9	(Angola) Fábio Abreu	(United Arab Emirates) Khor Fakkan	Free	
3 August 2022	MF	6	(Saudi Arabia) Abdulaziz Damdam	(Saudi Arabia) Al-Riyadh	Free	
9 August 2022	FW	15	(Saudi Arabia) Mohammed Al-Dhefiri	(Saudi Arabia) Al-Qaisumah	Free	
21 August 2022	MF	–	(Saudi Arabia) Zaid Al-Enezi	(Saudi Arabia) Al-Ahli	Free	
23 August 2022	DF	55	(Saudi Arabia) Masoud Al-Rubaie	(Saudi Arabia) Najran	Free	
24 August 2022	DF	–	(Iraq) Saad Natiq	(Saudi Arabia) Abha	Free	
26 August 2022	MF	8	(Saudi Arabia) Dhaifallah Al-Qarni	(Saudi Arabia) Al-Ain	Free	
31 August 2022	MF	–	(Saudi Arabia) Abdulaziz Al-Jebreen	(Saudi Arabia) Al-Raed	Free	
4 September 2022	MF	27	(Saudi Arabia) Abdulmajeed Obaid	(Saudi Arabia) Al-Kholood	Free	
8 January 2023	MF	10	(Netherlands) Youssef El Jebli	(Saudi Arabia) Ohod	Free	

== Pre-season ==
7 August 2022 Friendly	Al-Batin (Saudi Arabia)	0–1	(United Arab Emirates) Al-Bataeh	Sapanca, Turkey
18:30 TRT		Report	Abang	Stadium: Kırkpınar Stadyumu

12 August 2022 Friendly	Al-Batin (Saudi Arabia)	1–0	(Qatar) Al-Khor	Başiskele, Turkey
17:00 TRT	Y. Al-Shammari	Report		Stadium: Kullar Spor Tesisleri

19 August 2022 Friendly	Al-Batin (Saudi Arabia)	0–3	(Saudi Arabia) Al-Hilal	Riyadh, Saudi Arabia
AST		Report	Vietto; Ighalo,	Stadium: Al-Hilal Club Stadium

== Competitions ==
=== Overview ===
Competition	Record							
Competition	G	W	D	L	GF	GA	GD	Win %
Pro League	30	5	5	20	27	63	−36	16.67
King Cup	2	1	0	1	2	2	+0	50.00
Total	32	6	5	21	29	65	−36	18.75

Updated to match played 31 May 2023
Source: Competitions

=== Pro League ===
==== League table ====
Pos	Team	Pld	W	D	L	GF	GA	GD	Pts	Qualification or relegation
12	Abha	30	10	3	17	33	52	−19	33 (Note: Al-Fayha finished ahead of Abha on head-to-head points: Al-Fayha: 4 pts, Abha: 1 pts (Abha 1–1 Al-Fayha, Al-Fayha 2–0 Abha).)	
13	Al-Wehda	30	8	8	14	26	43	−17	32	
14	Al-Khaleej	30	9	4	17	30	44	−14	31	
15	Al-Adalah (R)	30	7	7	16	30	56	−26	28	Relegated to the First Division League
16	Al-Batin (R)	30	5	5	20	27	63	−36	20	Relegated to the First Division League

Updated to match(es) played on 31 May 2023. Source: SPL
Rules for classification: 1) Points; 2) Head-to-head points; 3) Head-to-head goal difference; 4) Total goal difference; 5) Total goals scored; 6) Fair-play points (Note: Head-to-head record is used only after all the matches between the teams in question have been played).
(R) Relegated

==== Results summary ====
Overall								Home						Away					
Pld	W	D	L	GF	GA	GD	Pts	W	D	L	GF	GA	GD	W	D	L	GF	GA	GD
30	5	5	20	27	63	−36	20	5	3	7	18	28	−10	0	2	13	9	35	−26

Last updated: 31 May 2023.
Source: spl.com.sa

==== Results by round ====
Round	1	2	3	4	5	6	7	8	9	10	11	12	13	14	15	16	17	18	19	20	21	22	23	24	25	26	27	28	29	30
Ground	A	H	A	H	A	H	A	H	A	H	A	A	H	A	H	H	A	H	A	H	A	H	A	H	A	H	H	A	H	A
Result	L	L	L	L	L	D	L	L	L	L	L	D	L	D	L	L	L	W	L	W	L	W	L	W	L	W	D	L	D	L
Position	15	16	16	16	16	16	16	16	16	16	16	16	16	16	16	16	16	16	16	16	16	16	16	16	16	16	16	16	16	16

Updated to match(es) played on 31 May 2023. Source: spl.com.sa
A = Away; H = Home; W = Win; D = Draw; L = Loss

==== Matches ====
All times are local, AST (UTC+3).

Win Draw Loss Postponed

26 August 2022 1	Al-Shabab	3–0	Al-Batin	Riyadh
21:00	Boupendza 22'; Carlos 48'; Mina 75'	Report	Al-Hurayji (yellow card) 68'	Stadium: Prince Faisal bin Fahd Stadium; Attendance: 6,041; Referee: Faisal Al-Blwi

31 August 2022 2	Al-Batin	0–5	Al-Fateh	Hafar al-Batin
18:55	Campaña (yellow card) 22' (yellow-red card) 22'; Al-Hurayji (yellow card) 77'	Report	Saâdane 17'; Batna 41', 62'; Bendebka (yellow card) 45'; Al-Fuhaid (yellow card) 47'; Petros 70'; Al-Buraikan 90+2'	Stadium: Al-Batin Club Stadium; Attendance: 3,984; Referee: Ahmed Al-Rumaikhani

9 September 2022 3	Al-Ettifaq	3–0	Al-Batin	Dammam
18:30	Al-Khateeb (yellow card) 45+5'; Vitinho 66'; Niakaté 88' (pen.); Al-Dhafiri 90+5' (o.g.)	Report	Al-Mutairi (yellow card) 33'; Nasser (yellow card) 87'; Naji (yellow card) 87'	Stadium: Prince Mohamed bin Fahd Stadium; Attendance: 2,608; Referee: Mamdouh Al Shahdan

15 September 2022 4	Al-Batin	0–4	Al-Nassr	Hafar al-Batin
18:40	Awad (yellow card) 28'; Saad (yellow card) 32'; Naji (yellow card) 44'	Report	Gustavo 17', (yellow card) 53'; Talisca 29'; Al-Najei 40'; Ghareeb 51'; Al-Sulaiheem (yellow card) 59'; Konan (yellow card) 90'	Stadium: Al-Batin Club Stadium; Attendance: 4,096; Referee: Roberto Tobar (Chile)

1 October 2022 5	Al-Khaleej	1–0	Al-Batin	Dammam
21:00	Al-Owdah (yellow card) 29'; Al-Hujaili (yellow card) 37'; Souza 90'; Al-Darwish (yellow card) 90+5'	Report	Mamdouh (yellow card) 45+2'; Y. Al-Shammari (yellow card) 55'; Fawaz (yellow card) 58'; Hariss (yellow card) 74'; Al-Shamlan (yellow card) 86'	Stadium: Prince Mohamed bin Fahd Stadium; Attendance: 2,367; Referee: Abdullah Al-Kharboush

6 October 2022 6	Al-Batin	2–2	Damac	Hafar al-Batin
21:00	Y. Al-Shammari 46', 88'; Al-Hurayji (yellow card) 53'; Saad (yellow card) 58'	Report	Soudani (yellow card) 38', (goal) 45+2', 69'; Al-Shamrani (yellow card) 49'	Stadium: Al-Batin Club Stadium; Attendance: 3,182; Referee: Mohammed Al-Hoaish

10 October 2022 7	Al-Wehda	2–0	Al-Batin	Mecca
20:30	Botía 42', (yellow card) 90+2'; Al-Eisa 56'	Report	Nasser (yellow card) 15'; Al-Hurayji (yellow card) 53'	Stadium: King Abdul Aziz Stadium; Attendance: 761; Referee: Abdulsamad Bakri

16 October 2022 8	Al-Batin	1–3	Abha	Hafar al-Batin
17:45	Nasser (yellow card) 59'; Awad (red card) 71'; Fawaz (yellow card) 74'; Al-Shamlan 80' (pen.); Fraih (yellow card) 90+3'	Report	Al-Amri 35'; Al-Zori (yellow card) 61'; Bguir 72'; Adam 74'; Al-Jumayah (yellow card) 79'	Stadium: Al-Batin Club Stadium; Attendance: 3,204; Referee: Sami Al-Jires

16 December 2022 9	Al-Hilal	3–1	Al-Batin	Riyadh
20:30	Hyun-soo (yellow card) 14', (goal) 48'; Abdulhamid (yellow card) 21'; Ighalo 79'; Carrillo 90+1'	Report	Saad (yellow card) 30'; Y. Al-Shammari (yellow card) 34'; Fawaz (yellow card) 45+6', (goal) 62'	Stadium: Prince Faisal bin Fahd Stadium; Attendance: 4,827; Referee: Sandro Schärer (Switzerland)

26 December 2022 10	Al-Batin	1–2	Al-Raed	Hafar al-Batin
15:30	Al-Mutairi (yellow card) 8'; Nasser (yellow card) 47'; Y. Al-Shammari 49'; Mamdouh (yellow card) 89'	Report	El Berkaoui 31'; M. Al-Dossari (yellow card) 42'; Mitriță 57'	Stadium: Al-Batin Club Stadium; Attendance: 3,194; Referee: Mamdouh Al Shahdan

31 December 2022 11	Al-Tai	4–0	Al-Batin	Ha'il
15:30	Dener 4'; Semedo 52'; Mbenza 56'; Sayoud 66'	Report		Stadium: Prince Abdul Aziz bin Musa'ed Stadium; Attendance: 5,584; Referee: Shukri Al-Hanfoush

7 January 2023 12	Al-Fayha	2–2	Al-Batin	Al Majma'ah
15:30	Paulinho 15', 38', (yellow card) 86'; Al Freej (yellow card) 64'	Report	Y. Al-Shammari 22', (yellow card) 65'; Al-Hurayji (yellow card) 51'; Nasser (yellow card) 68'; Roa 82'	Stadium: Al Majma'ah Sports City; Attendance: 2,176; Referee: Sultan Al-Okairy

14 January 2023 13	Al-Batin	1–2	Al-Ittihad	Hafar al-Batin
15:30	Y. Al-Shammari 23'; Pedroza (yellow card) 37' (yellow-red card) 45+6'; López (yellow card) 45+9'; Al-Hurayji (yellow card) 75'	Report	Hamdallah 45+8' (pen.); Al-Aboud (yellow card) 45+9'; Romarinho 50' (pen.)	Stadium: Al-Batin Club Stadium; Attendance: 3,494; Referee: Anastasios Sidiropoulos (Greece)

19 January 2023 14	Al-Adalah	1–1	Al-Batin	Al-Hasa
15:30	Tijanić 59'; Al-Hurib (yellow card) 90+6'	Report	Mudasiru (yellow card) 32'; Al-Qarni (yellow card) 58'; Al-Oufi 86' (o.g.)	Stadium: Prince Abdullah bin Jalawi Stadium; Attendance: 14,915; Referee: Abdullah Al-Kharbosh

2 February 2023 15	Al-Batin	0–1	Al-Taawoun	Hafar al-Batin
18:00	Al-Hurayji (yellow card) 53'; Al-Yousef (yellow card) 66'; Roa (yellow card) 67'; Antônio (yellow card) 71'	Report	Abdullah (yellow card) 31'; Hazazi (red card) 45+5'; Kadesh 90+2'	Stadium: Al-Batin Club Stadium; Attendance: 3,517; Referee: Majed Al-Shamrani

9 February 2023 16	Al-Batin	2–4	Al-Shabab	Hafar al-Batin
16:00	López 31'; Peyre (yellow card) 62'; Y. Al-Shammari 86'	Report	Guanca 45' (pen.), 45+6'; Banega 62' (pen.); Carlos 83'; Kanabah (yellow card) 90'; Santos (yellow card) 90+1'	Stadium: Al-Batin Club Stadium; Attendance: Abdullah Al-Shehri; Referee: 3,517

18 February 2023 17	Al-Fateh	2–0	Al-Batin	Al-Hasa
16:00	Saâdane 43' (pen.); Tello (yellow card) 57', (goal) 68'	Report	Y. Al-Shammari (yellow card) 57'	Stadium: Prince Abdullah bin Jalawi Stadium; Attendance: 11,938; Referee: Mohammed Al-Harbi

25 February 2023 18	Al-Batin	1–0	Al-Ettifaq	Hafar al-Batin
16:00	Al-Qarni (yellow card) 33'; López 41'; Al-Shamlan (yellow card) 90+3'	Report	Al-Mousa (yellow card) 86'	Stadium: Al-Batin Club Stadium; Attendance: 3,193; Referee: Ahmed Al-Rumaikhani

3 March 2023 19	Al-Nassr	3–1	Al-Batin	Riyadh
20:30	Maran (yellow card) 90', (goal) 90+14'; Ghareeb 90+3'; Al-Aqidi (yellow card) 90+8'; Al-Fatil 90+12'	Report	López 17', (yellow card) 63'; Campaña (yellow card) 42'; Al-Shamlan (yellow card) 45+1'; Mudasiru (yellow card) 86'	Stadium: Mrsool Park; Attendance: 22,782; Referee: Sami Al-Jires

9 March 2023 20	Al-Batin	1–0	Al-Khaleej	Hafar al-Batin
16:00	Y. Al-Shammari 5'; Al-Qarni (yellow card) 43'; López (yellow card) 90+2'	Report	Martins (yellow card) 83'	Stadium: Al-Batin Club Stadium; Attendance: 3,218; Referee: Faisal Al-Blwi

17 March 2023 21	Damac	1–0	Al-Batin	Khamis Mushait
16:00	Al-Ammar 6'; Nono (yellow card) 59'; Makin (yellow card) 87'; Chafaï (yellow card) 90+2'; Zeghba (yellow card) 90+10'	Report	Saad (yellow card) 90+9'; N. Al-Sohaymi (yellow card) 90+10'	Stadium: Damac Club Stadium; Attendance: 3,316; Referee: Mohammed Al-Esmaiel

5 April 2023 22	Al-Batin	2–0	Al-Wehda	Hafar al-Batin
22:00	López 20' (pen.); Fawaz (yellow card) 44'; Bukia 79'; Pedroza (yellow card) 90'	Report	Al Hejji (yellow card) 46'; Fajr (yellow card) 65'	Stadium: Al-Batin Club Stadium; Attendance: 3,208; Referee: Mohammed Abu Shaqarah

9 April 2023 23	Abha	3–2	Al-Batin	Abha
22:00	Al-Sadi 6', 77', (yellow card) 78'; Sami 42'; Atouchi (yellow card) 71'; Al-Zori (yellow card) 86'; Al-Omran (yellow card) 88'	Report	Al-Shamlan 38'; Al-Qarni (yellow card) 45'; Pedroza (yellow card) 51'; Saad 90+4'	Stadium: Prince Sultan bin Abdul Aziz Stadium; Attendance: 604; Referee: Mohammed Al-Harbi

14 April 2023 24	Al-Batin	1–0	Al-Hilal	Hafar al-Batin
22:00	López 47', (yellow card) 90+3'; Al-Yousef (yellow card) 50'; Campaña (yellow card) 90+6'	Report	Jahfali (yellow card) 38'; Al-Hadhood (yellow card) 51'; Marega (yellow card) 90+7'	Stadium: Al-Batin Club Stadium; Attendance: 3,517; Referee: Faisal Al-Blwi

2 May 2023 25	Al-Raed	3–1	Al-Batin	Buraidah
19:00	El Berkaoui 17' (pen.), 23', 28', (yellow card) 50'; Salem (yellow card) 45+4'; Fouzair (yellow card) 48'; Al-Dosari (yellow card) 82'	Report	Mudasiru (yellow card) 36'; Roa 39'; Lopez (yellow card) 45+1'	Stadium: King Abdullah Sport City Stadium; Attendance: 4,380; Referee: Majed Al-Shamrani

10 May 2023 26	Al-Batin	4–3	Al-Tai	Hafar al-Batin
19:00	Bukia (yellow card) 26'; Al-Hurayji (yellow card) 30'; López 45+3', 90+11' (pen.), (yellow card) 78'; Y. Al-Shammari 52'; Fawaz (yellow card) 86'; Roa 87'	Report	Sayoud 14'; Mbenza 18'; Musona 28' (pen.); Qassem (yellow card) 65'; Al-Jouei (yellow card) 73'; Dener (yellow card) 78'	Stadium: Al-Batin Club Stadium; Attendance: 3,217; Referee: Mohammed Al-Hoaish

15 May 2023 27	Al-Batin	0–0	Al-Fayha	Hafar al-Batin
19:00		Report	Al-Khaibari (yellow card) 90+6'	Stadium: Al-Batin Club Stadium; Attendance: 3,517; Referee: Sultan Al-Harbi

23 May 2023 28	Al-Ittihad	1–0	Al-Batin	Jeddah
21:30	Romarinho 9'; Henrique (yellow card) 90+2'	Report	Al-Hurayji (yellow card) 45+2'; Al-Qarni (yellow card) 45+5'; Pedroza (yellow card) 70'	Stadium: King Abdullah Sports City; Attendance: 54,771; Referee: Tamás Bognár (Hungary)

27 May 2023 29	Al-Batin	2–2	Al-Adalah	Hafar al-Batin
21:00	López 43'; N. Al-Sohaymi (yellow card) 55'; Y. Al-Shammari 67'; Saad (yellow card) 90+2'	Report	Tijanić 45+6'; Al-Hamdhi (yellow card) 88'; Lenis 90+15'	Stadium: Al-Batin Club Stadium; Attendance: 3,216; Referee: Faisal Al-Blwi

31 May 2023 30	Al-Taawoun	3–1	Al-Batin	Buraidah
21:00	El Mahdioui 38' (pen.); Tawamba 58'; Kadesh 72'; Darwish (yellow card) 90' (yellow-red card) 90+3'	Report	Al-Mutairi 41'	Stadium: Al-Taawoun Club Stadium; Attendance: 5,267; Referee: Turki Al-Hashlan

=== King Cup ===
All times are local, AST (UTC+3).

22 December 2022 Round of 16	Al-Batin	1–0	Al-Raed	Hafar al-Batin
15:30	Anwar (yellow card) 18'; Al-Shammari (yellow card) 24', (goal) 76'	Report	Al-Rajeh (yellow card) 74'	Stadium: Al-Batin Club Stadium; Referee: Abdullah Al-Shehri

14 March 2023 Quarter-finals	Al-Wehda	2–1	Al-Batin	Mecca
16:15	Bukhari (yellow card) 8'; Fajr 19' (pen.); Anselmo (yellow card) 43', (goal) 45+7'; Makki (yellow card) 45+2'	Report	Fawaz 39'; Nasser (yellow card) 43'; Al-Sohaymi (yellow card) 45+1'; Al-Qarni (yellow card) 82'	Stadium: King Abdul Aziz Stadium; Referee: Sultan Al-Harbi

== Statistics ==
=== Appearances ===
Last updated on 31 May 2023.

No.	Pos	Nat	Player	Total		Pro League		King Cup	
No.	Pos	Nat	Player	Apps	Goals	Apps	Goals	Apps	Goals
Goalkeepers
22	GK	(Saudi Arabia) KSA	Meshal Hariss	10	0	7+1	0	2	0
25	GK	(Uruguay) URU	Martín Campaña	23	0	23	0	0	0
26	GK	(Saudi Arabia) KSA	Falah Al-Shammeri	0	0	0	0	0	0
30	GK	(Saudi Arabia) KSA	Yazan Jari	0	0	0	0	0	0
32	GK	(Saudi Arabia) KSA	Hammad Al-Shammeri	0	0	0	0	0	0
Defenders
2	DF	(Saudi Arabia) KSA	Abdulkareem Al-Muziel	3	0	1+2	0	0	0
3	DF	(Saudi Arabia) KSA	Mohammad Naji	28	0	23+3	0	2	0
4	DF	(Brazil) BRA	Maurício Antônio	26	0	24+1	0	1	0
5	DF	(Sudan) SDN	Ibrahim Jamal	9	0	1+7	0	0+1	0
13	DF	(Saudi Arabia) KSA	Abdullah Al-Yousef	16	0	15+1	0	0	0
23	DF	(France) FRA	Thibault Peyre	6	0	6	0	0	0
24	DF	(Saudi Arabia) KSA	Saqr Mamdouh	10	0	7+3	0	0	0
29	DF	(Saudi Arabia) KSA	Bader Nasser	22	0	16+4	0	2	0
33	DF	(Saudi Arabia) KSA	Faisal Abu Bakr	3	0	0+2	0	1	0
42	DF	(Saudi Arabia) KSA	Aqeel Al-Dhefiri	0	0	0	0	0	0
43	DF	(Saudi Arabia) KSA	Ali Al-Shammari	0	0	0	0	0	0
Midfielders
6	MF	(Saudi Arabia) KSA	Bassam Al-Hurayji	29	0	27+1	0	1	0
7	MF	(Saudi Arabia) KSA	Yousef Al-Shammari	28	10	25+1	9	1+1	1
8	MF	(Colombia) COL	Sebastián Pedroza	18	0	17	0	0+1	0
10	MF	(Colombia) COL	Andrés Felipe Roa	15	3	10+5	3	0	0
11	MF	(Democratic Republic of the Congo) COD	André Bukia	17	1	15+1	1	0+1	0
14	MF	(Saudi Arabia) KSA	Othman Awadh	9	0	6+2	0	0+1	0
15	MF	(Saudi Arabia) KSA	Hassan Ghazwani	5	0	1+3	0	1	0
17	MF	(Saudi Arabia) KSA	Yahya Al-Qarni	15	0	9+5	0	0+1	0
18	MF	(Saudi Arabia) KSA	Mohammed Fraih	12	0	10+1	0	1	0
20	MF	(Saudi Arabia) KSA	Tariq Al-Mutairi	17	1	8+7	1	2	0
21	MF	(Saudi Arabia) KSA	Abdulelah Al-Barrih	11	0	2+8	0	1	0
37	MF	(Saudi Arabia) KSA	Turki Al-Dhefiri	5	0	0+5	0	0	0
40	MF	(Saudi Arabia) KSA	Abdullah Hakami	1	0	0+1	0	0	0
41	MF	(Saudi Arabia) KSA	Mohammed Taisir	5	0	0+4	0	0+1	0
44	MF	(Saudi Arabia) KSA	Abdulsalam Al-Ameri	0	0	0	0	0	0
46	MF	(Saudi Arabia) KSA	Omar Satam	0	0	0	0	0	0
70	MF	(Saudi Arabia) KSA	Rakan Al-Shamlan	18	2	11+6	2	0+1	0
88	MF	(Saudi Arabia) KSA	Jathob Al-Dhefiri	1	0	0+1	0	0	0
90	MF	(Ghana) GHA	Salifu Mudasiru	16	0	12+3	0	1	0
94	MF	(Saudi Arabia) KSA	Nawaf Al-Sohaymi	17	0	9+7	0	1	0
Forwards
19	FW	(Saudi Arabia) KSA	Abdulrahman Saad	18	1	10+6	1	2	0
31	FW	(Uruguay) URU	Renzo López	18	8	18	8	0	0
45	FW	(Saudi Arabia) KSA	Abdulrahman Anwar	6	0	3+2	0	1	0
77	FW	(Saudi Arabia) KSA	Yousef Fawaz	24	2	14+8	1	2	1

=== Goalscorers ===
Rank	No.	Pos	Nat	Name	Pro League	King Cup	Total
1	7	MF	(Saudi Arabia)	Yousef Al-Shammari	9	1	10
2	31	FW	(Uruguay)	Renzo López	8	0	8
3	10	MF	(Colombia)	Andrés Felipe Roa	3	0	3
4	70	MF	(Saudi Arabia)	Rakan Al-Shamlan	2	0	2
4	77	FW	(Saudi Arabia)	Yousef Fawaz	1	1	2
6	11	MF	(Democratic Republic of the Congo)	André Bukia	1	0	1
6	19	FW	(Saudi Arabia)	Abdulrahman Saad	1	0	1
6	20	MF	(Saudi Arabia)	Tariq Al-Mutairi	1	0	1
Own goal					1	0	1
Total					27	2	29

Last Updated: 31 May 2023

=== Assists ===
Rank	No.	Pos	Nat	Name	Pro League	King Cup	Total
1	8	MF	(Colombia)	Juan Pedroza	2	0	2
1	11	MF	(Democratic Republic of the Congo)	André Bukia	2	0	2
1	18	MF	(Saudi Arabia)	Mohammed Fraih	1	1	2
1	21	MF	(Saudi Arabia)	Abdulelah Al-Barrih	1	1	2
1	31	FW	(Uruguay)	Renzo López	2	0	2
1	45	FW	(Saudi Arabia)	Abdulrahman Anwar	2	0	2
1	70	MF	(Saudi Arabia)	Rakan Al-Shamlan	2	0	2
1	94	MF	(Saudi Arabia)	Nawaf Al-Sohaymi	2	0	2
9	6	MF	(Saudi Arabia)	Bassam Al-Hurayji	1	0	1
9	10	MF	(Colombia)	Andrés Felipe Roa	1	0	1
9	13	DF	(Saudi Arabia)	Abdullah Al-Yousef	1	0	1
9	17	MF	(Saudi Arabia)	Yahya Al-Qarni	1	0	1
9	77	FW	(Saudi Arabia)	Yousef Fawaz	1	0	1
Total					19	2	21

Last Updated: 27 May 2023

=== Clean sheets ===
Rank	No.	Pos	Nat	Name	Pro League	King Cup	Total
1	25	GK	(Uruguay)	Martín Campaña	5	0	5
2	22	GK	(Saudi Arabia)	Meshal Hariss	0	1	1
Total					5	1	6

Last Updated: 15 May 2023
