= 2021–22 Al-Batin FC season =

Al-Batin
2021–22 season
- President: Nasser Al-Huwaidi
- Manager: Nenad Lalatović (until 17 October); Alen Horvat (from 21 October)
- Stadium: Al-Batin Club Stadium
- SPL: 13th
- King Cup: Quarter-finals (knocked out by Al-Fayha)
- Top goalscorer: League: Fábio Abreu (9 goals); All: Fábio Abreu (10 goals)
- Highest home attendance: 4,238 (vs. Al-Hazem, 27 November 2021)
- Lowest home attendance: 1,102 (vs. Abha, 20 August 2021)
- Average home league attendance: 3,015
- All statistics correct as of 27 June 2022.

The 2021–22 season was Al-Batin's 43rd year in their existence and the fifth non-consecutive season in the Pro League. The club participated in the Pro League and the King Cup.

The season covered the period from 1 July 2021 to 30 June 2022.

== Players ==
=== Squad information ===
As of 1 February 2022

Note: Flags indicate national team as defined under FIFA eligibility rules; some limited exceptions apply. Players may hold more than one non-FIFA nationality.

No.	Pos.	Nation	Player
1	GK	KSA	Hani Al-Nahedh
2	DF	KSA	Omar Al-Owdah
3	DF	KSA	Mohammad Naji
4	DF	BRA	Maurício Antônio
5	DF	BRA	Renato Chaves
6	MF	KSA	Abdulaziz Damdam
7	FW	KSA	Yousef Al-Shammari
8	MF	KSA	Dhaifallah Al-Qarni
9	FW	ANG	Fábio Abreu
10	MF	NED	Youssef El Jebli
11	MF	NED	Mohamed Rayhi
13	DF	KSA	Eisa Zayed
14	MF	KSA	Mohammed Al-Qarni (on loan from Al-Wehda)
17	MF	KSA	Bassam Al-Hurayji
18	MF	KSA	Mohammed Fraih
20	FW	KSA	Abdulaziz Al-Aryani (on loan from Al-Ittihad)

No.	Pos.	Nation	Player
21	MF	KSA	Zakaria Sami
22	GK	KSA	Meshal Huriss
24	DF	KSA	Saqr Mamdouh
25	GK	URU	Martín Campaña
26	GK	KSA	Mazyad Freeh (captain)
27	MF	KSA	Abdulmajeed Obaid
28	MF	KSA	Hussain Al-Eisa (on loan from Al-Wehda)
29	DF	KSA	Bader Nasser
31	MF	KSA	Tariq Al-Mutairi
37	MF	KSA	Turki Mohammed
50	DF	KSA	Abdulaziz Al-Alawi (on loan from Al-Nassr)
55	DF	KSA	Masoud Al-Rubaie
56	FW	KSA	Abdulrahman Saad
70	MF	KSA	Rakan Al-Shamlan
80	MF	KSA	Othman Awadh

=== Out on loan ===
Note: Flags indicate national team as defined under FIFA eligibility rules; some limited exceptions apply. Players may hold more than one non-FIFA nationality.

No. / Pos. / Nation / Player; 15 / FW / KSA / Mohammed Al-Dhefiri (at Ohod until 30 June 2022)	No. / Pos. / Nation / Player; 77 / FW / KSA / Hassan Sharahili (at Al-Jabalain until 30 June 2022)

== Transfers and loans ==
=== Transfers in ===
Entry date	Position	No.	Player	From club	Fee	Ref.
30 June 2021	DF	33	(Saudi Arabia) Sultan Al-Shammeri	(Saudi Arabia) Al-Nojoom	End of loan	
3 July 2021	DF	3	(Saudi Arabia) Mohammad Naji	(Saudi Arabia) Al-Fateh	Undisclosed	
6 July 2021	MF	19	(Ghana) Afriyie Acquah	(Turkey) Yeni Malatyaspor	Free	
10 July 2021	DF	4	(Brazil) Maurício Antônio	(Japan) Urawa Red Diamonds	Free	

=== Loans in ===
Start date	End date	Position	No.	Player	From club	Fee	Ref.
22 July 2021	End of season	FW	20	(Saudi Arabia) Abdulaziz Al-Aryani	(Saudi Arabia) Al-Ittihad	None	
1 August 2021	End of season	MF	28	(Saudi Arabia) Hussain Al-Eisa	(Saudi Arabia) Al-Wehda	None	
3 August 2021	End of season	MF	14	(Saudi Arabia) Mohammed Al-Qarni	(Saudi Arabia) Al-Wehda	None	
7 August 2021	End of season	DF	50	(Saudi Arabia) Abdulaziz Al-Alawi	(Saudi Arabia) Al-Nassr	None	

=== Transfers out ===
Exit date	Position	No.	Player	To club	Fee	Ref.
30 June 2021	DF	13	(Saudi Arabia) Naif Almas	(Saudi Arabia) Al-Nassr	End of loan	
30 June 2021	DF	50	(Saudi Arabia) Saad Al Khayri	(Saudi Arabia) Al-Ettifaq	End of loan	
30 June 2021	MF	18	(Saudi Arabia) Abdulmalek Al-Shammeri	(Saudi Arabia) Al-Shabab	End of loan	
30 June 2021	FW	14	(Saudi Arabia) Saleh Al Abbas	(Saudi Arabia) Al-Nassr	End of loan	
16 August 2021	DF	12	(Saudi Arabia) Hassan Raghfawi	(Saudi Arabia) Al-Kawkab	Free	
17 August 2021	DF	4	(Netherlands) Xandro Schenk	(Denmark) Vendsyssel	Free	
25 August 2021	DF	33	(Saudi Arabia) Sultan Al-Shammeri	(Saudi Arabia) Arar	Free	
15 September 2021	FW	16	(Saudi Arabia) Fahad Hadl	(Saudi Arabia) Al-Qaisumah	Free	
30 January 2022	MF	19	(Ghana) Afriyie Acquah		Released	

=== Loans out ===
Start date	End date	Position	No.	Player	To club	Fee	Ref.
9 September 2021	End of season	FW	77	(Saudi Arabia) Hassan Sharahili	(Saudi Arabia) Al-Jabalain	None	
13 January 2022	End of season	FW	15	(Saudi Arabia) Mohammed Al-Dhefiri	(Saudi Arabia) Ohod	None	

== Pre-season ==
24 July 2021 Friendly	Al-Batin (Saudi Arabia)	6–2	Egypt XI	Cairo, Egypt
17:30 EGY	Y. Al-Shammari, Al-Aryani, Acquah; Obaid	Report		Stadium: Mövenpick Hotel Stadium

27 July 2021 Friendly	Al-Batin (Saudi Arabia)	2–2	(Egypt) ENPPI	Cairo, Egypt
16:30 EGY	Chaves; Al-Aryani	Report		Stadium: Petro Sport Stadium

30 July 2021 Friendly	Al-Batin (Saudi Arabia)	1–1	(Egypt) Aswan	Cairo, Egypt
18:00 EGY	Chaves	Report	Magdi	Stadium: Ramage Hotel Stadium

2 August 2021 Friendly	Al-Batin (Saudi Arabia)	1–1	(Egypt) Misr Lel Makkasa	Cairo, Egypt
17:00 EGY	Y. Al-Shammari	Report	Goal	Stadium: Mövenpick Hotel Stadium

== Competitions ==
=== Overview ===
Competition	Record							
Competition	G	W	D	L	GF	GA	GD	Win %
Pro League	30	8	9	13	31	41	−10	26.67
King Cup	2	1	0	1	2	2	+0	50.00
Total	32	9	9	14	33	43	−10	28.13

Updated to match played 27 June 2022
Source: Competitions

=== Pro League ===
==== League table ====
Pos	Team	Pld	W	D	L	GF	GA	GD	Pts	Qualification or relegation
11	Al-Ettifaq	30	8	10	12	40	47	−7	34 (Note: Head-to-head points: Al-Ettifaq 3, Al-Taawoun 3. Head-to-head goal difference: Al-Ettifaq +2, Al-Taawoun –2.)	
12	Al-Taawoun	30	7	13	10	43	48	−5	34	
13	Al-Batin	30	8	9	13	31	41	−10	33 (Note: Head-to-head points: Al-Batin 4, Al-Faisaly 1.)	
14	Al-Faisaly (R)	30	7	12	11	28	37	−9	33	Relegation to MS League
15	Al-Ahli (R)	30	6	14	10	38	43	−5	32	Relegation to MS League

Source: spl.com
Rules for classification: 1) Points; 2) Head-to-head points; 3) Head-to-head goal difference; 4) Total goal difference; 5) Total goals scored; 6) Fair-play points (Note: Head-to-head record is used only after all the matches between the teams in question have been played).
(R) Relegated

==== Results summary ====
Overall								Home						Away					
Pld	W	D	L	GF	GA	GD	Pts	W	D	L	GF	GA	GD	W	D	L	GF	GA	GD
30	8	9	13	31	41	−10	33	6	5	4	20	19	+1	2	4	9	11	22	−11

Last updated: 27 June 2022.
Source: spl.com.sa

==== Results by round ====
Round	1	2	3	4	5	6	7	8	9	10	11	12	13	14	15	16	17	18	19	20	21	22	23	24	25	26	27	28	29	30
Ground	A	H	A	H	H	A	A	H	H	A	A	H	H	A	H	H	A	H	A	A	H	H	A	A	H	H	A	A	H	A
Result	L	W	D	L	D	L	D	L	W	L	L	W	D	D	L	D	L	D	W	L	L	W	L	L	W	D	L	W	W	D
Position	12	7	10	12	13	13	13	15	14	14	15	13	13	14	15	15	15	14	12	14	15	13	15	15	14	15	15	15	13	13

Updated to match(es) played on 27 June 2022. Source: spl.com.sa
A = Away; H = Home; W = Win; D = Draw; L = Loss

==== Matches ====
All times are local, AST (UTC+3).

Win Draw Loss Postponed

14 August 2021 1	Al-Ettifaq	2–1	Al-Batin	Dammam
18:55	Al Salem 9', 20'	Report	Sami (yellow card) 41'; El Jebli 50' (pen.); D. Al-Qarni (yellow card) 57'; Obaid (yellow card) 90+5'	Stadium: Prince Mohamed bin Fahd Stadium; Attendance: 907; Referee: Faisal Al-Blwi

20 August 2021 2	Al-Batin	2–1	Abha	Hafar al-Batin
19:05	El Jebli 16'; Rayhi (yellow card) 29'; Chaves (yellow card) 45+2'; Al-Shammari (yellow card) 72'; Abreu 90+5'	Report	Al-Qaydhi (yellow card) 21'; Amr (yellow card) 42'; Bguir (yellow card) 54'; Al-Jumayah (yellow card) 62' te Vrede (yellow card) 83'; Atouchi 89'	Stadium: Al-Batin Club Stadium; Attendance: 1,102; Referee: Sultan Al-Harbi

27 August 2021 3	Al-Hilal	0–0	Al-Batin	Riyadh
20:45	Marega (yellow card) 45+1'; Al-Faraj (yellow card) 51'	Report	Acquah (yellow card) 45+1'; Al-Rubaie (yellow card) 67'; Damdam (yellow card) 90+2'	Stadium: King Fahd International Stadium; Attendance: 11,457; Referee: Gery Vargas (Bolivia)

12 September 2021 4	Al-Batin	0–2	Al-Fateh	Hafar al-Batin
18:40	Acquah (yellow card) 18'; Naji (yellow card) 30'; M. Al-Qarni (yellow card) 45+3'; Al-Rubaie (yellow card) 56'	Report	Wikheim 21', 34'; Al-Fuhaid (yellow card) 31'; Buhimed (yellow card) 77'	Stadium: Al-Batin Club Stadium; Attendance: 2,645; Referee: Shukri Al-Hanfoush

16 September 2021 5	Al-Batin	0–0	Al-Tai	Hafar al-Batin
18:35	Sami (yellow card) 64'	Report	Marcelo (yellow card) 49'; Dener (yellow card) 56'; Sayoud (yellow card) 76'; Al-Jubairi (yellow card) 86'	Stadium: Al-Batin Club Stadium; Attendance: 2,014; Referee: Mohammed Al-Esmaiel

23 September 2021 6	Al-Nassr	1–0	Al-Batin	Riyadh
18:25	Madu (yellow card) 8'; Abdullah (yellow card) 16'; Talisca 34'; S. Al-Ghanam (yellow card) 90'	Report	Al-Rubaie (yellow card) 74'; Abreu (yellow card) 90+1'	Stadium: Mrsool Park; Attendance: 4,672; Referee: Ovidiu Hațegan (Romania)

1 October 2021 7	Al-Faisaly	2–2	Al-Batin	Al Majma'ah
18:25	Faik (yellow card) 6'; Tavares 52'; Kaabi 90+3'; Al-Saiari (yellow card) 90+5'	Report	Al-Shammari 7'; Al-Rubaie 66'; Mamdouh (yellow card) 84'; Acquah (yellow card) 85'; Campaña (yellow card) 88'; M. Al-Qarni (yellow card) 90+1'	Stadium: Al Majma'ah Sports City; Attendance: 3,812; Referee: Khaled Al-Juhani

16 October 2021 8	Al-Batin	0–3	Al-Shabab	Hafar al-Batin
18:00	Al-Alawi (yellow card) 27'; Abreu (yellow card) 38'	Report	Carlos 24'; Bahebri 29'; Al-Ammar (yellow card) 31'; Ighalo 72'	Stadium: Al-Batin Club Stadium; Attendance: 2,514; Referee: Sami Al-Jires

21 October 2021 9	Al-Batin	2–0	Al-Fayha	Hafar al-Batin
17:55	M. Al-Qarni (yellow card) 20'; Sami (yellow card) 26'; Al-Shammari 39'; Chaves 45+3'; Al-Hurayji (yellow card) 87'; Al-Alawi (yellow card) 90'	Report	Al-Rashidi (yellow card) 60'	Stadium: Al-Batin Club Stadium; Attendance: 4,228; Referee: Abdullah Al-Shehri

29 October 2021 10	Al-Raed	1–0	Al-Batin	Buraidah
18:05	Salem (yellow card) 55'; René (yellow card) 84'; El Berkaoui 90+3' (pen.)	Report	Al-Alawi (yellow card) 85'; Antônio (yellow card) 90+1'	Stadium: King Abdullah Sport City Stadium; Attendance: 1,454; Referee: Raed Al-Zahrani

3 November 2021 11	Al-Ahli	1–0	Al-Batin	Jeddah
19:45	Bradarić (yellow card) 57'; Antônio 66' (o.g.); Ghareeb (yellow card) 84'	Report	Chaves (yellow card) 61'	Stadium: Prince Abdullah Al-Faisal Stadium; Attendance: 14,497; Referee: Faisal Al-Blwi

21 November 2021 12	Al-Batin	3–2	Al-Taawoun	Hafar al-Batin
17:40	M. Al-Qarni (yellow card) 9'; Sami 12'; Rayhi 26'; Santos 60' (o.g.); Al-Shammari (yellow card) 69'; Campaña (yellow card) 90+4'	Report	Luvannor 43' (pen.); Al-Rashidi 66'; Santos (yellow card) 85'; Amissi (yellow card) 88'	Stadium: Al-Batin Club Stadium; Attendance: 4,087; Referee: Khamis Al-Marri (Qatar)

27 November 2021 13	Al-Batin	0–0	Al-Hazem	Hafar al-Batin
15:00		Report	Al-Juwaid (yellow card) 61'; Neris (yellow card) 67'; Abdullah S. (yellow card) 77'	Stadium: Al-Batin Club Stadium; Attendance: 4,238; Referee: Mohammed Al-Hoaish

25 December 2021 14	Damac	1–1	Al-Batin	Abha
15:40	Chaves 15' (o.g.); Soudani (yellow card) 22'; Caktaš (yellow card) 25'; Augusto (yellow card) 90'	Report	Abreu 88'	Stadium: Prince Sultan bin Abdul Aziz Stadium; Attendance: 825; Referee: Majed Al-Shamrani

31 December 2021 15	Al-Batin	2–3	Al-Ittihad	Hafar al-Batin
15:10	Antônio 5'; Abreu (yellow card) 28'; Nasser (yellow card) 51'; Rayhi 83', (yellow card) 84'	Report	Antônio 8' (o.g.); Al-Aboud (yellow card) 37'; Naji 72' (o.g.); Camara 90+3'	Stadium: Al-Batin Club Stadium; Attendance: 2,760; Referee: Sami Al-Jires

7 January 2022 16	Al-Batin	0–0	Al-Ettifaq	Hafar al-Batin
15:20	M. Al-Qarni (yellow card) 18'; El Jebli (yellow card) 58'	Report	Abdellaoui (yellow card) 71'; Al-Rubaie (yellow card) 90+1'	Stadium: Al-Batin Club Stadium; Attendance: 2,300; Referee: Khaled Al-Teris

14 January 2022 17	Abha	1–0	Al-Batin	Abha
15:50	Atouchi (yellow card) 33'; Afaneh (yellow card) 50'; Sharahili 90+5', (yellow card) 90+6'; Al-Habib (yellow card) 90+6'	Report	Al-Alawi (yellow card) 38'; Al-Mutairi (yellow card) 90+6'	Stadium: Prince Sultan bin Abdul Aziz Stadium; Attendance: 425; Referee: Faisal Al-Blwi

21 January 2022 18	Al-Batin	1–1	Al-Hilal	Hafar al-Batin
15:30	Abreu 31'; Sami (yellow card) 39'; Chaves (yellow card) 53'; D. Al-Qarni (yellow card) 59'	Report	Gomis 54' (pen.)	Stadium: Al-Batin Club Stadium; Attendance: 2,300; Referee: Mohammed Al-Hoaish

6 February 2022 19	Al-Fateh	2–3	Al-Batin	Al-Hasa
18:05	Al-Buraikan 22'; Al-Fuhaid (yellow card) 32'; Batna 34', (yellow card) 87'	Report	El Jebli 4'; Abreu 6'; M. Al-Qarni (yellow card) 30'; Rayhi 45+1'; Al-Hurayji (yellow card) 50' (yellow-red card) 80'; Campaña (yellow card) 86'	Stadium: Prince Abdullah bin Jalawi Stadium; Attendance: 5,241; Referee: Majed Al-Shamrani

12 February 2022 20	Al-Tai	3–1	Al-Batin	Ha'il
16:00	Al-Jubairi (yellow card) 42'; Bajandouh 55'; Figueroa 72'; Malele 90+3'	Report	Al-Shamlan (yellow card) 48'; Antônio 69', (yellow card) 90+5'; Rayhi (yellow card) 90+2'	Stadium: Prince Abdul Aziz bin Musa'ed Stadium; Attendance: 3,036; Referee: Sultan Al-Harbi

17 February 2022 21	Al-Batin	3–4	Al-Nassr	Hafar al-Batin
15:45	Naji (yellow card) 20'; Abreu 33' (pen.), 79' (pen.); Sami (yellow card) 67', (goal) 81'; Al-Eisa (yellow card) 70'	Report	Aboubakar 4'; Al-Sulaiheem 24'; K. Al-Ghannam (yellow card) 45', (goal) 68'; Al-Khaibari (yellow card) 78'; Martínez 90+1' (pen.)	Stadium: Al-Batin Club Stadium; Attendance: 2,300; Referee: César Ramos (Mexico)

27 February 2022 22	Al-Batin	1–0	Al-Faisaly	Hafar al-Batin
15:50	M. Al-Qarni (yellow card) 22'; El Jebli 45+3'	Report	Qassem (yellow card) 57'; Al-Ahmed (yellow card) 60'; Assiri (yellow card) 90+7' (yellow-red card) 90+7'	Stadium: Al-Batin Club Stadium; Attendance: 2,127; Referee: Faisal Al-Blwi

5 March 2022 23	Al-Shabab	4–0	Al-Batin	Riyadh
20:45	Al-Ammar 2'; Al-Alawi 35' (o.g.); Sharahili (yellow card) 36'; Al-Harbi (yellow card) 52'; Paulinho 66'; Banega 79' (pen.); Shae'an (yellow card) 85'	Report	Chaves (yellow card) 39'; M. Al-Qarni (yellow card) 55'	Stadium: Prince Faisal bin Fahd Stadium; Attendance: 3,099; Referee: Abdullah Al-Shehri

11 March 2022 24	Al-Fayha	1–0	Al-Batin	Al Majma'ah
18:45	Lopes (yellow card) 59'; Al-Torais 85'	Report	Al-Aryani (red card) 33'	Stadium: Al Majma'ah Sports City; Attendance: 6,191; Referee: Mohammed Al-Beredi

19 March 2022 25	Al-Batin	2–0	Al-Raed	Hafar al-Batin
18:45	Rayhi (yellow card) 41', (goal) 90+6'; Naji (yellow card) 60'; Sami (yellow card) 62'; Abreu 69' (pen.)	Report		Stadium: Al-Batin Club Stadium; Attendance: 4,185; Referee: Andris Treimanis (Latvia)

5 May 2022 26	Al-Batin	2–2	Al-Ahli	Hafar al-Batin
20:50	Abreu 29' (pen.); M. Al-Qarni (yellow card) 70'; Al-Aryani 78'; Al-Shammari (yellow card) 90+6'	Report	A. Majrashi (yellow card) 18'; Kom (yellow card) 46'; Al-Asmari (yellow card) 55'; Eduardo 65'; Alioski (yellow card) 83'; Asiri 85'	Stadium: Al-Batin Club Stadium; Attendance: 4,199; Referee: Aleksei Kulbakov (Belarus)

12 May 2022 27	Al-Taawoun	1–0	Al-Batin	Buraidah
19:20	Tawamba 10'; El Mahdioui (yellow card) 36'; Al-Nabit (yellow card) 47'; Medrán (yellow card) 90+4'	Report	Al-Shammari (yellow card) 32'; Sami (yellow card) 79'	Stadium: King Abdullah Sport City Stadium; Attendance: 3,406; Referee: István Kovács (Romania)

27 May 2022 28	Al-Hazem	2–3	Al-Batin	Ar Rass
19:25	Al-Dakheel (red card) 4'; John 48'; Neris (yellow card) 61'; Zerhouni 80'	Report	Sami (yellow card) 18'; Chaves (yellow card) 34'; Abreu (yellow card) 62', (goal) 65'; Fawaz 87', 90'; Antônio (yellow card) 90+7'	Stadium: Al-Hazem Club Stadium; Attendance: 736; Referee: Mohammed Al-Qarni

23 June 2022 29	Al-Batin	2–1	Damac	Hafar al-Batin
21:00	Rayhi 12' (pen.); Al-Shammari 30'	Report	Nono 6', (yellow card) 90+2'	Stadium: Al-Batin Club Stadium; Attendance: 4,221; Referee: Sultan Al-Harbi

27 June 2022 30	Al-Ittihad	0–0	Al-Batin	Jeddah
21:00	Henrique (yellow card) 71'	Report	Chaves (yellow card) 36'; Al-Eisa (yellow card) 40'; Al-Shamlan (yellow card) 45+6'; Abreu (yellow card) 74'; Al-Hurayji (yellow card) 90+2'	Stadium: King Abdullah Sports City; Attendance: 29,900; Referee: Carlos del Cerro Grande (Spain)

=== King Cup ===
All times are local, AST (UTC+3).

20 December 2021 Round of 16	Al-Batin	1–0	Al-Hazem	Hafar al-Batin
15:05	Nasser (yellow card) 70'; Al-Shammari (yellow card) 90+4'; Abreu 90+5'	Report	Al-Obaid (yellow card) 56'; Abdullah S. (yellow card) 58'	Stadium: Al-Batin Club Stadium; Referee: Mohammed Al-Esmaiel

21 February 2022 Quarter-finals	Al-Batin	1–2	Al-Fayha	Hafar al-Batin
15:55	El Jebli 66' (pen.); Sami (yellow card) 72'; Antônio (yellow card) 77'; Campaña (yellow card) 116'	Report	Trajkovski 56'; Bamsaud (yellow card) 70'; Al-Baqawi (yellow card) 94'; Tachtsidis 117'	Stadium: Al-Batin Club Stadium; Referee: Raed Al-Zahrani

== Statistics ==
=== Appearances ===
Last updated on 27 June 2022.

No.	Pos	Nat	Player	Total		Pro League		King Cup	
No.	Pos	Nat	Player	Apps	Goals	Apps	Goals	Apps	Goals
Goalkeepers
1	GK	(Saudi Arabia) KSA	Hani Al-Nahedh	0	0	0	0	0	0
22	GK	(Saudi Arabia) KSA	Meshal Huriss	0	0	0	0	0	0
25	GK	(Uruguay) URU	Martín Campaña	31	0	29	0	2	0
26	GK	(Saudi Arabia) KSA	Mazyad Freeh	1	0	1	0	0	0
Defenders
2	DF	(Saudi Arabia) KSA	Omar Al-Owdah	2	0	1+1	0	0	0
3	DF	(Saudi Arabia) KSA	Mohammad Naji	25	0	20+4	0	1	0
4	DF	(Brazil) BRA	Maurício Antônio	31	2	29	2	2	0
5	DF	(Brazil) BRA	Renato Chaves	31	1	29	1	2	0
13	DF	(Saudi Arabia) KSA	Eisa Zayed	0	0	0	0	0	0
24	DF	(Saudi Arabia) KSA	Saqr Mamdouh	9	0	4+5	0	0	0
29	DF	(Saudi Arabia) KSA	Bader Nasser	11	0	9+1	0	1	0
50	DF	(Saudi Arabia) KSA	Abdulaziz Al-Alawi	14	0	10+3	0	0+1	0
55	DF	(Saudi Arabia) KSA	Masoud Al-Rubaie	7	1	5+1	1	1	0
Midfielders
6	MF	(Saudi Arabia) KSA	Abdulaziz Damdam	6	0	2+4	0	0	0
8	MF	(Saudi Arabia) KSA	Dhaifallah Al-Qarni	6	0	4+2	0	0	0
10	MF	(Netherlands) NED	Youssef El Jebli	26	5	22+2	4	2	1
11	MF	(Netherlands) NED	Mohamed Rayhi	31	5	29	5	2	0
14	MF	(Saudi Arabia) KSA	Mohammed Al-Qarni	28	0	23+3	0	2	0
17	MF	(Saudi Arabia) KSA	Bassam Al-Hurayji	7	0	3+4	0	0	0
18	MF	(Saudi Arabia) KSA	Mohammed Fraih	1	0	0+1	0	0	0
21	MF	(Saudi Arabia) KSA	Zakaria Sami	29	2	25+2	2	2	0
27	MF	(Saudi Arabia) KSA	Abdulmajeed Obaid	14	0	2+11	0	0+1	0
28	MF	(Saudi Arabia) KSA	Hussain Al-Eisa	28	0	15+11	0	1+1	0
31	MF	(Saudi Arabia) KSA	Tariq Al-Mutairi	0	0	0	0	0	0
37	MF	(Saudi Arabia) KSA	Turki Mohammed	0	0	0	0	0	0
70	MF	(Saudi Arabia) KSA	Rakan Al-Shamlan	18	0	9+8	0	1	0
80	MF	(Saudi Arabia) KSA	Othman Awadh	0	0	0	0	0	0
87	MF	(Saudi Arabia) KSA	Yousef Fawaz	1	2	0+1	2	0	0
Forwards
7	FW	(Saudi Arabia) KSA	Yousef Al-Shammari	27	3	20+5	3	2	0
9	FW	(Angola) ANG	Fábio Abreu	30	10	28	9	1+1	1
20	FW	(Saudi Arabia) KSA	Abdulaziz Al-Aryani	20	1	4+14	1	0+2	0
56	FW	(Saudi Arabia) KSA	Abdulrahman Saad	0	0	0	0	0	0
Players sent out on loan this season
15	FW	(Saudi Arabia) KSA	Mohammed Al-Dhefiri	2	0	0+2	0	0	0
77	FW	(Saudi Arabia) KSA	Hassan Sharahili	1	0	0+1	0	0	0
Player who made an appearance this season but have left the club
16	FW	(Saudi Arabia) KSA	Fahad Hadl	1	0	0+1	0	0	0
19	MF	(Ghana) GHA	Afriyie Acquah	8	0	7+1	0	0	0

=== Goalscorers ===
Rank	No.	Pos	Nat	Name	Pro League	King Cup	Total
1	9	FW	(Angola)	Fábio Abreu	9	1	10
2	10	MF	(Netherlands)	Youssef El Jebli	4	1	5
2	11	MF	(Netherlands)	Mohamed Rayhi	5	0	5
4	7	FW	(Saudi Arabia)	Yousef Al-Shammari	3	0	3
5	4	DF	(Brazil)	Maurício Antônio	2	0	2
5	21	MF	(Saudi Arabia)	Zakaria Sami	2	0	2
5	87	MF	(Saudi Arabia)	Yousef Fawaz	2	0	2
8	5	DF	(Brazil)	Renato Chaves	1	0	1
8	20	FW	(Saudi Arabia)	Abdulaziz Al-Aryani	1	0	1
8	55	DF	(Saudi Arabia)	Masoud Al-Rubaie	1	0	1
Own goal					1	0	1
Total					31	2	33

Last Updated: 23 June 2022

=== Assists ===
Rank	No.	Pos	Nat	Name	Pro League	King Cup	Total
1	10	MF	(Netherlands)	Youssef El Jebli	3	0	3
1	28	MF	(Saudi Arabia)	Hussain Al-Eisa	3	0	3
3	20	FW	(Saudi Arabia)	Abdulaziz Al-Aryani	2	0	2
4	3	DF	(Saudi Arabia)	Mohammad Naji	1	0	1
4	4	DF	(Brazil)	Maurício Antônio	1	0	1
4	8	MF	(Saudi Arabia)	Dhaifallah Al-Qarni	1	0	1
4	11	MF	(Netherlands)	Mohamed Rayhi	1	0	1
4	14	MF	(Saudi Arabia)	Mohammed Al-Qarni	0	1	1
4	21	MF	(Saudi Arabia)	Zakaria Sami	1	0	1
4	50	DF	(Saudi Arabia)	Abdulaziz Al-Alawi	1	0	1
4	70	MF	(Saudi Arabia)	Rakan Al-Shamlan	1	0	1
Total					15	1	16

Last Updated: 23 June 2022

=== Clean sheets ===
Rank	No.	Pos	Nat	Name	Pro League	King Cup	Total
1	25	GK	(Uruguay)	Martín Campaña	8	1	9
Total					8	1	9

Last Updated: 27 June 2022
