= King Khalid Military City =

Fortified city

- مدينة الملك خالد العسكرية
- Hafar al-Batin in Saudi Arabia
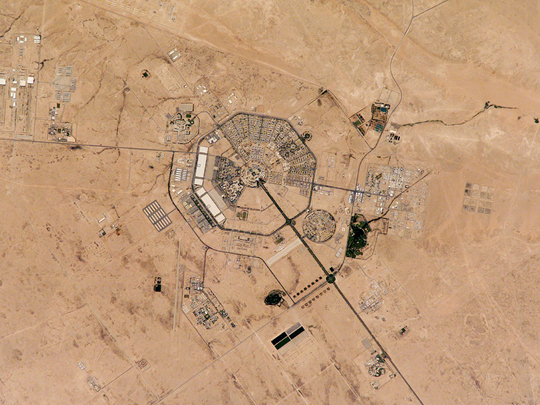
- Satellite photo of King Khalid Military City, captured on June 30, 2002

Site information
- Type: Military city, cantonment
- Owner: Saudi Arabian Ministry of Defense
- Operator: Saudi Arabian Armed Forces
- Controlled by: Saudi Arabian Army
- Open to the public: No
- Condition: Active
- Website: KKMC Information

Location
- Coordinates: 27°58′55″N 45°32′41″E
- Area: Large military installation

Site history
- Built: 1976 – 1987
- Built for: Saudi Arabian Army
- Built by: United States Army Corps of Engineers
- In use: 1976–present
- Materials: Concrete, steel, precast materials
- Fate: Still in operation
- Battles/wars: Gulf War
- Events: Built with United States Army Corps of Engineers' assistance

Garrison information
- Garrison: Saudi Army
- Occupants: Saudi military personnel, former United States Army Corps of Engineers personnel

King Khalid Military City (KKMC) (Arabic: مدينة الملك خالد العسكرية; transliterated: Medinat Al-Malek Khaled Al-Askariyah) is a cantonment located in northeastern Saudi Arabia, approximately 60 km (37 miles) south of Hafar al-Batin city. The city was constructed during the 1970s and 1980s and was designed and built by the Middle East Division, a unit of the United States Army Corps of Engineers. Consulting firms involved in its construction include Brown, Daltas, and Associates, as well as LeMessurier Consultants from Cambridge, Massachusetts.

KKMC was established to accommodate several brigades of Saudi troops, with a population of approximately 65,000 individuals. The city is named after the former Saudi King Khalid bin Abdul Aziz (r. 1975–1982).

== Construction ==
In 1964, the Saudi Minister of Defense and Aviation, Prince Sultan, expressed anticipation for three cantonments. King Faisal Military Cantonment in Khamis Mushait was planned in the southwest, near the border with Yemen. King Abdul Aziz Military Cantonment (later renamed "King Abdulaziz Military City") was planned in Tabuk Province, in the northwest, near the border with Jordan. In 1973, the Ministry approved changing the site of the third cantonment from Qaysumah to Hafar al-Batin in the north, near the border with Iraq.

The Engineer Assistance Agreement, effective May 24, 1965, and extended several times, provides the basic framework for many Corps activities in Saudi Arabia. The Agreement was entered into pursuant to section 507(a) of the U.S. Foreign Assistance Act of 1961, and is currently authorized by section 22 of the Arms Export Act with the Ministry of Defense and Aviation (MODA) further committing the (Mediterranean Division, later the Middle East Division) US Army Corps of Engineers, initially to design and construct three brigade-size military cantonments to house elements of the Saudi Arabian Army. In the spring of 1973, MODA approved changing the location of the third cantonment from Qaysumah to Hafar al Batin and expanding the cantonment to a "Military City". In March 1974, a $1.5 million contract was awarded to a joint venture with Sippican Architectural Engineering and Brown Daltas & Associates Rome, Italy office. Over the next 13 months, the joint venture surveyed the location. Without estimates of the City's population, the venture identified the architectural theme, required utilities, buildings, and facilities to MODA in May 1975 with a one brigade troop strength. Prince Sultan, head of MODA, approved the outline and concept and added two more brigade troop strength of 5000 men each. The growing demand for construction created a need to import vast quantities of construction materials and labor.

The region had limited capabilities for dealing with the inflow of goods and workers. When construction began at Khamis Mushayt in 1966, strained Saudi port facilities had barely coped. Nothing had improved by the mid-1970s. U.S. Corps personnel became increasingly concerned about Saudi Arabia’s ports' limited ability to handle the shipping volume needed to sustain the large construction projects under design. As serious discussions began concerning the construction of the cantonment at Hafar al-Batin, the military academy, and the medical research and treatment center at Al Kharj, the division’s engineers again voiced their concern about port capacity. In late 1974, the division commissioned a study of the port conditions and the transportation facilities needed to support the planned programs. In mid-November 1975, U.S. Corps personnel presented to Prince Sultan the idea of constructing a port on the Saudi east coast at Ra's al Mish'ab near the border with Kuwait. The port would handle only materials imported for the al Batin. In June 1975, tentative approval of a $9 million contract for further design of procurement packages for the City. In the first week of January 1976, MODA named the new city King Khalid Military City in honor of Saudi King Khalid.

Planning for the city began in 1974, and construction commenced after the establishment of a new Persian Gulf port in Ra's al-Mish'ab to handle all the materials being transported. Built in collaboration with local national engineers and project managers, various project phases were completed throughout the 1980s. The project scope was extensive, involving the drilling of 21 new wells to provide water, the establishment of a new port for supplies, the construction of 3,387 double-story family housing units with utility tunnels, and the erection of five multi-domed mosques and associated facilities. Additionally, the world's largest pre-cast concrete plant, built on-site, was utilized and constructed by the Samwhan Corporation. The city was finally completed in 1987.

== Gulf War ==
During the Gulf War, KKMC served as a housing facility for thousands of American and coalition soldiers. Its airport, the King Khaled Military City Airport, was among the most utilized during combat operations, alongside bases in Dhahran and Riyadh, Saudi Arabia.

Throughout the conflict, KKMC was shielded from ballistic missiles by the U.S.'s Patriot missile system. On February 21, 1991, Iraq launched three Scud missiles at King Khalid Military City, which were reportedly neutralized by Patriot interceptors.

== Present use ==
At its peak, hundreds of US Army Corps engineers and personnel called KKMC home, and within the Saudi military city, a small American community emerged. Today, the US presence at KKMC is minimal, with only a handful of US government personnel still working and residing there, alongside a small number of foreigners from various countries like South Africa, Sudan, Egypt, India, Pakistan, Tunisia, Philippines, Morocco, Algeria, etc. who also work there. Many expatriates reside in the city, with some even born there.

== See also ==
- List of things named after Saudi kings
- Military of Saudi Arabia
- Royal Saudi Air Force
- List of military installations in Saudi Arabia
- King Khalid Military College

== External links and sources ==
=== External links ===
- Short history on KKMC
- Report on the Middle East Division

=== Sources ===
- Samwhan Corp. site
- Department of Defense report on Iraq's use of scud missiles
