= Meshal Hariss =

Saudi Arabian footballer

Personal information
- Full name: Meshal Hariss Al-Shammari
- Date of birth: 22 November 1996 (age 29)
- Place of birth: Saudi Arabia
- Height: 1.75 m (5 ft 9 in)
- Position: Goalkeeper

Team information
- Current team: Al-Jubail
- Number: 1

Youth career
- 2013-2020: Al-Batin

Senior career*
Years	Team	Apps	(Gls)
2020–2025	Al-Batin	25	(0)
2025–	Al-Jubail	0	(0)
- * Club domestic league appearances and goals as of 31 May 2023

Meshal Hariss (Arabic: مشعل هريس, born 22 November 1996) is a Saudi Arabian professional footballer, who plays as a goalkeeper for Al-Jubail.

== Career ==
Meshal Hariss began his career at the youth teams of Al-Batin. He was first called up to the first team during the 2019–20 season. On 6 July 2022, Hariss renewed his contract with Al-Batin until 2024. On 31 August 2022, Hariss made his first team debut by coming off the bench in the 5–0 defeat to Al-Fateh. He made his first start for the club on 9 September 2022 in the 3–0 defeat to Al-Ettifaq. On 10 September 2025, Hariss joined Al-Jubail.

== Honours ==
Al-Batin

- MS League: 2019–20
