= Yousef Fawaz =

Saudi Arabian association football player

Personal information
- Full name: Yousef Fawaz Al-Shammari
- Date of birth: 14 February 2002 (age 24)
- Place of birth: Hafar al-Batin, Saudi Arabia
- Height: 1.73 m (5 ft 8 in)
- Positions: Forward; winger

Team information
- Current team: Al-Batin
- Number: 77

Youth career
- Al-Batin

Senior career*
Years	Team	Apps	(Gls)
2022–	Al-Batin	18	(3)
- * Club domestic league appearances and goals as of 15 April 2023

Yousef Fawaz (Arabic: يوسف فواز; born 14 February 2002) is a Saudi Arabian professional footballer who plays as a forward for Pro League side Al-Batin.

== Career ==
Yousef Fawaz began his career at hometown club Al-Batin. He was first called up to the first team on 5 May 2022 where he was an unused substitute in the 2–2 draw against Al-Ahli. He made his debut on 27 May 2022 by coming off the bench against Al-Hazem. He scored two goals between the 87th and 90th minutes, helping Al-Batin to a 3–2 win. On 10 July 2022, Yousef Fawaz signed his first professional contract with the club. On 26 August 2022, Yousef Fawaz made his first start for Al-Batin in the 3–0 loss to Al-Shabab. On 6 October 2022, he assisted Yousef Al-Shammari's opener in the 2–2 draw with Damac. This was Al-Batin's first point of the 2022–23 season. On 16 December 2022, Yousef Fawaz scored his first goal of the 2022–23 season in the 3–1 defeat to Al-Hilal.
