= King Khaled Military City Airport =

King Khaled Military City Airport مطار مدينة الملك خالد العسكرية
- IATA: KMC; ICAO: OEKK

Summary
- Airport type: Military / Public
- Serves: Hafar al-Batin
- Location: King Khalid Military City, Saudi Arabia
- Elevation AMSL: 1,352 ft / 412 m
- Coordinates: 27°54′03.1″N 045°31′41.4″E

Map
- Location of airport in Saudi Arabia

Runways
Direction	Length		Surface
Direction	m	ft	Surface
13/31	3,659	12,005	Asphalt

King Khaled Military City Airport (Arabic: مطار مدينة الملك خالد العسكرية, IATA: KMC, ICAO: OEKK) is an airport in King Khalid Military City, Eastern Province, Saudi Arabia. It is located 70 kilometres (43 mi) southwest of Hafar al-Batin. There are a limited number of civilian flights from the airport.

== Facilities ==
The airport resides at an elevation of 1,352 feet (412 m) above mean sea level. It has one runway designated 13/31 with an asphalt surface measuring 3,659 by 45 metres (12,005 ft × 148 ft).

== See also ==
- List of things named after Saudi kings
- Armed Forces of Saudi Arabia
- Saudi Arabian National Guard
