= Hamad Al-Rubaie =

Saudi Arabian footballer

Personal information
- Full name: Hamad Al-Rubaie Al-Yami
- Date of birth: July 1, 1981 (age 45)
- Place of birth: Najran, Saudi Arabia
- Height: 1.65 m (5 ft 5 in)
- Position: Midfielder

Senior career*
Years	Team	Apps	(Gls)
–2011	Al Akhdoud		
2011–2018	Najran SC	107	(7)
2018–2019	Al Akhdoud		
2020	Al-Sahel		
2021–2022	Mudhar		
- * Club domestic league appearances and goals

Hamad Al-Rubaie (Arabic: حمد الربيعي; born July 1, 1981), is a Saudi Arabian professional footballer who plays as a midfielder .

== Personal life ==
Hamad is the brother of the players Saeed Al-Rubaie, Abdullah Al-Rubaie and the cousin of the players Mohammed Al Rubaie and Masoud Al-Rubaie.
