= Andrés Felipe Roa =

Colombian footballer (born 1993)

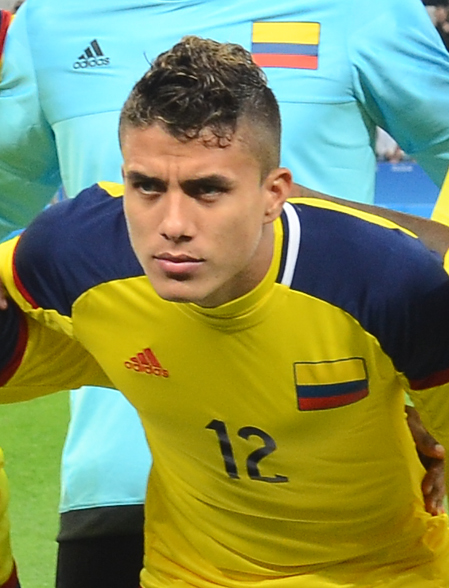
- Roa with Colombia at the 2016 Summer Olympics

Personal information
- Full name: Andrés Felipe Roa Estrada
- Date of birth: May 25, 1993 (age 33)
- Place of birth: Sabanalarga, Colombia
- Height: 1.75 m (5 ft 9 in)
- Positions: Attacking midfielder; left winger

Team information
- Current team: Once Caldas
- Number: 20

Youth career
- Deportivo Cali

Senior career*
Years	Team	Apps	(Gls)
2012–2020	Deportivo Cali	107	(10)
2013	→ Uniautónoma (loan)	41	(6)
2014	→ Unión Magdalena (loan)	24	(4)
2018–2019	→ Huracán (loan)	16	(4)
2019–2020	→ Independiente (loan)	21	(2)
2021–2022	Independiente	61	(6)
2022–2023	Argentinos Juniors	18	(1)
2023	Al-Batin	15	(3)
2023–2024	Huracán	11	(0)
2024−2025	Panetolikos	28	(1)
2025−	América de Cali	11	(0)
2026−	Once Caldas	24	(2)

International career
2015–2016	Colombia	2	(0)
2016	Colombia Olympic	7	(0)
Medal record
Colombia
Copa América Centenario
Bronze medal – third place	2016 United States
- * Club domestic league appearances and goals as of 11 December 2025

Andrés Felipe Roa Estrada (born May 25, 1993) is a Colombian professional footballer who plays as an attacking midfielder or left winger for Once Caldas.

== Career ==
He was crowned champion of Colombia with Deportivo Cali in 2015. He is known for his flair and pace as a creative midfielder. He impressed in his first Copa Libertadores campaign despite his side's poor showing and managed to score against Racing Club.

In July 2019, Roa joined Argentine Primera División club Independiente on a one-year loan deal with a purchase option on 1,3 million dollars until 31 January 2020. In December 2019 it was reported, that Independiente was ready to trigger the option. However, the clubs never reached a final agreement, but instead extended the duration of the loan in June 2020 until the end of the year, once again with a purchase option. On 30 December 2020, Independiente finally paid the purchase option and signed Roa on a permanent deal. In July 2022, Roa moved to fellow league club Argentinos Juniors.

On 7 January 2023, Roa joined Saudi Arabian club Al-Batin.

On 28 August 2023, Roa joined Huracán.

On 6 January 2026, Roa Joined Once Caldas.

== Honours ==
Deportivo Cali

- Categoría Primera A: 2015-I

Colombia

- Copa América: Third place 2016
