= Abdulaziz Al-Alawi =

Saudi Arabian footballer

Personal information
- Full name: Abdulaziz Abdullah Al-Alawi
- Date of birth: 25 May 1998 (age 28)
- Place of birth: Saudi Arabia
- Height: 1.74 m (5 ft 9 in)
- Position: Left back

Team information
- Current team: Al-Tai
- Number: 12

Youth career
- –2018: Al-Ahli

Senior career*
Years	Team	Apps	(Gls)
2018–2019	Abha	3	(0)
2019	Al-Orobah	10	(0)
2019–2020	Ohod	31	(0)
2020–2023	Al-Nassr	4	(0)
2021–2022	→ Al-Batin (loan)	13	(0)
2023	Al-Adalah	7	(0)
2023–2024	Ohod	8	(0)
2024–2025	Al-Ula	26	(0)
2025–	Al-Tai	0	(0)
- * Club domestic league appearances and goals

Abdulaziz Abdullah Al-Alawi (Arabic: عَبْد الْعَزِيز عَبْد الله الْعَلَّاوِيّ; born 25 May 1998), is a Saudi Arabian professional footballer who plays as a left back for Al-Tai.

== Career ==
Al-Alawi started his career at the youth team of Al-Ahli and represented the club at every level except the senior level. On 24 August 2018, Al-Alawi joined Abha on a one-year contract following his release from Al-Ahli. On 14 January 2019, he was released after making 2 appearances in all competitions. On 30 January 2019, Al-Alawi joined Al-Orobah on a six-month contract. Following Al-Orobah's relegation, Al-Alawi joined Ohod on a one-year contract. On 17 July 2020, Al-Alawi joined Al-Nassr on a free transfer. He signed a three-year contract with the club. On 7 August 2021, Al-Alawi joined Al-Batin on loan. On 17 January 2023, Al-Alawi joined Al-Adalah on a free transfer. On 18 July 2023, Al-Alawi joined Ohod. On 18 September 2025, Al-Alawi joined Al-Tai.

== Career statistics ==
=== Club ===
As of 27 June 2022.

Club	Season	League			Cup		Continental		Other		Total	
Club	Season	Division	Apps	Goals	Apps	Goals	Apps	Goals	Apps	Goals	Apps	Goals
Abha	2018–19	MS League	3	0	0	0	—		—		3	0
Al-Orobah	2018–19	MS League	10	0	0	0	—		—		10	0
Ohod	2019–20	MS League	31	0	1	0	—		—		32	0
Al-Nassr	2020–21	Pro League	4	0	0	0	1	0	—		5	0
Al-Batin (loan)	2021–22	Pro League	13	0	1	0	—		—		14	0
Career totals			61	0	2	0	1	0	0	0	64	0

== Honours ==
=== Club ===
Al-Nassr

- Saudi Super Cup: 2020

Al-Ula

- Saudi Third Division: 2023–24
