= Bader Nasser (Saudi Arabian footballer) =

Saudi Arabian footballer

Personal information
- Full name: Bader Nasser Al-Huwaidi
- Date of birth: 7 October 2001 (age 25)
- Place of birth: Saudi Arabia
- Position: Defender

Team information
- Current team: Al-Batin
- Number: 29

Youth career
- Al-Batin

Senior career*
Years	Team	Apps	(Gls)
2021–	Al-Batin	30	(0)
- * Club domestic league appearances and goals as of 03:37, 9 February 2024 (UTC)~

Bader Nasser Al-Huwaidi (Arabic: بَدْر نَاصِر الْهُوَيْدِيّ, born 7 October 2001) is a Saudi Arabian professional footballer who plays as a defender for Pro League side Al-Batin. He is the son of current Al-Batin president Nasser Al-Huwaidi.

== Career ==
Bader Nasser started his career at the youth teams of Al-Batin. He was promoted to the first team during the 2020–21 season. He made his first-team debut on 16 September 2021 in the league match against Al-Tai.

== Career statistics ==
=== Club ===
As of 27 September 2021

Club	Season	League		King Cup		Asia		Other		Total	
Club	Season	Apps	Goals	Apps	Goals	Apps	Goals	Apps	Goals	Apps	Goals
Al-Batin	2020–21	0	0	0	0	—		—		0	0
Al-Batin	2021–22	1	0	0	0	—		—		1	0
Al-Batin	Total	1	0	0	0	0	0	0	0	1	0
Career totals		1	0	0	0	0	0	0	0	1	0
