= Saqr Mamdouh =

Saudi Arabian footballer

Personal information
- Full name: Saqr Mamdouh Al-Enezi
- Date of birth: 3 October 1998 (age 28)
- Place of birth: Saudi Arabia
- Height: 1.71 m (5 ft 7 1/2 in)
- Position: Left back

Team information
- Current team: Al-Ain
- Number: 47

Youth career
- Al-Batin

Senior career*
Years	Team	Apps	(Gls)
2021–2025	Al-Batin	45	(0)
2025	→ Al-Zulfi (loan)	2	(0)
2026–	Al-Ain	0	(0)
- * Club domestic league appearances and goals as of 27 September 2021

Saqr Mamdouh Al-Enezi (Arabic: صقر ممدوح العنزي, born 3 October 1998) is a Saudi Arabian professional footballer who plays for Al-Ain as a left back.

== Career statistics ==
=== Club ===
As of 27 September 2021

Club	Season	League		King Cup		Asia		Other		Total	
Club	Season	Apps	Goals	Apps	Goals	Apps	Goals	Apps	Goals	Apps	Goals
Al-Batin	2021–22	3	0	0	0	—		—		3	0
Al-Batin	Total	3	0	0	0	0	0	0	0	1	0
Career totals		1	0	0	0	0	0	0	0	3	0
