= Masoud Al-Rubaie =

Saudi Arabian footballer (born 1995)

Personal information
- Full name: Masoud Faraj Al-Rubaie Al-Yami
- Date of birth: December 17, 1995 (age 30)
- Place of birth: Najran, Saudi Arabia
- Position: Centre-back

Youth career
- Al-Okhdood

Senior career*
Years	Team	Apps	(Gls)
2015–2020	Al-Okhdood		
2020–2022	Al-Batin	10	(1)
2022–2023	Najran		
- * Club domestic league appearances and goals as of 31 May 2021

Masoud Al-Rubaie (Arabic: مسعود الربيعي; born 17 December 1995) is a Saudi Arabian professional footballer who plays as a centre-back.

== Personal life ==
Masoud is the older brother of Al-Ahli goalkeeper Mohammed Al-Rubaie and the cousin of the players Hamad Al-Rabaei, Saeed Al-Rubaie and Abdullah Al-Rubaie.

== Career ==
Al-Rubaie started his career at the youth teams of hometown club Al-Okhdood. He made his debut during the 2015–16 season and was part of the squad that won the 2017–18 Third Division. On 25 October 2020, Al-Rubaie joined Pro League club Al-Batin. He made his debut on 17 February 2021, in the 2–1 league win against Abha. On 23 August 2022, Al-Rubaie joined Najran.

== Honours ==
Al-Okhdood

- Saudi Third Division: 2017–18
