= Hafar al-Batin =

- City
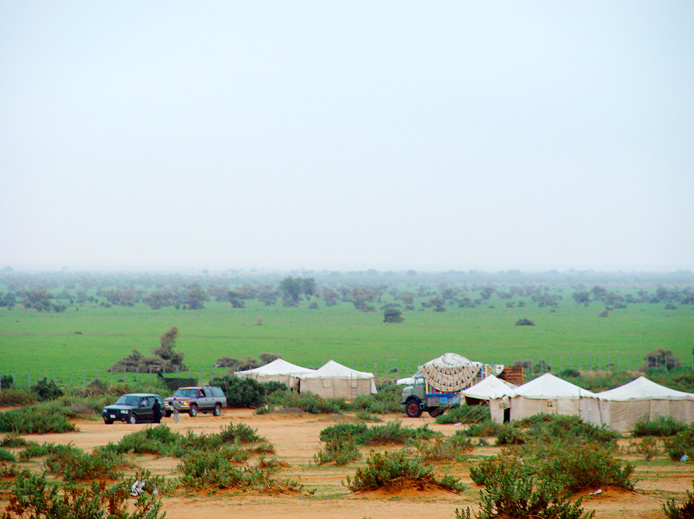
- Nickname: Capital of the Spring
- Location within Saudi Arabia
- Coordinates: 28°26′3″N 45°57′49″E
- Country: Saudi Arabia
- Province: Eastern Province
- Established: 638 CE (17 AH)
- Joint Saudi Arabia: 1925

Government
  - Manager of Municipality: Muhammad Hmoud AlShaie’a
  - City Governor: Abdulmuhsen Al-Otaishan
  - Deputy Governor: Musliet Abdulaziz AlZugaibi
  - Provincial Governor: Saud bin Nayef Al Saud

Population (2022)
  - City: 387,096
  - Metro: 467,007 (Hafar al-Batin Governorate)
- Time zone: UTC+3 (AST)
  - Summer (DST): UTC+3 (AST)
- Postal Code: 31991
- Area code: +966-1-3-7

Hafar al-Batin (Arabic: حفر الباطن Ḥafar al-Bāṭin), also frequently spelled Hafr al-Batin, is a city in the Hafar al-Batin Governorate, Eastern Province, Saudi Arabia. It is located 430 km north of Riyadh, 94.2 km from the Kuwait border, and about 74.3 from the Iraq border. The city lies in the dry valley of the Wadi al-Batin, which is part of the longer valley of the river Wadi al-Rummah (now dry), which leads inland toward Medina and formerly emptied into the Persian Gulf.

== History ==
=== Water issue ===
The name of Hafar al-Batin (Arabic: حفر الباطن, "the inner hole") is derived from its location; the water hole in the desert..

In the 1st Islamic century after hijrah or 638 CE, Hafar al-Batin was just a highway oasis in the desert that pilgrims passed while travelling to Mecca for Hajj. It falls on the route from Asia towards the Red Sea. It's an ancient desert trail that delivered silk and metals coming from China towards Mecca and Jeddah. The new formed Muslim Caliphate moved in immediately and gained hold of the area. At the time of Islam's arrival, there was little water available in the area, so the pilgrims travelled from Iraq to Mecca on a long route without much water. During the reign of Uthman (644 - 656 CE), many pilgrims complained about the lack of water, and Abu-Musa al-Asha'ari, a companion of the Islamic prophet Muhammad was placed in charge of the area and responded by digging new wells along the route. He ended up leaving a heavy impact on the oasis which eventually turned it into a desert stop. His descendants also resided in the area afterwards in which became a small town.

== Ancient importance ==
Haffar al-batin is an ancient home to many nomadic Arab inhabitants. Although it lacked water on an industrial level, it had its own strategic feature. Keeping this region dry was a critical move by the Arabs to prevent foreign armies, especially the Persians, from entering the inner desert. It was a natural barrier to foreign threats. The Arabs had camels and guides; others didn't which kept it safe for travelling Arabs and bedouins. Striking oil while digging wells is common in this region and the local Arabs knew the water ways; others didn't. This is what stopped Hulegu Khan's army from advancing towards Mecca in the 1200's. Due to its tough climate, his expeditionary officers reasoned that it was impossible for the 300 thousand man army to go south of Basra, thus they had to go north hoping to go around the Fertile Crescent which turned out to be quagmire on the long run.

=== Recent history ===
The Suhail Arab clan make up some of Haffar al-batin population along with many other Sunni Arabs such as Anizah and Shammar. The region was part of Kuwait before the Uqair Protocol of 1922 in which it was given to Saudi Arabia. The Saudi Arabia Ministry of Housing announced in August 2020 that they would be including Hafr Al Batin in its program to increase residential ownership by its citizens. The ministry will be providing 759 plots in Hafr Al Batin alone.

== Infrastructure ==
Diagonal Highway 85 to the Levant crosses the ancient desert trail towards Buraydah and Taif, now Highway 50, and meet downtown Haffar al-batin. There is a distillation plant in the area, along with an electric substation and an army base to serve the area. The city has an industrial park for heavy manufacturing plants. Local population is about half a million residents along with a considerable foreign class.

== Population ==
In 2010, Hafar al-Batin, had more than 35 villages in its suburban area and the total area population was around 400,000 to 600,000.

- Hafar al-Batin about +300,642 28°26′3″N 45°57′49″E
- Qaisumah about +22,538 28°18′32″N 46°08′00″E
- Al-Theebiyah about +14,442 28°07′30″N 45°40′03″E
- Ar Raqa'i +5,665 29°01′00″N 46°33′00″E
- As Su'ayerah about +3,607
- As Sufayri about +2,481 28°31′25″N 45°48′09″E
- Al-Qalt - Ibn Tuwalah about +1,128 28°37′48″N 45°19′48″E
- Samoudah about +914
- As Sadawi about +822
- Um Qulaib about +612 27°49′50″N 45°58′55″E
- An Nazim about +585 28°39′00″N 45°13′12″E
- Dhabhah about +267
- Um Ashar about +73 27°43′12″N 45°03′36″E
- Al-Metiahah Al-Janobiyah about +61
- Al-Hamatiyat about +17

== Transportation ==
=== Airport ===
For full international service, the city is served by King Fahd International Airport with driving distance of 450 km.

Nonetheless, Hafar al-Batin has two airports: One with limited domestic flights (Qaisumah) (IATA: AQI, ICAO: OEPA) airport about 20 km in the southeast, and one for military use only (King Khaled Military City Airport) (IATA: KMC, ICAO: OEKK) about 70 km in the southwest.

=== Roads ===
All the downtown roads of Hafar al-Batin are paved. It is connected with an international network of roads, connecting Saudi Arabia with Kuwait in the East and connecting the North with the Eastern Province.

== Districts ==
- Al-Aziziah A
- Al-Aziziah B
- Al-Khalediyah
- Al-Rabwah
- Al-Muhammadiyah
- Al-Baladiyah
- Al-Rawdhah
- Al-Nayefiyah
- Al-Sulaimaniyah
- Al-Faisaliyah
- Abu-Musa al-Asha'ari - the old neighborhood.

== Climate ==
The weather in Hafar al-Batin ranges from −2–8 °C (28–46 °F) in winter nights to 40–50 °C (104–122 °F) during summer days. The climate in general is hot and dry, and it rains only during winter months.

Köppen-Geiger climate classification system classifies its climate as hot desert (BWh).

Climate data for Hafar al-Batin (1991-2020)
Month	Jan	Feb	Mar	Apr	May	Jun	Jul	Aug	Sep	Oct	Nov	Dec	Year
Record high °C (°F)	30.5 (86.9)	35.0 (95.0)	39.4 (102.9)	43.5 (110.3)	47.8 (118.0)	49.0 (120.2)	52.0 (125.6)	50.5 (122.9)	47.8 (118.0)	43.8 (110.8)	40.0 (104.0)	30.2 (86.4)	52.0 (125.6)
Mean daily maximum °C (°F)	18.1 (64.6)	21.3 (70.3)	26.4 (79.5)	33.0 (91.4)	39.0 (102.2)	42.9 (109.2)	43.9 (111.0)	44.4 (111.9)	41.2 (106.2)	35.7 (96.3)	26.0 (78.8)	19.8 (67.6)	32.6 (90.7)
Daily mean °C (°F)	11.7 (53.1)	14.4 (57.9)	19.1 (66.4)	25.2 (77.4)	31.4 (88.5)	35.1 (95.2)	36.4 (97.5)	36.7 (98.1)	33.1 (91.6)	27.6 (81.7)	19.0 (66.2)	13.3 (55.9)	25.3 (77.5)
Mean daily minimum °C (°F)	5.8 (42.4)	7.6 (45.7)	11.4 (52.5)	17.4 (63.3)	23.2 (73.8)	26.3 (79.3)	27.4 (81.3)	27.4 (81.3)	24.1 (75.4)	19.4 (66.9)	12.4 (54.3)	7.2 (45.0)	17.5 (63.4)
Record low °C (°F)	−5.0 (23.0)	−1.5 (29.3)	0.2 (32.4)	5.0 (41.0)	14.0 (57.2)	18.5 (65.3)	23.0 (73.4)	22.0 (71.6)	16.5 (61.7)	11.0 (51.8)	0.8 (33.4)	−3.7 (25.3)	−5.0 (23.0)
Average precipitation mm (inches)	27.5 (1.08)	11.2 (0.44)	12.2 (0.48)	17.1 (0.67)	2.7 (0.11)	0.0 (0.0)	0.0 (0.0)	0.0 (0.0)	0.0 (0.0)	2.9 (0.11)	21.1 (0.83)	19.1 (0.75)	113.8 (4.47)
Average precipitation days (≥ 1.0 mm)	3.3	1.7	2.2	3.0	0.9	0.0	0.0	0.0	0.0	0.5	2.4	3.1	17.1
Source: World Meteorological Organization

== Gallery ==
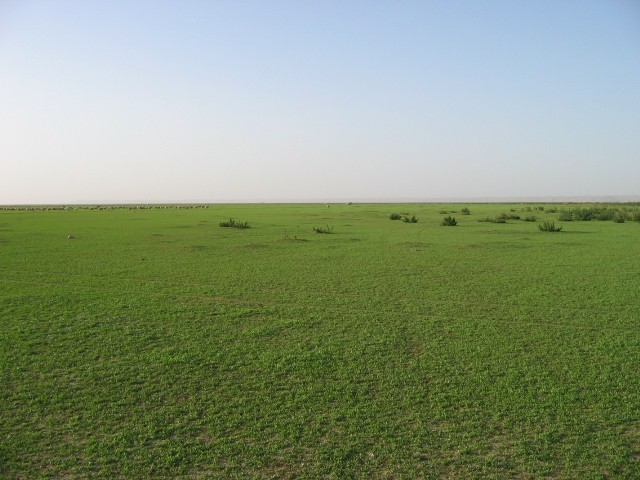

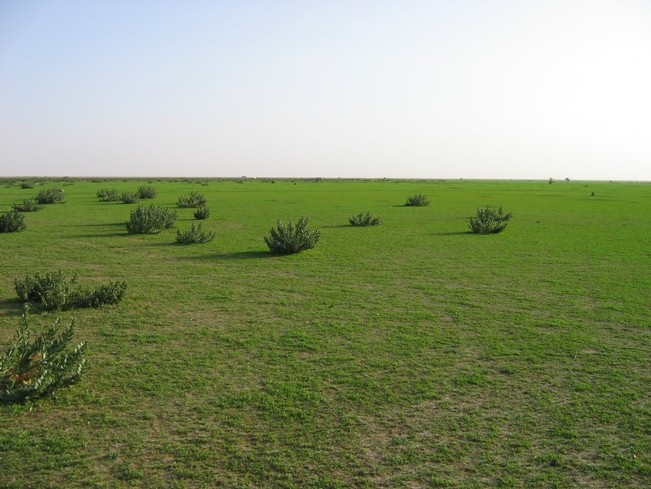

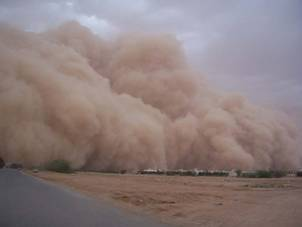

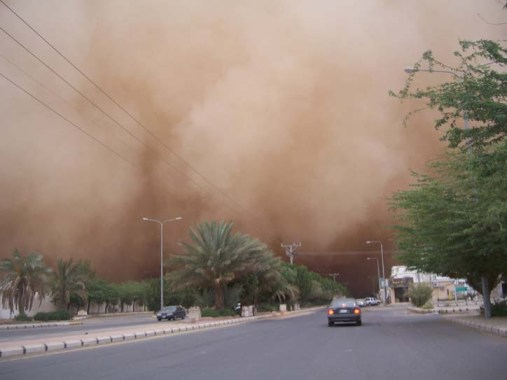

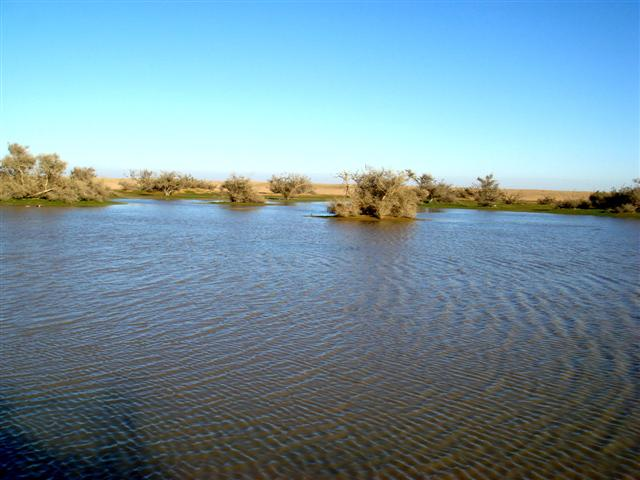

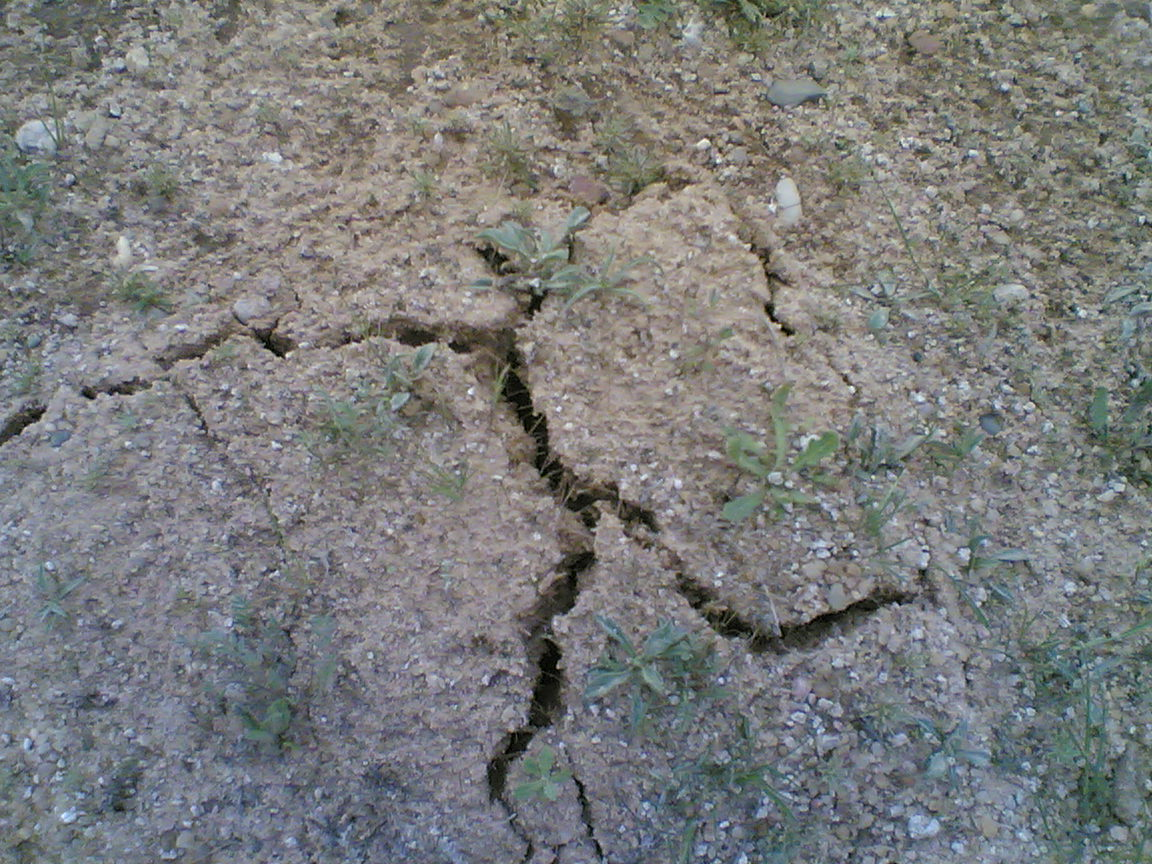

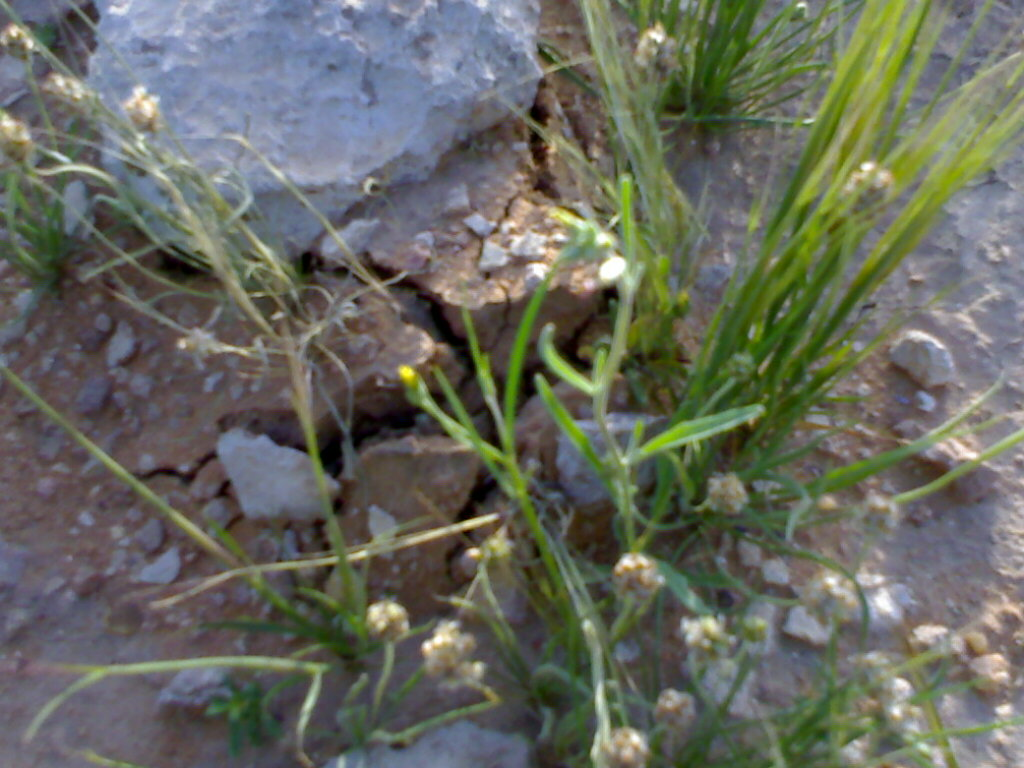

== See also ==
- List of cities and towns in Saudi Arabia
- Eastern Province, Saudi Arabia
- Al Batin FC
