= Al Batin FC =

Association football club in Saudi Arabia

Al Batin
- Full name: Al-Batin Football Club
- Nickname: Al Samawi (The Sky Blue)
- Founded: 1979; 47 years ago
- Ground: Al-Batin Club Stadium; Hafar al-Batin, Saudi Arabia
- Capacity: 6,000
- President: Khaled Al-Huwaidi
- Head coach: Abdulaziz Al-Shammari
- League: First Division League
- 2025–26: FDL, 16th of 18
- Website: albatin.sa
Home colours	Away colours

Al-Batin F.C. (Arabic: نادي الباطن لكرة القدم) is a Saudi Arabian professional football club based in Hafar al-Batin, Eastern Province, that competes in the Saudi First Division League.

== History ==
Al-Batin's colours are sky blue and black. At the end of the 2007–08 season, they won their first promotion to Saudi Second Division. On 25 March 2011, Al-Batin won their first promotion to Saudi First Division. They play their home matches at the Al-Batin Club Stadium.

== Honours ==
- Saudi First Division League (tier 2)
  - Winners (1): 2019–20
  - Runners-up (1): 2015–16
- Saudi Second Division League (tier 3)
  - Runners-up (1): 2010–11
- Saudi Third Division League (tier 5)
  - Runners-up (1): 2007–08

== Coaching staff ==
Position	Name
Head coach	(Saudi Arabia) Abdulaziz Al-Shammari
Assistant coach	(Saudi Arabia) Mohaamed Al-Rashidi
Goalkeeper coach	(Saudi Arabia) Abdulrahman Al-Koroni
Youth coach	(Albania) Gersi Arbri
Fitness coach	(Saudi Arabia) Hassan Al-Khathlan
Video analysis	(Saudi Arabia) Mohammed Al-Nakhli
Team coordinator	(Saudi Arabia) Abbas Al-Jumaili
Doctor	(Saudi Arabia) Ibrahim Al-Samti
Physiotherapists	(Saudi Arabia) Ahmed Al-Nassr
General coordinator	(Saudi Arabia) Ammar Al-Koroni
Kit manager	(Saudi Arabia) Abdulelah Al-Jafri

== Managerial history ==
- (Algeria) Rachid Mezghiche (2002 – 2003)
- (Egypt) Jamal El Khodary (August 1, 2005 – April 1, 2007)
- (Egypt) Hassan Abdelfattah (August 13, 2007 – May 1, 2008)
- (Tunisia) Abdelhamid Salmi (July 1, 2009 – September 16, 2009)
- (Algeria) Rachid Mezghiche (September 16, 2009 – May 1, 2010)
- (Egypt) Emad Al-Qasem (July 1, 2010 – December 15, 2011)
- (Tunisia) Nasser Nefzi (December 22, 2011 – February 13, 2014)
- (Brazil) Ednaldo Patricio (February 14, 2014 – April 6, 2014)
- (Saudi Arabia) Naif Al-Anezi (May 9, 2014 – August 31, 2014)
- (Tunisia) Habib Ben Romdhane (September 1, 2014 – February 12, 2016)
- (Tunisia) Yousri bin Kahla (February 12, 2016 – April 27, 2016)
- (Saudi Arabia) Khalid Al-Koroni (April 27, 2016 – May 27, 2016)
- (Egypt) Adel Abdel Rahman (June 8, 2016 – November 6, 2016)
- (Saudi Arabia) Khalid Al-Koroni (November 6, 2016 – May 17, 2017)
- (Portugal) Quim Machado (May 24, 2017 – February 4, 2018)
- (Romania) Ciprian Panait (February 6, 2018 – May 31, 2018)
- (Belgium) Franky Vercauteren (July 26, 2018 – November 1, 2018)
- (Saudi Arabia) Yousef Al-Ghadeer (November 10, 2018 – February 17, 2019)
- (Romania) Ciprian Panait (February 17, 2019 – May 31, 2019)
- (Tunisia) Ridha Jeddi (July 6, 2019 – September 24, 2019)
- (Portugal) José Garrido (September 24, 2019 – March 20, 2021)
- (Serbia) Aleksandar Veselinovic (March 24, 2021 – June 1, 2021)
- (Serbia) Nenad Lalatović (June 25, 2021 — October 17, 2021)
- (Serbia) Darko Nović (caretaker) (October 17, 2021 — October 21, 2021)
- (Croatia) Alen Horvat (October 21, 2021 — February 19, 2023)
- (Croatia) Zdravko Logarušić (February 19, 2023 — June 1, 2023)
- (Serbia) Srđan Vasiljević (July 15, 2023 — September 13, 2023)
- (Portugal) Quim Machado (September 13, 2023 – March 1, 2024)
- (North Macedonia) Gjore Jovanovski (March 1, 2024 – May 11, 2024)
- (Saudi Arabia) Abdulaziz Nasser (caretaker) (May 11, 2024 – May 28, 2024)
- (Portugal) Rui Almeida (July 15, 2024 – October 16, 2024)
- (Tunisia) Nacif Beyaoui (October 16, 2024 – February 25, 2025)
- (Saudi Arabia) Khalil Al-Masri (February 25, 2025 – June 1, 2025)
- (France) Grégory Dufrennes (August 3, 2025 – November 27, 2025)
- (Saudi Arabia) Abdulaziz Nasser (caretaker) (November 27, 2025 – December 1, 2025)
- (Portugal) Paulo Alves (December 1, 2025 – January 20, 2026)
- (Nigeria) Henry Makinwa (January 20, 2026 – )

== Current squad ==
As of 12 September 2025:

Note: Flags indicate national team as defined under FIFA eligibility rules; some limited exceptions apply. Players may hold more than one non-FIFA nationality.

No.	Pos.	Nation	Player
1	GK	KSA	Ghassan Barqawi
2	DF	KSA	Saqr Mamdouh
3	DF	KSA	Bander Nasser
4	DF	KSA	Mutlaq Al-Shammari
5	DF	GHA	Kwabena Nyanteh
6	MF	KSA	Hussain Al-Reda
7	FW	COD	Nzuzi Mata
9	FW	RWA	Abeddy Biramahire
12	FW	KSA	Mansour Al-Shammari
15	FW	KSA	Abdulrahman Saad
16	MF	KSA	Ali Al Madan
17	DF	KSA	Abdulelah Al-Shammari
20	MF	KSA	Nasser Al-Muqhim
22	GK	KSA	Khaled Al-Muqaitib
23	MF	KSA	Abdulrahman Anwar

No.	Pos.	Nation	Player
24	DF	KSA	Mostafa Al Saeed
27	MF	KSA	Abdulmajeed Obaid
29	DF	KSA	Bader Nasser
34	MF	KSA	Abdulkareem Maghrabi
37	MF	KSA	Turki Al-Dhafeeri
46	MF	KSA	Saud Al-Muqbil
55	DF	KSA	Mohammed Khalaf
77	FW	KSA	Yousef Fawaz
80	MF	COL	Deison Cuero
84	DF	KSA	Mohammed Marzouq
88	MF	KSA	Nawaf Al-Shammari
90	FW	KSA	Omar Al-Ruwaili
93	MF	KSA	Abdullah Awad
—	GK	KSA	Abdulrahman Al-Anazi
—	MF	KSA	Faraj Al-Dhafiri

== See also ==
- Hafar al-Batin
- List of football clubs in Saudi Arabia
