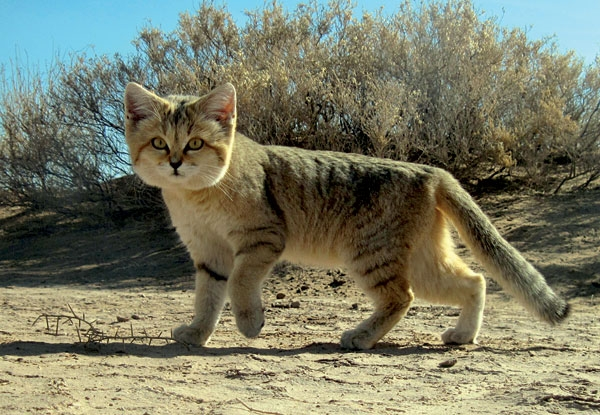

Conservation status
- Least Concern (IUCN 3.1)
- CITES Appendix II

Scientific classification
- Kingdom: Animalia
- Phylum: Chordata
- Class: Mammalia
- Order: Carnivora
- Family: Felidae
- Genus: Felis
- Species: F. margarita

Binomial name
- Felis margarita Loche, 1858

Subspecies
- F. m. margarita Loche, 1858; F. m. thinobia (Ognev, 1927)
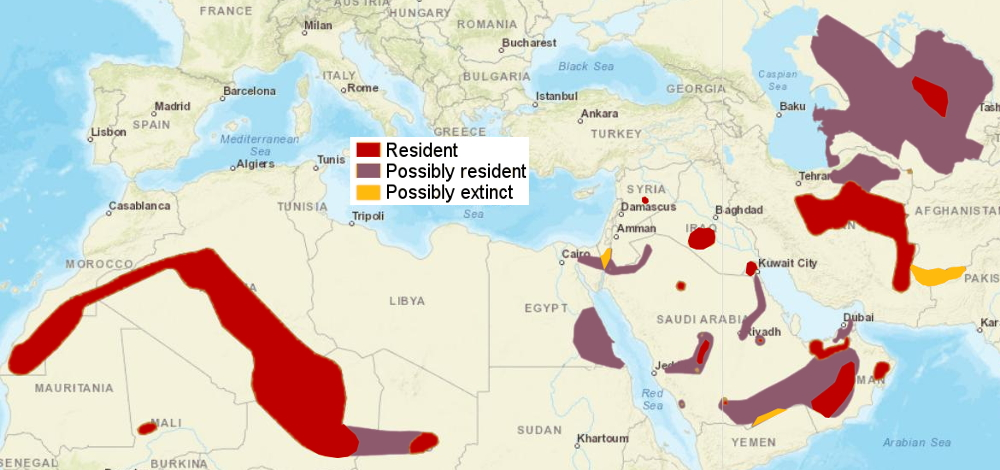
- Distribution of the sand cat in 2016

Synonyms
- synonyms of F. margarita: Felis marginata Gray, 1867; F. margaritae Trouessart, 1897; F. marguerittei Trouessart, 1905; Otocolobus margarita Heptner and Dementiev, 1937; synonyms of F. m. margarita: F. m. meinertzhageni Pocock, 1938; F. m. aïrensis Pocock, 1938; synonyms of F. m. thinobius: Eremaelurus thinobius Ognev, 1926; Felis thinobius Pocock, 1938; F. m. scheffeli Hemmer, 1974; F. m. harrisoni Hemmer, Grubb, and Groves, 1976

= Sand cat =

Small wild cat species (Felis margarita)

The sand cat (Felis margarita) is a small wild cat that inhabits sandy and stony deserts far from water sources. With its sandy to light grey fur, it is well camouflaged in a desert environment. Its head-and-body length ranges from 39–52 cm (15–20 in) with a 23–31 cm (9.1–12.2 in) long tail. Its 5–7 cm (2.0–2.8 in) short ears are set low on the sides of the head, aiding detection of prey moving underground. The long hair covering the soles of its paws insulates its pads against the extreme temperatures found in deserts.

The first sand cat known to scientists was discovered in the Algerian Sahara and described in 1858. To date, it has been recorded in several disjunct locations in Western Sahara, Morocco, Algeria, Libya, Niger, Chad, Egypt, the Arabian Peninsula and the Middle East. In Central Asia, it was first recorded in the Karakum Desert in 1925. The large gap between these two regions of its global range was partially closed in 1948, when a sand cat skin was found in an oasis of the Rub' al Khali in Oman. It is discontinuously distributed in the deserts of the Arabian Peninsula and the Middle East. In the early 1970s, sand cats were caught in southwestern Pakistan and exported to zoos worldwide. Due to its wide distribution and large population, it is listed as Least Concern on the IUCN Red List.

The sand cat usually rests in underground dens during the day and hunts at night. It moves 5.4 km (3.4 mi) on average at night in search of small rodents and birds. It also kills and consumes venomous snakes. In spring, the female gives birth to two to three kittens, which become sexually mature around the age of one year. The sand cat's ecological requirements are still poorly understood, as only a few in-depth studies targeting wild sand cat populations have been conducted.

== Taxonomy ==
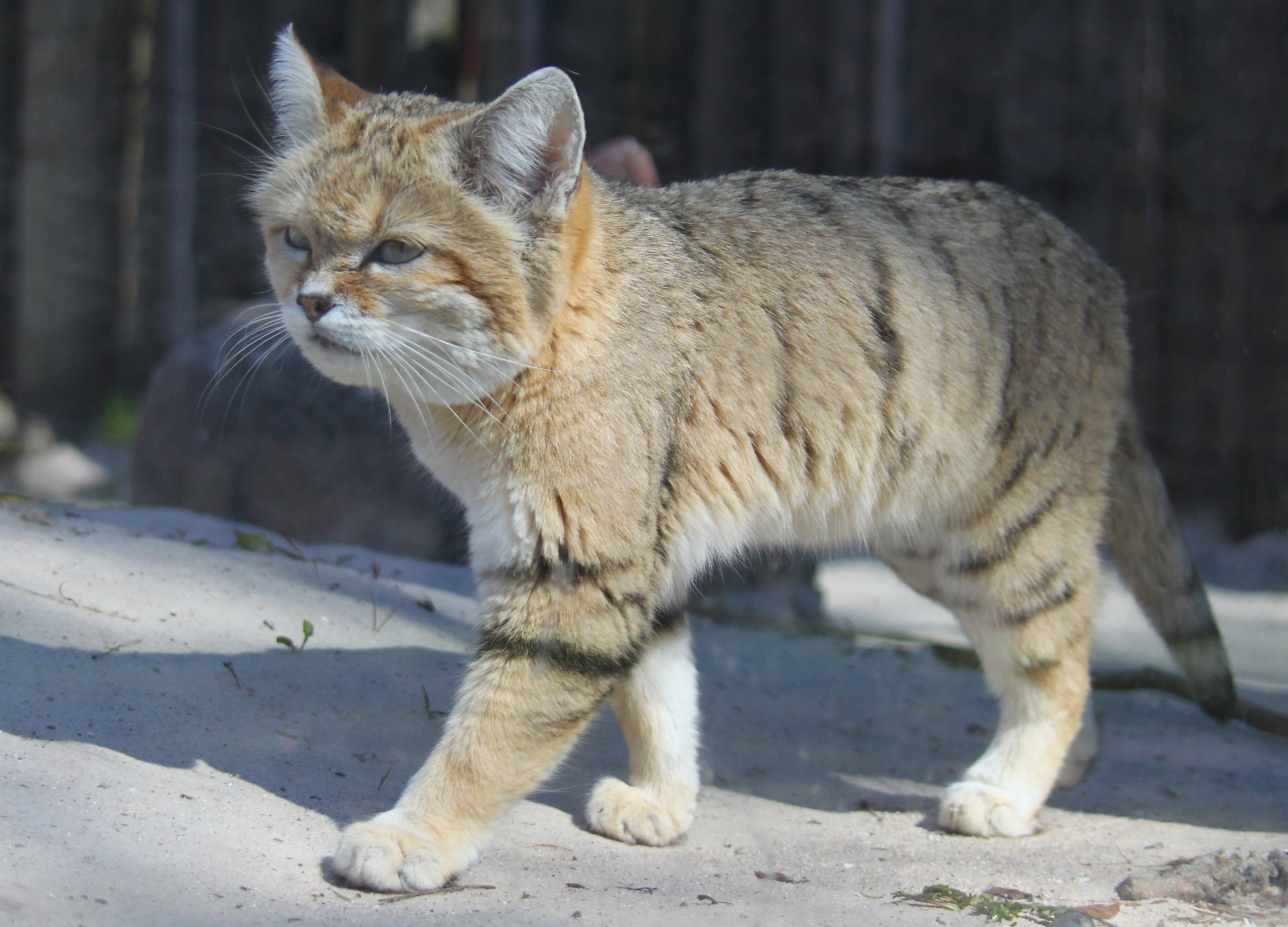
Sand cat at Ree Park zoo, Denmark

Felis margarita was the scientific name proposed by Victor Loche in 1858 who first described a sand cat specimen found in the area of "Négonça" in the northern Algerian Sahara. This holotype specimen appears to have been lost. The species was named after the French General Jean Auguste Margueritte.

In the 20th century, the following zoological specimens of sand cats were described:

- Eremaelurus thinobius was proposed as a species by Sergey Ognev in 1926. The specimen had been collected in the eastern Karakum Desert in Turkmenistan. In 1938, Reginald Innes Pocock also considered it a species, but subordinated it to the genus Felis using the scientific name Felis thinobius. Later he considered it a sand cat subspecies, which to date is widely recognised.
- F. m. meinertzhageni proposed by Pocock in 1938 was a sand cat skin from the Algerian Sahara.
- F. m. aïrensis proposed by Pocock in 1938 was a female specimen collected in the Aïr Mountains in 1937.
- F. m. scheffeli proposed by German zoologist Helmut Hemmer in 1974 was described on the basis of seven sand cats that had been captured alive in Pakistan's Nushki desert.
- F. m. harrisoni proposed by Hemmer, Grubb and Groves in 1976 was described on the basis of a skin and skull of an adult male sand cat captured in 1967 in Umm al Samim, Oman.

In 1974, F. m. margarita, F. m. thinobia and F. m. scheffeli were temporarily recognized as valid taxa. At the time, it was considered possible that sand cats eventually recorded in Afghanistan and Iran might constitute distinct subspecies. In 2005, F. m. margarita, F. m. thinobia, F. m. scheffeli and F. m. harrisoni were recognised as valid taxa by W. Chris Wozencraft, who considered F. m. meinertzhageni and F. m. aïrensis synonyms of the nominate subspecies F. m. margarita. The Cat Classification Task Force of the Cat Specialist Group reviewed the existing information and in 2017 recognized only two subspecies based on morphological differences, namely:

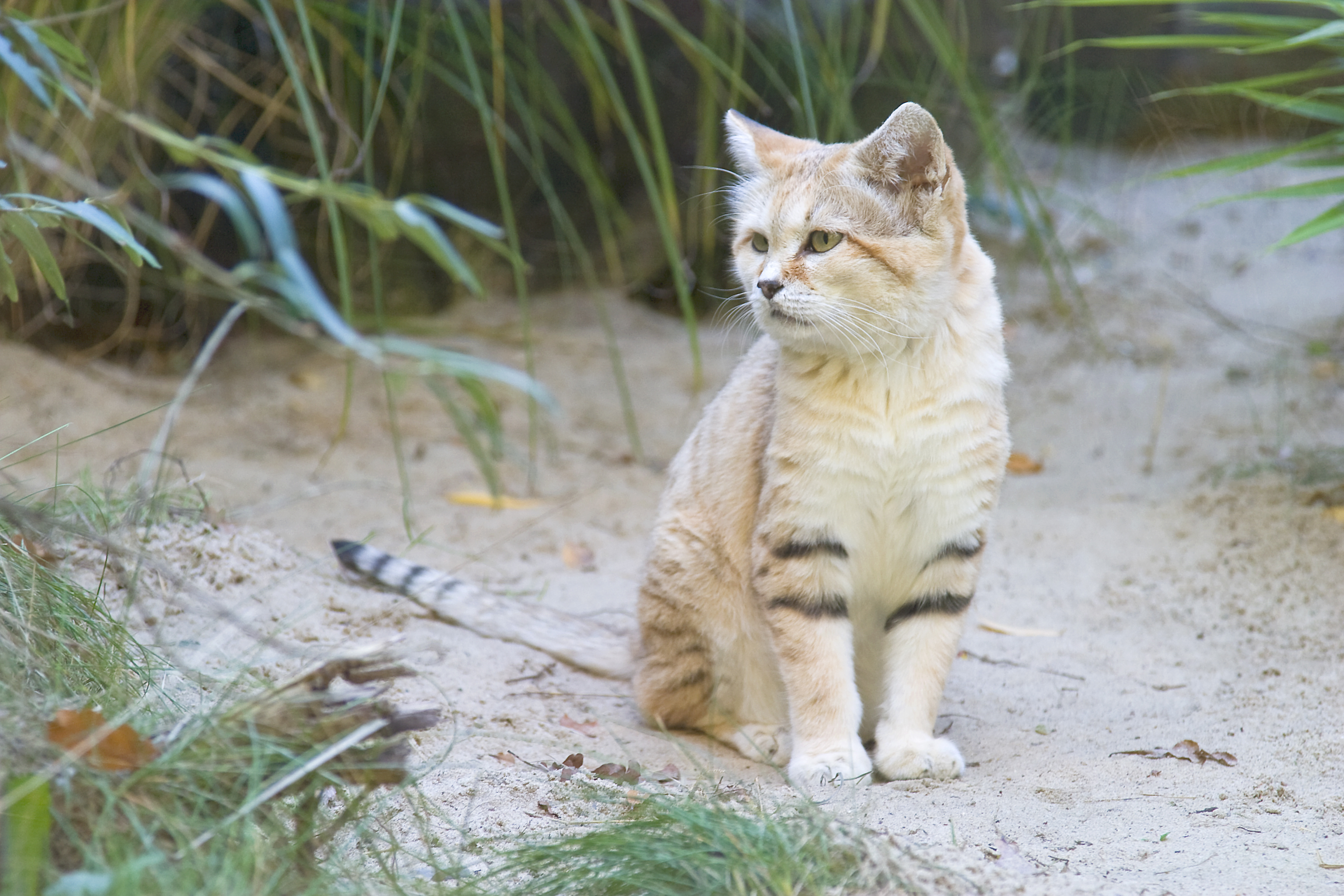
An Arabian sand cat at Osnabrück Zoo, Germany

- Felis margarita margarita, also called the Saharan sand cat, occurs in North Africa. It is smaller in size with brighter, more yellow fur, with more pronounced markings and 2–6 rings on the tail.
- Felis margarita thinobia, also called the Turkestan sand cat, Arabian sand cat, and Pakistan sand cat, it occurs in West and Central Asia. It is larger in size with less pronounced markings, a darker, more greyish coat, and only 2–3 rings on the tail.

Analysis of mitochondrial DNA of 47 individuals from across the sand cat's range showed that their haplotypes differed only by one to three base pair mutations. This low degree of genetic differentiation between the African and Asian sand cats indicates that the Sinai Peninsula may have been a barrier to gene flow.

=== Phylogeny ===
Phylogenetic analysis of the nuclear DNA in tissue samples from all Felidae species revealed that the evolutionary radiation of the Felidae began in Asia in the Miocene around 14.45 to 8.38 million years ago. Analysis of mitochondrial DNA of all Felidae species indicates a radiation at around 16.76 to 6.46 million years ago. The sand cat is part of an evolutionary lineage that is estimated to have genetically diverged from the common ancestor of the Felis species around 4.44 to 2.16 million years ago, based on analysis of their nuclear DNA. Analysis of their mitochondrial DNA indicates a genetic divergence of the Felis species at around 6.52 to 1.03 million years ago. Both models agree that the jungle cat (F. chaus) was the first Felis species that diverged, followed by the black-footed cat (F. nigripes) and then the sand cat. It migrated into Africa, possibly during Pleistocene glaciation events. Migration was likely facilitated by extended periods of low sea levels between continents.

A fossil jaw and other skeletal remains of a sand cat were excavated in a Late Pleistocene cave in El Harhoura located near Temara in Morocco.

Phylogenetic relationships of the sand cat as derived through analysis of

nuclear DNA:

- Felidae
  - Felinae
    - - - Felis
          - - - - - - Domestic cat (F. catus)
                    - European wildcat (F. silvestris)
                  - - African wildcat (F. lybica)
                    - Chinese mountain cat (F. bieti)
                - Sand cat
              - Black-footed cat
            - Jungle cat
        - other Felinae lineages
  - Pantherinae

mitochondrial DNA:

- Felidae
  - Felinae
    - - - Felis
          - - - - - - Domestic cat
                    - Chinese mountain cat
                  - - African wildcat
                    - European wildcat
                - Sand cat
              - Black-footed cat
            - Jungle cat
      - other Felinae lineages
  - Pantherinae

== Characteristics ==
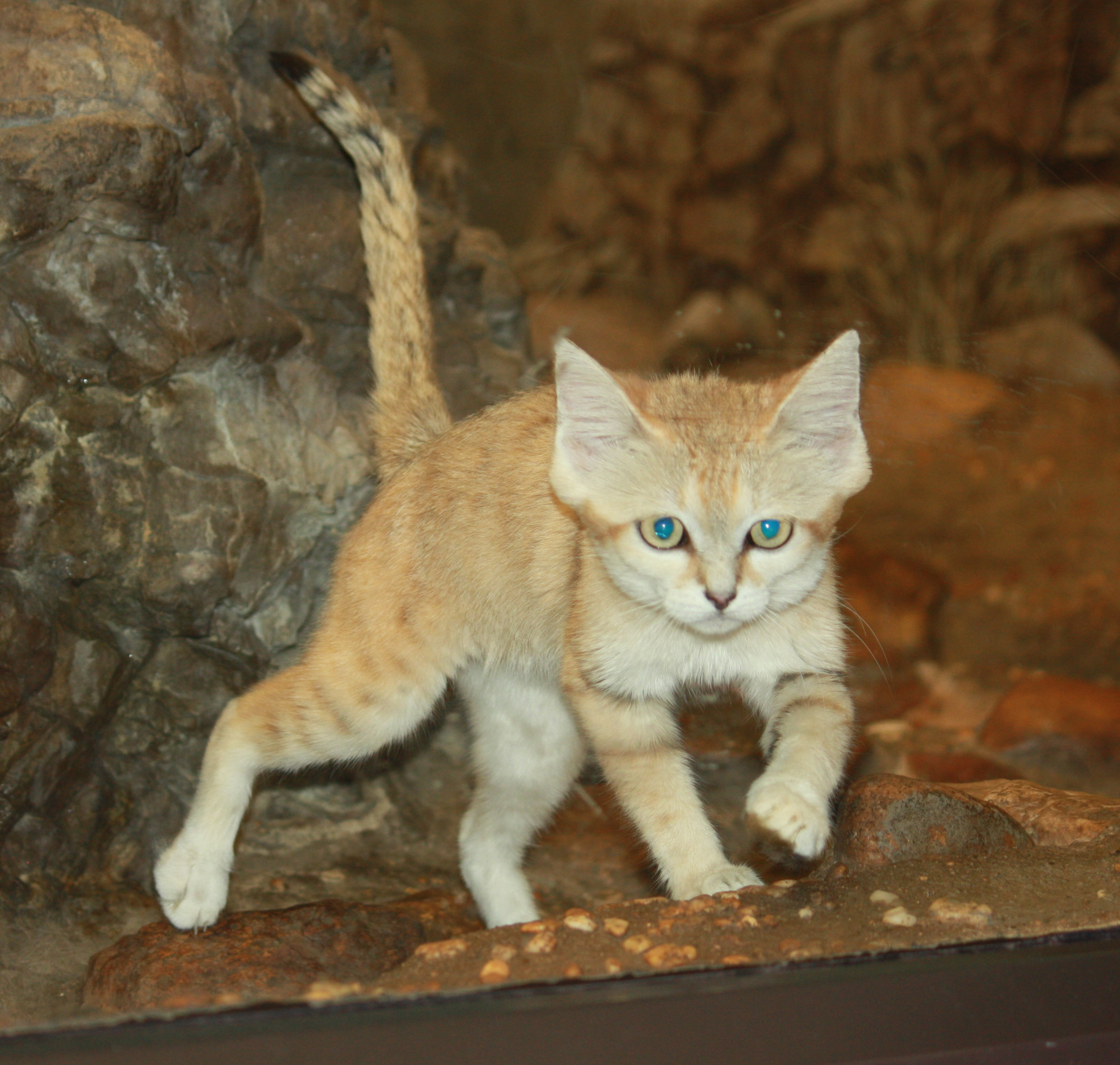
Sand cat in Cincinnati Zoo

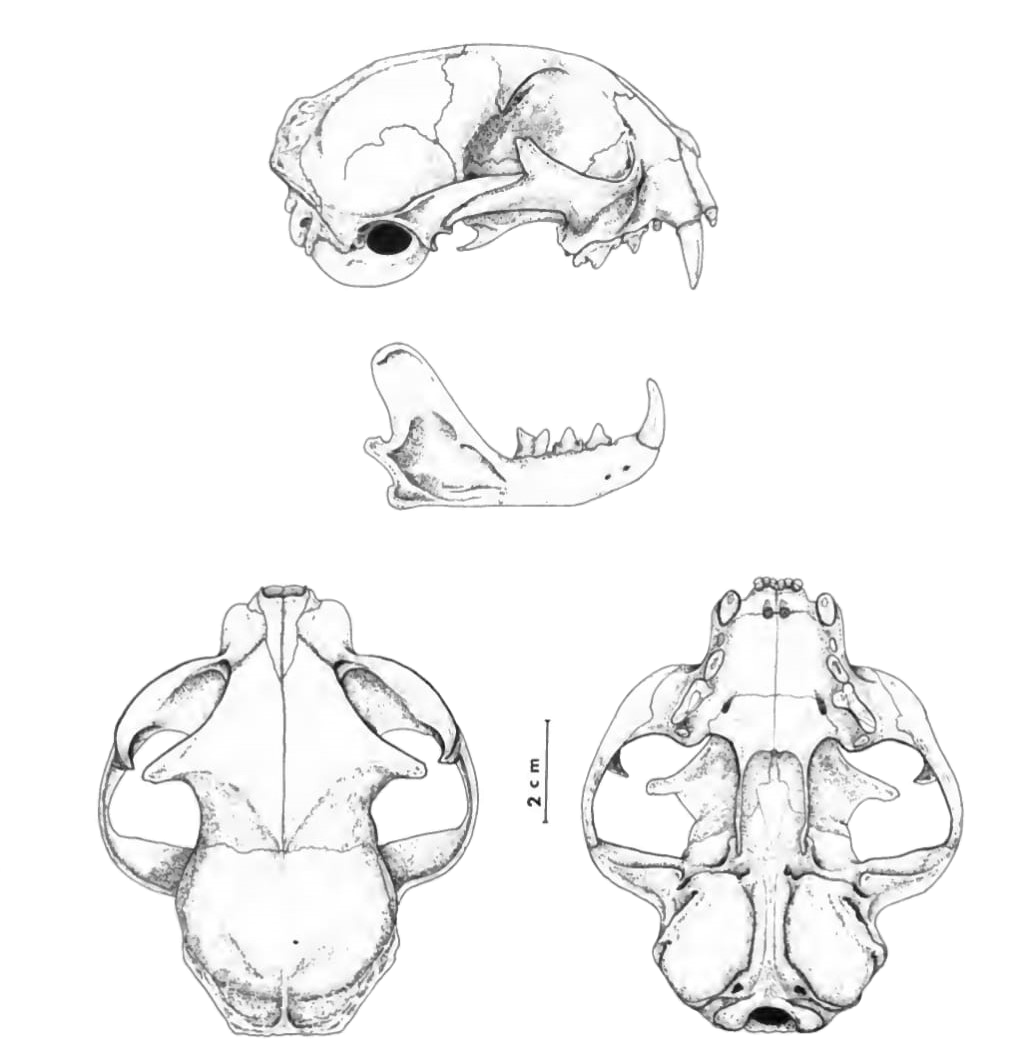
Illustration of a sand cat skull

The sand cat's fur is of a pale, sandy, isabelline colour, but much lighter on the lower part of the head, around the nose, throat, and on the belly. A faint reddish line runs from the outer corner of each eye across the cheeks. There are dark brown to blackish bars on the limbs, and the tail has a black tip with two or three dark rings alternating with buff bands. Markings vary between individuals: some have neither spots nor stripes, some are faintly spotted, some have both spots and stripes. Its head is sandy brown. The large, greenish-yellow eyes are ringed with white, and the nose is blackish. Its whiskers are white and up to 8 cm (3.1 in) long. Its ears are tawny at the base and tipped with black. Its outer ear is similar to that of a domestic cat, but its ear canal is about twice the size. The magnitude of acoustic input-admittance is about five times higher than of a domestic cat. Additionally, hearing sensitivity of the sand cat is about 8 decibels greater than that of the domestic cat.

In Central Asia, the sand cat's winter coat is very long and thick, with hairs reaching up to 51 mm (2 in) in length. Its claws on the forelimbs are short and very sharp, and claws on the hind feet are small and blunt. The undersides of its paws are protected from extreme temperatures by a thick covering of fur. The long hairs growing between its toes create a cushion of fur over the foot pads, helping to insulate them while moving over hot sand. This feature makes the cat's tracks obscure and difficult to identify and follow.

The sand cat is characterized by a flat, wide head, short legs, and a relatively long tail of 23–31 cm (9.1–12.2 in). It stands 24–36 cm (9.4–14.2 in) at the shoulder and weighs 1.5–3.4 kg (3.3–7.5 lb). The head-and-body length ranges from 39–52 cm (15–20 in). The 5–7 cm (2.0–2.8 in) long ears are set low, giving a broad, flat appearance to the head.

Its skull is arched in lateral outline with wide zygomatic arches. The pinnae of the ears are triangular, and the ear canal is very wide, giving the cat an enhanced sense of hearing. The auditory bullae and the passages from the external ears to the ear drums are greatly enlarged compared to other small wild cats; the inner parts of the ears are protected from foreign objects by long, closely spaced white hairs. It has a bite force at the canine tip of 155.4 Newton and a bite force quotient at the canine tip of 136.7.

== Distribution and habitat ==
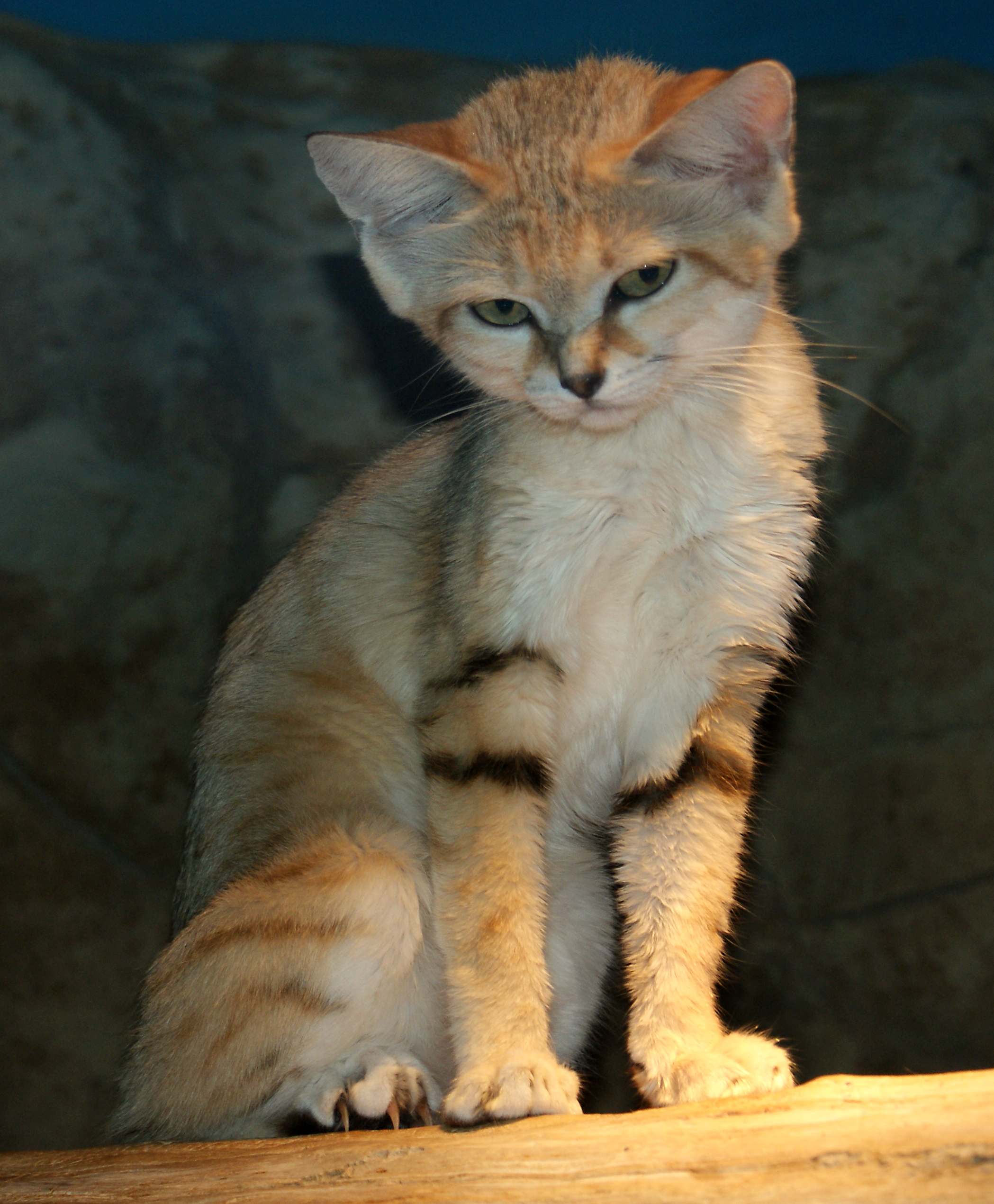
Captive sand cat

The sand cat inhabits both sandy and stony deserts. It is widely but not contiguously distributed in the deserts of North Africa and Southwest and Central Asia. It prefers flat or undulating terrain with sparse vegetation of grasses or small bushes; it avoids bare and shifting sand dunes, where little prey is available.

In the Western Sahara, sand cats were sighted and photographed in the Dakhla-Oued Ed-Dahab region several times between 2005 and 2016. Sand cat kittens that had been hiding beneath a tuft of Panicum turgidum grass were sighted and photographed in the area in April 2017. In Algeria, one individual was recorded near a salt cedar mound in the Ahaggar Mountains in 2008. In Mali's Lake Faguibine area, one individual was shortly sighted by night in 2011. In southwestern Libya, it was sighted and photographed at multiple locations between 2017 and 2025. In the Ténéré Desert, sand cats were observed in the 1980s and between 2008 and 2015. Sightings in Egypt's rocky Western and Eastern Deserts date to the mid 1980s. In the Sinai peninsula, sand cats were sighted in the mid 1990s.

On the Arabian Peninsula, a sand cat skin was discovered by Wilfred Thesiger in 1948 in an oasis of the Rub' al Khali desert. In Saudi Arabia's Mahazat as-Sayd Protected Area, sand cats were captured and encountered trapped in wire mesh fence surrounding the adjacent Saja Umm Ar-Rimth Natural Reserve in the country's Najd region. In the Tabuk Region, two sand cats were killed by hunters in 2013 and 2016; and one individual was captured by a local farmer in 2014 and kept in a cage. The sand cat was also observed in 2014–2015 in three localities in the Turaif area in northern Saudi Arabia. In 'Uruq Bani Ma'arid on the western edge of the Rub' al Khali, it uses sand dune habitat in the hot season from May to September, and gravel valleys in addition during the cool season from October to April. In King Salman Bin Abdulaziz Royal Natural Reserve, it was also recorded foremost in sand dunes between December 2022 and March 2023. In the Al-Ula region, it was recorded in five protected areas between June 2024 and July 2025. In Al Ain Region of the Emirate of Abu Dhabi, a sand cat was sighted in a gravel plain between dunes in 2003. Several sand cats were recorded in a protected area in Al Dhafra, Abu Dhabi between April and December 2015, after an absence of sightings for ten years. In Oman's Dhofar Governorate, it was recorded at several locations between 2021 and 2022. In Qatar, it was recorded for the first time in Al-Ureiq Reserve in 2023.

In southern Israel, four sand cats were radio-collared and tracked over a few months in the late 1980s in the Arabah Valley, which lies mostly in Jordan. The monitored sand cats frequently roamed in military camps of the Israeli army and crossed the international border. Since 2002, the sand cat is considered locally extinct in Israel, as it has not been recorded since the turn of the century. In Jordan, a sand cat was sighted for the first time in 1997 during a survey in a desert area in the eastern part of the country. In Syria, sand cats were sighted and photographed by a camera-trap in a protected area near Palmyra in 2000 and 2001. In western Iraq, sand cats inhabit desert areas in the Najaf, Muthanna and Al Anbar Governorates. In Iran, it occurs in arid flat plains and sandy desert of Abbas'abad Wildlife Reserve, Kavir National Park and Petergan Rural District. Between March 2014 and July 2016, sand cats were also observed at elevations of 900–1,100 m (3,000–3,600 ft) in Sistan and Baluchestan Province, foremost in black saxaul dominated habitat. In central Iran, sand cats were observed foremost in sand dunes and sabulous areas during surveys in 2014–2016.

In Pakistan, the first sand cat was detected in 1966 near the Lora River in Balochistan. In the late 1960s, sand cats were also encountered in the Chagai Hills, an extremely arid area comprising rolling sand dunes and stony plains at an elevation of about 1,200 m (3,900 ft).

In Central Asia, the sand cat was known to occur up to the late 1960s in the Karakum Desert from the Ustyurt Plateau in the northwest to the Kopet Dag Mountains in the south, and from the Kyzylkum Desert to the Syr Darya River and the northern border to Afghanistan. Adult sand cats with kittens were photographed in the southern Kyzylkum Desert in spring 2013 and 2014.

== Behaviour and ecology ==
The sand cat is solitary, except during the mating season and when a female has kittens. It makes loud, high-pitched and short rasping sounds, especially when seeking a mate. Its vocalizations are similar to those of the domestic cat. It communicates by urine spraying and using scent and scratch marks. It buries its feces and covers it with sand.

Its way of moving is distinct: with its belly close to the ground, it moves at a fast run punctuated with occasional leaps. It is capable of sudden bursts of speed and can sprint at speeds of 30–40 km (19–25 mi) per hour. Four radio-collared sand cats in Israel moved long distances of 5–10 km (3.1–6.2 mi) in a single night. They were generally active throughout the night, hunting and travelling an average distance of 5.4 km (3.4 mi). They retired below ground at dawn and stayed in the burrow during the day. During the survey period, they used several burrows in their home ranges.

Burrows are about 1.5 m (4 ft 11 in) deep and dug in slightly slanting ground with usually only a single entrance, though burrows with two or three entrances have also been observed. These burrows were either abandoned by foxes or porcupines, or dug by gerbils or other rodents. In winter, sand cats stay in the sun during the day, but during the hot season, they are crepuscular and nocturnal.

A male sand cat in Israel had a home range of 16 km^{2} (6.2 sq mi). In Morocco, a male sand cat travelled 14.1 km (8.8 mi) in 30 hours. A female sand cat moved in an area of 13.4 km^{2} (5.2 sq mi) during six days, and two males had home ranges of 21.8 and 35.3 km^{2} (8.4 and 13.6 sq mi). In 2018, several sand cats were observed resting in brown-necked raven nests built in umbrella thorn acacia trees in the Moroccan Sahara.

=== Hunting and diet ===
In the Ténéré, a desert region in south central Sahara, sand cats were observed preying foremost on small rodents, and the young of cape hare (Lepus capensis), but also hunting greater hoopoe lark (Alaemon alaudipes), desert monitor (Varanus griseus), sandfish (Scincus scincus) and venomous Cerastes vipers. If they caught more than they could eat, they buried the remains for later consumption. They satisfied their moisture requirements from their prey but drank water if it was available. The Toubou people have reported incidents of sand cats coming to their camps at night and drinking fresh camel milk.

In Israel, remains of Egyptian spiny-tailed lizards (Uromastyx aegyptia) were found near burrows used by sand cats. They were observed preying on jirds (Meriones), Cairo spiny mouse (Acomys cahirinus), desert lark (Ammomanes deserti) and small reptiles. In central Iran, remains of Blanford's jerboa (Jaculus blanfordi) and Balochistan gerbil (Gerbillus nanus) were the most frequent prey species found around dens of sand cats.

Sand cats were collected in eastern Karakum Desert in the late 1950s. Their feces and stomachs contained remains of tolai hare (Lepus tolai), small rodents, birds, small reptiles and invertebrates. In March 2018, a sand cat was recorded feeding on a MacQueen's bustard (Chlamydotis macqueenii) in the Kyzylkum Desert.

=== Reproduction and life cycle ===
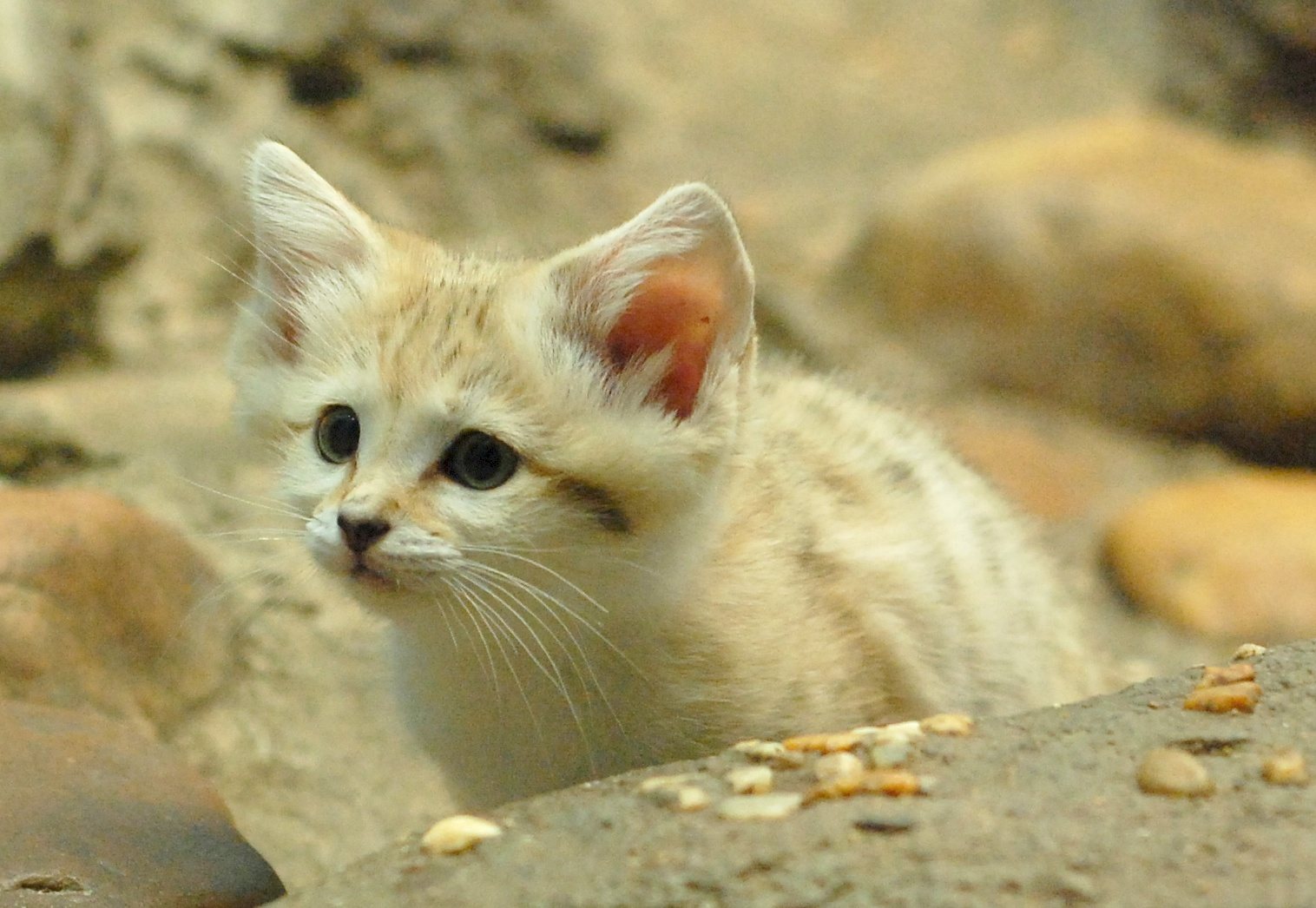
A captive sand cat kitten

Oestrus in female sand cats lasts from five to six days, during which they frequently call and scent mark. After a gestation of 59 to 66 days, they give birth to a litter of two to three kittens. The kittens weigh 39 to 80 g (1.4 to 2.8 oz) at birth, and have spotted pale yellow or reddish fur. They grow relatively rapidly, reaching three quarters of the adult size within five months, are fully independent by the end of their first year and reach sexual maturity soon after the first year. In some areas, sand cats give birth to two litters per year.

Of 228 sand cats born in zoos globally by 2007, only 61% of the kittens lived to day 30. They died primarily due to maternal neglect by first-time mothers. Otherwise, they can live up to 13 years in captivity. The life expectancy of wild sand cats has not been documented.

The generation length of the sand cat is about 4 years and 9 months.

== Threats ==
Habitat degradation and loss of sand dunes due to human activities are considered major threats to sand cat populations in Western Asia, where uncontrolled hunting and persecution of predators using poisoned baits are common practices. The sand cat's small-mammal prey-base depends on having adequate vegetation, which may experience large fluctuations due to drought or declines due to desertification and loss of natural vegetation. Fencing of protected areas threatens the sand cat in Saudi Arabia, where several individuals were found stuck in fences. In Iran, vulnerable arid ecosystems are being rapidly degraded by human settlement and activity, especially livestock grazing. In Uzbekistan, drifting sand areas are increasing, as local people uproot shrubs for use as firewood and as a substrate for silk worm (Bombyx mori) cocoons.

In the Sahara, sand cats have been killed in traps laid out by inhabitants of oases targeting foxes and golden jackals (Canis aureus) or in retaliation for killing poultry. Several cases of sand cats having been killed by domestic dogs (C. familiaris) were reported in Israel and Iran. In Israel, the sand cat was thought to be threatened by predation from caracals (Caracal caracal) and wolves (Canis lupus).

Sand cats have also been caught for the pet trade in the United Arab Emirates and in Iraq. In Baghdad, two sand cats were presented to a local nursery in 2012 that had been sold as pets; they died a week later. In 2014 and 2015, four sand cats were trapped alive by local truffle collectors and offered for sale in a wildlife market in Baghdad; their fate is unknown.

Sand cats may be at risk of transfer of diseases from domestic and feral cats encroaching on desert areas. In Saudi Arabia, one of 17 wild-caught sand cats was tested positive for feline leukaemia virus.

== Conservation ==
Felis margarita is listed on CITES Appendix II. Hunting is prohibited in Algeria, Iran, Israel, Kazakhstan, Mauritania, Niger, Pakistan, and Tunisia. No legal protection exists in Egypt, Mali, Morocco, Oman, Saudi Arabia, and the United Arab Emirates. Previously having been classified as near threatened, it has been downlisted to least concern in 2016, as the estimated size of the global population exceeds the threshold for a threatened category; the extent of decline of the global population is unknown.

The Jerusalem Biblical Zoo started a sand cat reintroduction project in Israel's Arabah Desert. Several captive-born individuals from the zoo's population were kept in an acclimatization enclosure, but did not survive subsequent release into the wild.

=== In captivity ===
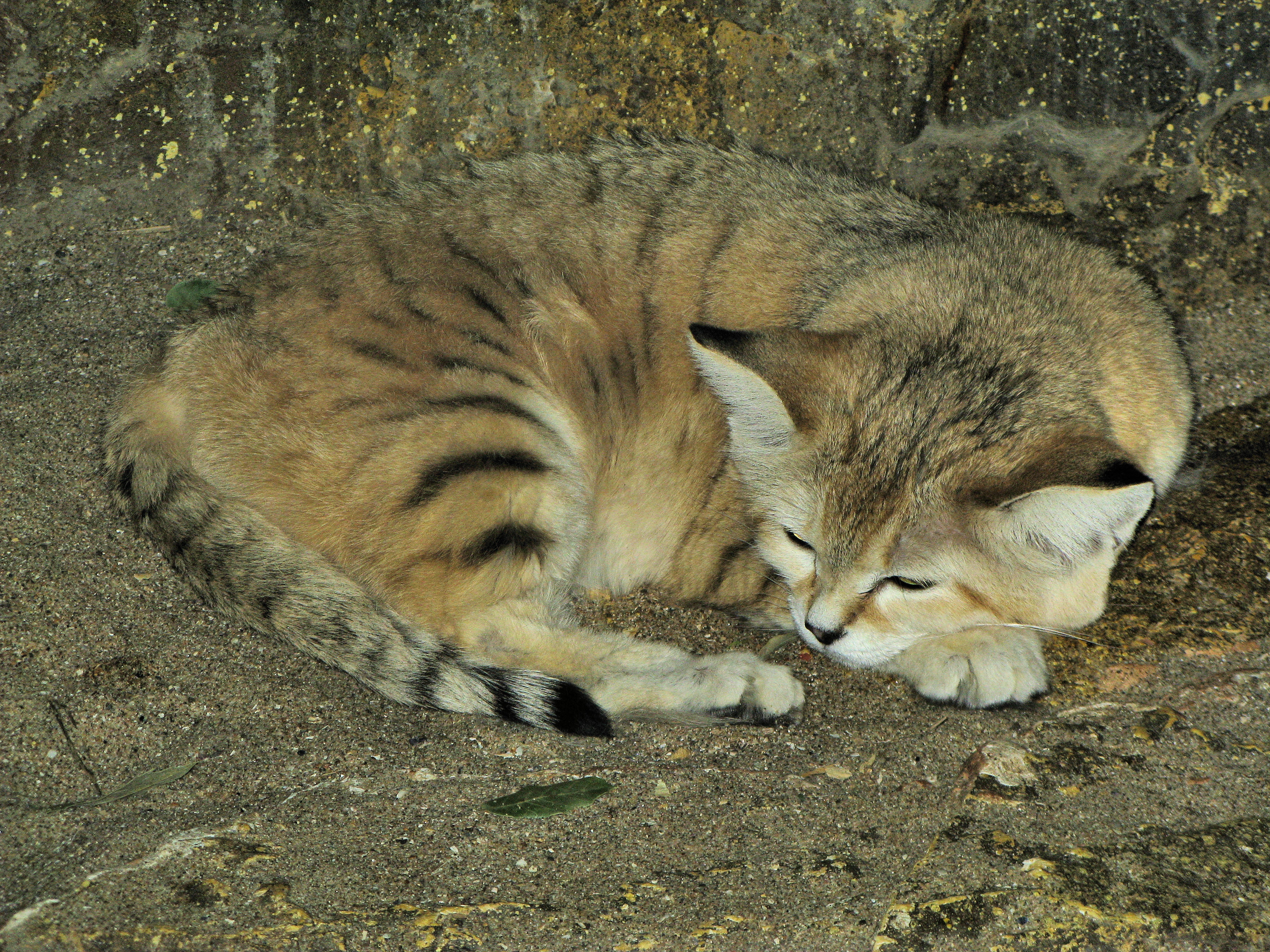
Sand cat in Bristol Zoo

Since the mid-1960s, sand cats were captured in Pakistan for trade and export to Europe until the Pakistani government ceased issuing permits in 1974. Captive sand cats are highly sensitive to respiratory diseases and infection of the upper respiratory tract. This is the main cause of death in adults. The most common disease is feline viral rhinotracheitis; since sand cats are very susceptible to respiratory diseases, they have to be kept in very arid enclosures, where humidity and temperature do not fluctuate.

The captive population kept in the European Endangered Species Programme is offspring of 18 founders that originated almost exclusively on the Arabian Peninsula. Until December 2009, the global captive population comprised 200 individuals in 45 institutions, including 23 European zoos with 102 individuals. The captive population within the Species Survival Plan for sand cat is based on eight founders.

In 2010, two sand cat kittens were born at the Al Ain Zoo after the first procedure of in vitro fertilisation and transfer of frozen-thawed embryos into the oviducts of ovulating females.
