= Al-Khunfah Natural Reserve =

Natural reservation in Saudi Arabia

Al-Khunfah Natural Reserve is a protected area in Saudi Arabia managed by the Saudi Wildlife Authority.

== Overview ==
Al-Khunfah Natural Reserve is located on the edge of Nafud desert covering an area of 19339.0 km². The reserve was listed as designated as a natural reserve in 1987.

== Birdlife ==
The reserve is a habitat to a diversity of birds such as lappet-faced vulture, sandgrouse, rock doves and houbara bustard.

== See also ==
- List of protected areas of Saudi Arabia
