= At-Taysiyah Natural Reserve =

Saudi national nature reserve

At-Taysiyah Natural Reserve is a protected area in Saudi Arabia managed by the Saudi Wildlife Authority.

== Overview ==
The natural reserve is situated to the north-eastern of Saudi Arabia with an area of 4272.2 km². It was designated as a natural reserve in 1995.

== Nature ==
The geographic patterns of the reserve include dune areas, shallow valleys and steppe desert. Due to its nature, the reserve becomes a destination for migrant houbara bustards during the winter. The reserve is also home to Reem Gazelle, Ostrich, and Arabian oryx.

== See also ==
- List of protected areas of Saudi Arabia
