= Nafud al-ʽUrayq Natural Reserve =

Saudi national nature reserve

Coordinates: 24.97°N 42.49°E

Nafud al-ʽUrayq Natural Reserve is a protected area in Saudi Arabia managed by the Saudi Wildlife Authority.

== Overview ==
The natural reserve is located in Najd in central Saudi Arabia and occupying approximately 2036.1 km^{2}. It was listed as a protected area in 1995.

== Flora and wildlife ==
The reserve is characterized by floras of Haloxylon salicornicum and Calligonum. It is also a habitat to the Houbara bustard, hyaena, and wolf.

== See also ==
- List of protected areas of Saudi Arabia
