= Horah Al-Horah Reserve =

Saudi national nature reserve

Horah Al-Horah Reserve is a nature reserve area in Saudi Arabia managed by the Saudi Wildlife Authority and is one of the first reserves established by the authority in 1987.

== Overview ==
The reserve occupies approximately 13,775 km^{2} and its surface consists of a volcanic plateau rich in black basaltic rocks and includes a range of low volcanic mountains with heights between 800 and 1,150 meters above sea level

== Flora and wildlife ==
Horah Al-Horah Reserve is characterised by diverse vegetation, consisting of perennial and annual plants scattered in the torrent streams and its sides. Flora variations include Lycium Shawii, Tamarix, Arabian Calligonum as well as a plethora of Annual Plants. It is also habitat to the Arabian Wolf, Red Fox, Desert Fox, Goitered Gazelle, Striped Hyena, Hare and Jerboa. As for birds, the reserve is home to Chlamydotis, Golden Eagle, Curlews and nine species of Alauda, in addition to a number of migratory birds. There are some reptile species that live in the protected area as well

== See also ==
- List of protected areas of Saudi Arabia
