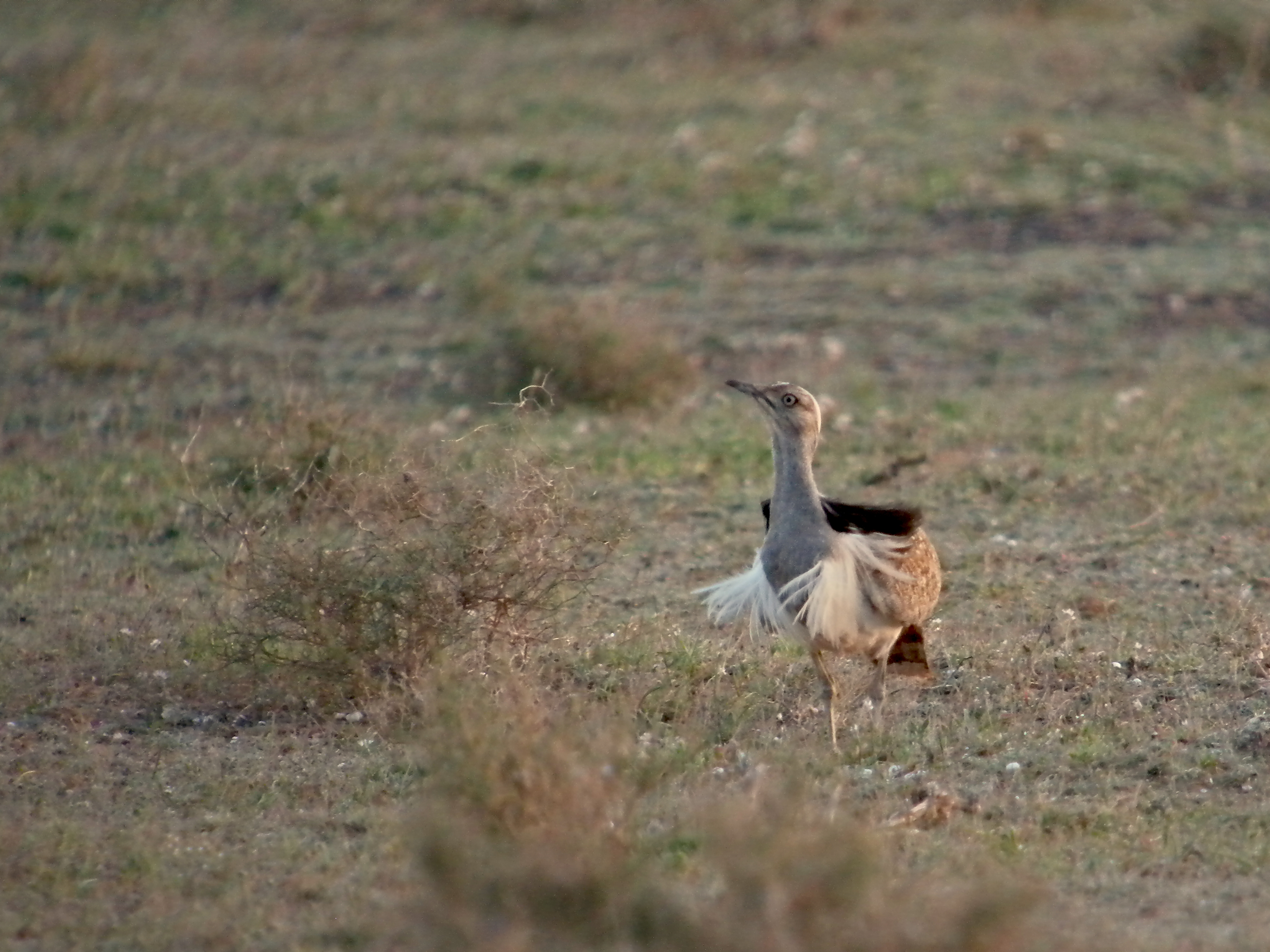
- On Lanzarote, Canary Islands, Spain

Conservation status
- Endangered (IUCN 3.1)

Scientific classification
- Kingdom: Animalia
- Phylum: Chordata
- Class: Aves
- Order: Otidiformes
- Family: Otididae
- Genus: Chlamydotis
- Species: C. undulata
- Subspecies: C. u. fuertaventurae

Trinomial name
- Chlamydotis undulata fuertaventurae Rothschild & Hartert, 1894

= Canarian houbara =

Subspecies of bird

The Canarian houbara (Chlamydotis undulata fuertaventurae) is a large bird in the bustard family. It is a houbara bustard subspecies which is endemic to the eastern Canary archipelago, in Macaronesia in the North Atlantic Ocean, where it is a scarce and threatened non-migratory resident. It is the animal symbol of the island of Fuerteventura.

== Taxonomy ==
The Canarian houbara is one of three subspecies of the houbara bustard. Archaeological evidence indicates that it has been present in the Canary Islands for 130–170,000 years. However, genetic data point to a more recent separation of C. u. fuertaventurae from the nominate subspecies around 20–25,000 years ago. It suggests that there was an initial colonisation of the Canary Islands about 130,000 years ago, followed by a second colonisation 19-30 000 years ago, with subsequent isolation until today.

== Description ==
The Canarian houbara is distinguished from the other two subspecies by its smaller size, less sandy colouring, and darker and more extensive markings on the back. It is the largest bird native to the Canary Islands.

== Distribution and habitat ==
Houbaras are restricted to the islands of Fuerteventura, Lobos, Lanzarote and Graciosa, though it is uncertain as to whether they continue to exist on Lobos. In the past, they also inhabited the islands of Tenerife and Gran Canaria, where they are now extinct. Annual rainfall in their range is less than 140 mm (5.5 in) while mean monthly temperatures range between 16 °C (61 °F) in January–February and 24 °C (75 °F) in August–September. They inhabit semi-arid plains, rocky hills and immobile dunes, sparsely vegetated with bushes and grasses. They will sometimes feed in farmland in the early morning and at dusk, but avoid human settlements, cornfields, forests and lava flows.

== Behaviour ==
=== Breeding ===
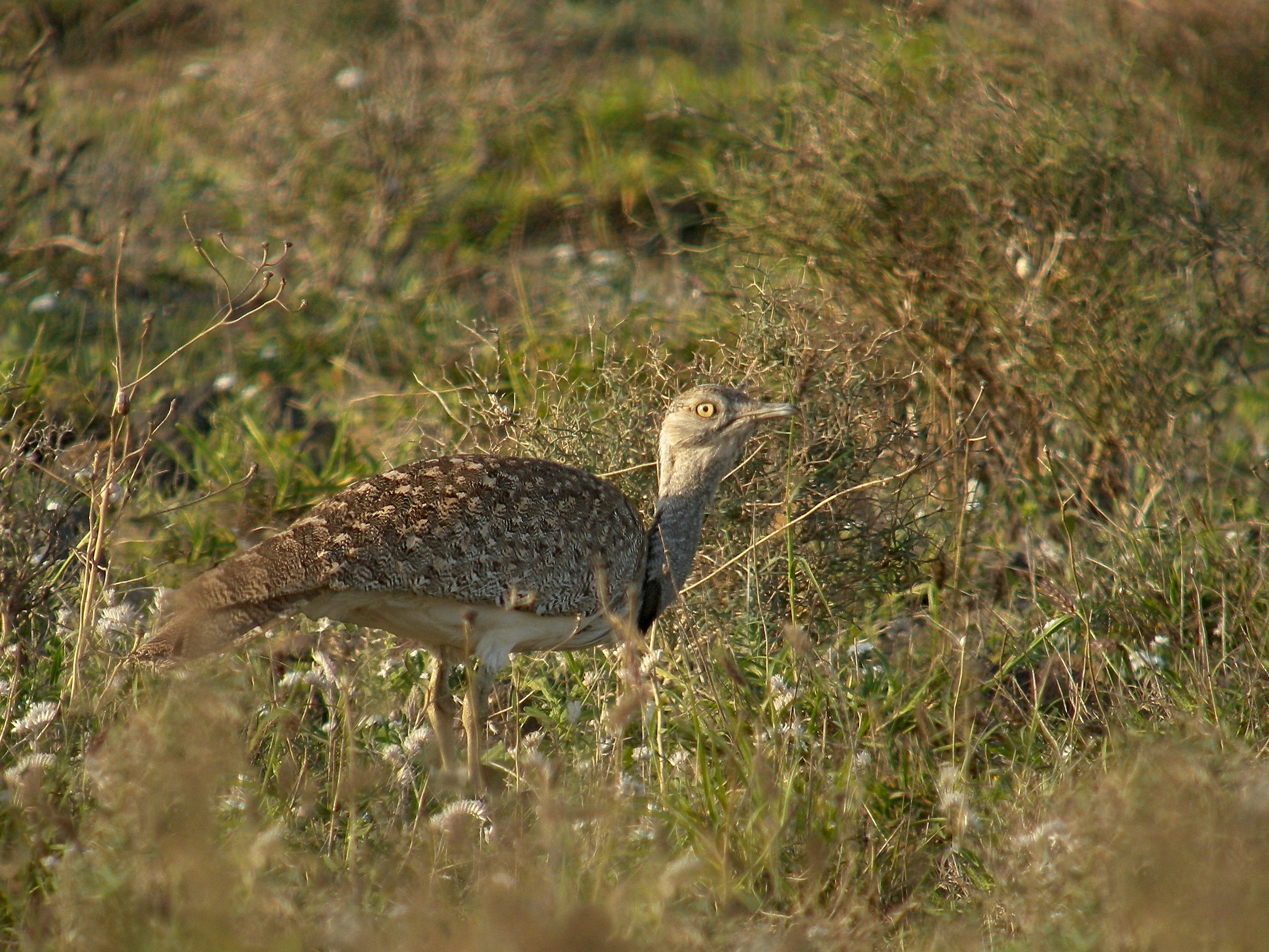
On Lanzarote, Canary Islands, Spain

Outside the breeding season the birds may be gregarious and forage in small parties. However, when breeding, males hold and defend individual territories for courtship display some 500–1000 m across. During this period both sexes tend to be solitary, only coming together for mating. Courtship takes place from December to March with the male displaying his head and throat plumage while strutting in a line or circle. The female lays two or three eggs in a scrape on the ground between February and April. Males are probably polygynous and do not help to rear the young. The chicks are nidifugous and accompany the female after hatching. Usually only one chick survives from each clutch, rarely two.

=== Feeding ===
The birds are omnivorous, feeding on the ground and consuming a variety of arthropods, molluscs and smaller vertebrates as well as plant material. The chicks require insects in order to grow properly.

== Status and conservation ==
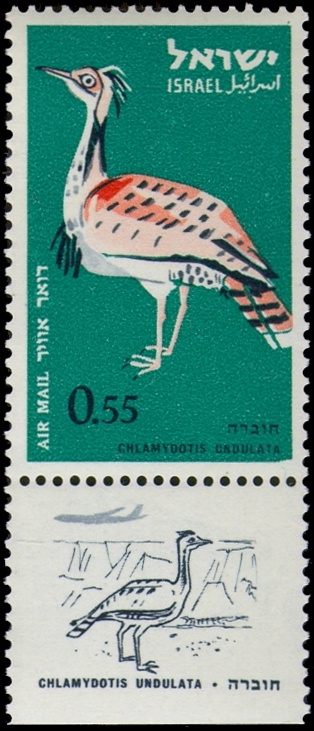
Israeli postal stamp, 1963

The Action Plan published in 1995 estimated the total population of Canarian houbaras at about 700–750 birds, comprising 300–350 on Fuerteventura and Lobos, and 400 on Lanzarote and Graciosa. However a later study estimated the number of birds on Fuerteventura at 177. Although they are classified as endangered on the Spanish Bird Red List, and are protected by legislation, they are threatened by several factors, including habitat destruction from development, increased disturbance from tourism, illegal hunting, collisions with powerlines and disturbance by truffle collectors.

== See also ==
- List of animal and plant symbols of the Canary Islands
