= Umm al-Qamari Islands =

Saudi national nature reserve

Umm al-Qamari islands in Saudi Arabia
- IUCN category Ia (strict nature reserve)
- Interactive map of Umm al-Qamari islands in Saudi Arabia
- Location: Saudi Arabia
- Nearest city: Al Qunfudhah
- Established: 1977
- Governing body: Saudi Wildlife Authority

Umm al-Qamari Islands in Saudi Arabia is a national nature reserve managed by the Saudi Wildlife Authority.

== Overview ==
Umm al-Qamari islands are located south of Alqunfutha, a city on the coast of the Red sea. It has an area of 4.03 km². The islands were listed as a protected area in 1977 to be the first protected area in Saudi Arabia.

== Birdlife ==
The reserve is home to a variety of birdlife, mostly collared doves and turtle doves for which the islands were named. There are other birds breed and live in the islands such as Herons, Pelicans, Gulls and Osprey.

== See also ==
- List of protected areas of Saudi Arabia
