= Saja Umm Ar-Rimth Natural Reserve =

Saja Umm Ar-Rimth Natural Reserve is a protected area in Saudi Arabia managed by the Saudi Wildlife Authority.

== Overview ==
The natural reserve is located in central Saudi Arabia with an area of 6,528.2 km^{2} (2,520.6 sq mi). It was designated as a natural reserve in 1995.

== Birdlife ==
The reserve is a destination for migrant Houbara. In 1998 the reserve is selected as a site for Houbara re-introduction.

== See also ==
- List of protected areas of Saudi Arabia
