= Shada Mountain Reserve =

Saudi national nature reserve

Shada Mountain Reserve is a natural reserve in Saudi Arabia managed by the Saudi Wildlife Authority. The reserve is home to key plant and animal species including the endangered Arabian leopard.

== Overview ==
The 68.62 km² area reserve is located in Al Baha with an altitude up to 2,222 meters above sea level. It was listed as a protected reserve in 2002.

== Plant and animal species ==
The reserve is known for the largest variety of flora in the region. There are approximately 500 plant species reported in this reserve. The Arabian leopard, one of the endangered species, is inhabiting this reserve. There are other species in this reserve including Arabian wolf, caracal, rock fox, striped hyaena and genet.

== See also ==
- List of protected areas of Saudi Arabia
