= Majami'al-Hadb Reserve =

Saudi national nature reserve

Majami'al-Hadb Reserve is a protected area in Saudi Arabia managed by the Saudi Wildlife Authority.

== Overview ==
The 3400 km² protected area is situated to the north of Najd in central Saudi Arabia. It was listed as a protected area in 1993 to preserve plant and animal species in this area.

== Wildlife ==
Majami'al-Hadb reserve is characterized by a landscape of granite and pyroclastic domes. The animal species inhabiting this reserve are the Arabian wolf, Ruppell's fox, ratel, hare, rock hyrax, caracal, and mongoose.

== See also ==
- List of protected areas of Saudi Arabia
