= General Authority of Meteorology and Environmental Protection =

Government agency in Saudi Arabia

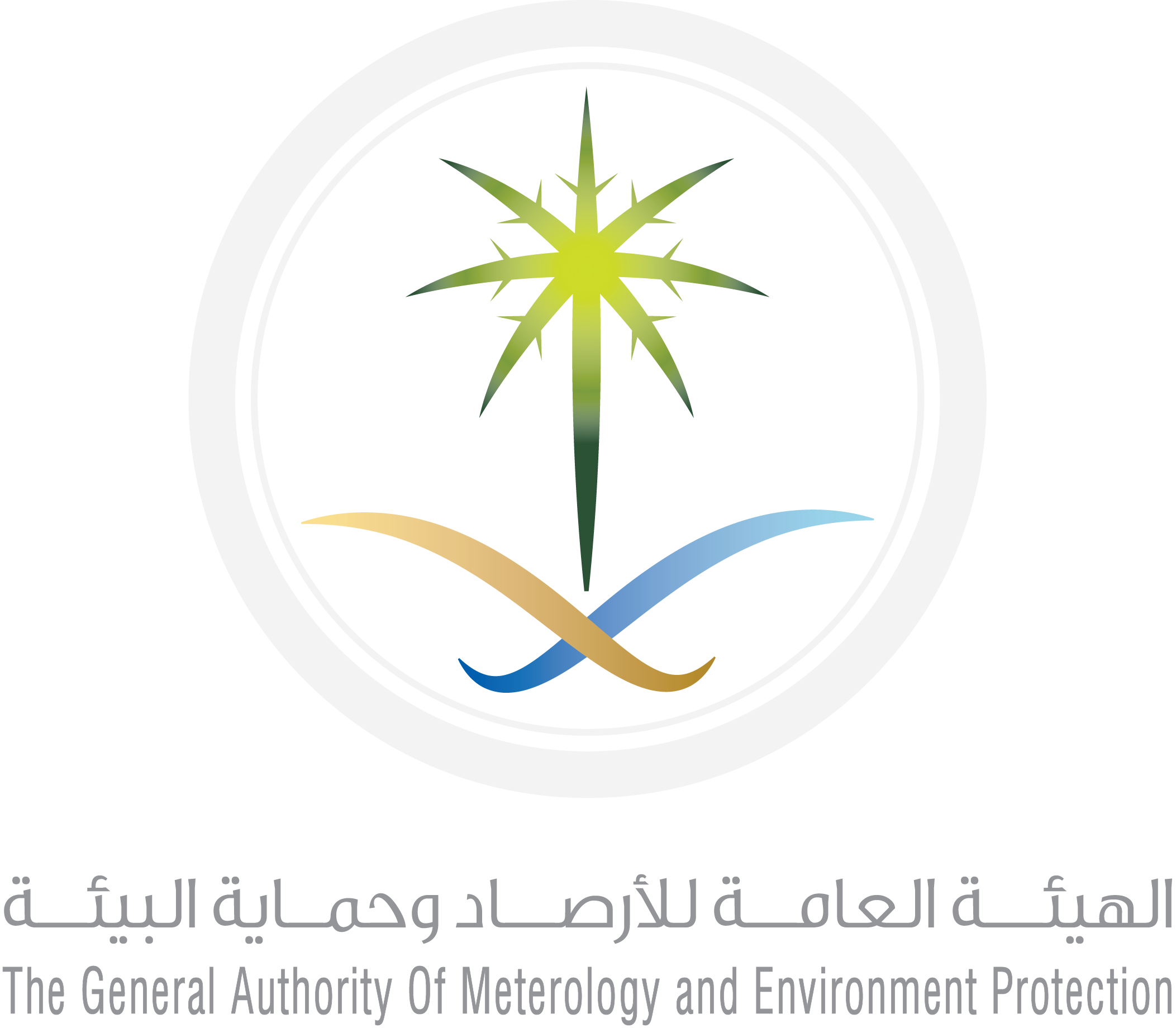

Authority overview
- Formed: 1950
- Dissolved: March 26, 2019
- Superseding agencies: National Center for Meteorology; National Center for Wildlife; National Center for Environmental Compliance; National Center for Plant Covering Development and Combating of Desertification
- Jurisdiction: Saudi Arabia
- Headquarters: Jeddah, Saudi Arabia
- Website: ncm.gov.sa

The General Authority of Meteorology and Environmental Protection was a government body responsible for environmental issues, meteorological information and weather prediction in Saudi Arabia.

== History ==
When the Directorate of Military Affairs was established in 1930, it involved the Meteorology affairs before it separated to an independent entity called Directorate of Meteorology. in 1950 the Directorate of Meteorology was transformed to the General of Meteorology and the Civil Aviation Authority whereas later in 1981 become the Meteorology Department and Environmental Protection Administration. in 2011, it was amended to the General Presidency of Meteorology and Environment Protection and eventually in 2016, it was changed to the General Authority of Meteorology and Environmental Protection.

In March 2019, the authority was officially dissolved by the council of ministers. The National Center for Meteorology, National Center for Wildlife, National Center for Vegetation Cover Development and Combatting Desertification, and National Center for Environmental Compliance were created in its place.

== Responsibilities ==
The authority is responsible for many tasks including:

- Developing and issuing the regulations and legislation that aims at the preservation of natural resources.
- Protection and preservation of the environment in the Kingdom
- Issuing early warnings of expected extreme weather events.
- Analyzing and evaluating the influences of some activities on the environment and proposing solutions.
