= Presa Canario =

Spanish breed of dog

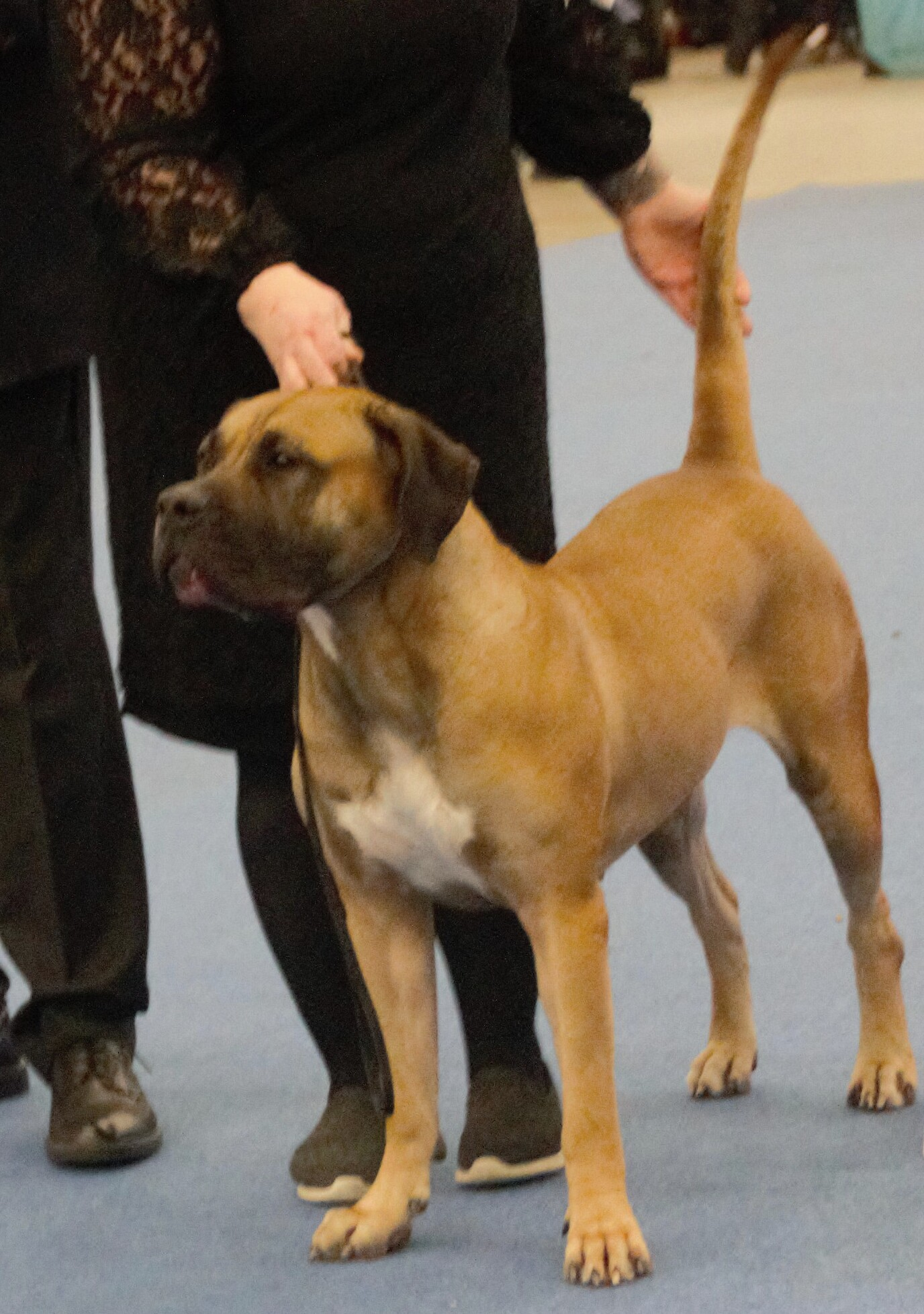
- Fawn bitch

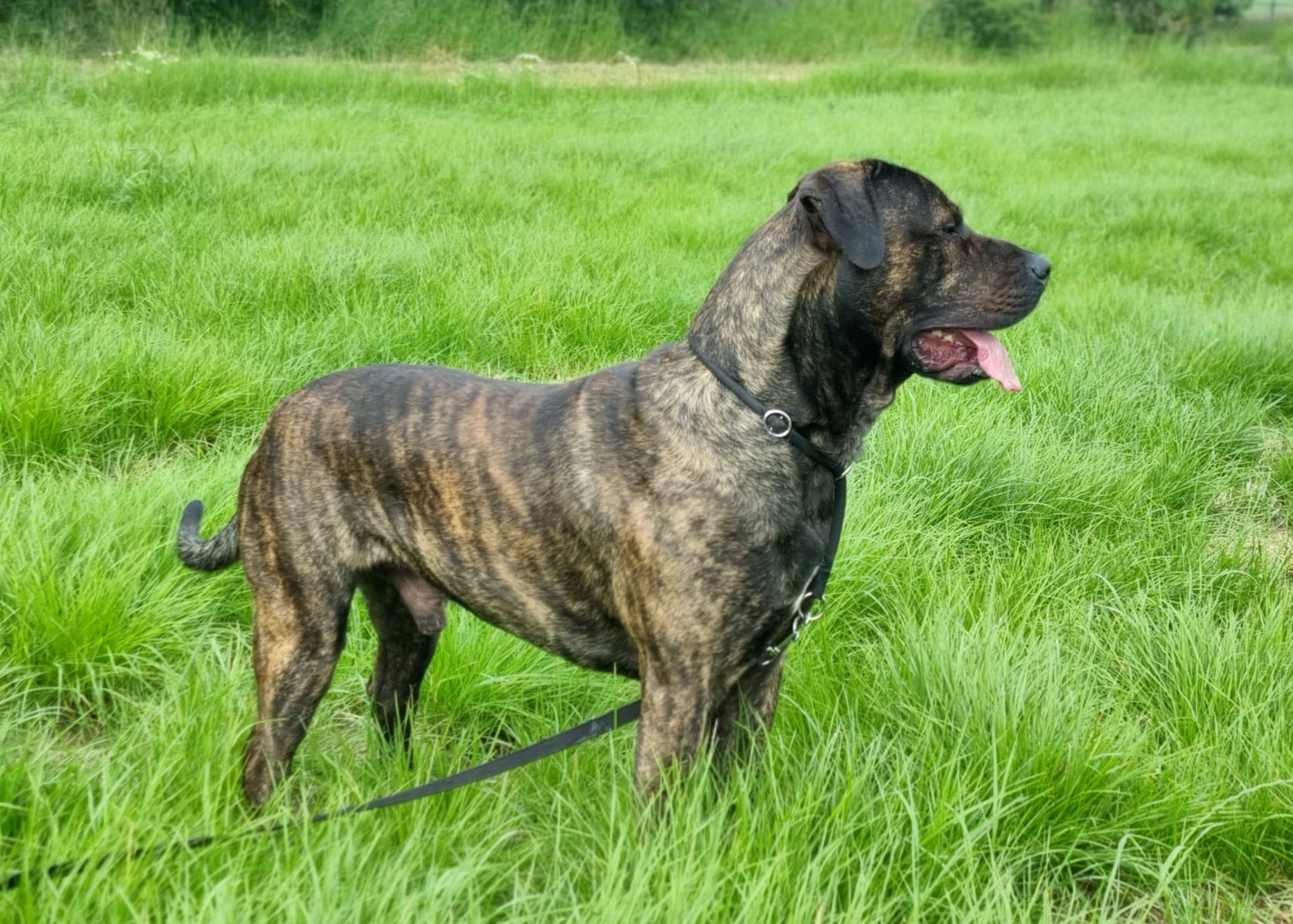
- Brindle dog
- Other names: Dogo Canario; Perro de Presa Canario; Canary Mastiff; Canary Catch Dog; Canarian Dogo
- Origin: Spain
- Distribution: Canary Islands
Traits
Height	Males	61–66 cm (24–26 in)
	Females	57–62 cm (22–24 in)
Weight	Males	45–57 kg (100–125 lb)
	Females	40–50 kg (90–110 lb)
- Colour: fawn, brindle, or black
Kennel club standards
- Real Sociedad Canina de España: standard
- Fédération Cynologique Internationale: standard

The Presa Canario is a Spanish breed of large dog of mastiff or catch dog type. It originates in the Spanish autonomous community of the Canary Islands, and is found mostly in the islands of Gran Canaria and Tenerife. It was formerly known as the Dogo Canario. It was traditionally used as a guard dog, as a herding dog for both sheep and cattle, and for dog-fighting, which was legal in Spain until 1936 and may have continued clandestinely thereafter.

== History ==
The Presa Canario derives from the Bardino Majorero, which was formerly distributed throughout the Canary Islands. Dogs of this type were cross-bred with various dogs of molossoid type introduced to the islands at different times during the colonial period. The Presa Canario was particularly influenced by dogs brought from the British Isles with the large influx of British residents in the late nineteenth century.

By the 1960s it was close to extinction. A breed society, the Club Español del Presa Canario, was formed in 1982, and drew up a provisional breed standard, which was published by the government of the islands. The standard was approved by the Real Sociedad Canina de España in 1989. In 1991 the dog was included in an official list of animal and plant symbols of the Canary Islands as a symbol of the island of Gran Canaria. It was officially recognised by the Spanish national government in 2001.

The breed was provisionally accepted by the Fédération Cynologique Internationale in 2001 under the name Dogo Canario, and was definitively accepted in 2011. In December 2018, at the request of the Real Sociedad Canina de España, the name was changed to Presa Canario. It was included in the Foundation Stock Service of the American Kennel Club in 1996.

Importation and sale of the dogs is prohibited in Australia and New Zealand.

== Characteristics ==
The Presa Canario is a large dog with a robust muscular body. According to the revised international standard published in 2023, dogs should stand 61–66 cm at the withers and weigh some 45–57 kg; bitches stand about 57–62 cm, with weights in the range 40–50 kg. The previous standard, dated 2018, specified heavier weights, particularly for dogs (50–65 kg), and slightly lower minimum heights.

The head is broad, massive, square, and powerful brachycephalic shape. If cropped, the ears stand erect. In countries where ear-cropping is banned, the ears are close fitting to the head; they hang down and should be pendant or "rose"-shaped. The upper lip is pendulous, although not excessively so. Seen from the front, the upper and lower lips come together to form an inverted v. The flews are slightly divergent. The inside of the lips is a dark colour.

A study of dogs in the United Kingdom found a median longevity for the breed of 7.7 years, markedly lower than the median of 12.5 for all dogs.

== Use ==
The Presa Canario was traditionally used as a guard dog, as a herding dog for cattle, and for dog-fighting, which was legal in Spain until 1936 and may have continued clandestinely thereafter.
