= List of protected areas of Saudi Arabia =

This is a list of protected areas of Saudi Arabia, some of which are managed by the Saudi Wildlife Authority.:

- At-Taysiyah Protected Area
- Jabal Shada Nature Reserve
- Majami'al-Hadb Protected Area
- Nafud al-'Urayq
- Raydah Natural Reserve
- 'Uruq Bani Ma'arid
- Saja Umm Ar-Rimth Natural Reserve
- Harrat al-Harrah Protected Area
- Al-Khunfah Natural Reserve
- Ibex Reserve Protected Area
- Mahazat as-Sayd Protected Area
- Umm al-Qamari Islands
- Al-Tubayq Natural Reserve
- Farasan Islands Protected Area
- Jubail Marine Wildlife Sanctuary
- Jabal Aja Protected Area
- Wadi Turabah Nature Reserve
