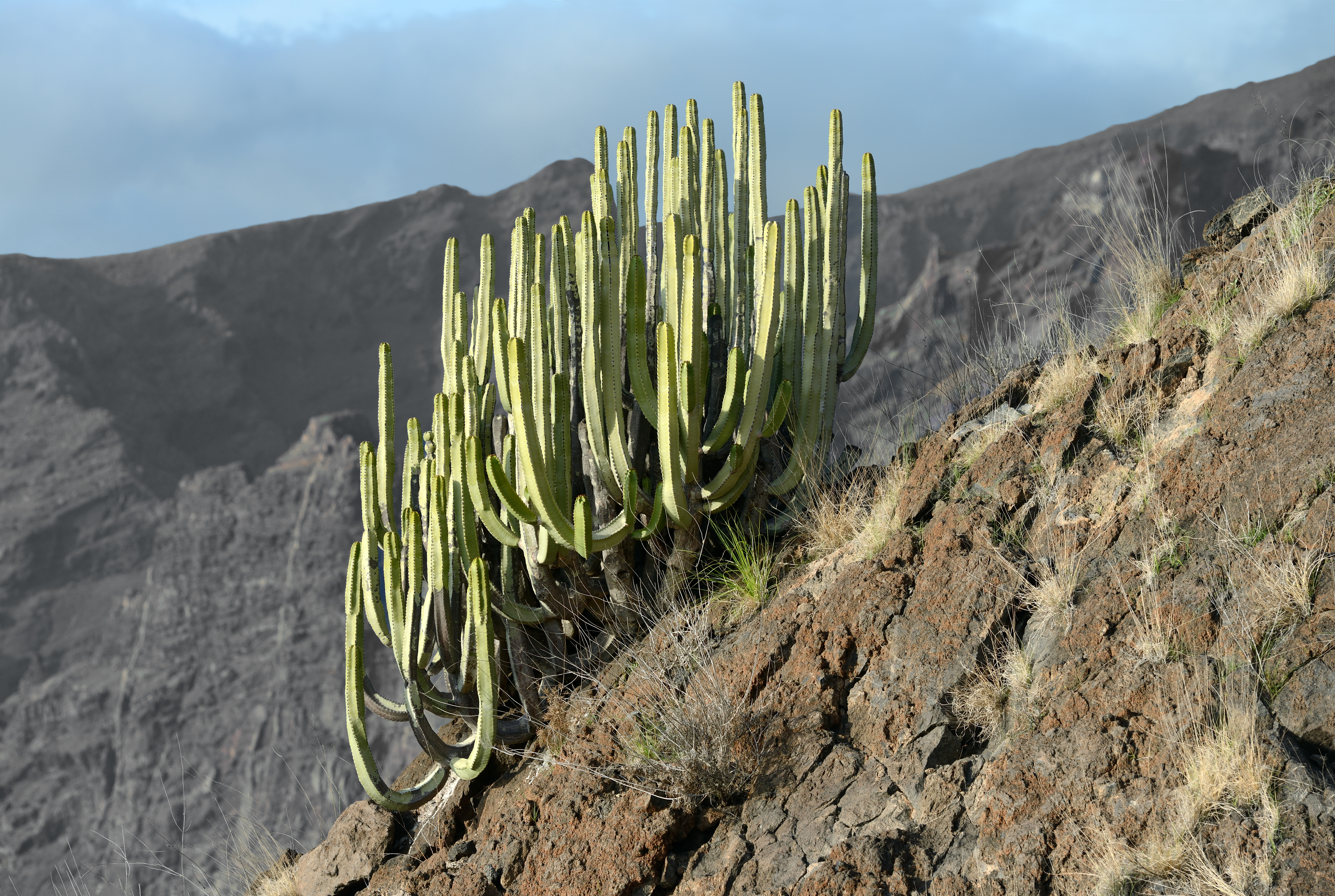
- Canary Island spurge close to the Mirador de Archipenque at Los Gigantes

Conservation status
- Least Concern (IUCN 3.1)
- CITES Appendix II

Scientific classification
- Kingdom: Plantae
- Clade: Embryophytes
- Clade: Tracheophytes
- Clade: Spermatophytes
- Clade: Angiosperms
- Clade: Eudicots
- Clade: Rosids
- Order: Malpighiales
- Family: Euphorbiaceae
- Genus: Euphorbia
- Species: E. canariensis

Binomial name
- Euphorbia canariensis L.

Synonyms
- Euphorbia canariensis Forssk. Euphorbia canariensis Thunb. Euphorbia canariensis Tremaut; Tithymalus quadrangularis Kigg

= Euphorbia canariensis =

Species of flowering plant in the spurge family

Euphorbia canariensis, commonly known as the Canary Island spurge, Hercules club or in Spanish cardón, is a succulent member of the genus Euphorbia and family Euphorbiaceae endemic to the Canary Islands. It is the plant symbol of the island of Gran Canaria.

== Description ==
The Canary Island spurge is a succulent shrub, growing to between 3 and 4 metres (10 and 13 ft) high. It is made up of fleshy quadrangular or pentagonal trunks that look like cacti. It has no leaves, instead bearing spines 5 to 14 millimetres (0.20 to 0.55 in) long. It produces reddish-green flowers. It is hardy to −2 °C (28 °F).

The latex, which contains diterpenes is poisonous.

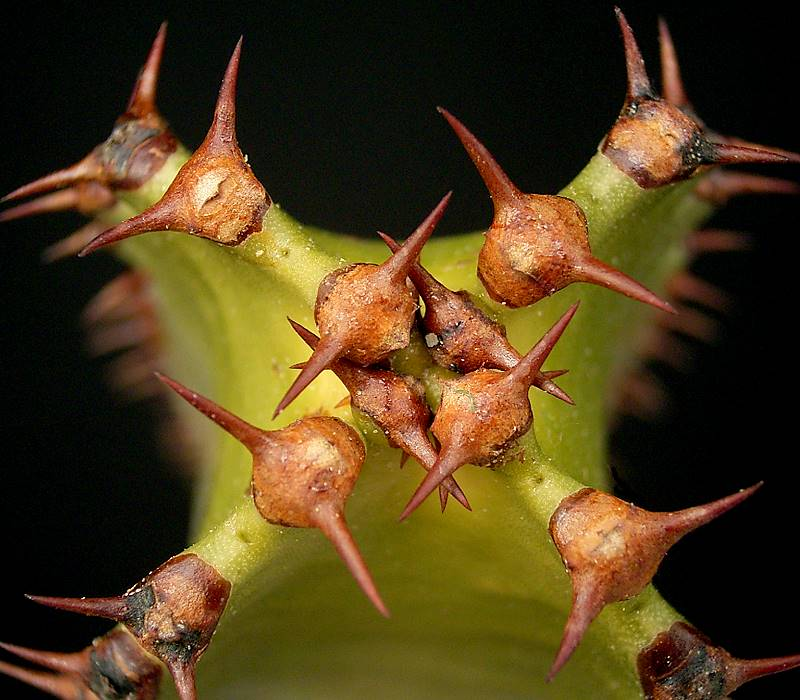
Spines on a young shoot

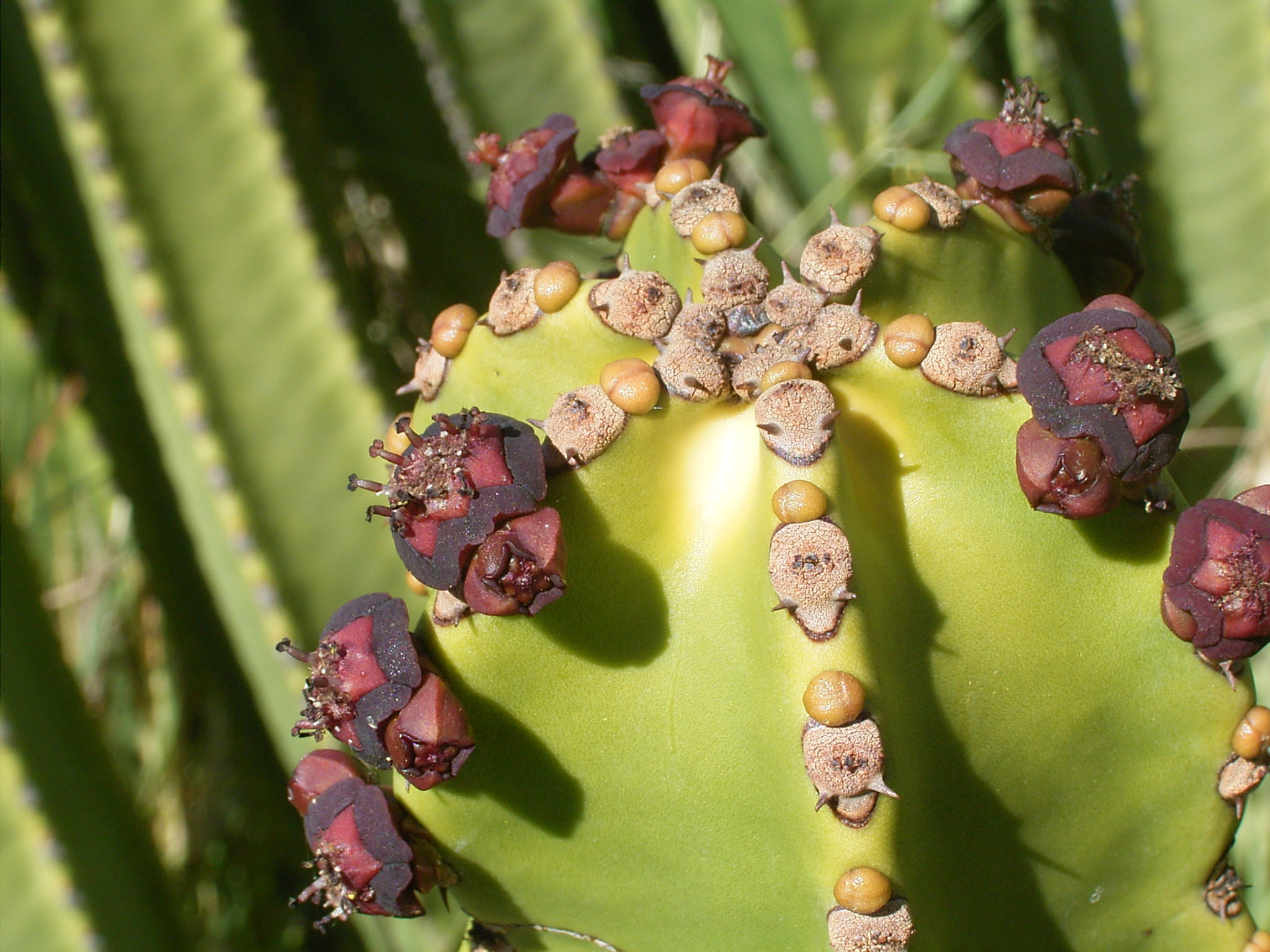
Flowers

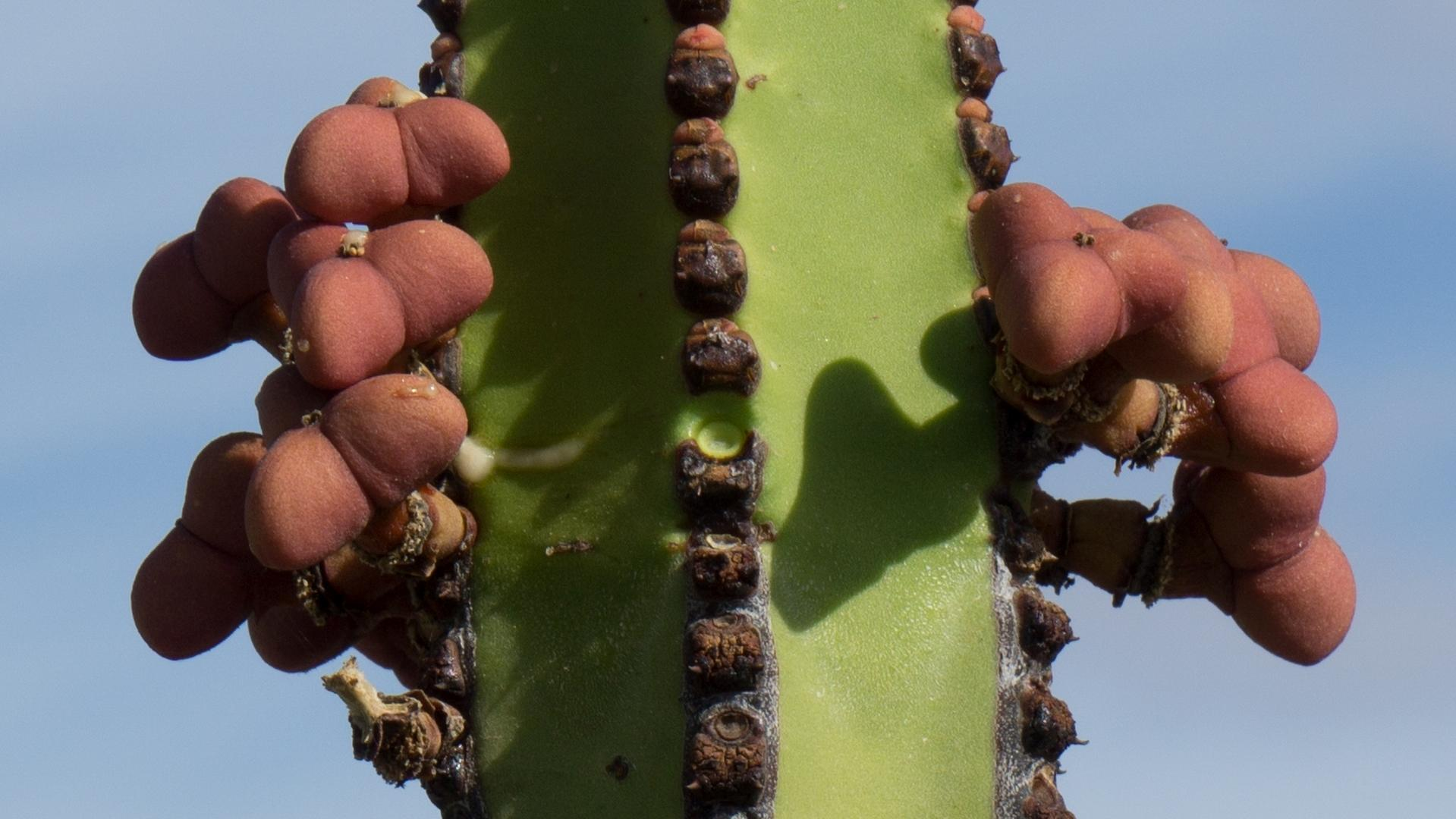
Fruit

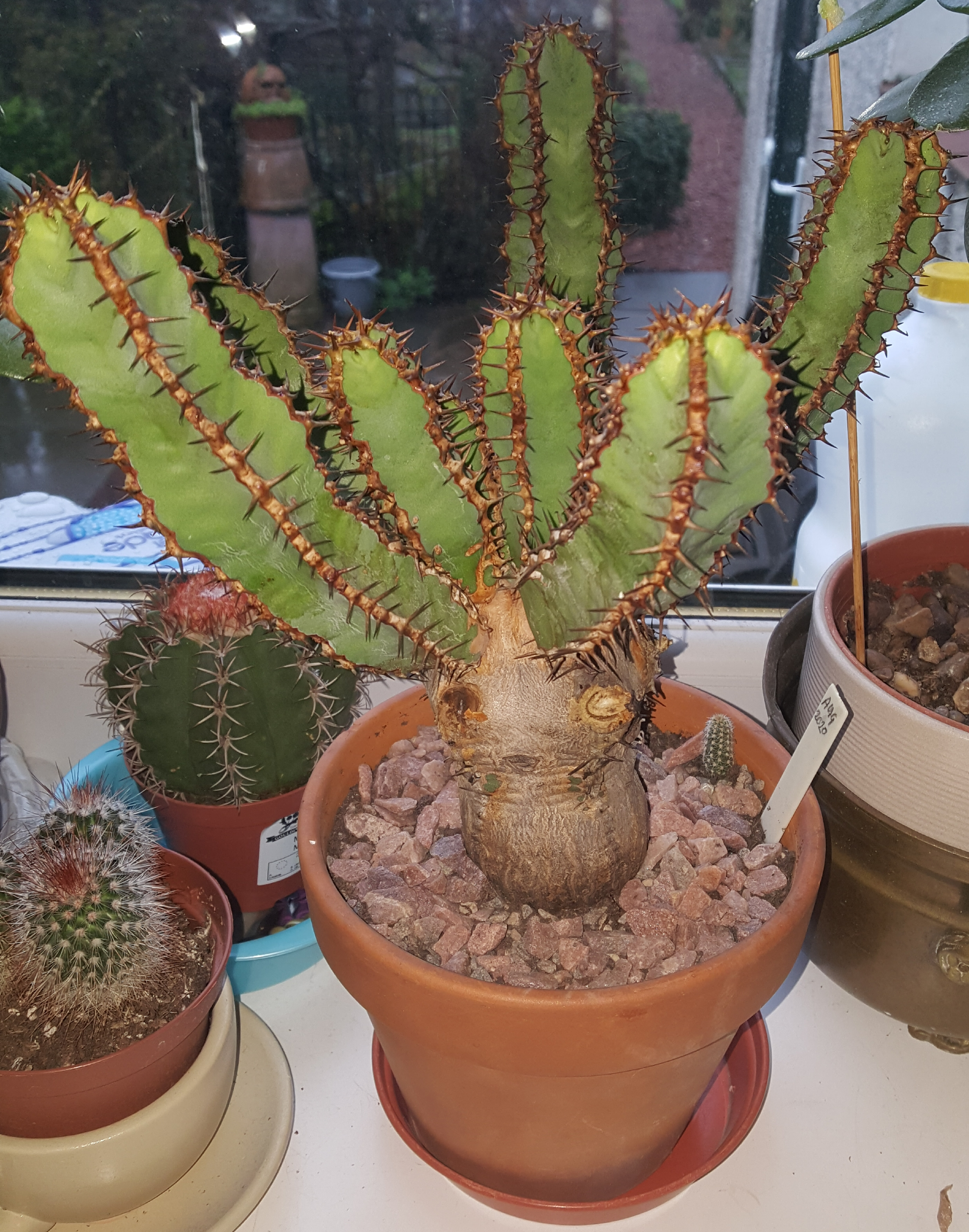

== Distribution ==
The species is found on the narrow coastal belt, from sea level to 1,100 metres (3,600 ft) in the Canary Islands.

== See also ==
- List of animal and plant symbols of the Canary Islands
