= List of animal and plant symbols of the Canary Islands =

This is a list of animal and plant symbols of the Canary Islands as a whole and each of the islands. These species were established as symbols by Decree Law of April 30, 1991 by the Government of the Canary Islands.

Animal and plant symbol of the archipelago as a whole:

Region	Natural symbols	Image
Canary Islands	Serinus canaria (Atlantic canary) and Phoenix canariensis (Canary Island date palm)	

Animal and plant symbol of each of the islands:

Island	Natural symbols	Image
El Hierro	Gallotia simonyi machadoi (El Hierro giant lizard) and Juniperus phoenicea (Sabina)	
La Gomera	Columba junoniae (Laurel pigeon) and Persea indica (Viñátigo)	
La Palma	Pyrrhocorax pyrrhocorax barbarus (Graja) and Pinus canariensis (Canary Island pine)	
Tenerife	Fringilla teydea (Tenerife blue chaffinch) and Dracaena draco (Drago)	
Gran Canaria	Canis lupus familiaris (Canary Mastiff) and Euphorbia canariensis (Canary Island spurge)	
Fuerteventura	Chlamydotis undulata fuertaventurae (Canarian houbara) and Euphorbia handiensis (Cardón de Jandía)	
Lanzarote	Munidopsis polymorpha (Blind albino cave crab) and Euphorbia balsamifera (Tabaiba dulce)	
