= King Salman Bin Abdulaziz Royal Natural Reserve =

Natural reserve in Saudi Arabia

- Location within Saudi Arabia
- Location: Saudi Arabia
- Nearest city: Sakakah, Saudi Arabia
- Coordinates: 27°58′11″N 39°12′00″E
- Area: 32,296,673 acres (130,700.00 km^{2})
- Established: 2018
- Governing body: King Salman bin Abdulaziz Natural Royal Reserve Development authority
- Website: ksrnr.gov.sa/en

The King Salman Bin Abdulaziz Royal Natural Reserve is a nature reserve located in the north of Saudi Arabia. It is the largest reserve in the kingdom at 130,700 square kilometres (50,500 sq mi). Within its borders are three protected areas: Al-Khanfa, Al-Tubaiq, and Hurra Al-Hurra. A royal decree was issued in June 2018 to include all three areas under the King Salman bin Abdulaziz Royal Reserve, headed by Prince Abdulaziz Bin Saud Bin Nayef Bin Abdulaziz Al Saud.

The reserve includes rare antiquities, some of which date back to 8000 BC, such as the areas of Jubbah and Kilwa.

On November 22, 2022 King Salman Bin Abdulaziz Royal Reserve was officially added to the World Database on Protected Areas (WDPA).

== King Salman Royal Natural Reserve Development Authority ==
King Salman Bin Abdulaziz Royal Reserve Development Authority was established by Cabinet Resolution No. (437) on February 25, 2020, which includes approval of the organizational arrangements of the Royal Reserves Council and the Royal Reserves Development Authority. In addition to the inclusion of the three protected areas (Al-Khanfa, Al-Tubaiq and Hurra Al-Hurra) and the areas between and adjacent to them into a royal reserve (King Salman Bin Abdulaziz Royal Reserve), whose board of directors is chaired by Prince Abdulaziz Bin Saud Bin Nayef Bin Abdulaziz.

== Borders ==
The reserve is bordered with Sakaka governorate and Domat al-Jandal in the eastern, Tabuk to the west, Tayma to the southwest, Hail to the southeast, and the Jordanian border to the north. The reserve is located within four administrative regions, which are Al-Jawf region, Hail region, Tabuk region, and the northern border. Several governorates and villages are located within the reserve borders, the most prominent of which are: Al-Qurayyat and Tabarjal in Al-Jawf region, and Tarif in the northern border region.

== Geographical and biological diversity ==
The reserve includes fourteen geographical formations including mountains, plains, and plateaus, and includes various valuable minerals.

There are at least 300 species of animals, including rare deer and various wild animals. There are more than 230 plant varieties of trees, desert flowering plants, and others.

== Hurra Al-Hurra ==
Hurra Al-Hurra is located in the north of the Kingdom of Saudi Arabia with the Jordanian borders, and east of Al-Sarhan valley, with an area of 13775 square km. It includes a number of animals such as the goitered gazelle, Arabian wolves, red foxes, sand foxes, striped hyenas, rabbits, and gerbils. In addition to the plants of tamarisk and bramble, lycium shawii, calligonum planets, and annual shrubs and herbs. It also includes birds such as bustards, golden eagles, curlews, and other types of resident and migratory birds.

== Al Khunafah ==
Al-Khanfa is located in the north of the Tayma in Governorate of the Tabuk region. It covers an area of 19,000 square kilometers. It includes a group of hills, reefs and valleys, and a group of animal species live in it, such as the Goitered gazelle, with a small number of mountain gazelle, foxes, hares, gerbils and types of endemic and migratory birds such as the houbara and the curlew.

== Al Tubayq ==
Tubayq is located in the northwest of the Kingdom with the Jordanian borders, and it covers an area of 12,105 km. It includes a group of mountains, valleys, reefs and khabars, in which acacia and lycium shawii abound. Caribou goat is one of the most prominent animals that live inside the area, along with the goitered gazelle, the Arabian wolf, foxes, the hare and some types of reptiles and endemic and migratory birds.

- King Salman bin Abdulaziz Royal Reserve
- Saudi Royal Reserves
- Wildlife in Saudi Arabia
