= Al-Tubayq Natural Reserve =

Protected area in Saudi Arabia

Al-Tubayq Natural Reserve is a protected area in Saudi Arabia managed by the Saudi Wildlife Authority.

== Overview ==
Al-Tubayq Natural Reserves is located in northwest Saudi Arabia, on the border with Jordan. It covers an area of 12,105.0 km^{2} (4,673.8 sq mi). The reserve was designated a natural reserve in 1989. The geography of the reserve is characterized by dark rugged rocks.

== Birdlife ==
The reserve is home to the Nubian Ibex as well as gazelles, wolves, foxes and hares. Birdlife inhabiting this reserve includes falcons, partridges, and eagles.

== See also ==
- List of protected areas of Saudi Arabia
