= National Center for Meteorology (Saudi Arabia) =

Weather research and forecasting organization

- المركز الوطني للأرصاد

Agency overview
- Formed: 26 March 2019; 7 years ago
- Preceding agency: General Authority of Meteorology and Environmental Protection
- Type: Meteorology center
- Jurisdiction: Saudi Arabia
- Headquarters: Jeddah, Saudi Arabia; 21.523335°N 39.209268°E
- Agency executive: Ayman Ghulam, CEO
- Parent agency: Ministry of Environment, Water, and Agriculture
- Website: ncm.gov.sa

The National Center for Meteorology (NCM; Arabic: المركز الوطني للأرصاد) is the national meteorological research and forecasting organization of Saudi Arabia, working under the Ministry of Environment, Water, and Agriculture of the Government of Saudi Arabia. The center was established in March 2019. The center is tasked with weather forecasting, issuing early warnings, and collaborating with other international meteorology institutions to employ the latest technologies.

In addition to its meteorological services, the center is responsible for cloud-seeding to increase the rate of precipitation in Saudi Arabia.

== History ==
The National Center of Meteorology was established in March 2019 during Council of Minister session No. 417, which saw the cancellation of General Authority of Meteorology and Environmental Protection. In addition to the meteorology center establishment, the session included the establishment of the Center for Wildlife, National Center for Environmental Compliance, National Center for Vegetation Cover Development and Combating Desertification.

== See also ==
- List of meteorology institutions
- National Center for Wildlife (Saudi Arabia)
