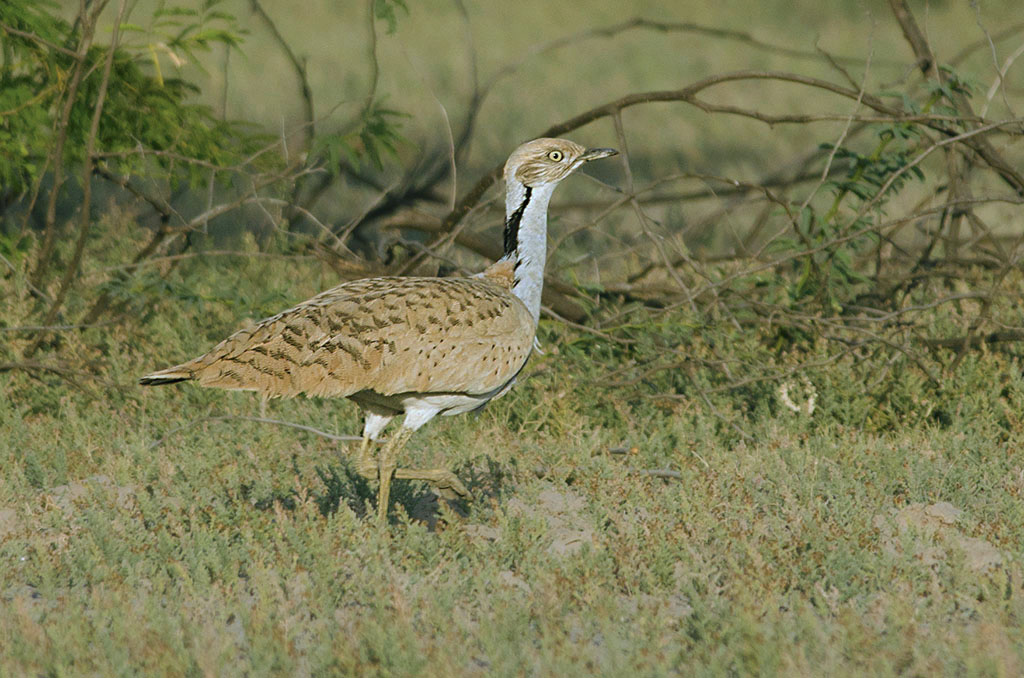
- Asian houbara wintering in India

Scientific classification
- Kingdom: Animalia
- Phylum: Chordata
- Class: Aves
- Order: Otidiformes
- Family: Otididae
- Genus: Chlamydotis; Lesson, 1839

Type species
- Otis houbara Desfontaines, 1787

Species
- See text

= Chlamydotis =

Genus of birds

Chlamydotis is a genus of large birds in the bustard family. The genus name is from Ancient Greek khlamus, a horseman's cloak with weights sewn into the corners, and otis, bustard.

Members of this genus show very little sexual dimorphism in their plumage. The clade consists of two extant species, formerly considered to be conspecific forms a sister group within the clade that includes the genus Otis.

Genus Chlamydotis – Lesson, 1839 – two species
| Common name | Scientific name and subspecies | Range | Size and ecology | IUCN status and estimated population |
|---|---|---|---|---|
| African houbara | Chlamydotis undulata (Jacquin, 1784) Two subspecies: C. u. fuertaventurae (Rothschild & Hartert 1894) (Canary Islands houbara); C. u. undulata (Jacquin 1784) (North African houbara) | north Africa, Canary Islands | Size: Habitat: Diet: | VU |
| Asian houbara | Chlamydotis macqueenii (Gray, JE, 1832) | Asia | Size: Habitat: Diet: | VU |

The genus was established by the French naturalist René Primevère Lesson in 1839 and included only one species which was formerly described in the genus Otis. The genus name of Houbara was used by Charles Lucien Bonaparte but this was dropped, being a nomen nudum, as not following the requirements for zoological names. The Asian houbara was split on the basis of distinctive display, differences in feather colours and on the basis of well established genetic differences. The two species are thought to have separated during a period of extreme aridity around 0.9 million years ago.

The African houbara breeds in the Canary Islands and north Africa. The Asian houbara occurs in southwestern Asia and along the dry region between the Caspian Sea and the Gobi Desert. The more northern populations have many birds migrating south in winter and MacQueen's has historically been known for its vagrancy and individuals have been found well outside their usual range. They breed in deserts and other arid sandy areas and are sensitive to human disturbance. Populations of both these bustards have been greatly reduced by hunting, falconry and human-induced habitat changes.
