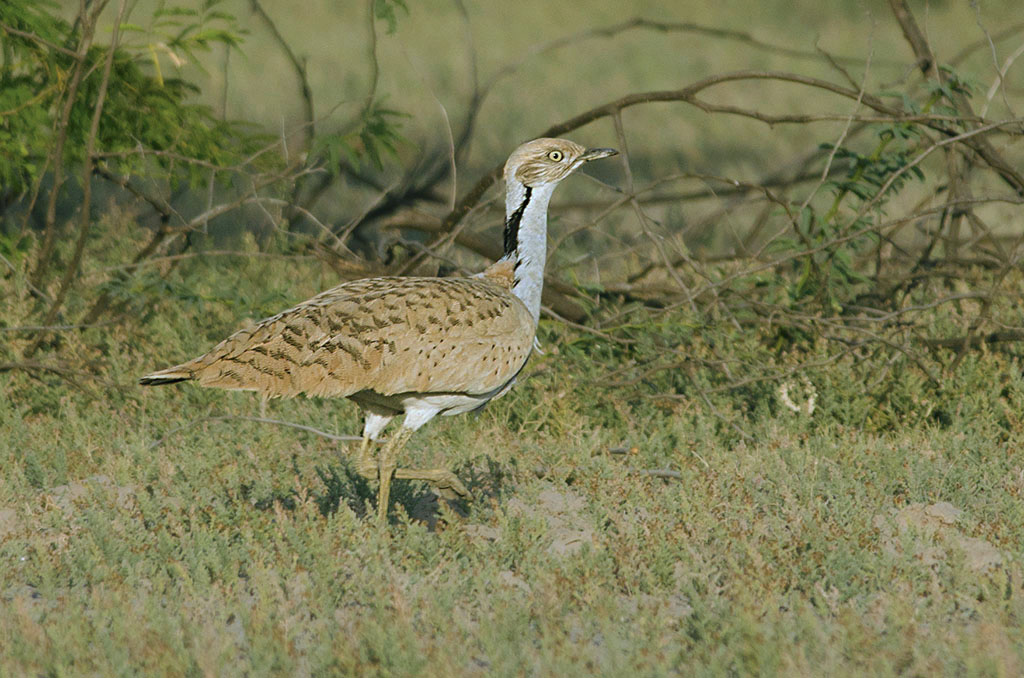

Conservation status
- Vulnerable (IUCN 3.1)

Scientific classification
- Kingdom: Animalia
- Phylum: Chordata
- Class: Aves
- Order: Otidiformes
- Family: Otididae
- Genus: Chlamydotis
- Species: C. macqueenii

Binomial name
- Chlamydotis macqueenii (Gray, JE, 1832)
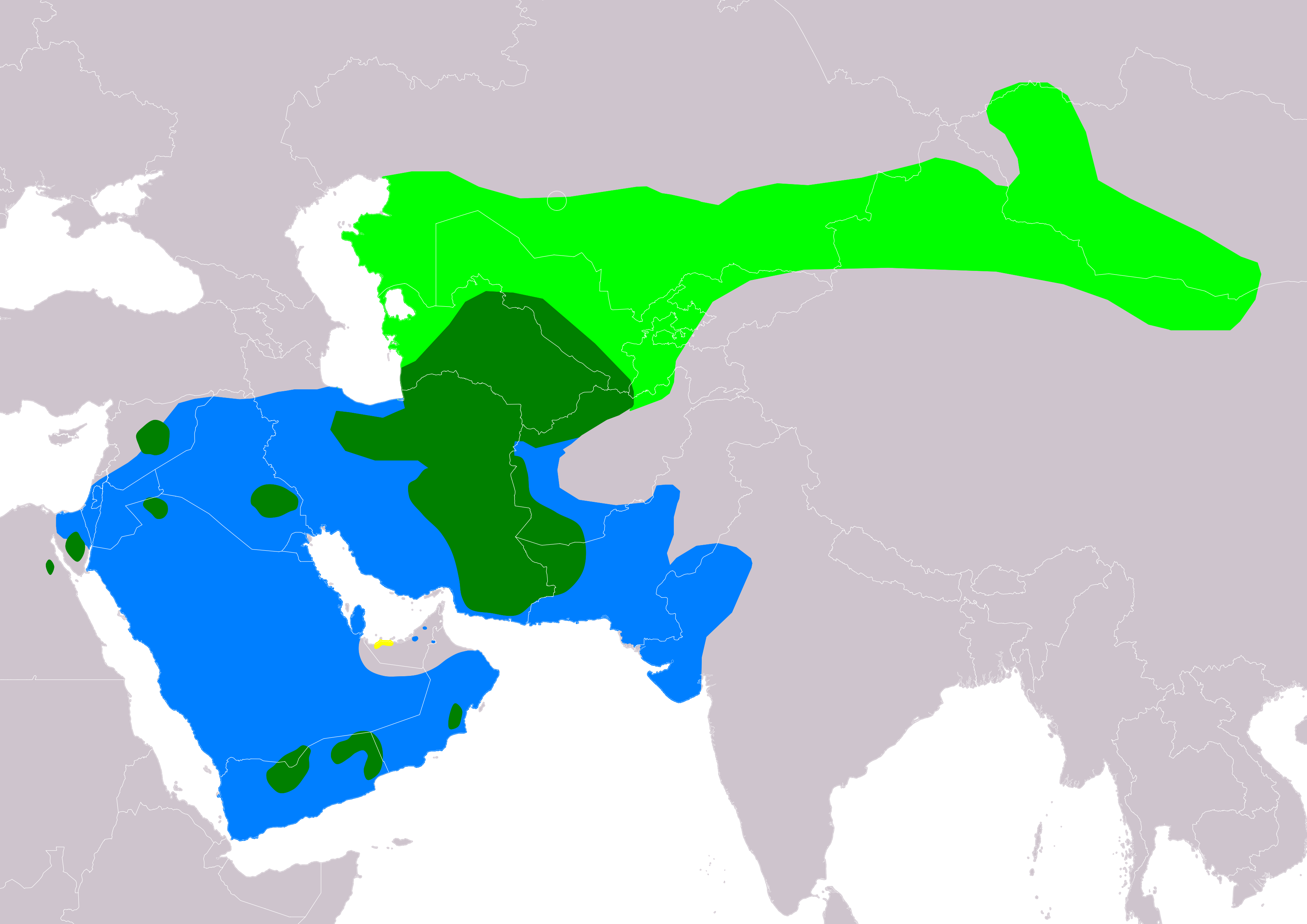
- Range of Ch. macqueenii Breeding Resident Non-breeding Extant and Reintroduced (resident)

= Asian houbara =

Species of bird

The Asian houbara (Chlamydotis macqueenii), also known as MacQueen's bustard, is a large bird in the bustard family. It is native to the desert and steppe regions of Asia, east from the Sinai Peninsula extending across Iran and further north toward Kazakhstan and Mongolia. In the 19th century, vagrants were found as far west of their range as Great Britain. Populations have decreased by 20–50% between 1984 and 2004 mainly due to hunting and changes in land-use. The Asian houbara is a partial latitudinal migrant while the African houbara (C. undulata) is more sedentary. These two species are the only members of the genus Chlamydotis. The Asian houbara used to be regarded as a subspecies of the African houbara.

== Taxonomy ==
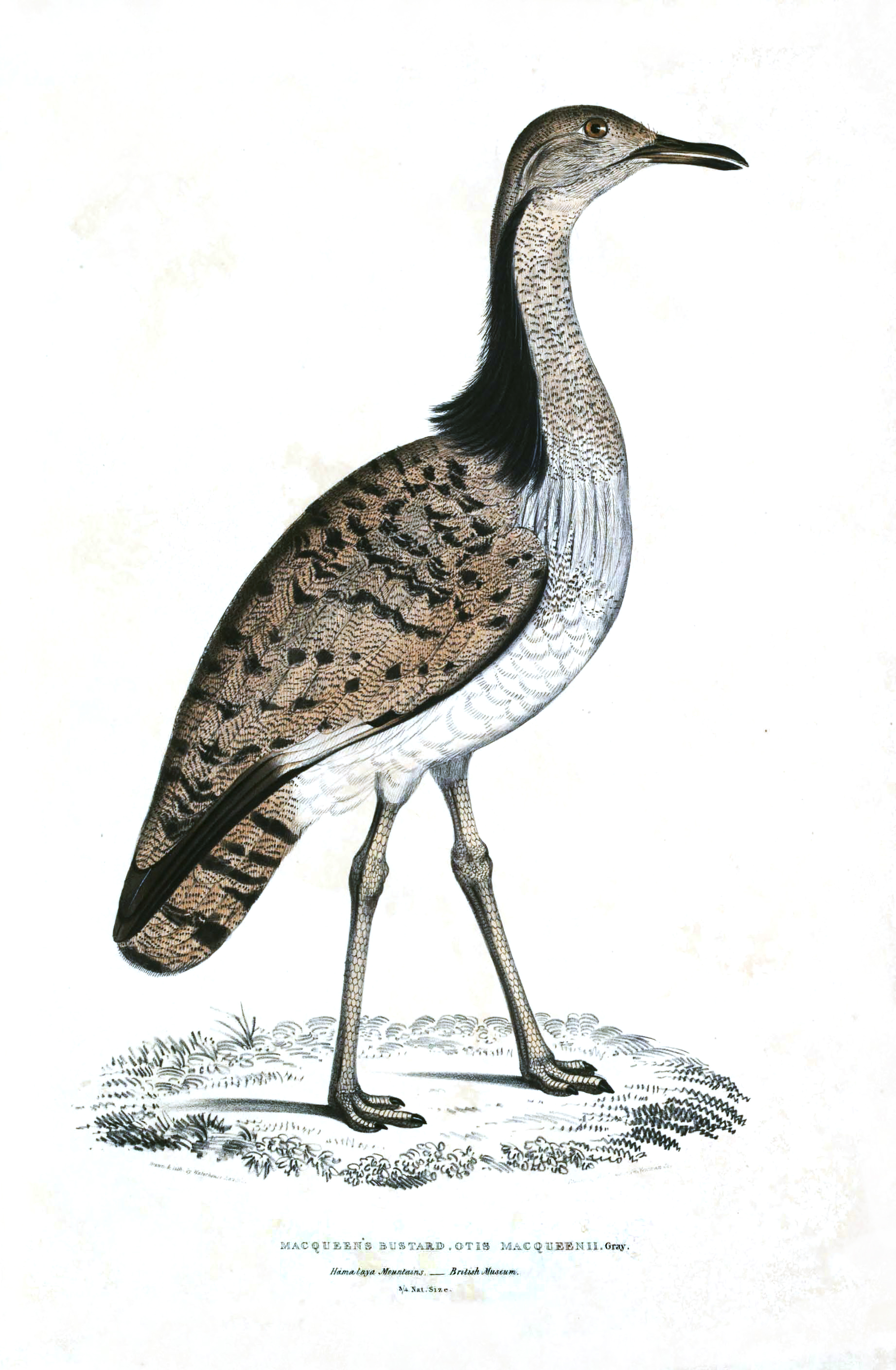
Lithograph from Illustrations of Indian Zoology (1832)

Otis macqueenii was proposed by John Edward Gray in 1834 for a bustard from India drawn by Thomas Hardwicke. It was long regarded a subspecies of the African houbara Chlamydotis undulata. It was classified as a distinct species in 2003.

The genus name Chlamydotis is from Ancient Greek khlamus, a horseman's cloak with weights sewn into the corners, and otis, bustard.

The Asian houbara is larger than the African houbara and much paler. The feathers on the top of the head include some long and curved feathers which are white or black with white bases. In the houbara, these crest feathers are all white and the difference is evident during the display of the male. The lack of intermediate forms in the region where the ranges of the Asian houbara and the African houbara meet, presumed to be in the Nile valley, differences in morphology and display behaviour led to their being elevated to full species. The African houbara now refers only to the North African population, included as the nominate subspecies C. undulata undulata and a small population on the Canary Islands (C. u. fuertaventurae).

Estimates based on the divergence of mitochondrial DNA sequence suggest that the species separated from the common ancestors of C. u. undulata and C. u. fuertaventurae nearly 430,000 years ago. This divergence may have begun 900,000 years ago, at a time of extreme aridity. The wide dispersal abilities of the Asian houbara ensure that its genes are more well mixed unlike the geographically structured genetic patterns shown by the African houbara.

== Description ==
This medium-sized bustard is about 65 cm (26 in) long with a 140 cm (55 in) wingspan. It is brown above and white below, with black stripes down the sides of the neck. In flight, the long wings show large areas of black and brown on the flight feathers and a white patch at the base of the primaries. From below the wing is mostly white with a black trailing edge. Sexes are similar, but the female is smaller and paler above.

Males and females are nearly identical in plumage but males are slightly larger than females. A study of the morphometrics of the Asian houbara from Pakistan based on about 79 individuals of known sex showed that the males were 9–15% larger than females on most measurements. The use of discriminant analysis allowed correct identification of the sexes based on morphometrics in about 99% of the cases.

== Distribution and habitat ==
The Asian houbara occurs from the east of the Sinai Peninsula to the Caspian Sea and extending east to the Gobi Desert in Mongolia. Birds from the northern populations winter further south in Pakistan, mainly in western Balochistan, and in the dry arid zone of western India. Vagrants have historically been found as far west and north as Britain and as far south as northern Kerala. A bustard was shot in 1847 at Lincolnshire, Yorkshire in 1898, and another in Aberdeenshire in 1898 all in the month of October. Possibly the last of these vagrants visited Suffolk in November–December 1962. The Asian houbara breeds in deserts and other very arid sandy areas. Its habitat in Saudi Arabia is very dependent on good vegetation cover and tended to be found in areas with dense growth of scrub vegetation, particularly Capparis spinosa. A study in the steppes of Iran found that nest sites were chosen mainly in locations with high densities of insect prey which in turn were related to vegetation characteristics.

=== Migration ===
The migrations of the Asian houbara have been tracked using satellite transmitters. Mongolian birds leave the wintering areas in Afghanistan and Pakistan from mid to late March and arrive in their breeding grounds after about two months of flying, taking a path that avoids the high mountains of the Himalayas. They fly about 220 km (140 mi) a day and cover a total of 4,400 km (2,700 mi) with stopovers along the path. They spend about four months in their breeding territories before setting off again and reach their winter grounds from October to December.

Satellite tracking of 48 individual houbaras across multiple migrations showed that this species uses the local temperature to time their spring migration departure.

== Behaviour and ecology ==
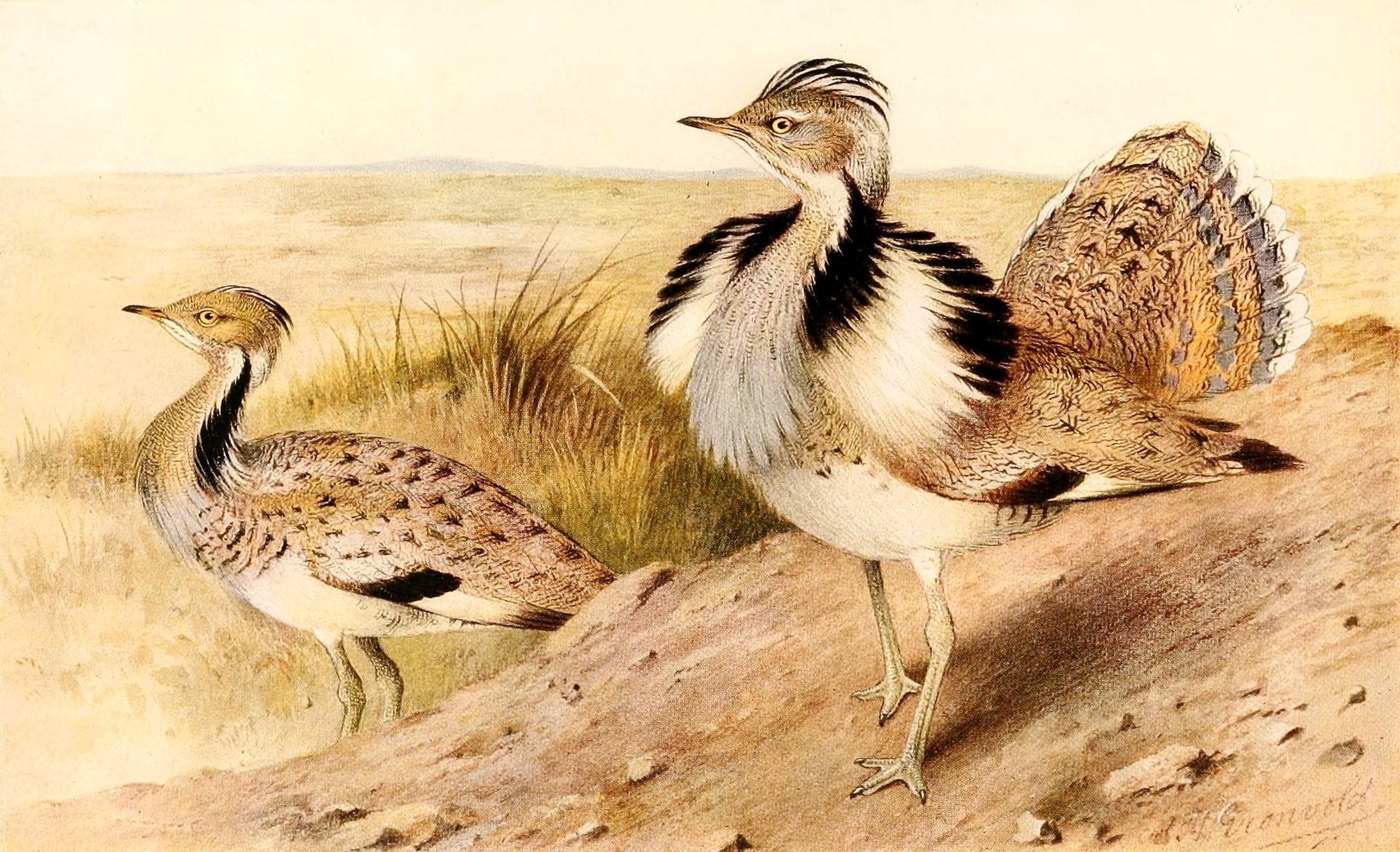
Illustration of a male in partial display with the ruff or collar erected

The male houbara displays initially with the neck upright and the feathers on the base of the neck erected. A few feathers on the head are also erected while walking slowly, with one foot moved carefully and placed just ahead of the other. This is followed by a more vigorous phase of running either in a line or in a circle around a few bushes while the neck is tucked back into an "S". The neck feathers are erected and cover the head. The feet are raised in a measured gait and the neck is swayed from side to side. A low sound of breathing may be heard but only at close range. Males will call during display and if there are no potential mates, the display may be repeated. When a mate appears to be receptive, the male puffs up the black feathers on the sides of the neck so that it appears like a black collar or ruff and walks towards the female while twisting his body from side to side. The males mate with multiple females and after mating, the female alone builds the nest and incubates. The clutch consists of 2–4 eggs laid in a bare scrape on the ground. The eggs hatch after about 23 days and as in all bustards, the nidifugous chicks leave the nest immediately after hatching and follow the mother which picks insects and passes them to the chicks with her beak. The young fledge in about 30 days but remain close to their mother for several months.

When pursued by falcons (such as the saker falcon or peregrine falcon) in falconry, the bustard rises into the air and spirals to avoid being struck. It has been claimed that it also defends itself by defecating on the falcon, the sticky green faeces causing the falcon to crash to the ground with wings stuck.

This species is omnivorous taking seeds, berries, insects and other invertebrates. They do not drink water and obtain all the moisture they need from their diet. Tenebrionid beetles were found to be especially numerous in one study. Plant material makes up more of their diet during the non-breeding season.

== Threats ==
The Asian houbara was once nearly hunted to near-extinction in the Middle East by Arab falconers, hunters and poachers. It was considered great sport in colonial India, especially to hunt tiloor (the local name) from camel back. The bird would be approached in narrowing circles and on close approach the bustard would squat on the ground and conceal itself. The introduction of jeeps and guns however led to a drastic decline in the population of the species. Hunts in some parts of Pakistan have been organized for wealthy Arabs who purchase permits to hunt a limited number of birds but routinely exceed quotas. The meat of this bustard is considered in the Arab world to be an aphrodisiac and a diuretic according to another source.

Rapid population declines of about 50% were seen in their breeding grounds in Kazakhstan between 1998 and 2002 and thought to be due to hunting, especially in their winter grounds. Annual declines over a ten-year period across Asia were estimated at 27–30% in 2004. The main threat to the Asian houbara is degradation of semi-desert habitat by the introduction of agriculture and by infrastructure development such as roads and electricity, which are responsible for increased mortality of birds. In addition, power line collisions are a significant and previously underreported threat along the Central Asian Flyway migration route in Uzbekistan. A 2024 conservation project conducted in the Abbas Abad Wildlife Refuge in central Iran found that installing brightly colored spirals diverters along a high-risk power line eliminated reported collisions with Asian Houbara over a one-year period.

They also are at considerable risk during migration from heavy poaching as well as a lack of suitable habitats along their migration routes due to development. It is very sensitive to disturbance by humans and livestock when nesting. However, sheep grazing does not disturb the Asian Houbara's non-breeding habitats.

== Conservation ==
Conservation efforts were made across the region after the 1970s with international conservation organizations working along with local governments. Some captive breeding facilities were created including one in Saudi Arabia in 1986 and have been successful in captive breeding since the late 1990s, initially by incubating eggs collected from the wild and later entirely in captivity using artificial insemination. Captive-bred birds are considerably more inbred and may be susceptible to diseases.

Being migratory species, it is important that captive-bred bustards undertake similar migrations as wild birds. Comparing the migrations of captive and wild birds using satellite telemetry, it was found that captive-bred individuals started autumn migration later and wintered closer to the breeding grounds than wild individuals. The surviving captive-bred bustards were also faithful in their wintering locations in subsequent years. As migration has a genetic component, it is important to consider migratory population structure, as well as natal and release-site fidelity, during captive breeding management of this species.

The Asian houbara is protected in the United Arab Emirates. In February 2019, 50 individuals were released into the Arabian Desert in Al Ain Region in the Emirate of Abu Dhabi, to help conserve the species and increase its numbers in the wild.
