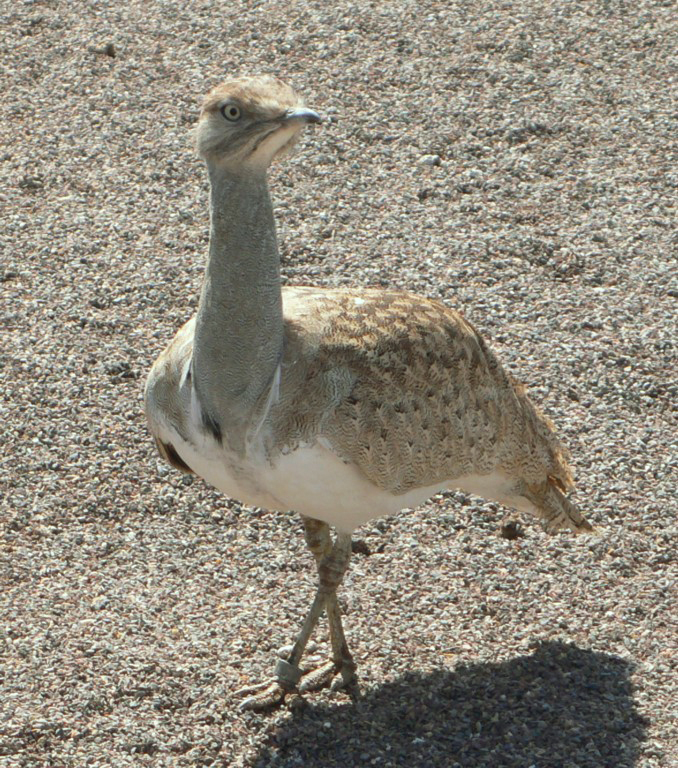

Conservation status
- Vulnerable (IUCN 3.1)
- CITES Appendix I

Scientific classification
- Kingdom: Animalia
- Phylum: Chordata
- Class: Aves
- Order: Otidiformes
- Family: Otididae
- Genus: Chlamydotis
- Species: C. undulata

Binomial name
- Chlamydotis undulata (Jacquin, 1784)
- Range of Ch. undulata Extant (resident) Possibly extant (resident) Possibly extinct

= African houbara =

Species of bird

The African houbara (Chlamydotis undulata), also known as the houbara bustard (houbara from Arabic: حُبَارَى, romanized: ḥubārā for bustards in general), is a relatively small bustard native to North Africa, where it lives in arid habitats. The global population is listed as Vulnerable on the IUCN Red List since 2014. There is a population in the Canary Islands which was assessed as Near Threatened in 2015, but has since also been assessed as Vulnerable.

It is dull brown with black markings on the wings, a greyish neck and a black ruff along the side of the neck. Males are larger and heavier than females.

== Description ==
The African houbara is a small to mid-sized bustard. It measures 55–75 cm (22–30 in) in length and spans 135–170 cm (53–67 in) across the wings. It is brown above and white below, with a black stripe down the sides of its neck. In flight, the long wings show large areas of black and brown on the flight feathers. The sexes are similar, but the female, between 55–65 cm (22–26 in) tall, is rather smaller and greyer above than the male, at 65–75 cm (26–30 in) tall. The body mass is 1.8–3.2 kg (4.0–7.1 lb) in males and 1.2–1.7 kg (2.6–3.7 lb) in females.

== Taxonomy ==
Psophia undulata was the scientific name proposed by Joseph Franz von Jacquin in 1784 who described a houbara brought from Tripoli to Vienna's Tiergarten Schönbrunn. Otis macqueenii was proposed by John Edward Gray in 1832 for a bustard from India drawn by Thomas Hardwicke. The African houbara was subordinated to the genus Chlamydotis by René Lesson in 1839. Houbara fuertaventurae was proposed by Walter Rothschild and Ernst Hartert in 1894 for a houbara from Fuerteventura island.

MacQueen's bustard was long regarded a subspecies of the African houbara. It was proposed as a distinct species in 2003 because of differences in plumage, vocalizations and courtship behaviour. The British Ornithologists' Union's Taxonomic Records Committee's decision to accept this split has been questioned on the grounds that the differences in the male courtship displays may be functionally trivial, and would not prevent interbreeding, whereas a difference in a pre-copulation display would indicate that the two are separate species. The committee responded to this scepticism, by explaining that there are differences in both courtship and pre-copulation displays.

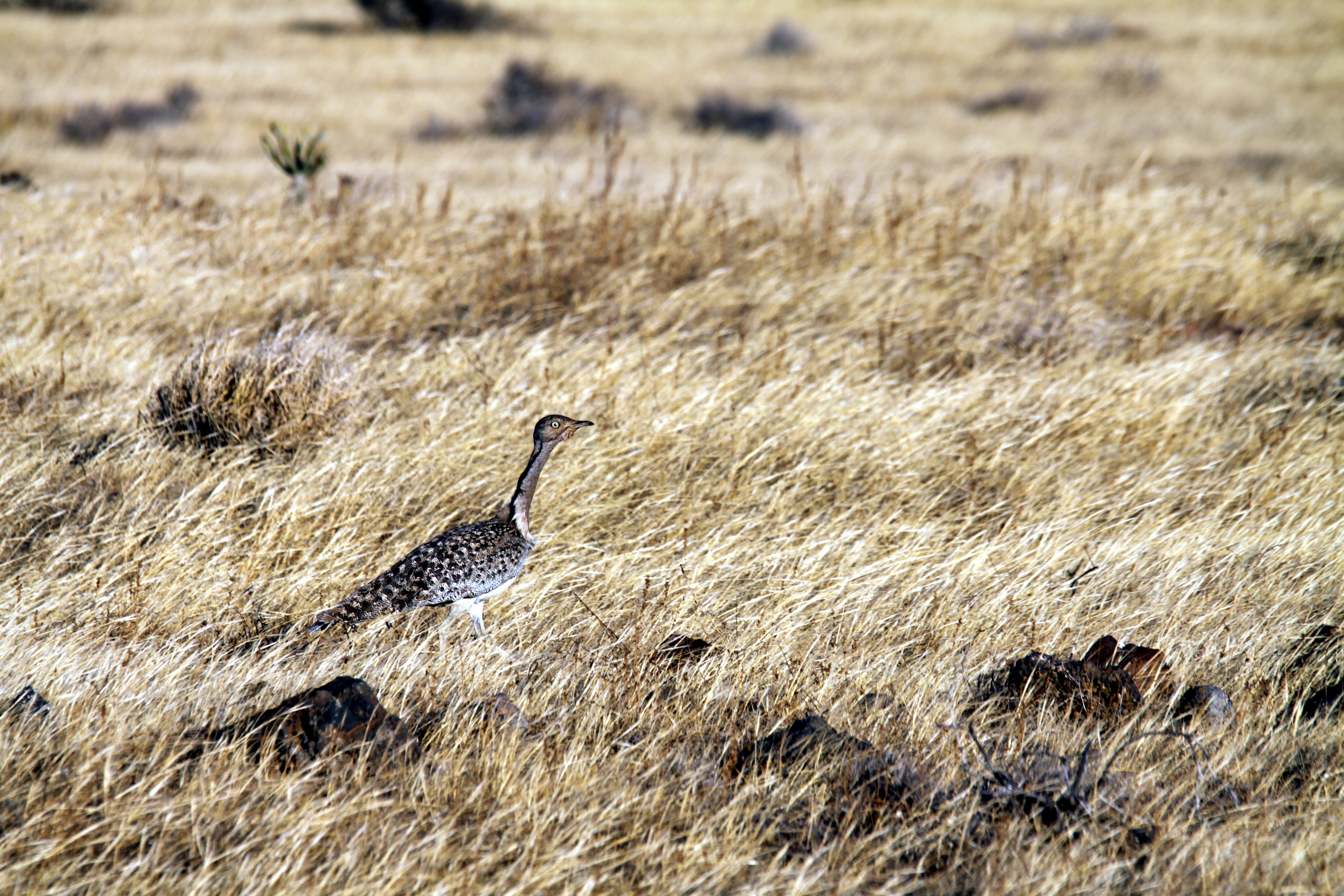
Canarian houbara in Lanzarote, Canary Islands

Results of analysis of mitochondrial DNA sequences of 73 Chlamydotis samples indicates that the houbara bustard and MacQueen's bustard genetically diverged around 430,000 years ago from a common ancestor. The divergence between the African and Canarian houbara was estimated at 20,000 to 25,000 years ago.

== Distribution and habitat ==
The African houbara is found in North Africa west of the Nile, mainly in the western part of the Sahara desert region in Algeria, Egypt, Libya, Mauritania, Morocco, Tunisia and Western Sahara. Some old records exist from Sudan as well. A small population is found in the Canary Islands. The Asian houbara or MacQueen's bustard which was earlier included in this species occurs east of the Sinai Peninsula. The North African species is sedentary unlike the migratory northern populations of MacQueen's bustards.

The subspecies fuertaventurae of the Canary Islands is highly restricted and endangered. A 1997 survey found a total population of about 500 birds.

== Behaviour and ecology ==
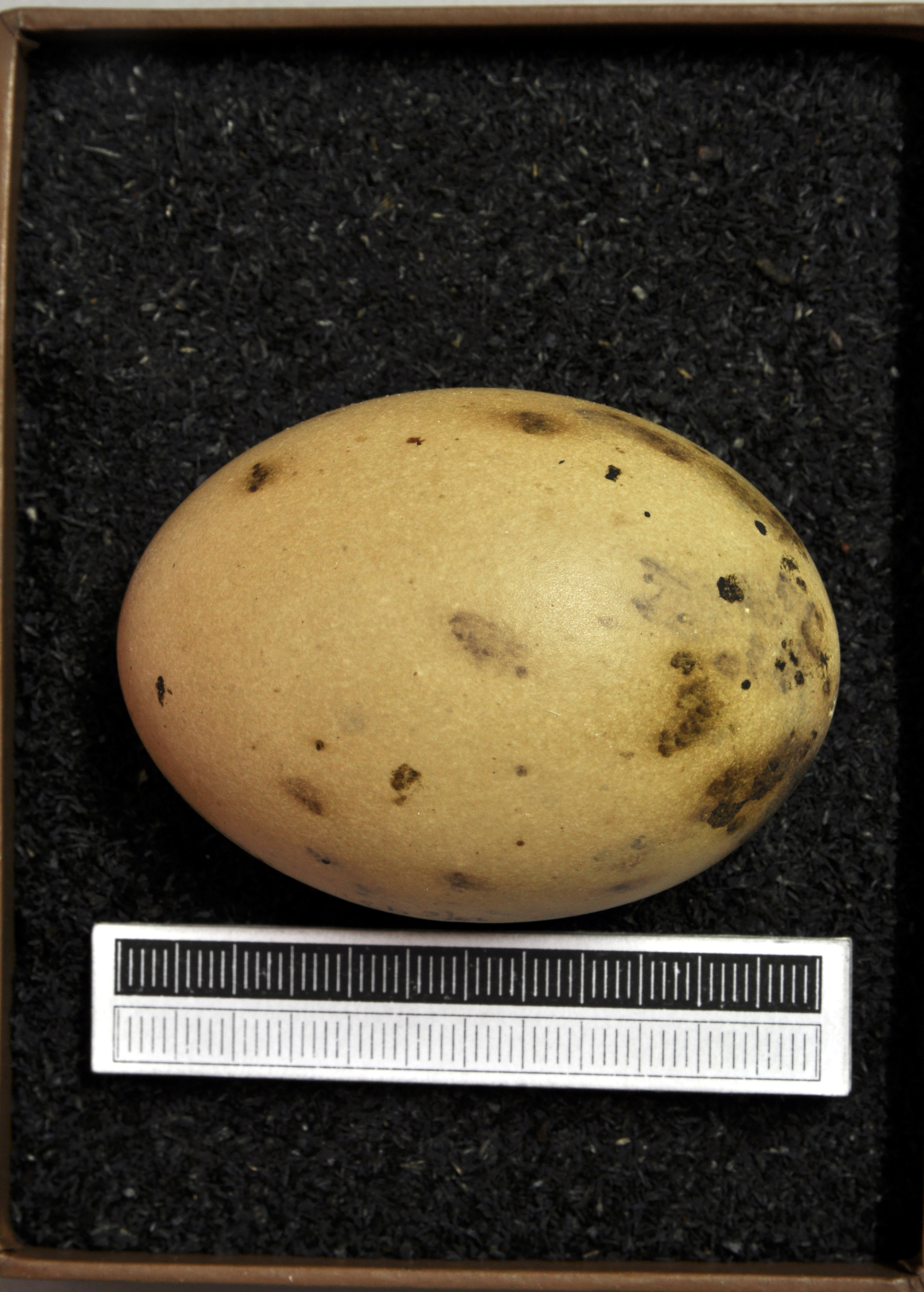
Houbara bustard egg in the collection of the Museum Wiesbaden

The African houbara has a flamboyant display raising the white feathers of the head and neck and withdrawing the head. Females lay two to four eggs on the ground. It rarely vocalizes, but males make 3–5 low booming notes during breeding displays.

It is omnivorous, eating seeds, insects and other small creatures.

== Threats ==
In North Africa, the houbara bustard is hunted by falconers and by hunters with guns. The populations declined in the two decades before 2004, but have been increasing since.

== Conservation ==
The International Fund for Houbara Conservation developed and implemented a global conservation strategy over the past forty years with the objective of ensuring a sustainable future in the wild through conservation programmes and management plans. This strategy consists of an integrated approach combining ecology, protection measures in the wild, conservation breeding, and reinforcement programmes.
