= National Center for Wildlife (Saudi Arabia) =

National Center of Wildlife (NCW)
- المركز الوطني لتنمية الحياة الفطرية

Agency overview
- Formed: 26 March 2019; 7 years ago
- Preceding agency: General Authority of Meteorology and Environmental Protection
- Jurisdiction: Saudi Arabia
- Headquarters: Riyadh
- Parent agency: Ministry of Environment, Water, and Agriculture
- Website: http://www.ncw.gov.sa

The National Center of Wildlife (NCW), formerly Saudi Wildlife Authority, is a government agency is Saudi Arabia was established in 1986 and responsible for the protection, preservation and development of wildlife in country.

== History ==
The National Center of Wildflife was established in March 2019 during Council of Minister session No. 417, which saw the cancellation of General Authority of Meteorology and Environmental Protection. In addition to the wildlife center establishment, the session included the establishment of the National Center for Meteorology, National Center for Environmental Compliance, National Center for Plant Covering Development and Combating of Desertification.
