= Al Maha =

Al Maha is the Arabic word for the Arabian oryx.

Al Maha may also refer to:

- Al Maha Airways, a defunct airline based in Saudi Arabia
- Al Maha Petroleum, an oil company based in Oman
