= Arabian oryx reintroduction =

Reintroduction of oryx to the wild

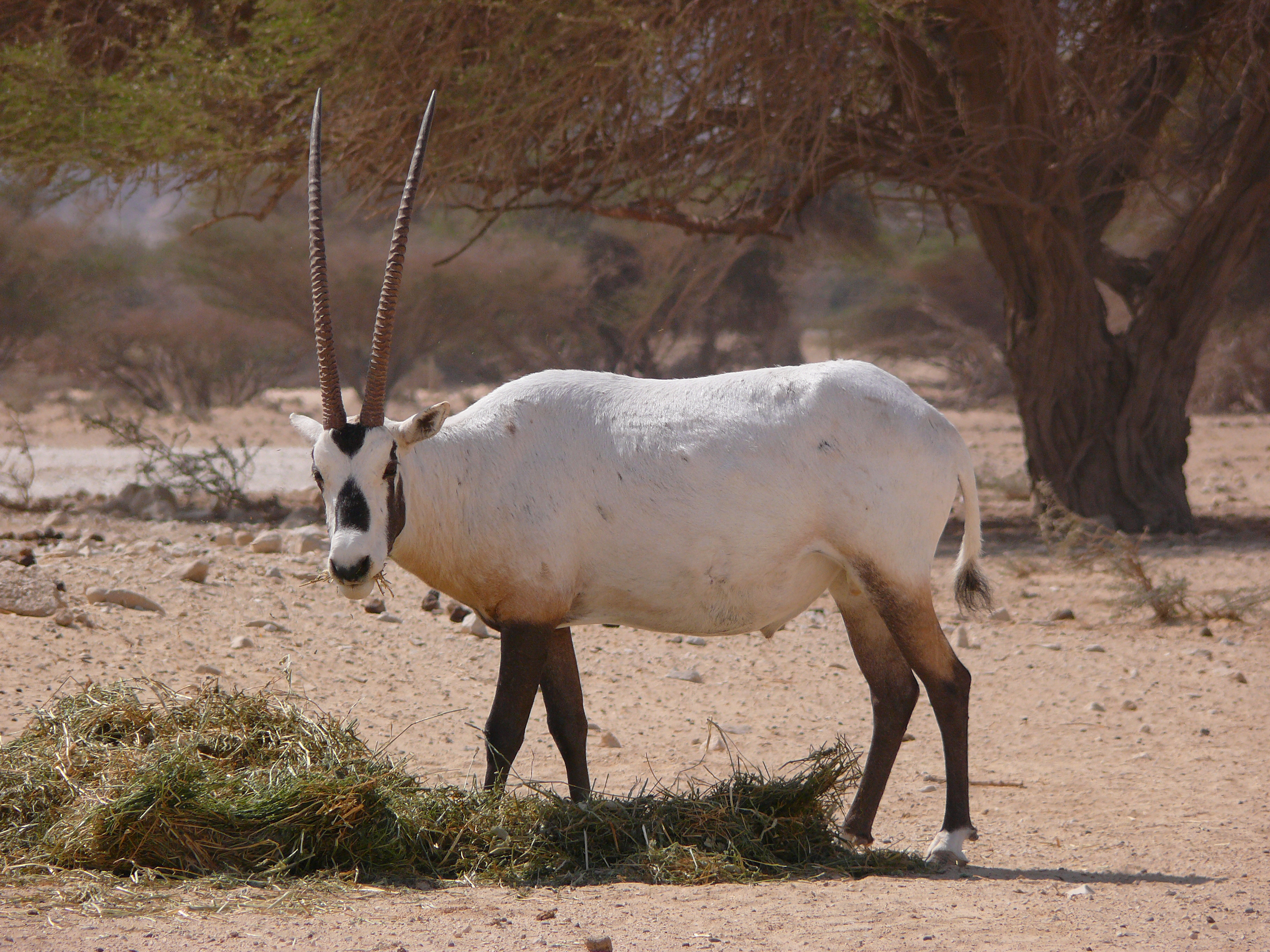
Arabian oryx at Chay Bar Yotvata, Israel

The Arabian oryx (Oryx leucoryx), also called the white oryx, was extinct in the wild as of 1972, but was reintroduced to the wild starting in 1982. The initial reintroduction was primarily from two herds: the "World Herd" originally started at the Phoenix Zoo in 1963 from only nine oryx and the Saudi Arabian herd started in 1986 from private collections and some "World Herd" stock by the Saudi National Wildlife Research Center (NWRC). As of 2009, there have been reintroductions in Oman, Saudi Arabia, Israel, the United Arab Emirates, and Jordan, and as of 2013 the IUCN Red List classifies the species as vulnerable.

== Decline of a species ==
The Arabian oryx was known to be in decline since the early 1900s in the Arabian Peninsula. By the 1930, there were two separate populations isolated from each other. In 1960, Lee M. Talbot reported that Arabian oryx appeared to be extinct in its former range along the southern edge of Ar-Rub' al-Khali. He believed that any oryx still existing would be exterminated within the next few years and recommended that a captive breeding program be started to save the species. Michael Crouch, then Assistant Adviser in the Eastern Aden Protectorate, drew attention to the fact that each spring, small groups of oryx still emerged onto the gravel plains in the northeast corner of the Protectorate, where he thought a capture attempt would be possible.

== Operation Oryx ==
Operation Oryx was a program of the Phoenix Zoo and the Fauna and Flora Preservation Society of London (now Fauna and Flora International), with financial help from the World Wide Fund for Nature. One of the first captive breeding programs at any zoo, this program had the specific goal of saving and then reintroducing Arabian oryx in the wild.

The initial plan of the Fauna and Flora Preservation Society was to establish a herd in Kenya where another species of oryx already lived and flourished. The Kenyan plan was dropped because of an outbreak of hoof-and-mouth disease, and the oryx destined for Kenya were shipped to the Phoenix Zoo instead.

There were originally four individuals captured and seven donated for this project. The four were captured in Aden (now Yemen) near the border of Oman by an expedition led by the late Major Ian Grimwood, then chief game warden of Kenya, with help from Manahil and Mahra tribesmen. One male from this group later died of capture stress. The seven donated oryx were: one from the London Zoo, two from Sheikh Jaber Abdullah al-Sabah, and two pairs from the collection of King Saud bin Abdul Aziz. One of the oryx from Sheikh Jaber Abdullah al-Sabah died before delivery as well, leaving nine oryx to start the "World Herd."

Five Arabian oryx were delivered to the Phoenix Zoo in 1963 (four in June and one in September). A baby was born to the herd in October 1963 from a conception en route and another was born in spring 1964, bringing the starting population of the Phoenix Zoo herd to seven. The four oryx donated by King Saud arrived at the Phoenix Zoo in July 1964, bringing the population of the "World Herd" to 11.

The breeding program at the Phoenix Zoo was very successful, and the zoo celebrated its 225th Arabian oryx birth in 2002. From Phoenix, individuals were sent to other zoos and parks (including the San Diego Wild Animal Park) to start their herds. Most of the Arabian oryx in the wild today have ancestors from the Phoenix Zoo.

== Reintroductions ==
Reintroductions started in 1982 in Oman. As of 2009 there have been reintroductions in Oman, Saudi Arabia, Israel, the United Arab Emirates, and Jordan. As of 2017, populations in the United Arab Emirates and Jordan are still not considered in the International Union for Conservation of Nature (IUCN) Red List wild oryx count. The population in Oman is still receiving supplementary forage, and the introduction into Jordan was after the last update of the Red List.

=== Oman ===
By 1980, the number of Arabian oryx in captivity had increased to the point that reintroduction to Oman was attempted from the San Diego Wild Animal Park to Jaaluni in the Jiddat al-Harasis. The oryx were initially kept in large pens outdoors, but were released to the wild on January 31, 1982, in the Omani Central Desert and Coastal Hills.

These oryx became the core of the Oman herd in the wild, though there were several other releases of captive bred animals over the next two decades. The area of their release became the Arabian Oryx Sanctuary.

On June 28, 2007, Oman's Arabian Oryx Sanctuary was the first site to be removed from the UNESCO World Heritage List. UNESCO cited the Omani government's decision to open 90% of the site to oil prospecting as the main reason for this decision. The Arabian oryx population on the site has been reduced from 450 oryx in 1996 to only 65 in 2007, mostly due to poaching and illegal live capture. There are now fewer than four breeding pairs left on the site.

The Al-Wusta Wildlife Reserve in Oman has had an important role in the rescue of the Oryx, drawing its breeding population from the "World Herd" established at the Phoenix Zoo and the United Arab Emirates population. Testing has shown that the individuals in this reserve hold 58% of the genetic diversity found globally, meaning they have low imbreeding and are good candidates for reintroduction efforts in the region.

=== Saudi Arabia ===
Organized captive breeding of the Arabian oryx in Saudi Arabia began in April 1986, when 57 oryx from the farm of the late King Khalid bin Abdul Aziz in King Khalid Wildlife Research Center were brought to the National Wildlife Research Center (NWRC) near At-Ta'if.

Between the initial 1986 founding and 1996, 33 additional oryx (including some from the "World Herd") have been introduced to the founder generation of Arabian oryx at the NWRC. Since 1996, all additions to the population have been through births.

Due to an outbreak of Mycobacterium bovis (bovine tuberculosis) in the founder generation, a "buffer generation" was introduced in the herd. Since then, calves produced by the founder herd are removed from their dam immediately after birth and hand-reared. These hand-reared second generation oryx are regularly tested for tuberculosis and a variety of other pathogenic agents, and join the breeding nucleus only when tests are consecutively negative. After breeding, they produce the third generation of oryx, which are tuberculosis free and mother-reared, and of which more than 80% are reintroduced into the wild.

Reintroduction of a wild population began in 1995 in the 'Uruq Bani Ma'arid Protected Area. The reserve covers about 12,000 km^{2} (4,600 sq mi) at the western edge of the Rubʿ al-Khali desert or "Empty Quarter". As of 2009, the IUCN Red List estimates the oryx population on this reserve at 160 individuals.

A free ranging herd was established in the newly created Mahazat as-Sayd Protected Area in 1989. This 2,244 km^{2} (866 sq mi) fenced reserve is home to reintroduced oryx, gazelle and the houbara bustard. As of 2009, the IUCN Red List estimates the oryx population on this reserve at about 800 individuals. There is currently some debate about whether animals in this reserve should be considered "wild."

=== Israel ===
In Israel the reintroduction program was established in 1978 when four pairs of Arabian oryx were purchased. At this time the IUCN Redbook reported wild populations totaling 90–100 animals in three locations in Northern Arava and the Negev Desert. As of 2014 there are around 130 animals in the Aravah, and in 2013 they began to spread to the central Negev and the population keeps increasing. In addition to the natural population increase, every year around six animals are released to the wild in Israel. Israel is the only country in which the Arabian oryx was reintroduced where poaching prohibition can be enforced, and because of this the Israeli population grows annually. Apart from the wild oryx population in Israel, there are a few dozen oryx in the Yotvata Hai-Bar Nature Reserve, a few breeding couples in the Jerusalem Biblical Zoo and a small herd in the Ramat Gan Safari. The reintroduction of oryx in Israel is one of a few successful programs reintroducing animals into nature in Israel; others include the introduction of the Persian onager (a proxy for the extinct Syrian onager), and the very successful reintroduction of Persian fallow deer.

=== United Arab Emirates ===
In the early 1960s, the late Sheikh Zayed bin Sultan Al Nahyan directed the capture of two breeding pairs of the oryx for the nucleus of a captive-breeding program in Al Ain, which would lead to the formation of the city's zoo. In 2007 the United Arab Emirates started releasing animals into Umm Al Zumul. As of 2009 there have been about 100 animals released. As part of this initiative, a similar program is being developed to reintroduce this extinct species into its natural habitats in Yemen and Iraq.

Since March 1999, the Emirate of Abu Dhabi has been host to an inter-governmental body known as The Coordinating Committee for the Conservation of the Arabian Oryx, which oversees the coordination of conservation efforts for this species within the Arabian Peninsula. In 2012, GSCAO carried out an Arabian Oryx Disease Survey which was funded by the Environment Agency – Abu Dhabi (EAD), in the range states.

The Arabian oryx are periodically released in protected areas, such as the Qasr Al Sarab Protected Area. As of 2017, it is estimated that around 10,000 Arabian oryx, of which 5,000 are estimated to be in Abu Dhabi, are currently in the United Arab Emirates.

=== Jordan ===
The reintroduction project for Jordan began when the Environment Agency of Abu Dhabi (EAD) and the Al Aqaba Special Economic Zone Authority signed a sponsorship agreement in April 2007. Under this agreement, EAD is sponsoring the million three-year project which includes reintroduction of the Arabian oryx into the Wadi Rum Protected Area, rehabilitating the habitat, and helping local residents to improve their living standards.

Twenty oryx (12 males and 8 females) were released into the Wadi Rum Protected Area in July 2009.

== Impact ==
In 1986, as a result of the reintroduction efforts, the IUCN re-listed the Arabian oryx from extinct in the wild to endangered. By 2009, the Arabian oryx was protected by law throughout its current range.

In June 2011, the Arabian oryx was re-listed as vulnerable by the IUCN Red List. In 2017 the IUCN estimated the wild population to be 1220 individuals (of which 850 were mature adults), with another 6000–7000 held in captivity worldwide in zoos, preserves, and private collections. Some of these are in large fenced enclosures (free-roaming), including those in Syria (Al Talila), Bahrain, Qatar, and UAE. This was a significant achievement as it was the first time the IUCN had re-classified a species as vulnerable after it had been listed as extinct in the wild. The Arabian oryx is also listed on the CITES convention, which has provided further protection against poaching and international trade.
