= Ruby (elephant) =

Asian elephant (1973–1998)

Ruby painting

Ruby (July 13, 1973 – November 6, 1998) was a 4.5 ton Asian elephant who lived at the Phoenix Zoo and was famous for creating paintings. The most expensive of her paintings sold for $25,000.

== Early life ==
Ruby was born in Thailand and shipped to the Phoenix Zoo in February 1974 when she was about seven months old. Initially, she lived with a goat and some chickens for a few years without any elephant companionship. She would scatter grain in her small 20-by-30 foot enclosure to lure ducks into range, then she stomped them to death. This aberrant behavior was presumably due to the trauma of her separation from her family and her loneliness. In time, Ruby was moved into the main enclosure with the zoo's two African bush elephants.

== Painting ==
Ruby's painting career began when her keepers saw her scratching in the dirt of her enclosure with a stick, and offered her a brush and paints. She painted twice a week. She was a fast painter, typically completing a painting in 10 minutes. For three years, zookeepers did not publicize the knowledge that Ruby could paint. Eventually they revealed this and were able to sell her paintings to raise $50,000 for conservation efforts.

Ruby's paintings were abstract in composition with multiple colors. Two plates that she painted were appraised on the PBS television show Antiques Roadshow for $1500 in 2015.

== Pregnancy and death ==
Zoo officials decided to breed Ruby. Zoo executive director Jeff Williamson was a primary factor in the decision to breed Ruby. In 1996, when she was 22, she was shipped to the Tulsa Zoo to mate with a bull elephant named Allan in Tulsa, Oklahoma where she lived for about a year. When she became pregnant in 1997, she was returned to Phoenix. At the end of October 1998, Ruby began to show signs of labor, but the birth did not start. On October 31, 1998, the zoo's veterinarians determined that her calf had died in her womb, and the decision was made to perform a Caesarean operation. When surgery began on November 6, it was discovered that her uterus had ripped and a massive infection had spread through her abdominal cavity. Her male fetal calf weighed 321 pounds. Normal newborn elephants usually weigh between 200 and 250 pounds. Ruby was euthanized immediately and her death triggered an outpouring of grief throughout the Phoenix area. When the Phoenix Zoo announced a free-admission day in honor of Ruby's memory, 43,000 people attended, nearly triple a normal day's attendance.

=== Ruby's House ===
In the late 1990s, the Caretaker's House, a small stone cottage on the zoo grounds (left over from when the zoo site was a fish hatchery operated from the 1930s to the 1950s) was extensively renovated and dedicated to Ruby's memory and honor. Ruby's House has become a popular venue at the Phoenix Zoo for weddings and receptions.

== See also ==
- List of individual elephants
- Elephant cognition § Art
