= Phoenix Zoo =

Non-profit zoo in Phoenix, Arizona, US

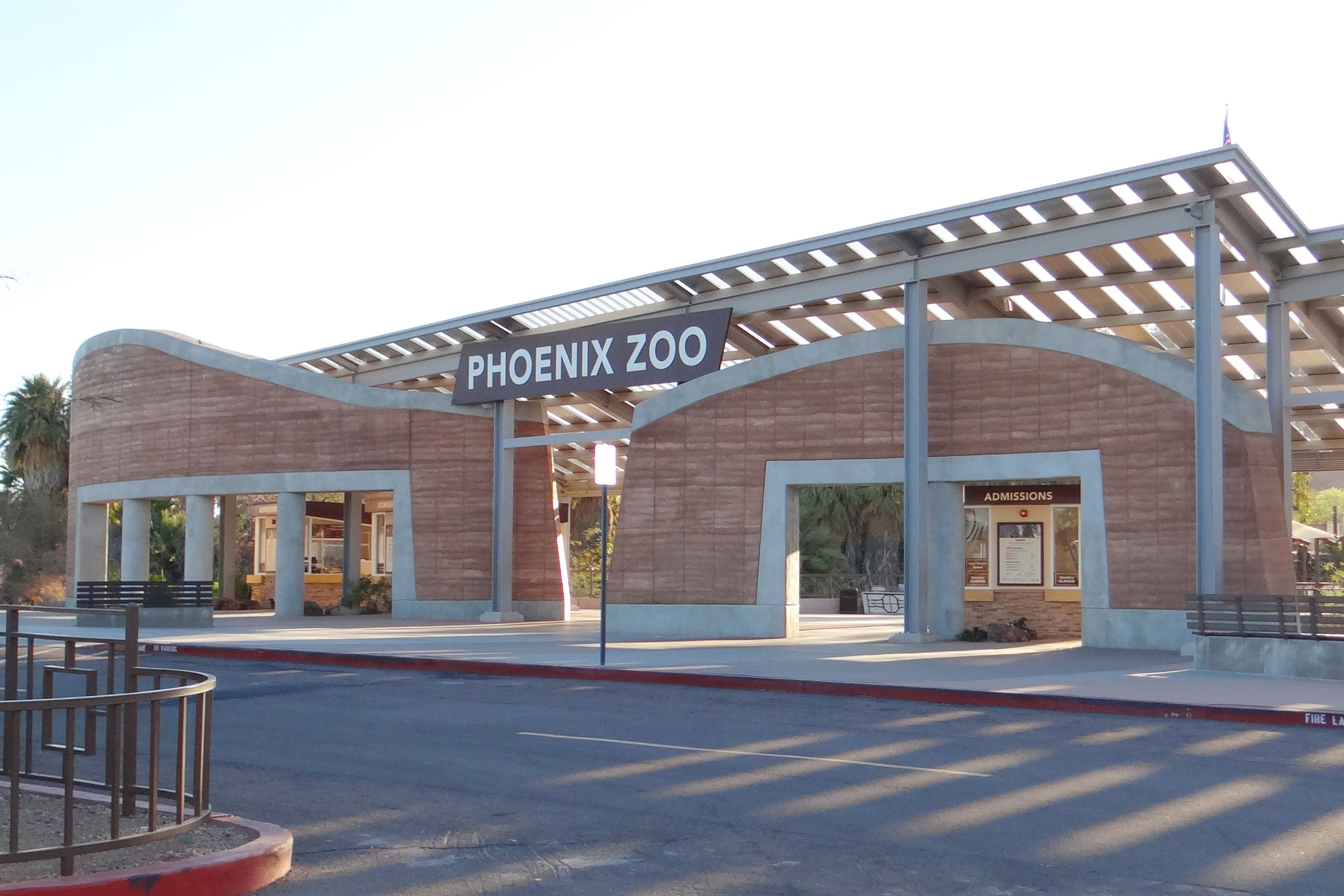
- Phoenix Zoo Main Entrance
- Interactive map of Phoenix Zoo
- 33.4525°N 111.9493°W
- Date opened: 21 November 1962
- Location: Papago Park, Phoenix, Arizona, United States
- Land area: 125 acres (51 ha)
- No. of animals: 3,000
- Annual visitors: 1+ million
- Memberships: AZA WAZA
- Major exhibits: Monkey Village, Harmony Farm, Desert Lives, Stingray Bay, Forest of Uco, Orang-Hutan: "People of the Forest", Isle of the Tiger
- Website: www.phoenixzoo.org

The Phoenix Zoo opened in 1962 and is the largest privately owned nonprofit zoo in the United States. Located in Phoenix, Arizona, the zoo was founded by Robert Maytag, a member of the Maytag family, and operates on 125 acres (51 ha) of land in the Papago Park area of Phoenix. It has been designated as a Phoenix Point of Pride.

The zoo has over 1,400 animals on display and contains 2.5 miles (4.0 km) of walking trails. It is divided into four main themed areas or trails: The Arizona Trail (American Southwest flora and fauna), the Africa Trail (animals from Africa), the Tropics Trail (residents of the rain forests), and the Children's Trail, which includes a petting zoo.

The zoo has been conservation minded from its inception. Soon after it opened, it hosted what was thought to be the last few Arabian oryx, which formed the basis of the world herd created for Operation Oryx and eventually allowed the reintroduction of the species into the wild. It now includes a sanctuary to care for animals that are endangered or unwanted.

== History ==
The Phoenix Zoo began as a personal project of Robert Maytag, who formed the Arizona Zoological Society (now the Arizona Center for Nature Conservation) with the intention of opening a zoo in Phoenix. Although Maytag died unexpectedly a few months before its opening, the zoo opened on schedule on November 21, 1962. It was originally named the "Maytag Zoo", but was renamed the following year to "Phoenix Zoo" to identify it more closely with the community. The zoo was established on the site of a fish hatchery operation built as a Works Progress Administration project in the 1930s, and operated by the Arizona Game and Fish Department until 1959. The zoo has always been a privately owned, non-profit venture.

Although the zoo had some financial struggles in the early 1960s, it grew substantially during the 1970s as it added numerous new exhibits, landscaping features, and visitor amenities. The 1980s saw continued growth, with the addition of African Savanna habitat areas, a children's zoo, a new entrance complex, and other exhibits. During this time, the zoo also underwent a renovation project to divide it into four themed zones (called "trails"), featuring different types of exhibits.

The zoo expanded again in 1998 with the opening of Harmony Farms, home to a petting zoo and many domestic farm animals. In 2000, the zoo opened Desert Lives, and in 2004 it added a new primate walk-through exhibit called Monkey Village. In November 2006, aquatic species were added to the zoo with the opening of Stingray Bay. In November 2009, two Komodo dragons were brought to the zoo as a part of the zoo's capital campaign. In April 2011, as a part of the zoo's capital campaign, Orang-Hutan: People of the Forest, the new orangutan exhibit opened to the public.

== Areas and attractions ==
The Phoenix Zoo has four major themed areas, or "trails", where visitors can experience exhibits representing different areas of the world and their native wildlife: the Arizona Trail, the Africa Trail, the Tropics Trail, and the Discovery/Children's Trail.

=== Arizona Trail ===
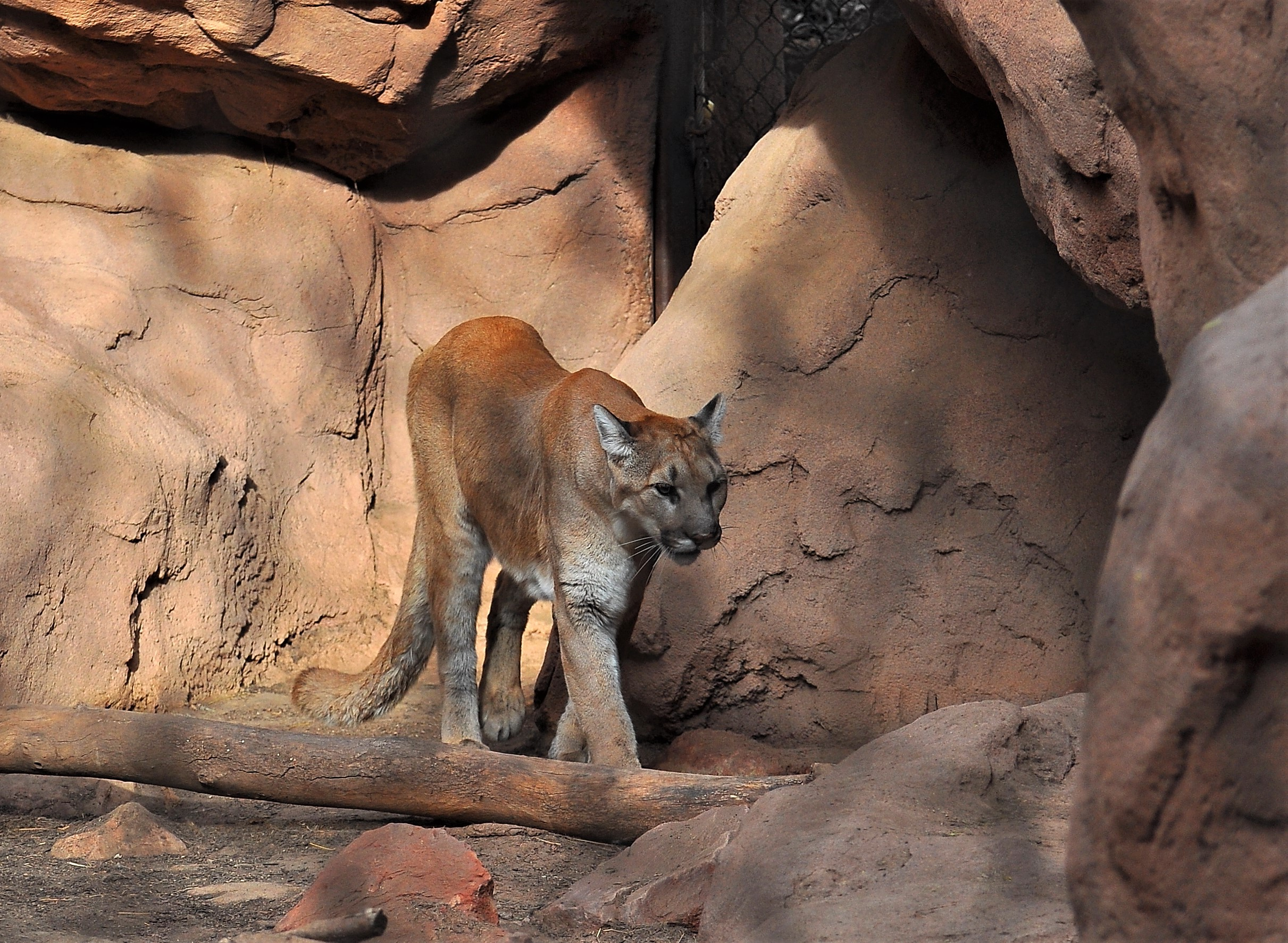
Cougar

The Arizona Trail is designed to emulate the wildlife and plant life of the state of Arizona. It features several plants native to the Sonoran Desert including the saguaro cactus, and animals such as the turtle, coyote, collared peccary (more commonly known as the javelina), cougar, golden eagle, bobcat, snowy egret, raven, horned lizard, rattlesnake, black-tailed prairie dog, ringtail, turkey vulture, California condor, thick billed parrot, Sonoran pronghorn, and the Mexican wolf.

Big Cats of Arizona, a habitat for jaguars and cougars, opened in April 2025. The exhibit provides more than twice the previous space for the zoo's jaguars and approximately five times the previous space for its mountain lions. It features the zoo's first overhead "catwalk," allowing visitors to walk beneath the animals as well as multiple viewing angles and windows. The habitat also includes educational information about the species' historical ranges and features designed to encourage natural behaviors.

=== Africa Trail ===
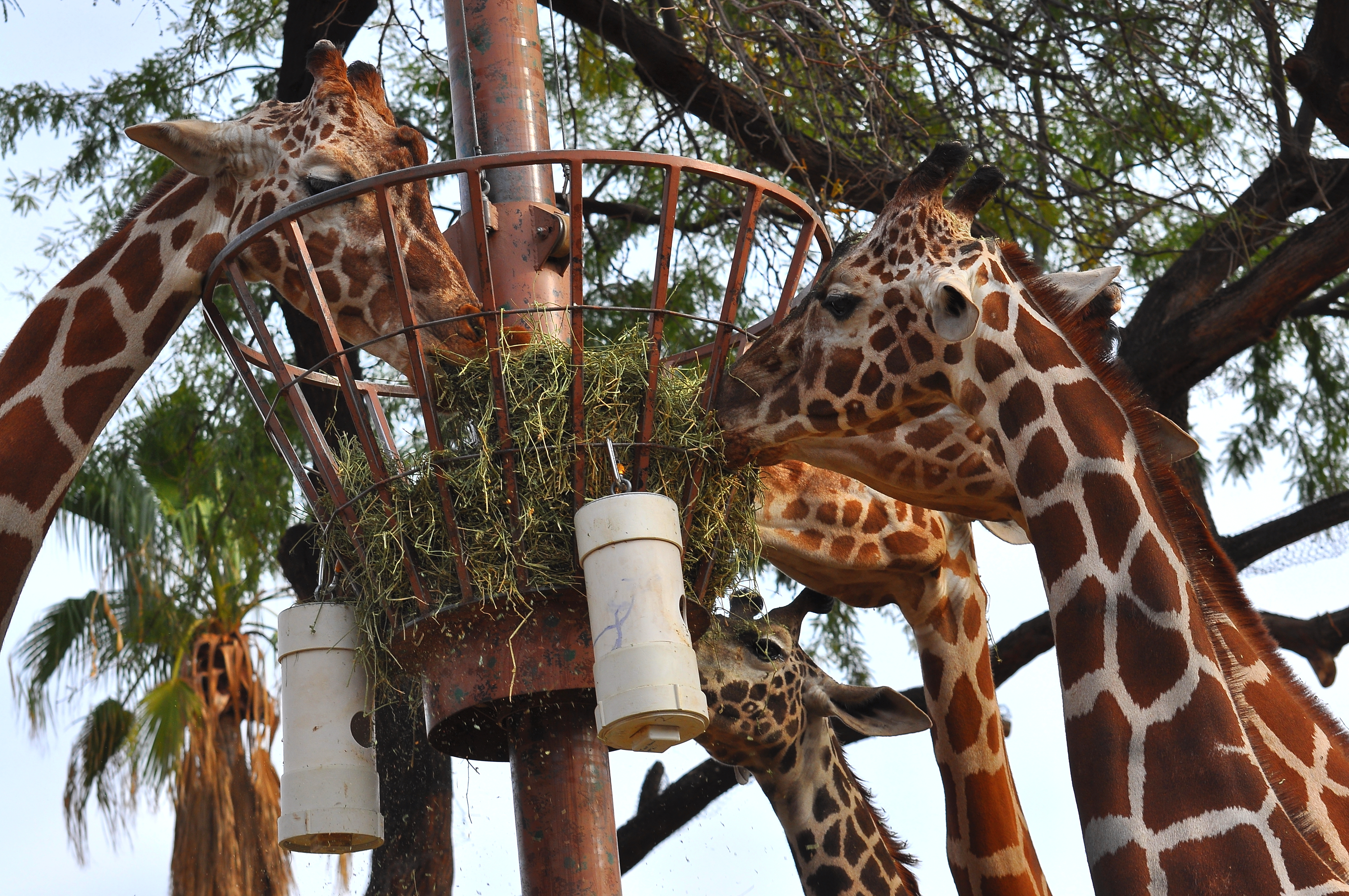
Giraffe feeding station

The Africa Trail showcases many of the most popular animals in the world, including the African painted dogs, hamadryas baboons, mandrills, grey crowned cranes, Thomson’s gazelles, white rhinos, Grévy's zebras, greater flamingos, spotted-necked otters, nyalas, Cape porcupines, Aldabra giant tortoises, Abyssinian ground hornbills, turacos, warthogs, red river hogs, lions, lappet-faced and Rüppell’s vultures, Amur leopards, spotted hyenas, meerkats, fennec foxes, cheetahs, reticulated and Masai giraffes. The Desert Lives (pronounced like "life") trail, diverts off of the Africa Trail before and after the lion and hyena exhibits, and features bighorn sheep and Arabian oryx among the natural buttes.

=== Tropics Trail ===
The Tropics Trail has two parts. The inner trail following the lake is home to the "Tropical Flights" aviary as well as Bornean orangutans and the common squirrel monkeys of "Monkey Village". The outer tropics trail passes by the Komodo dragons and Chinese alligators in the "Land of the Dragons" exhibit, Indian rhinoceroses, jaguars, sun conures, American alligators, scarlet ibises, Galápagos tortoises, Chacoan peccary, Chilean flamingos, greater rheas, black howler monkeys, maned wolf, iguanas, buff-cheeked gibbons, ruffed lemurs, Sumatran tigers of the "Isle of the Tiger" exhibit, and an assortment of tropical birds such as: wrinkled hornbills, eclectus parrots, Victoria crowned pigeons, great argus pheasants, and Nicobar pigeons. It includes the Forest of Uco, a lush rainforest landscape that surrounds visitors along a 1-mile walking trail and includes reproductions of a South American mercado and a scientific expedition and ruins, and highlights several tropical animals including the Andean bear, saki monkey, spider monkeys, scarlet macaws, tarantulas, toco toucans, green aracaris, boa constrictors and blue-billed curassows.

=== Children's Trail ===
The Children's Trail lets children get close to many small animals from around the world, including emus, red-necked wallabies, a Calamian deer, red brocket deer, siamang gibbons, reticulated pythons, prehensile-tailed porcupines, Linne's two-toed sloths, tamanduas, spectacled owls, king vultures, black swans, rhinoceros hornbills, goats, cattle, sheep, and horses.

The trail features farm animals, a petting zoo, and child-oriented demonstrations on farming and agriculture.

=== Hunt Bass Hatchery House ("Ruby's House") ===
Hunt Bass Hatchery Caretaker's House

The Hunt Bass Hatchery Caretaker's House was built in 1935 and is located in the Phoenix Zoo grounds. Following the Great Depression, Governor George W. P. Hunt (Arizona's first elected governor) commissioned a bass fish hatchery to be established in Papago Park in 1932. The hatchery was built as a Works Progress Administration (WPA) project. The hatchery, operated by the Arizona Game and Fish Department, was a success, and was in operation until 1959.

The City of Phoenix leased the hatchery grounds, including its man-made lakes, to the Arizona Zoological Society in 1962 to establish the Zoo. The hatchery property is listed in the National Register of Historic Places. The Caretaker's House was renovated in the late 1990s, and is now known as "Ruby's House", as it is dedicated to the memory of Ruby, the famous painting elephant at the zoo (see her biography below). Ruby's House has become a popular venue for weddings, receptions, and other special events.

=== Other attractions ===
In addition to the trails, the zoo has several specialty attractions.

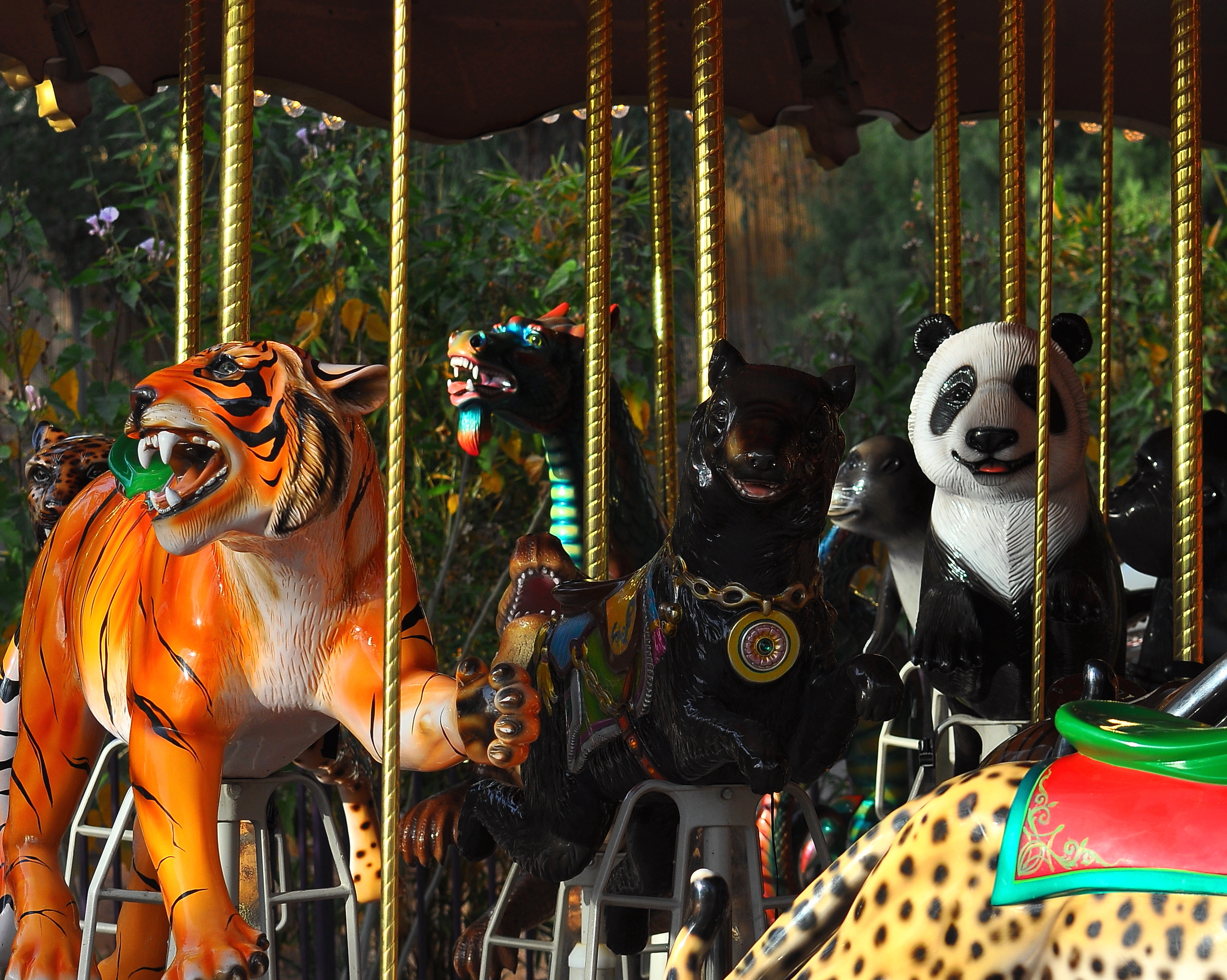
Carousel featuring endangered species

- Stingray Bay was opened in November 2006, and included more than 30 cownose rays and southern stingrays in a 15,000 gallon "touch tank." The "touch tank" lets visitors to touch the rays, whose barbs have been trimmed for safety. The exhibit is now permanent after installation of equipment to adjust water temperatures in the summer. In October 2007, bamboo sharks were added to the exhibit.
- An endangered species carousel is featured by the Leapin' Lagoon Splash Pad. The endangered species carousel was retired in 2024. It was replaced by a new carousel, the Lakeside Carousel.
- The Safari Train provides a guided tour of the zoo.
- Camel rides.
- Giraffe Encounter
- ZooLights – an annual December lighting show, which began in 1991.

=== Programs ===
The zoo has a wide array of youth programs and animal encounters, including field trips, Night Camp, an outreach program which includes a zoomobile for outreach to locations outside the city, a summer camp, and a large volunteer program for teenagers 13–17, known as the Zooteen program.

== Conservation efforts ==
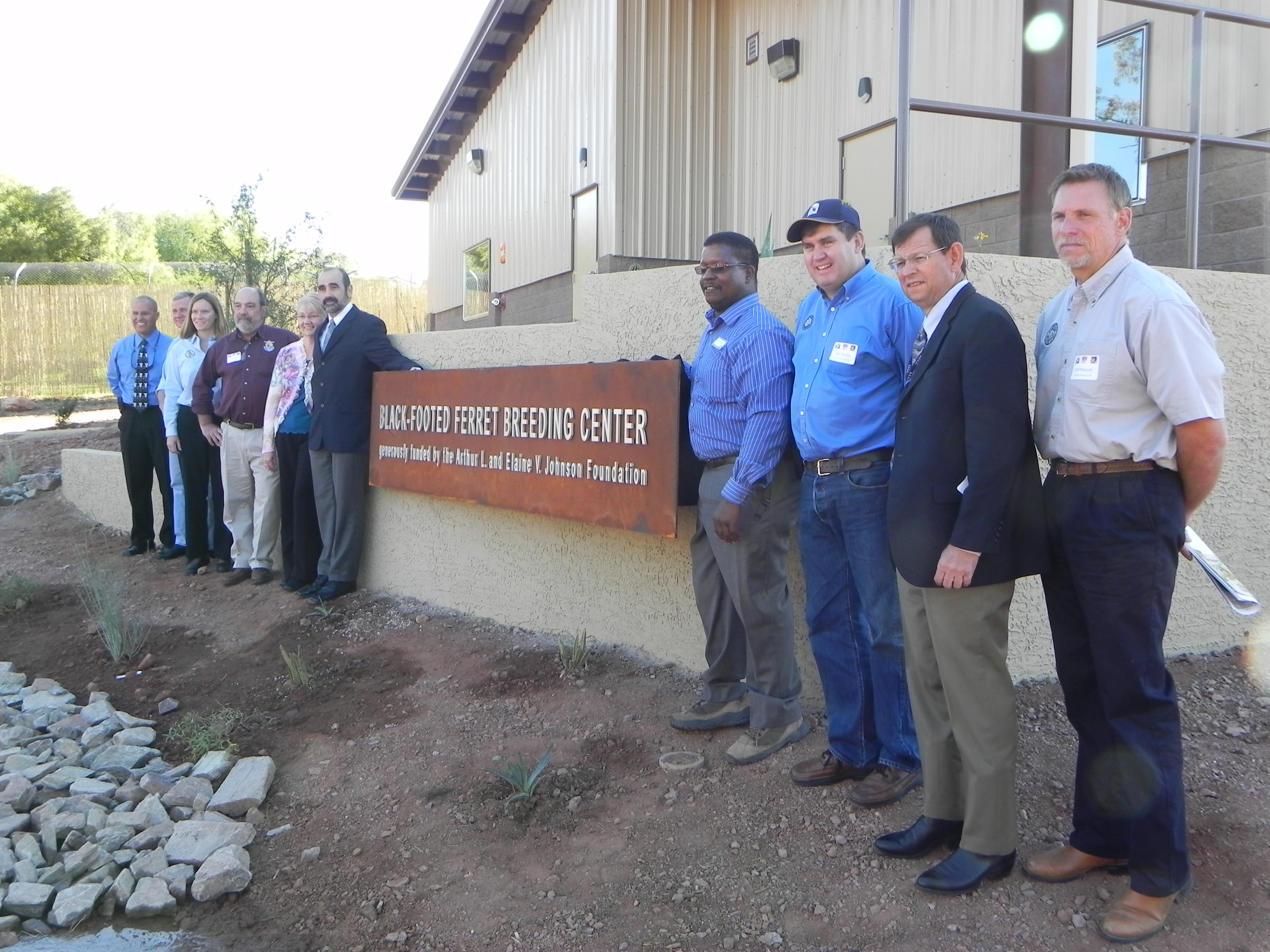
Dedication of the Black-footed Ferret Breeding Center, 2010

Since opening in 1962, the zoo has focused on animal conservation efforts. Programs at the Phoenix Zoo include captive breeding for reintroduction (for instance the Arabian oryx, black-footed ferret, Mexican wolf, Ramsey Canyon leopard frog, and thick-billed parrot, sanctuary for animals that are no longer breeding (for instance the African painted dogs at the zoo), and rescue and rehabilitation (for instance lead poisoning treatments for the California condor).

The Phoenix Zoo participates in the Species Survival Plan (SSP) for 29 species with the Association of Zoos and Aquariums. The goal of the SSP is to engage in animal husbandry and research projects for selected species that are in need of conservation efforts.

=== Reintroduction ===
In its first years, the zoo hosted a captive breeding program ("Operation Oryx") with the specific goal of reintroducing the almost extinct Arabian oryx to the wild. By the early 1990s this program was still one of only two programs (the other being the golden lion tamarin) to have gone through the full wilderness-zoo-wilderness sequence. Nine oryx had been caught or donated for the breeding program. However, two pairs were delayed, so the "World Herd" was started in Phoenix in 1963 with only five animals shipped to the zoo and two born quickly after. The two delayed pairs arrived in 1964 to increase the herd to 11 individuals. The program was very successful, and the zoo celebrated its 225th Arabian oryx birth in 2002. The Arabian oryx became extinct in the wild in 1972, and reintroduction efforts were started in 1982 when oryx were released to the wild in the Omani Central Desert and Coastal Hills. Additional captive herds have been discovered and used as the basis for reintroductions, for instance in Saudi Arabia, but there has been some interbreeding even with these herds and most of the Arabian oryx in the wild today have ancestors from the Phoenix Zoo.

=== Sanctuary ===
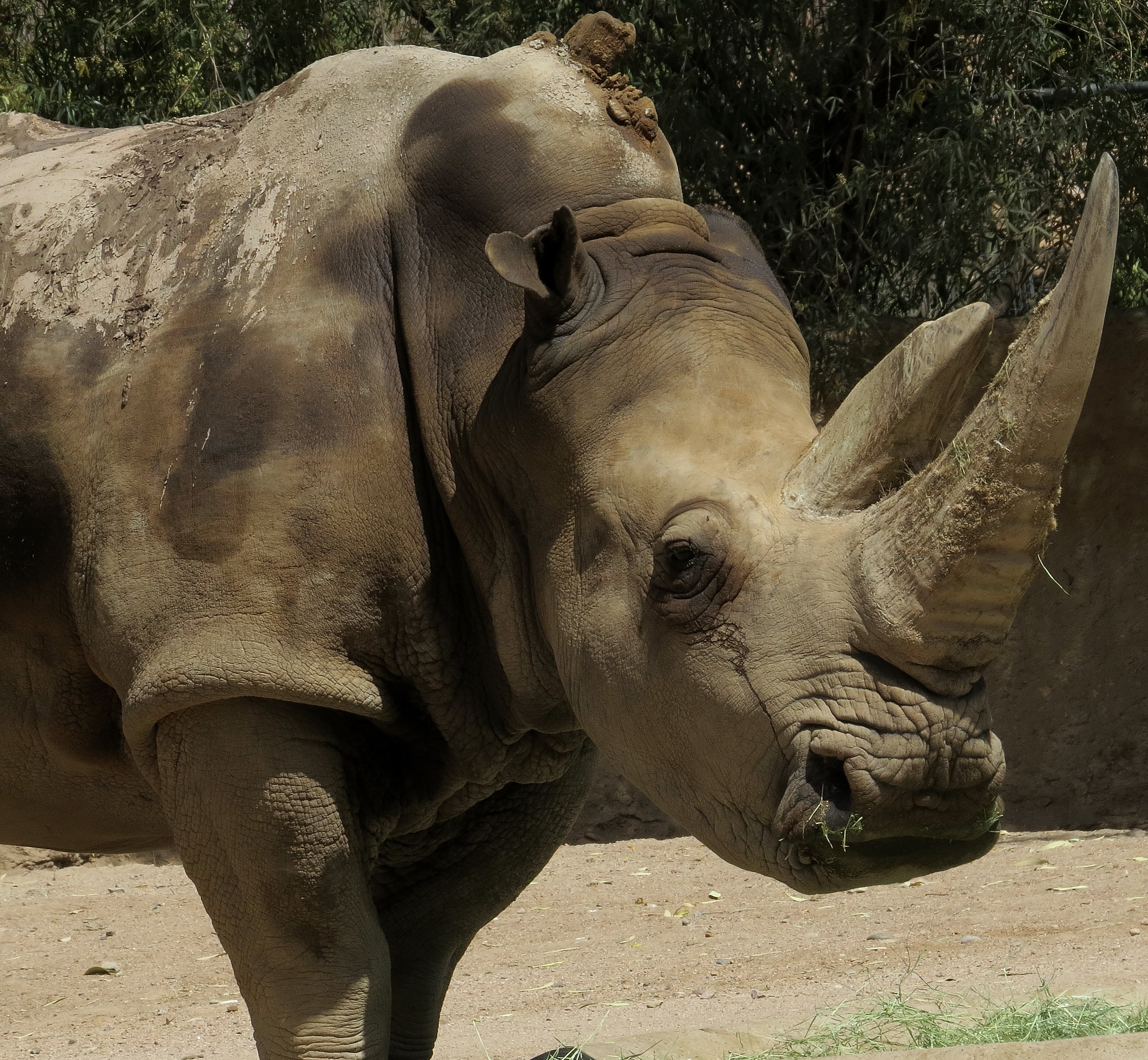
White rhinoceros

The zoo provides sanctuary to many animals that need a place to live for various reasons. Some (like the Arabian oryx, Bali mynah, rhinoceros hornbill, Mexican gray wolf, and white rhinoceros) participate in captive breeding programs, some (such as the African spotted dogs) have retired from such programs and need a home, some have behavioral problems, and some are being rehabilitated to return to the wild. Animals that are in of sanctuary are treated somewhat differently from other animals by the zoo. While normal exhibits balance the needs of the animals with those of visitors (for example, incorporating large viewing areas), the sanctuary exhibits are almost completely focused on the comfort and well-being of the animals.

After the 1998 death of Ruby, the zoo's famous painting elephant, the zoo abandoned its elephant breeding program and began to focus on elephant behavior. The zoo is currently home to three Asian elephants that have a variety of behavioral issues, the most common being aggressive toward other elephants. One elephant is a former performer at a circus and was subject to mistreatment, while the other two were captured in remote regions where they were never properly socialized.

=== Rescue and rehabilitation ===
The zoo provides lead poisoning treatment for California condors from the Grand Canyon area. These birds are one of the most endangered species on the planet, having at one time been reduced to 22 individuals in the wild. In February 2006, they treated a female (#149) who had been released in the 1990s and her son (#304) who survived a very rare birth in the wild. Both birds were captured in the Grand Canyon region and brought back to the zoo to be treated. A California condor (#133) was still being treated for lead poisoning at the zoo as of March 2010.

== Ruby the elephant ==
The Phoenix Zoo garnered worldwide attention for one of its animals, an Asian elephant named Ruby. Ruby came to the zoo in 1973, just months after being born in Thailand. After noticing Ruby doodling in the sand with sticks, her keeper decided to give her a brush and paint. Ruby quickly became known for her paintings, the sales of which raised over US$200,000 for the zoo. Art collectors all over the world joined 18-month waiting lists and paid hundreds of dollars for original prints.

In 1997, Ruby became pregnant. Near the end of her 22-month pregnancy, veterinarians discovered that the calf was dead. Ruby's uterus had ruptured, and the calf had slipped out and into Ruby's abdomen. Due to complications during the surgery to remove the 320-pound fetus, Ruby had to be euthanized.

== Fundraising for redesign ==
A Phoenix municipal bond election in March 2006 provided $2 million to the project, marking the first time the zoo has received public funds in its history. On 8 June 2006, then-zoo director Jeff Williamson announced a major fund-raising drive over the next 10 years to update the zoo's infrastructure and many of its aging exhibits. The zoo needs to raise $70 million to complete the project. In 2009, a shorter term goal is to raise $20 million by 2012 to pay for a number of improvements that are already under way.

== Gallery ==
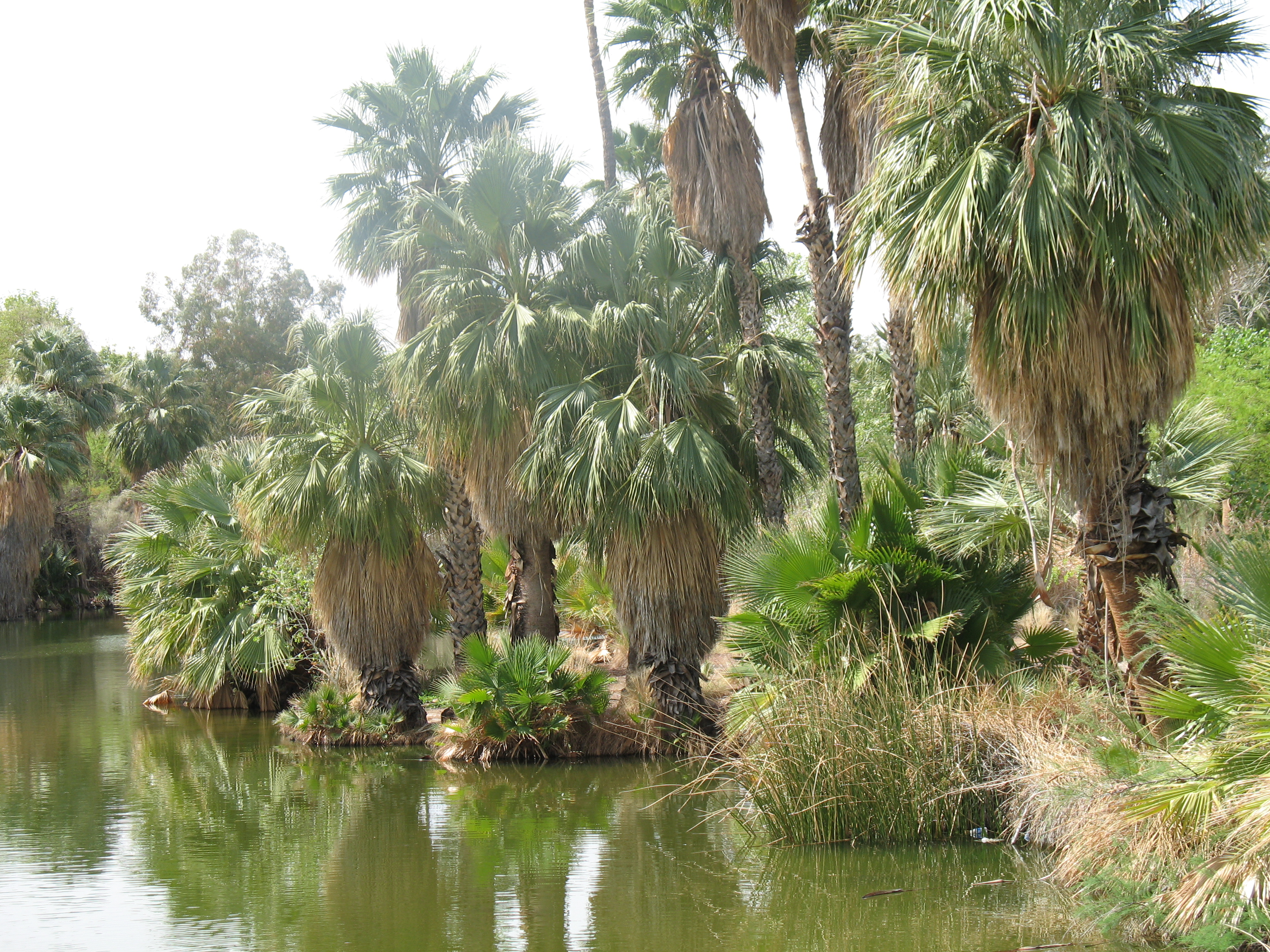
Palms near the zoo entrance

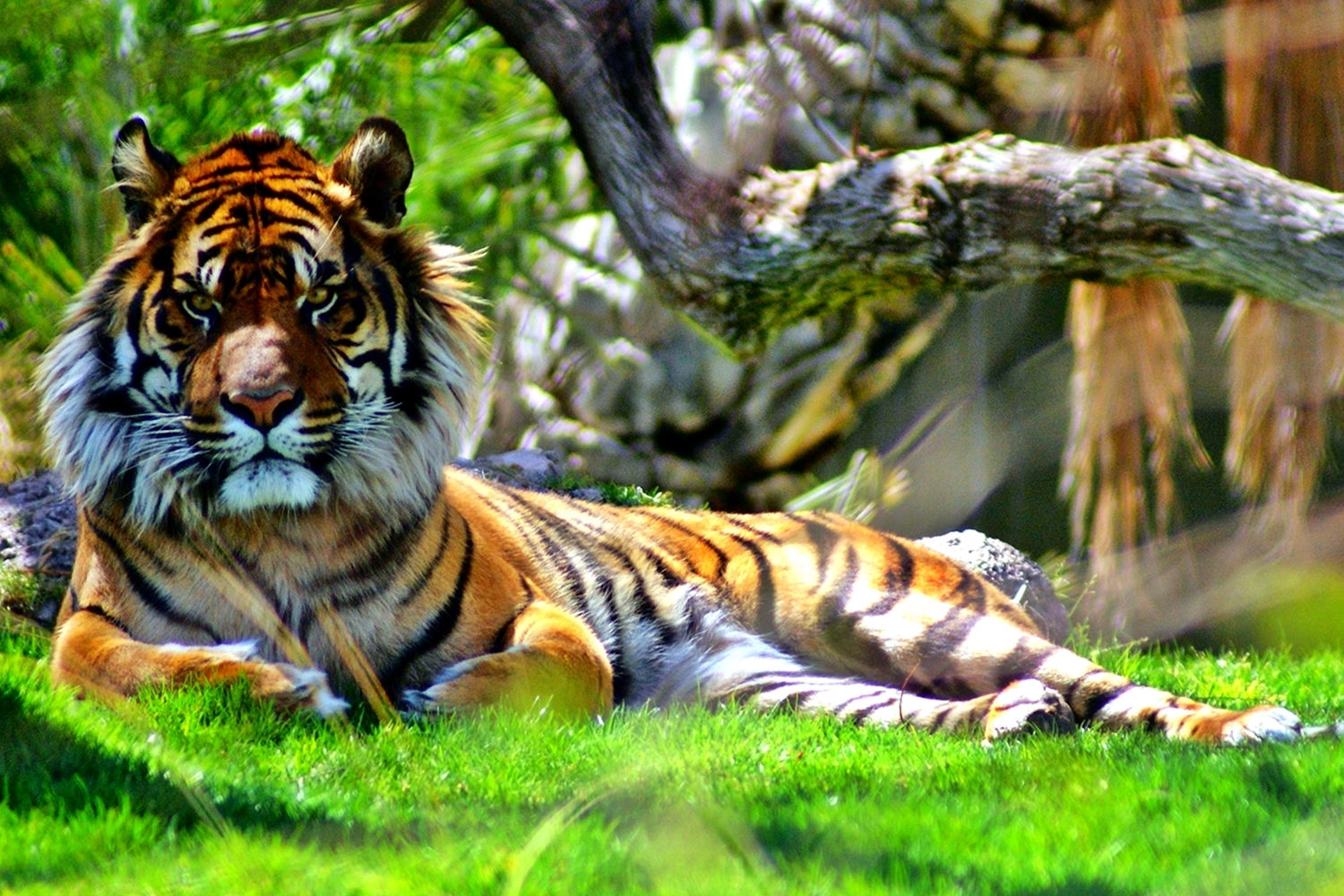
Sumatran Tiger (Panthera tigris sumatrae)

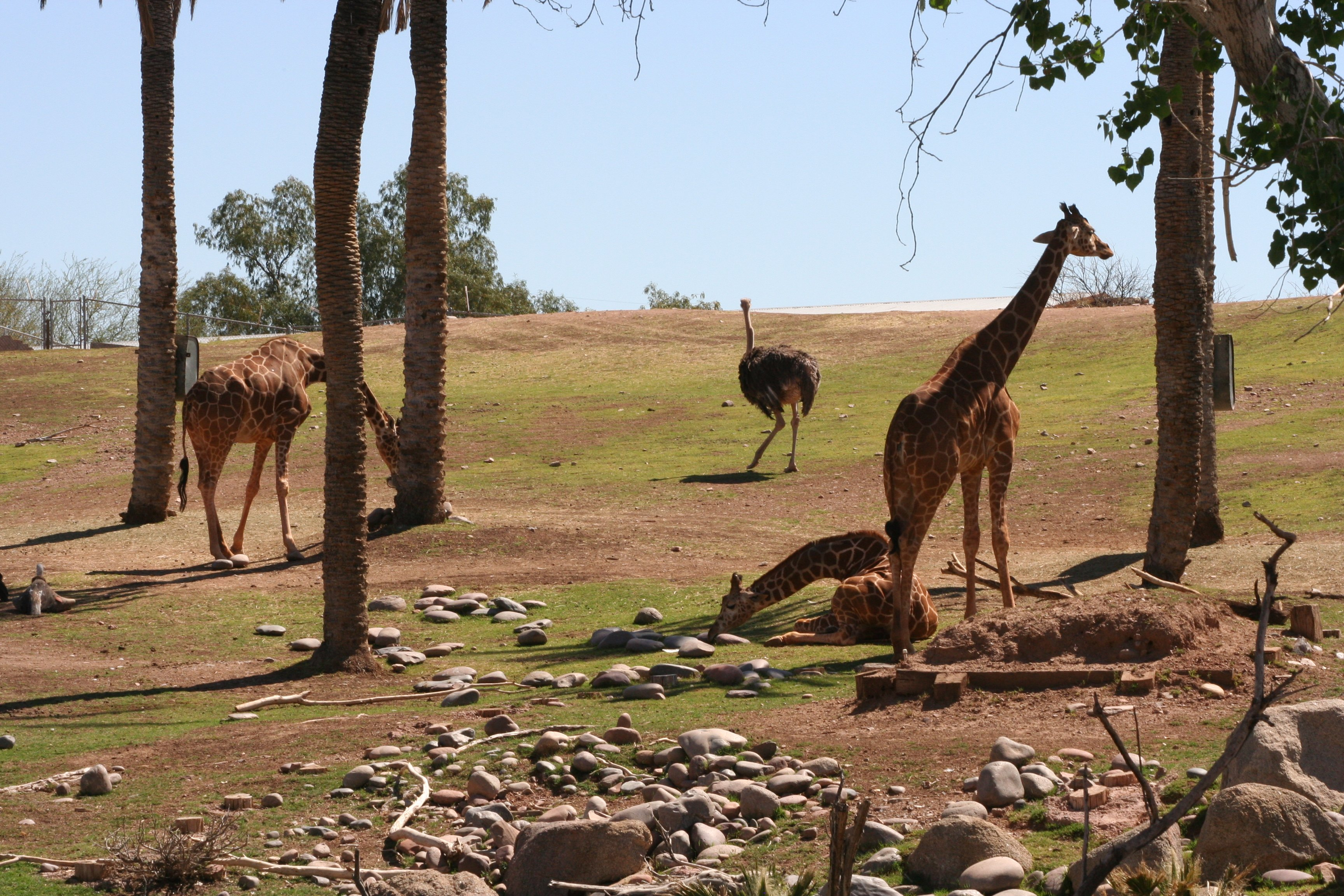
African Savanna habitat

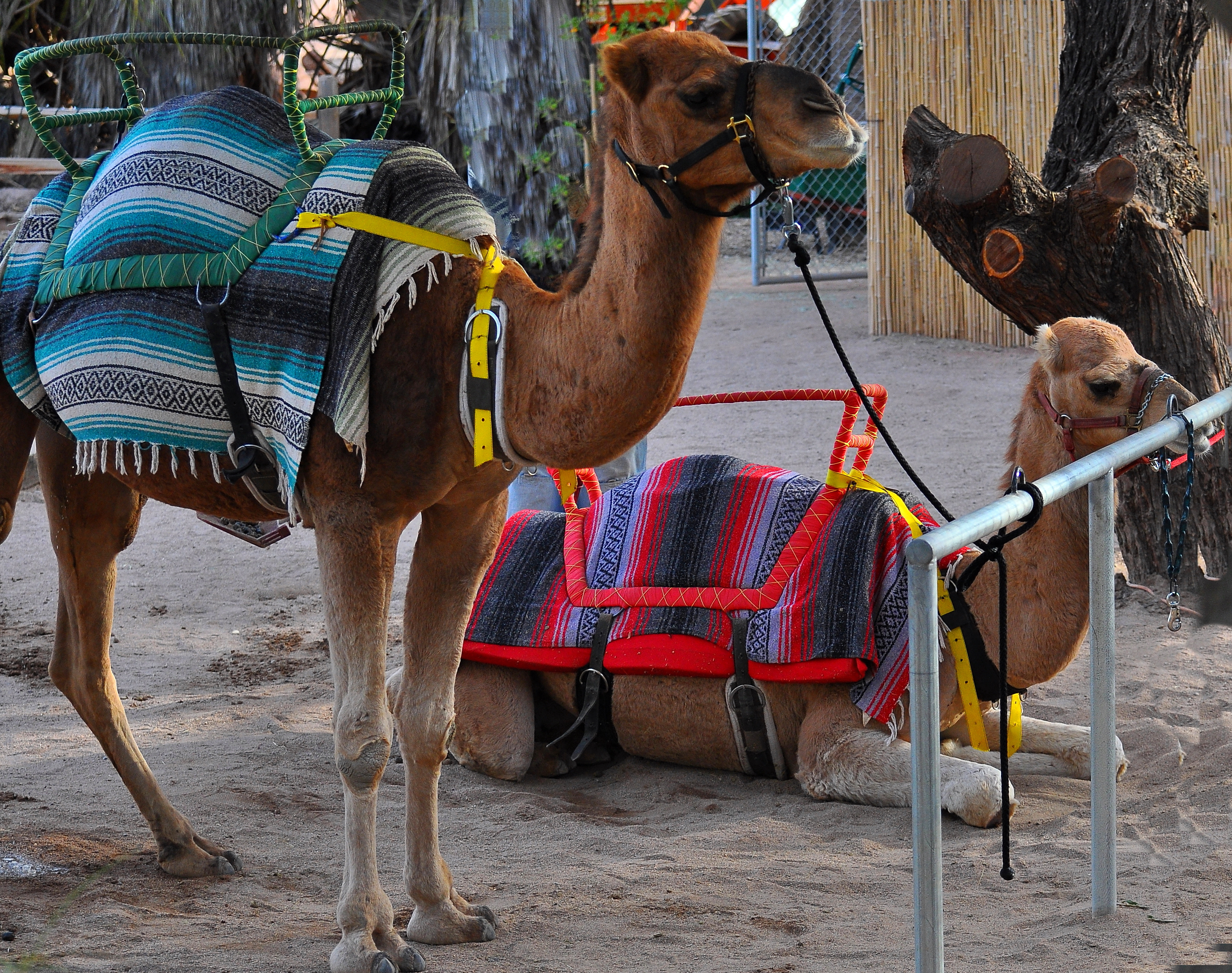
Camel rides

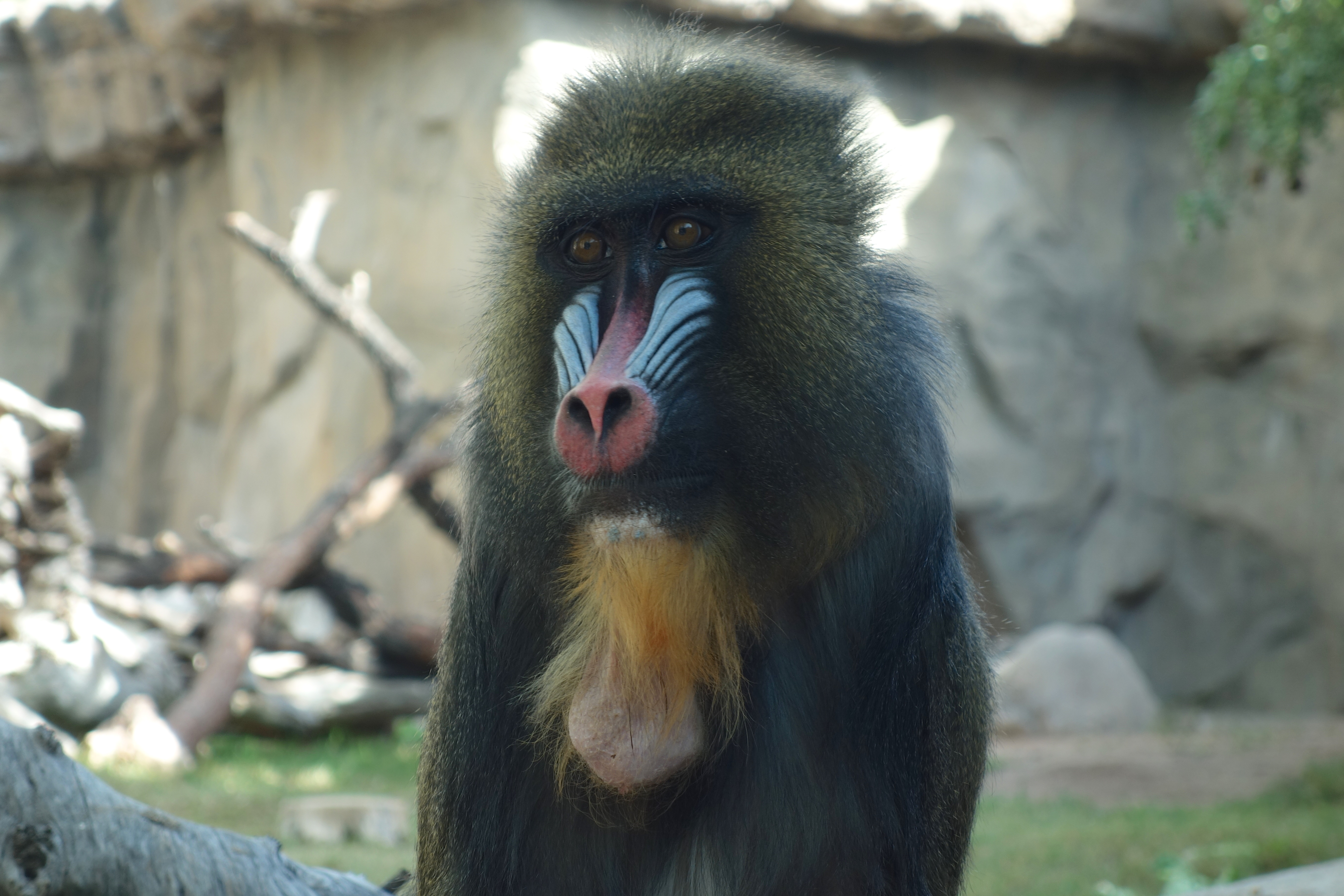
Mandrill (Mandrillus sphinx)

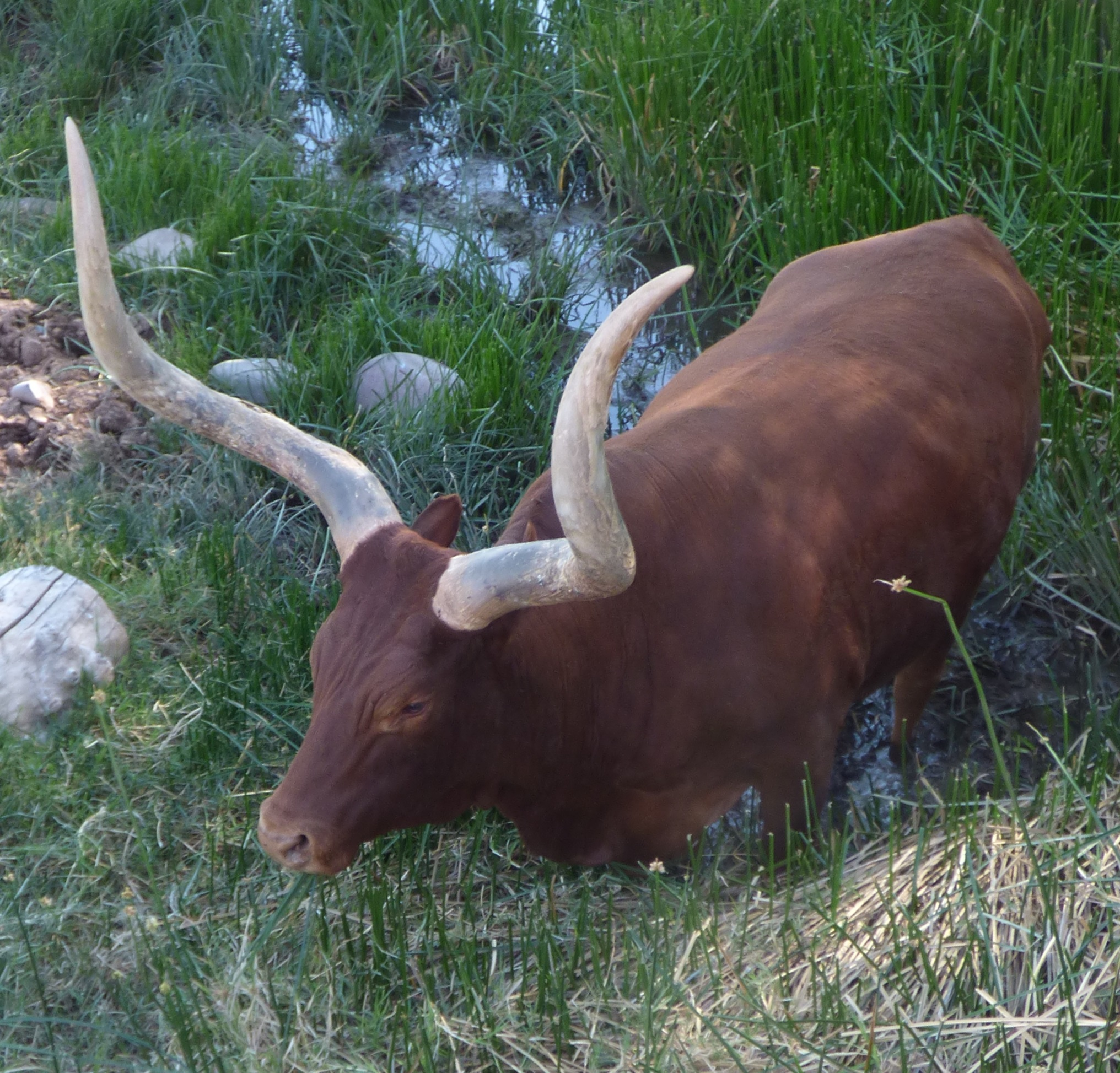
Watusi cattle

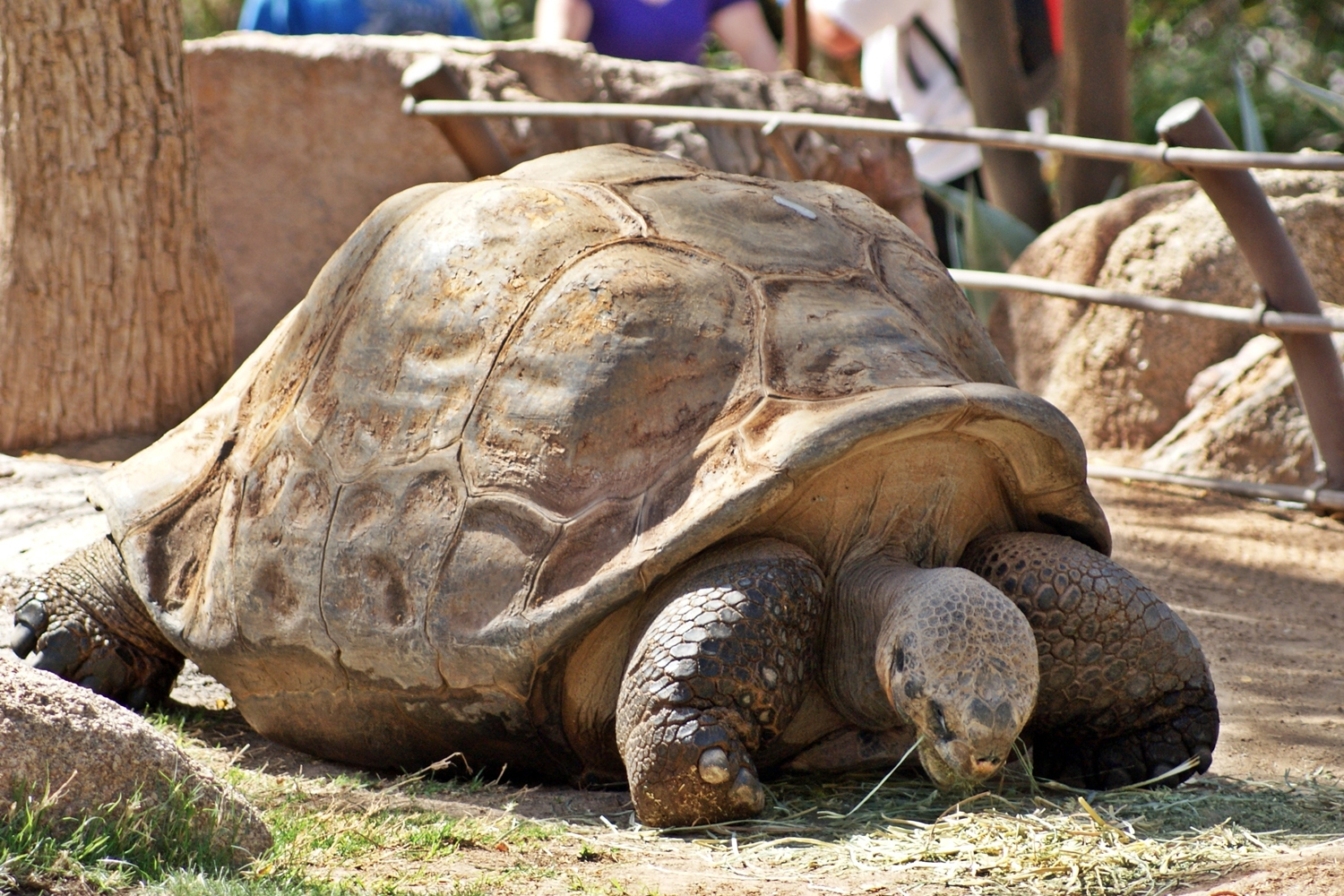
Galápagos tortoise (Chelonoidis nigra)

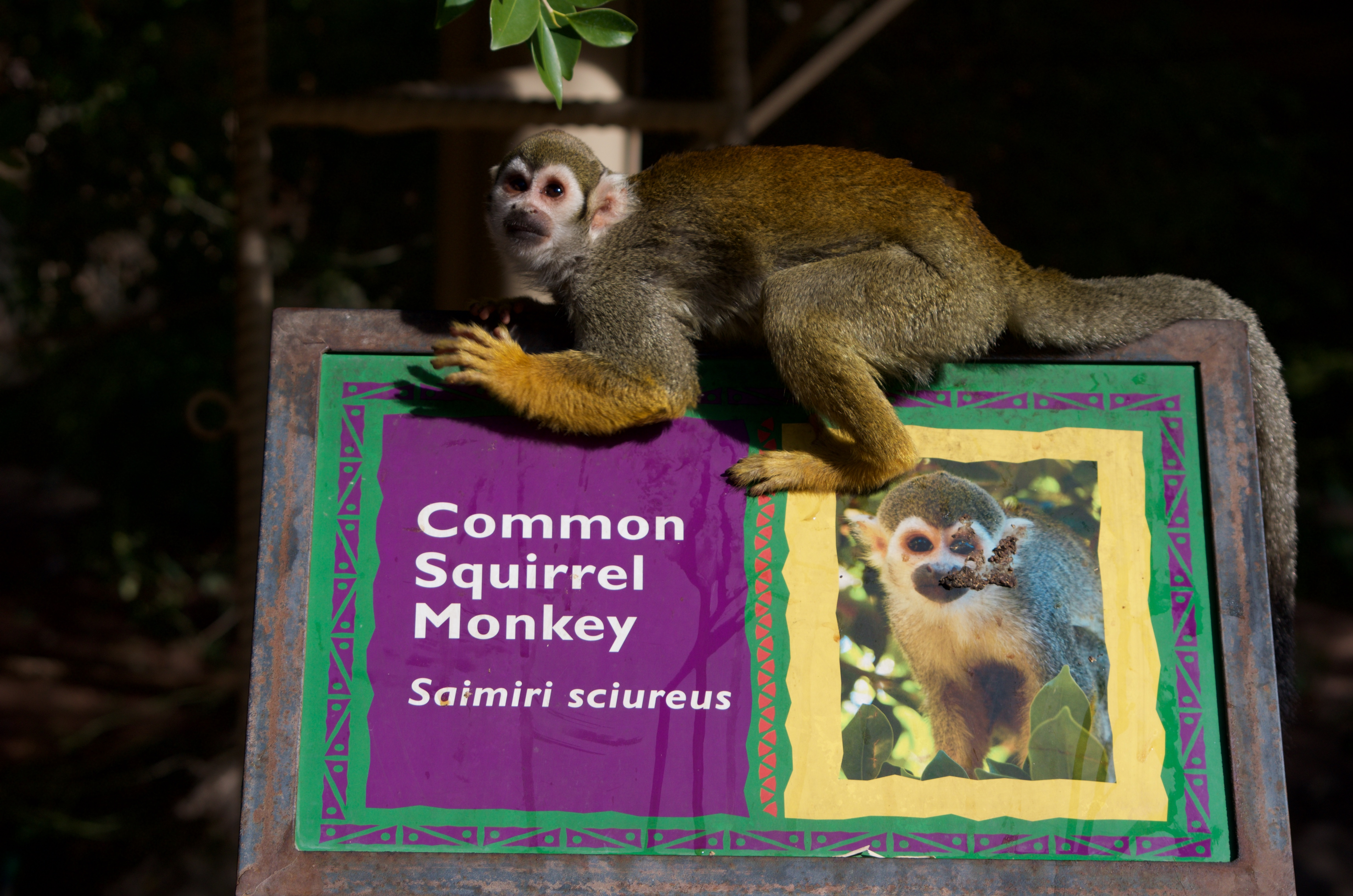
Common squirrel monkey

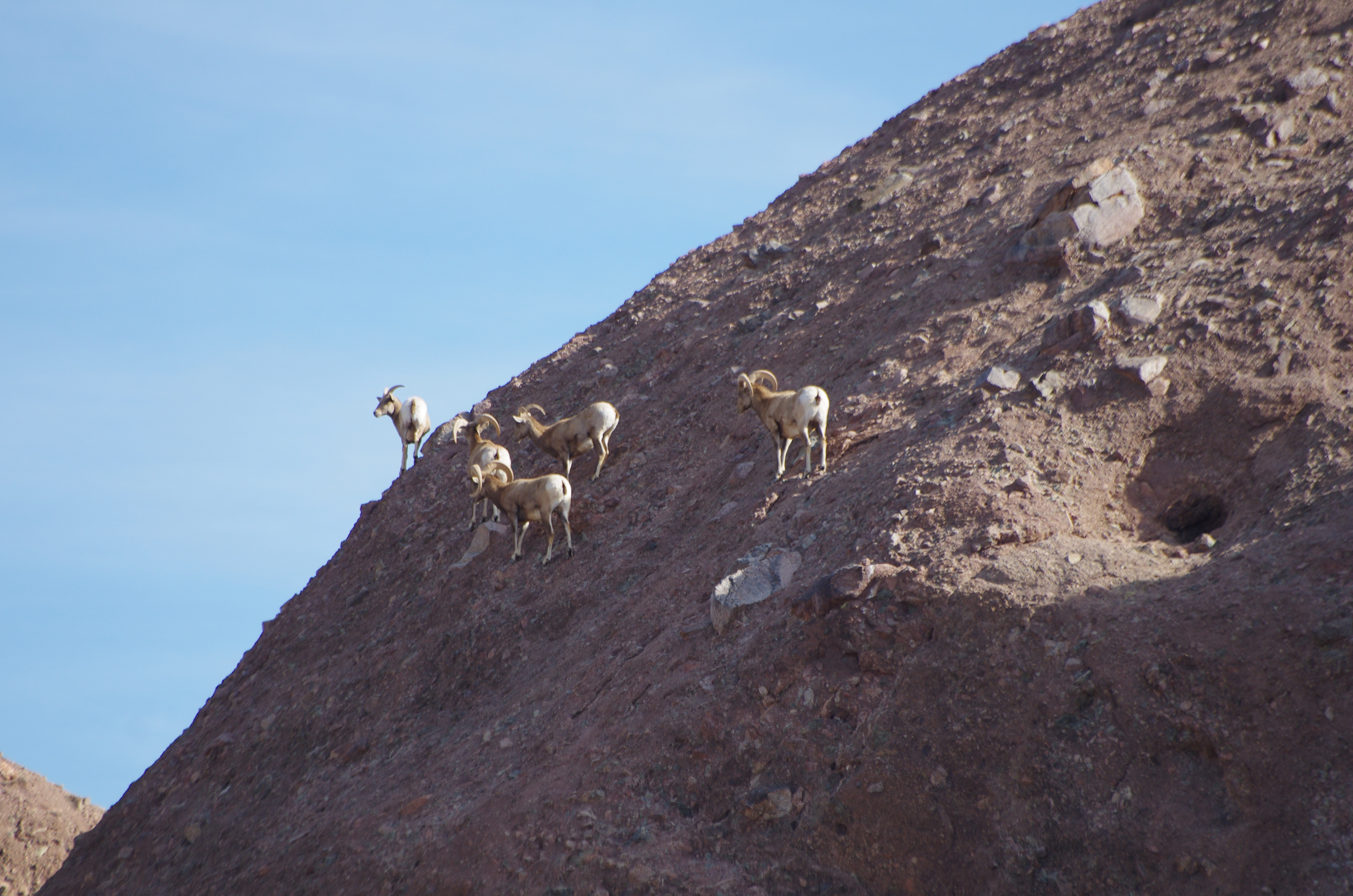
Bighorn sheep (Ovis canadensis) exhibit

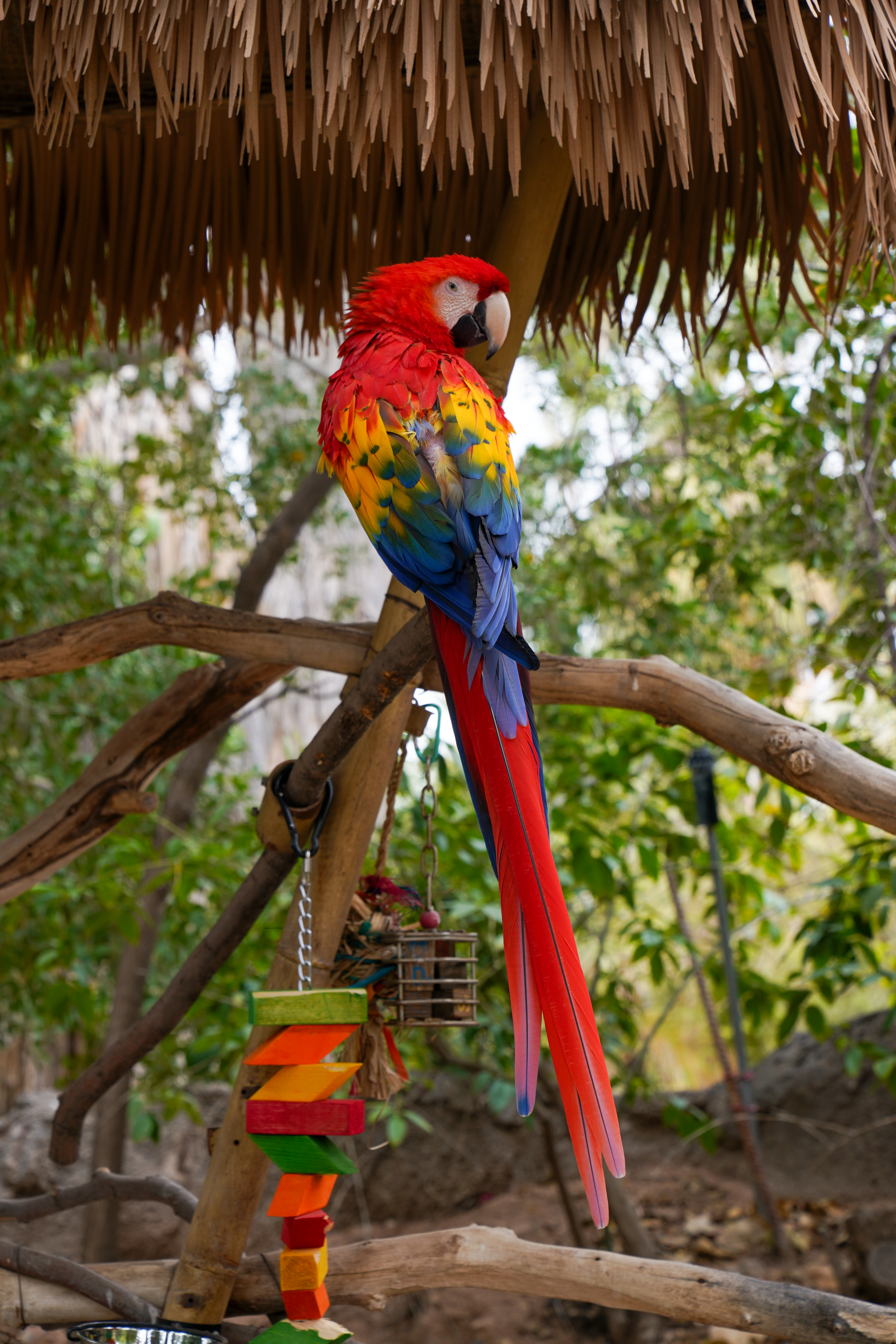
Scarlet macaw (Ara macao)

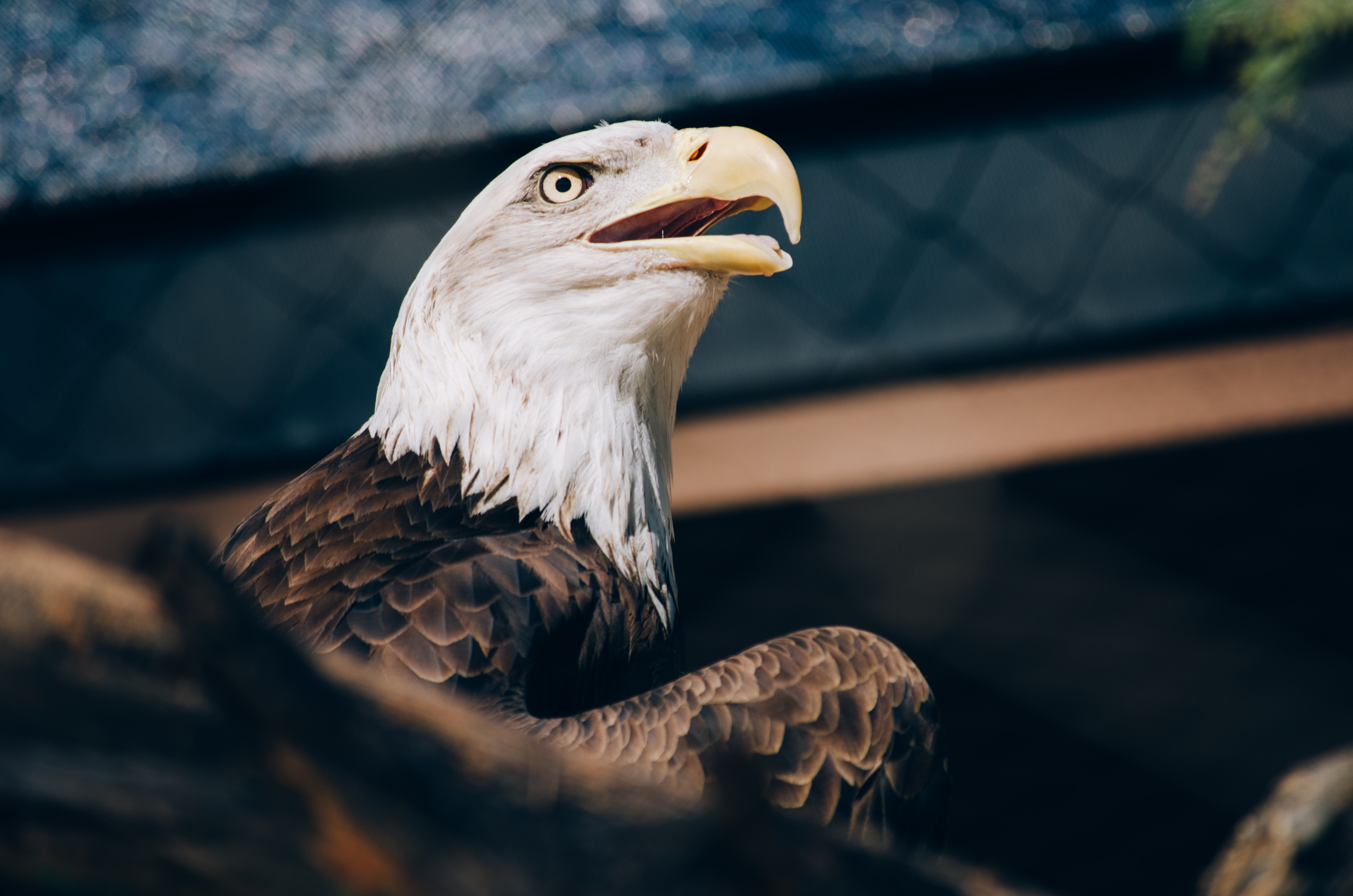
Bald eagle

== Controversies ==
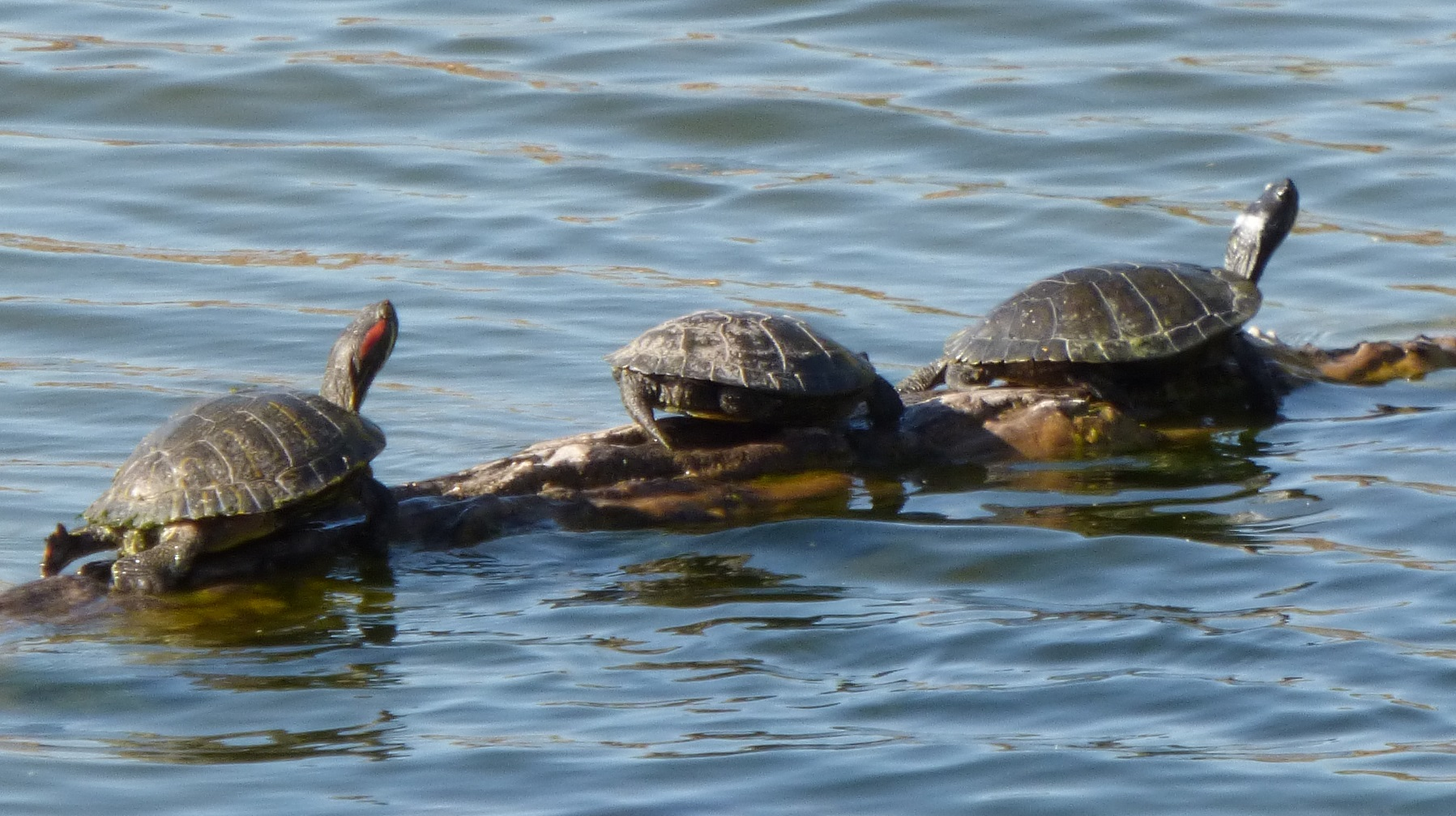
Turtles balancing on a log at the zoo

In 1997, then-zoo director Jeff Williamson merged some departments of the zoo in a business move that was intended to provide a clearer direction for zoo operations. Many of the zoo's approximately 350 volunteers interpreted the merger as an elimination of volunteer training efforts. As a result, more than half of them left the zoo by 1999.

In May 2005, a veterinarian named Kris Nelson filed a series of complaints against the zoo regarding animal care and management. Her complaints were backed by two former zoo employees: a chief veterinarian and an animal nutritionist. The complaints stated that dozens of animals had been harmed or died as a result of poor management, feeding practices, and quarantine procedures. Another veterinarian, 15-year zoo employee Kathy Orr, discounted many of Nelson's claims as being either invalid, or having been corrected already.

The following June, an independent committee of zoological experts from other areas of the country cleared the Phoenix Zoo of the charges. In a published report, the committee outlined some minor flaws in the zoo's operation, but reported no "serious deficiencies".

== See also ==
- List of historic properties in Phoenix, Arizona
