= Al Maha Petroleum =

Petroleum company based in Oman

Al Maha Petroleum Products Marketing Company
- Type: Public
- Industry: Petroleum retail
- Founded: 1993 (separated from Oman Refinery Company in 1999)
- Headquarters: Muscat, Oman
- Revenue: R.O. 417.87 million
- Net income: R.O. 7.65 million
- Owner: Government of Oman (65%); ABS Lubricants Company (35%)
- Website: http://www.almaha.com.om

Al Maha Petroleum Products Marketing Company, also known as Al Maha, is a petroleum company based in Oman. The company is named for the Arabian Oryx (al Maha).

Al Maha maintains a network of over 200 service stations throughout Oman, including convenience stores and auto services. Al Maha also has commercial and aviation fuel divisions.

== History ==
Al Maha was founded on June 22, 1993, by a Royal Decree from Sultan Qaboos bin Said Al Said. The companies origins lie within the Oman Refinery Company, of which Al-Maha has been a part of since before 1993. The company was established as a fully government-owned entity. ABS Lubricants Company (UAE) bought a 35% stake in Al-Maha in 1999, with 65% remaining with the government of the Sultanate of Oman. In 2000, Al Maha started cooperating with Gulf Caltex Company to supply aviation fuel for Muscat International Airport. In 2004, Al-Maha Petroleum Products Marketing Company was converted from a limited liability to a general Omani joint-stock company now named Al-Maha Petroleum Products Marketing Company S.A.O.G.

In 2013, Al Maha opened an average of one new station every two months, taking the total to 182 by the end of the year. In 2014, Al Maha won a new fuel supply contract for Oman Air's fuel requirements at Muscat airport, valued at around OMR 83 million. In 2017, the company signed two major agreements with Rural Areas Electricity Company (Raeco) and with Oman National Transport Company (Mwasalat) at OMR 91 million.

The contract with Raeco (OMR 73 million) details the delivery of 380 million litres of gas oil over a two-year period, which started on September 1, 2017. The second contract with Mwasalat (OMR 18 million) was for the design, building and operation of a new fuel station at the companies headquarters and the supply of fuel for all buses, starting from May 31, 2017, over a 10-year period (up to a total of 100 million liters of fuel).

Al Maha was one of two main sponsors for the second World Military Cup for Soccer 2017 (CISM) which was held in Oman from January 13 to 29.

In 2018, Al Maha signed a five-year agreement with Mwasalat to build a solar energy powered and air conditioned bus stop in Muscat. The deal is valued at around OMR 125,000. In the same year, the two companies also signed an agreement for Al Maha to construct a new fuel depot at Mwasalat's headquarters.

Al Maha Petroleum Products Marketing Company signed a partnership agreement with Petronas Lubricants International (PLI) in April 2019. Making Al Maha an authorised distributor of PLI's products. A contract between Al Maha and the Petroleum Development Oman (PDO) was signed in November 2020, which is expected to generate initial capital investments of $20.8 million and an expected revenue of $90.9 million. The contract is to run from 23 August 2020 until 22 August 2035, with a possible extension until 2040.

In May 2025, Al Maha signed two fuel supply contracts with Galfar Engineering and Contracting Company SAOG worth OMR 32.62 million.

A 50% partnership deal to establish a vehicle technical inspection center company with Shomoul International LLC and Al Taif Tourism Investment LLC was signed by Al Maha in November 2025.

Al Maha signed an electric vehicle fast-charging partnership with National Green Mobility Company in September 2025.

In October 2025, Al Maha launched its PowerPlus 98 high-octane petrol.

== Corporate structure ==
=== Overview of personnel ===
The board of directors consists of Chairman Saif Salim Al Harthi, Deputy-Chairman Sheikh Mohammed Bin Sultan Bin Kalifa Al Nahyan, and board members Ibrahim Mohammed Al-Harthi, Mohammed Saif Al Kaabi, Nabil Hamed Al Mahrooqi, Abdullah Mohammed Al Mamari and Sultan Khalifa Saleh Al-Tai. The company is led and managed by acting chief executive officer (CEO) Hamed Salim Al Maghdri.

=== Shareholders ===
47.2% Government of the Sultanate of Oman
40.0% ABS Lubricants
12.8% Civil Service Employees Pension Fund

(As of December 31, 2017)

=== Finance ===
In 2003, Al Maha was ranked 63 on the Top 100 most profitable Gulf companies at the King Fahd Cultural Center exhibition in Al-Riyadh, Saudi Arabia. In 2005, Oman Economic Magazine placed the company 5th among the 20 most profitable companies in Oman, and in 2007, Al Maha was ranked 6th. The Oman Economic Review Magazine also placed the company 6th among the most profitable companies in Oman.

Al Maha reported a profit, after taxes, of OMR 8.1 million for the 2016 financial year compared to that of OMR 9.2 million recorded for the previous year. In the first quarter of 2017, the company achieved a 20% increase in revenue compared to 2016, totalling OMR 101.06 million. In October 2020, Al Maha reported a 28% decrease in profits, mainly associated with the decrease in retail sales and the changes in the aviation sector. Economically, things improved minimally in the third quarter once COVID-19 containment measures and reduced restrictions were put in place, restrictions on air travel still continue.

In 2025, Al Maha reported a 2% increase in net profit compared to 2024 with a total of 6.16 million, and a 2% decrease in revenue to 505.13 million.

== Operations ==
Al Maha operates a network of over 200 service stations (out of a total of around 600 commercially licensed stations) throughout Oman and is one of the main suppliers for the Oman Petroleum Development Company. It also supplies fuels and other additives to the tourism, fishing and transport industry in harbors and ports in Khasab, Diba, Shinas, Qurayyat, Sur Port, Marina Bandar Al-Raodhah, Raysoot, Saham and Sohar ports.

Al Maha also supplies aviation fuel to Muscat International Airport, cooperating with Gulf Caltex Company. Al Maha employees also regularly attend the Caltex training center for aviation security techniques and procedures in Dubai.

The Al Maha service stations network also offers different types of fuel cards.

== Petroleum Field ==
- One of the first to offer unleaded petrol
- Approved supplier to international and local commercial airline companies as well as military aircraft
- Active member of various industrial enmities, such as Aircraft Fuel Provision Companies of Arab states of the Persian Gulf (2000) and Arab Union for Air Transport (2001)
