= Al Maha Airways =

Airline based in Qatar

Al Maha Airways المها
IATA	ICAO	Call sign
QR	QTR	QATARI
- Founded: 2014
- Ceased operations: 2017
- Hubs: Hamad International Airport
- Fleet size: 4
- Destinations: 11 (planned)
- Parent company: Qatar Airways
- Headquarters: Doha, Qatar

Al Maha Airways was a planned subsidiary airline of Qatar Airways to serve the Saudi Arabian travel market. It was based initially at King Abdulaziz International Airport in Jeddah, and then at Hamad International Airport in Doha. The beginning of operations was postponed several times following its initial announcement in 2014, and then cancelled entirely by February 2017 following issues obtaining its operational license and the Qatar diplomatic crisis.

== History ==
Al Maha Airways was founded as a Saudi Arabian subsidiary of Qatar Airways in 2014, but never began operations. Al Maha, which means "oryx" in Arabic, was to sport the Qatar Airways logo but would be green instead of the Qatar Airways signature burgundy colour, to match Saudi Arabia's national colors. On 29 April 2015, Al Maha Airways took delivery of four Airbus A320-200 aircraft.

The airline was set to begin operations in the fourth quarter of 2014, but then the starting date was postponed to summer 2016. In February 2017, Qatar Airways announced that the Al Maha Airways project was cancelled and the airline would not begin operations, due to ongoing issues gaining its operational license and the Qatar diplomatic crisis.

== Destinations ==
The initial destinations were planned to be Jeddah, Riyadh, Dammam, Madina, Abha, Al Qassim, Doha, Dubai (Al Maktoum) and Muscat.

Country	City	Airport	Notes	
Saudi Arabia	Abha	Abha International Airport	Notes	
Saudi Arabia	Al Qassim	Prince Naif bin Abdulaziz International Airport	Notes	
Saudi Arabia	Dammam	King Fahd International Airport	Notes	
Saudi Arabia	Jeddah	King Abdulaziz International Airport	Notes	
Saudi Arabia	Madina	Prince Mohammad bin Abdulaziz International Airport	Notes	
Saudi Arabia	Riyadh	King Khalid International Airport	Notes	
Qatar	Doha	Hamad International Airport	Notes	Hub
(United Arab Emirates) UAE	Dubai	Al Maktoum International Airport	Notes	
Oman	Muscat	Muscat International Airport	Notes	

== Fleet ==
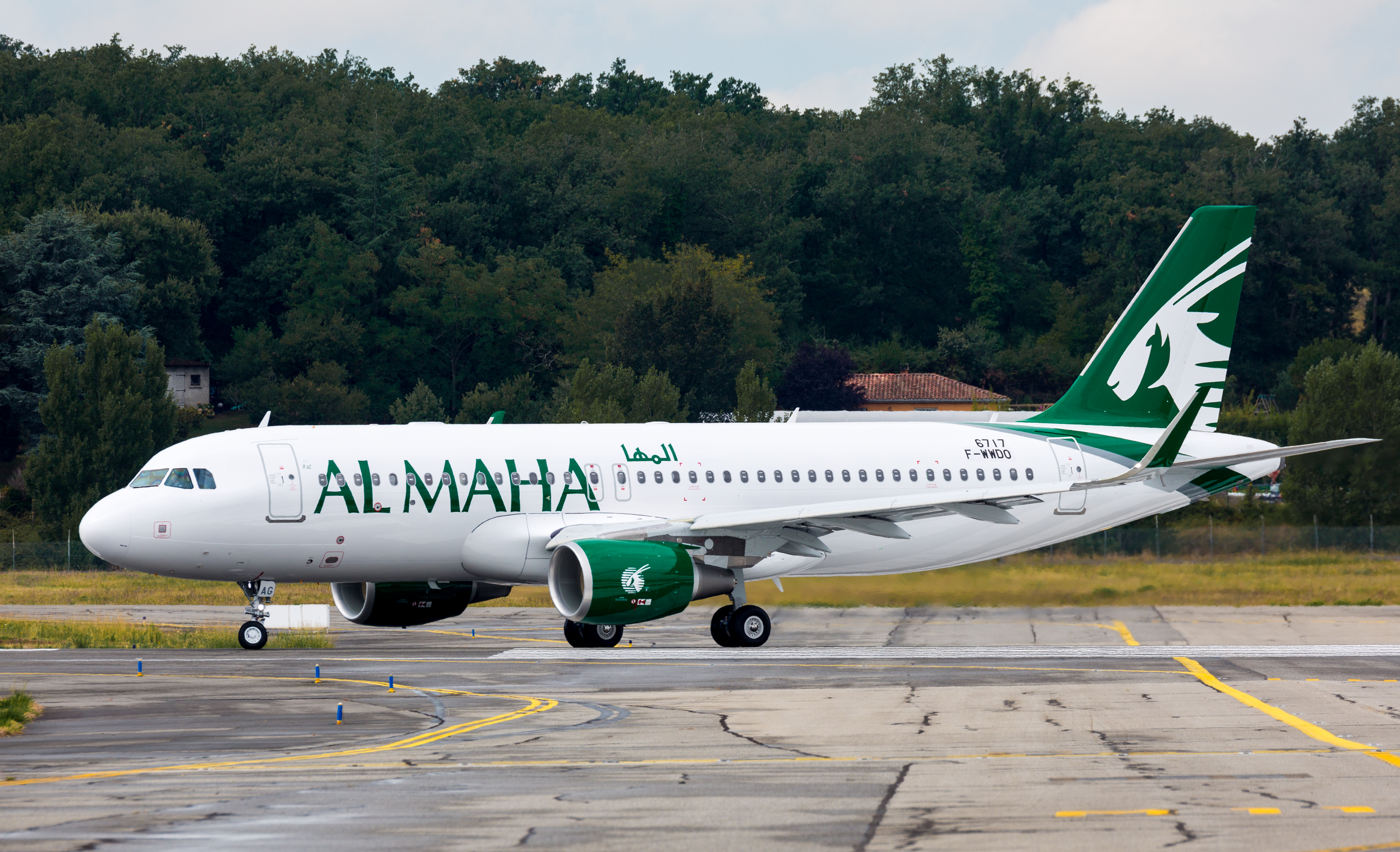
Al Maha Airways Airbus A320-200, the first out of the four A320s which was delivered but never started operations

As of November 2016 the Al Maha Airways fleet consisted of the following aircraft:

Al Maha Airways fleet
Aircraft	Number	Orders	Passengers			Notes
Aircraft	Number	Orders	C	Y	Total	Notes
Airbus A320-200	4, repainted, without the green oryx livery	44 —	12	168	180	Now in service with Qatar Airways
Total	4	—				
