= Mahazat as-Sayd Protected Area =

Coordinates: 22°12′12″N 41°49′36″E

The Mahazat as-Sayd Protected Area is a 220,000 ha large protected area in central Saudi Arabia. The area is totally fenced and protection from livestock grazing has allowed a spectacular recovery of native vegetation. The reserve is now dominated by grasslands, which are a reminder of how most of the Arabian peninsula may have looked once.

Mahazat as-Sayd is one of the few places where the Arabian oryx has been reintroduced. In addition the reem gazelle and red-necked ostrich have been reintroduced in the reserve.

The area was once also home to wolves and two more species of gazelles, the idmi and dorcas gazelle. It is likely that striped hyenas and cheetahs once also inhabited the area.
