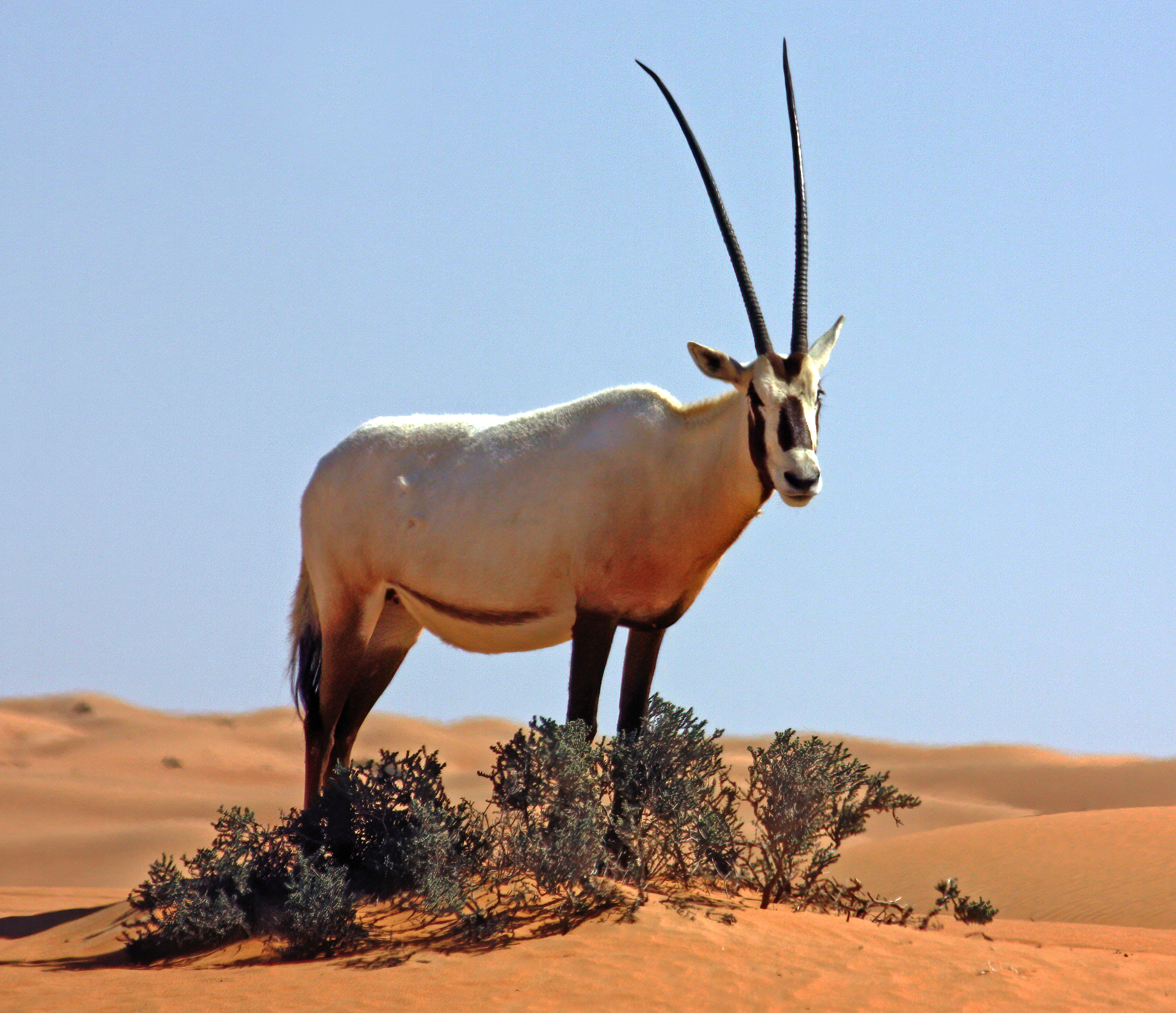
- Male in Dubai Desert Conservation Reserve

Conservation status
- Vulnerable (IUCN 3.1)
- CITES Appendix I

Scientific classification
- Kingdom: Animalia
- Phylum: Chordata
- Class: Mammalia
- Order: Artiodactyla
- Family: Bovidae
- Subfamily: Hippotraginae
- Genus: Oryx
- Species: O. leucoryx

Binomial name
- Oryx leucoryx (Pallas, 1777)

= Arabian oryx =

Species of antelope

The Arabian oryx or white oryx (Oryx leucoryx) is a medium-sized antelope with a distinct shoulder bump, long, straight horns, and a tufted tail. It is a bovid, and the smallest member of the genus Oryx, native to desert and steppe areas of the Arabian Peninsula. The Arabian oryx was extinct in the wild by the early 1970s, but was saved in zoos and private reserves, and was reintroduced into the wild starting in 1980.

In 1986, the Arabian oryx was classified as endangered on the IUCN Red List, and in 2011, it was the first animal to revert to vulnerable status after previously being listed as extinct in the wild. It is listed in CITES Appendix I. In 2016, populations were estimated at 1,220 individuals in the wild, including 850 mature individuals, and 6,000–7,000 in captivity worldwide.

== Etymology ==
The taxonomic name Oryx leucoryx is from the Greek όρυξ (orux), meaning gazelle or antelope, and λευκός (leukos), meaning white. The Arabian oryx is also called the white oryx in English, דישון (dishon) in Hebrew, and is known as مھا/مھاة (maha) or وضيحي (wudhaihi) in Arabic.

== Taxonomy ==
The name "oryx" was introduced by Peter Simon Pallas in 1767 for the common eland as Antilope oryx. He also scientifically described the Arabian oryx as Oryx leucoryx, giving its range as "Arabia, and perhaps Libya". In 1816, Henri Marie Ducrotay de Blainville subdivided the antelope group, adopted Oryx as a genus name, and changed the species name Antilope oryx to Oryx gazella. In 1826, Martin Lichtenstein confused matters by transferring the name Oryx leucoryx to the scimitar oryx, now Oryx dammah. The Zoological Society of London obtained the first living individual in Europe in 1857. Not realizing this might be the Oryx leucoryx of previous authors, John Edward Gray proposed calling it Oryx beatrix after Princess Beatrice of the United Kingdom. Oldfield Thomas renamed the scimitar oryx as Oryx algazal in 1903 and gave the Arabian oryx its original name.

== Description ==
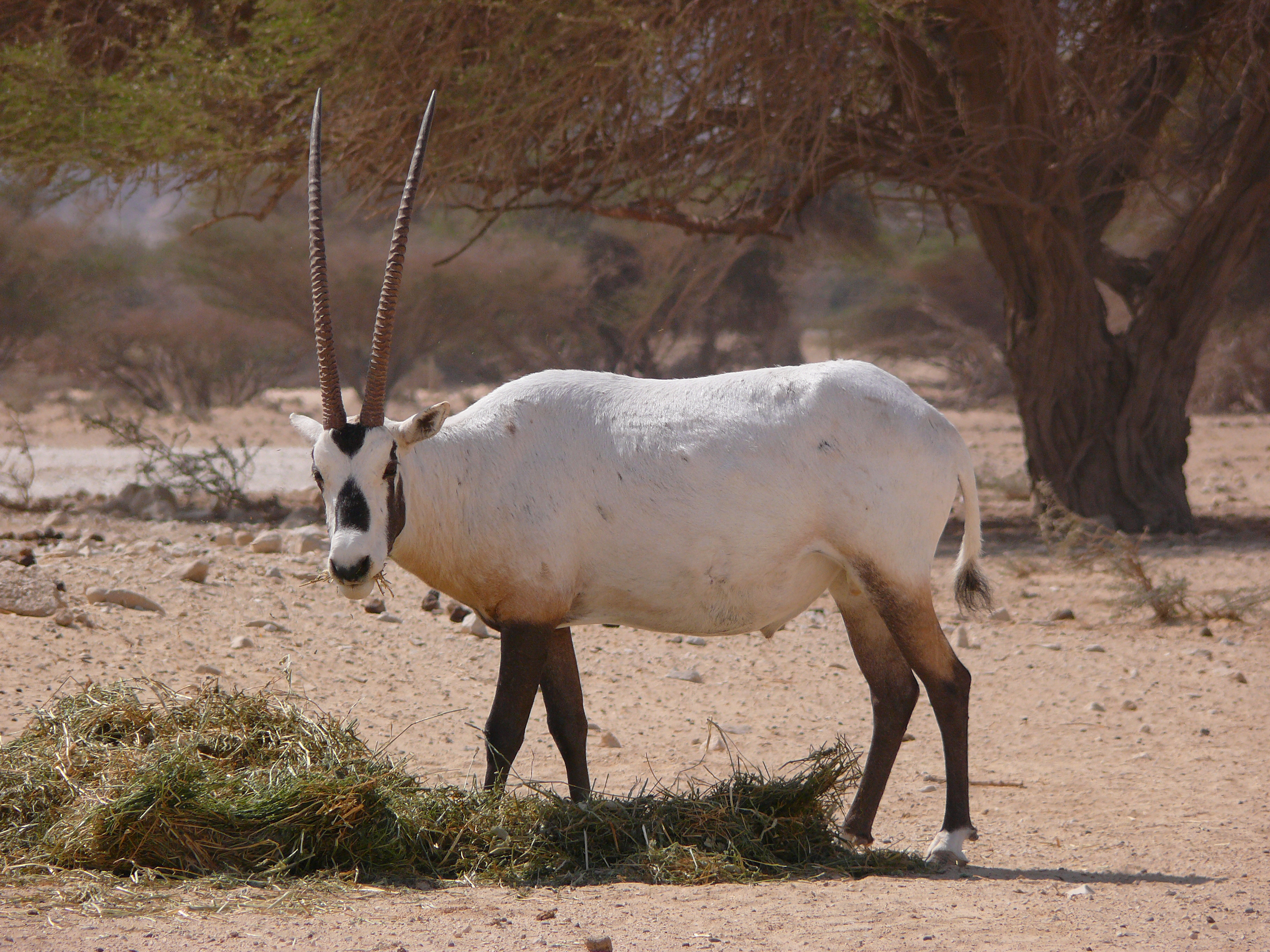
In Yotvata Hai-Bar Nature Reserve in Israel

The coat of the Arabian oryx is an almost luminous white, the undersides and legs are brown, and black stripes occur where the head meets the neck, on the forehead, on the nose, and going from the horn down across the eye to the mouth. Both sexes have long, straight or slightly curved, ringed horns which are 0.61–1.49 m (2–4.9 ft). It stands between 0.79 and 1.25 m (2.6 and 4.1 ft) tall at the shoulder and typically weighs between 220 to 460 lb (100 to 209 kg).

== Distribution and habitat ==
Historically, the Arabian oryx probably ranged throughout most of the Middle East. In the early 1800s, it still occurred in the Sinai Peninsula, Palestine region, the Transjordan, much of Iraq, and most of the Arabian Peninsula. During the 19th and early 20th centuries, its range decreased to Saudi Arabia, and by 1914, only a few survived outside that country. A few were reported in Jordan in the 1930s, but by the mid-1930s, the only remaining population was in the Nafud Desert in northwestern Saudi Arabia and the Rub' al Khali in the south. The Arabian oryx prefers gravel desert or hard sand, where its speed and endurance protects it from most predators and hunters on foot. In the sand deserts of Saudi Arabia, it used to be present in the hard sand areas of the flats between the softer dunes and ridges.

In the 1930s, Arabian princes and oil company clerks started hunting Arabian oryxes with automobiles and rifles. Hunts grew in size, and some were reported to employ as many as 300 vehicles. By the middle of the 20th century, the northern population was effectively extinct. The last Arabian oryx in the wild before reintroduction was reported in 1972.

The Arabian oryx has been reintroduced to Oman, Saudi Arabia, the United Arab Emirates, Syria and Jordan. A small population was introduced on Hawar Island, Bahrain, and large semi-managed populations at several sites in Qatar and the UAE. The total reintroduced population is now estimated to be around 1,000 individuals. This puts the Arabian oryx well over the threshold of 250 mature individuals needed to qualify for endangered status. However, the majority of the population is concentrated in Saudi Arabia.

== Behaviour and ecology ==
The Arabian oryx rests during the heat of the day. A herd in Oman can range over 3,000 km^{2} (1,200 sq mi). Packs are of mixed sex and usually comprise between 2 and 15 individuals, though herds of up to 100 have been reported. Arabian oryxes are generally not aggressive toward one another, which allows herds to exist peacefully for some time.

=== Feeding ===
The diets of the Arabian oryx consist mainly of grasses, but it eats a large variety of vegetation, including buds, herbs, fruit, tubers and roots. Herds follow infrequent rains to eat the new plants that grow afterwards. They can go for several weeks without water. In Oman, it primarily eats grasses of the genus Stipagrostis, flowers from Stipagrostis plants appeared highest in crude protein and water, while leaves seemed a better food source with other vegetation.

=== Behavior ===
When the Arabian oryx is not wandering its habitat or eating, it digs shallow depressions in the soft ground under shrubs or trees for resting. They can detect rainfall from a distance and follow in the direction of fresh plant growth. The number of individuals in a herd can vary greatly (up to 100 have been reported occasionally), but the average is 10 or fewer individuals. Bachelor herds do not occur, and single territorial males are rare. Herds establish a straightforward hierarchy that involves all females and males above the age of about seven months. Arabian oryxes tend to maintain visual contact with other herd members, with subordinate males taking positions between the main body of the herd and the outlying females. If separated, males will search areas where the herd last visited, settling into a solitary existence until the herd's return. Where water and grazing conditions permit, male Arabian oryxes establish territories. Bachelor males are solitary. A dominance hierarchy is created within the herd by posturing displays, which avoid the danger of serious injury their long, sharp horns could potentially inflict. Males and females use their horns to defend the sparse territorial resources against interlopers.

=== Adaptations for desert environments ===
The Arabian oryx changes its physiology and behaviour at different times of the year to increase survival during times when food and water are in limited supply. During the summer, when droughts are common in the desert environments where it lives, the Arabian oryx will drastically reduce its minimal fasting metabolic rate by lying completely inactive beneath shade trees during the day and ranging over smaller areas at night to forage. By letting its body temperature rise during the heat of the day, it uses less evaporative cooling and retains more body water, and at night, the cool night air lowers its temperature back to the normal range. The oryx's arterial blood temperature is partly powered by a network of small arterial vessels with a large surface area called the rete mirabile, which branches from the two carotid arteries to the brain and allows for heat exchange between warm arterial blood and the cooler blood in the sinus cavities. Because of these changes in behaviour and physiology, it was shown that Arabian oryx can reduce their urine volume, faecal water loss, and resting metabolic rate by at least 50%.

The Arabian wolf is the Arabian oryx's only predator. In captivity and safe conditions in the wild, it has a maximum life span of up to 20 years. In periods of drought, though, their life expectancy may be significantly reduced by malnutrition and dehydration. Other causes of death include fights between males, snakebites, disease, and drowning during floods.

== Importance to humans ==
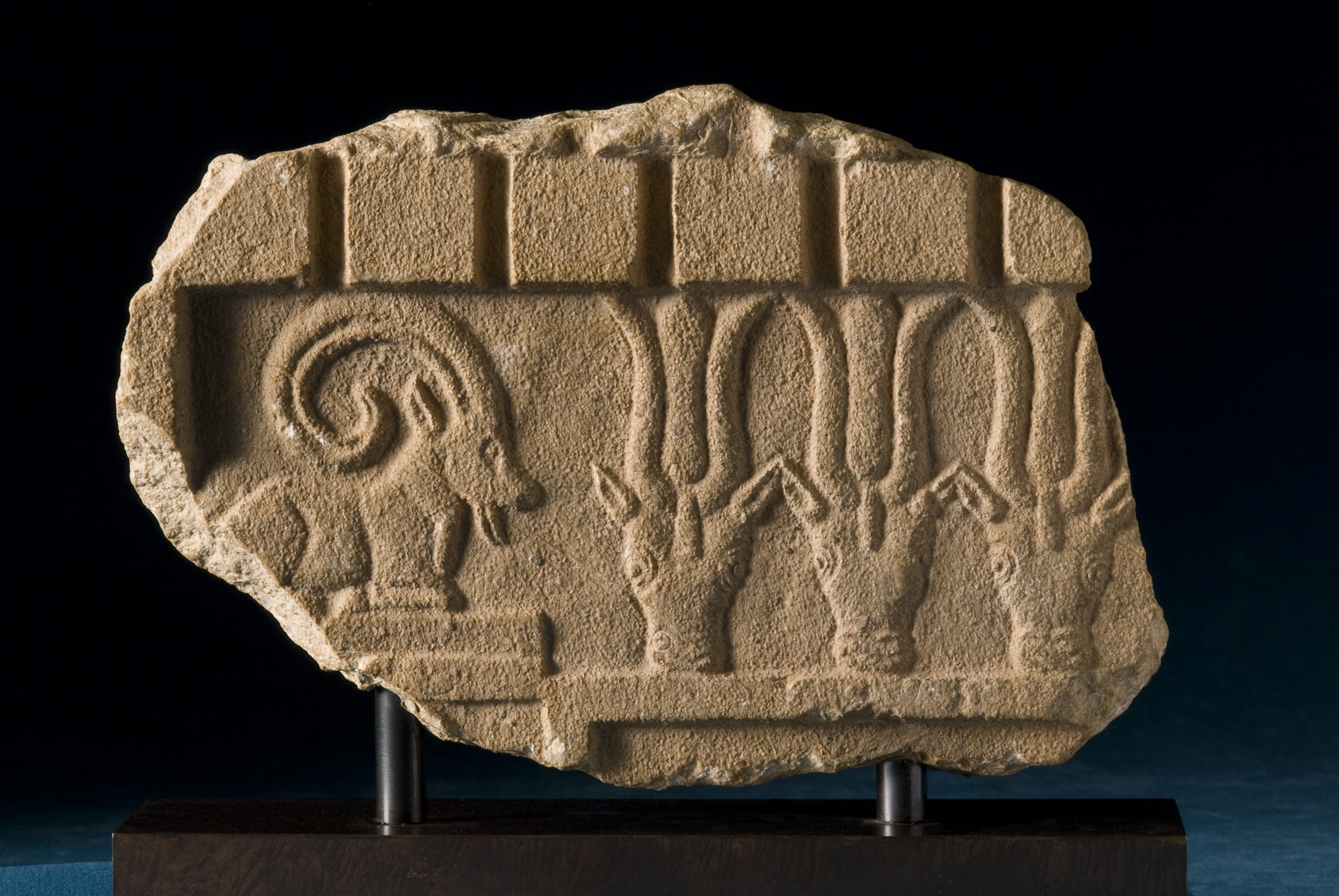
South Arabian fragment of a stela, depicts a reclining ibex and three Arabian oryx heads. The ibex was one of the most sacred animals in South Arabia, while the oryx antelope was associated with the god Attar, 5th century BC.

The Arabian oryx is the national animal of Jordan, Oman, the United Arab Emirates, Bahrain, and Qatar.

The Arabian oryx is also the namesake of several businesses on the Arabian peninsula, notably Al Maha Airways and Al Maha Petroleum.

In the King James Version of the Bible, the word re'em is translated as 'unicorn'. In Modern Hebrew, the name re'em lavan, meaning white oryx, is used in error for the scimitar-horned oryxes living in the sanctuary Yotvata Hai Bar near Eilat. The scimitar oryx is called re'em Sahara. The Arabian name ri'ïm is the equivalent of the Hebrew name re'em, also meaning white oryx, suggesting a borrowing from the Early Modern Era.

A Qatari oryx named "Orry" was chosen as the official games mascot for the 2006 Asian Games in Doha, and is shown on tailfins of planes belonging to Middle Eastern airline Qatar Airways.

=== Unicorn myth ===
The myth of the one-horned unicorn may be based on oryxes that have lost one horn. Aristotle and Pliny the Elder held that the oryx was the unicorn's "prototype". From certain angles, the oryx may seem to have one horn rather than two, and given that its horns are made from hollow bone that cannot be regrown, if an Arabian oryx were to lose one of its horns, for the rest of its life, it would have only one.

Another source for the concept may have originated from the translation of the Hebrew word re'em into Greek as μονόκερως, monokeros, in the Septuagint. In Psalm 22:21, the word karen, meaning horn, is written in singular. The Roman Catholic Vulgata and the Douay-Rheims Bible translated re'em as rhinoceros; other translations are names for a wild bull, wild oxen, buffalo, or gaur, but in some languages, a word for unicorn is maintained. The Arabic translation alrim is the correct choice etymologically, meaning 'white oryx'.

== Conservation ==
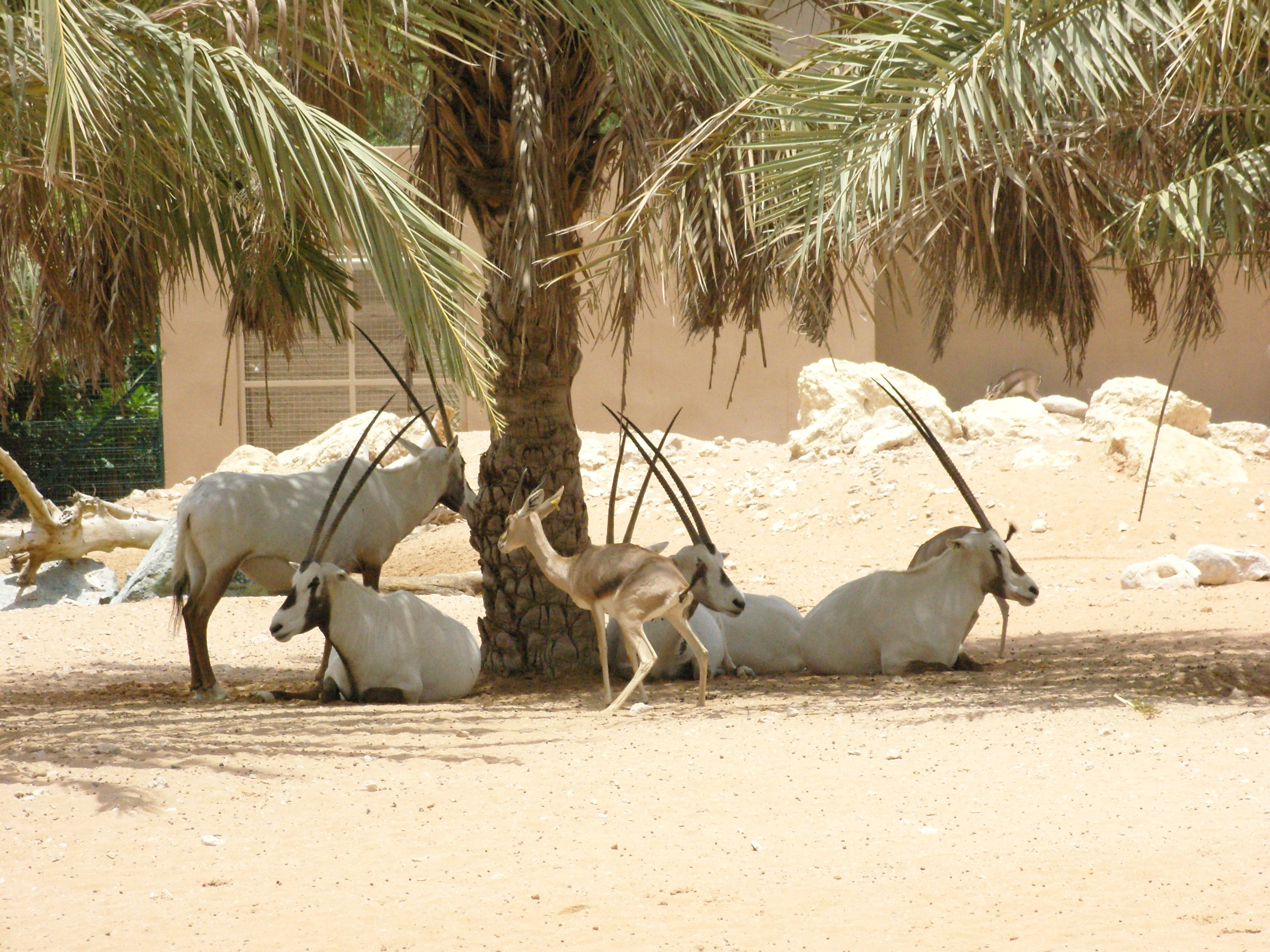
Arabian oryx in Al Ain Zoo

The Arabian oryx is listed in CITES Appendix I. The Phoenix Zoo and the Fauna and Flora Preservation Society of London (now Fauna and Flora International), with financial help from the World Wildlife Fund, are credited with saving the Arabian oryx from extinction. In 1962, these groups started the first captive-breeding herd in any zoo, at the Phoenix Zoo, sometimes referred to as "Operation Oryx". Starting with nine animals, the Phoenix Zoo has had over 240 successful births. From Phoenix, Arabian oryxes were sent to other zoos and parks to start new herds.

In 1968, Sheikh Zayed bin Sultan Al Nahyan of Abu Dhabi, out of concern for the wildlife of the United Arab Emirates, particularly ungulates such as the Arabian oryx, founded the Al Ain Zoo to conserve them.

Arabian oryxes were hunted to extinction in the wild by 1972. By 1980, the number of Arabian oryxes in captivity had increased to the point that Arabian oryx reintroduction was started. The first release, to Oman, was attempted with Arabian oryxes from the San Diego Wild Animal Park. Although numbers in Oman have declined, there are now wild populations in Saudi Arabia and Israel. In June 2007, Oman's Arabian Oryx Sanctuary was the first site ever to be removed from the UNESCO World Heritage List. UNESCO's reason for this was the Omani government's decision to open 90% of the site to oil prospecting. The Arabian oryx population on the site has been reduced from 450 in 1996 to only 65 in 2007. At that time, there were fewer than four breeding pairs left on the site.

In Saudi Arabia, one of the largest populations live in Mahazat as-Sayd Protected Area, a large, fenced protected area of more than 2,000 km^{2} (770 sq mi). 'Uruq Bani Ma'arid Protected Area harbours 116 Arabian oryxes as of 2024, up from 81 individuals in 2020.

In June 2011, the Arabian oryx was relisted as vulnerable on the IUCN Red List; as of 2016, the wild population was estimated at more than 1,200 individuals, and 6,000–7,000 individuals held in zoos, preserves, and private collections. Some of these are in large, fenced enclosures, including those in Syria, Bahrain, Qatar, and the UAE.
