= 'Uruq Bani Ma'arid =

Protected area in Saudi Arabia

UNESCO World Heritage Site
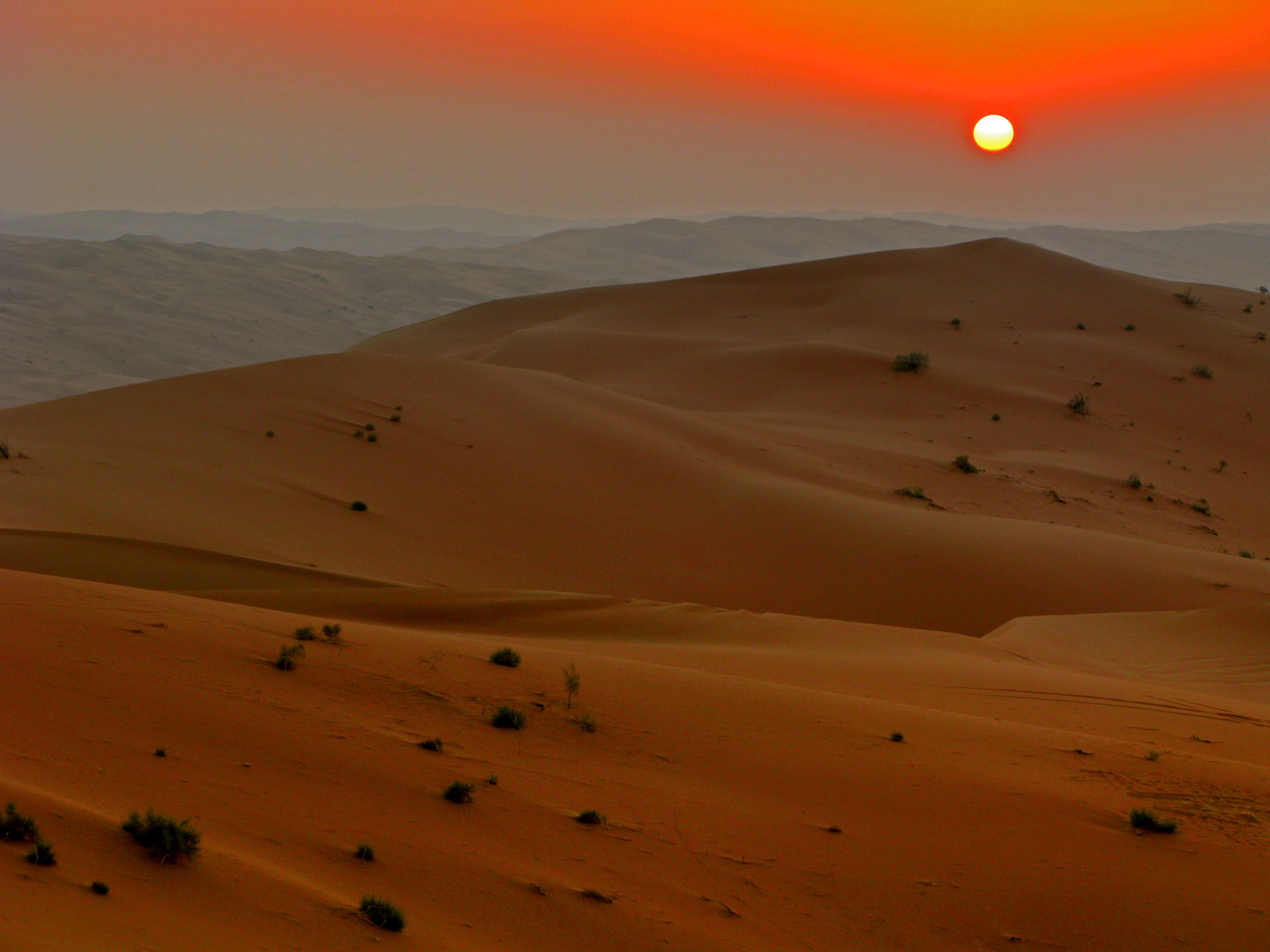

- Location within Saudi Arabia Location within West and Central Asia
- Location: Rub' al Khali, Saudi Arabia
- Criteria: Natural: (vii), (ix)
- Reference: 1699
- Inscription: 2023 (45th Session)
- Area: 1,276,500 ha (3,154,000 acres)
- Buffer zone: 80,600 ha (199,000 acres)
- Coordinates: 19°21′50″N 45°35′54″E

'Uruq Bani Ma'arid (Arabic: عروق بني معارض) is a protected area in southern Saudi Arabia, located on the western edge of the Rub' al Khali (Empty Quarter), the largest sandy desert in the world. The protected area is divided into three sections; a core nature reserve; a zone where controlled grazing is permitted; and a hunting zone.

'Uruq Bani Ma'arid is in an area in which the Arabian oryx used to live before it became extinct in the wild. The reserve has been chosen for the reintroduction of oryx that have been bred in a captive breeding programme. It has also been selected as being suitable for the re-establishment of herds of Arabian sand gazelle (Gazella subgutturosa marica), mountain gazelle (Gazella gazella) and ostrich (Struthio camelus), all of which have historically inhabited the area.

== Geography ==
The site of this protected area extends from a latitude of 19°30'N and longitude of 45°30'E, to a latitude of 19° 10'N and longitude of 45° 15'E, with a total area of 12,658 km^{2} (4,887 mi^{2}). As well as the dissected limestone plateau underlying the linear dunes, the reserve includes part of the Tuwaiq Escarpment, wadis and gravel plains. The ergs of red sand lie parallel to each other and may be as much as 150 m (492 ft) high. They are separated by corridors with sandy or gravelly bases. The climate is hot and arid. Rainfall is very infrequent and averages about 30 mm (1.2 in) per year. Downpours on the escarpment cause the wadis to flow and water drains into the substrate where it is retained.

== Flora and fauna ==
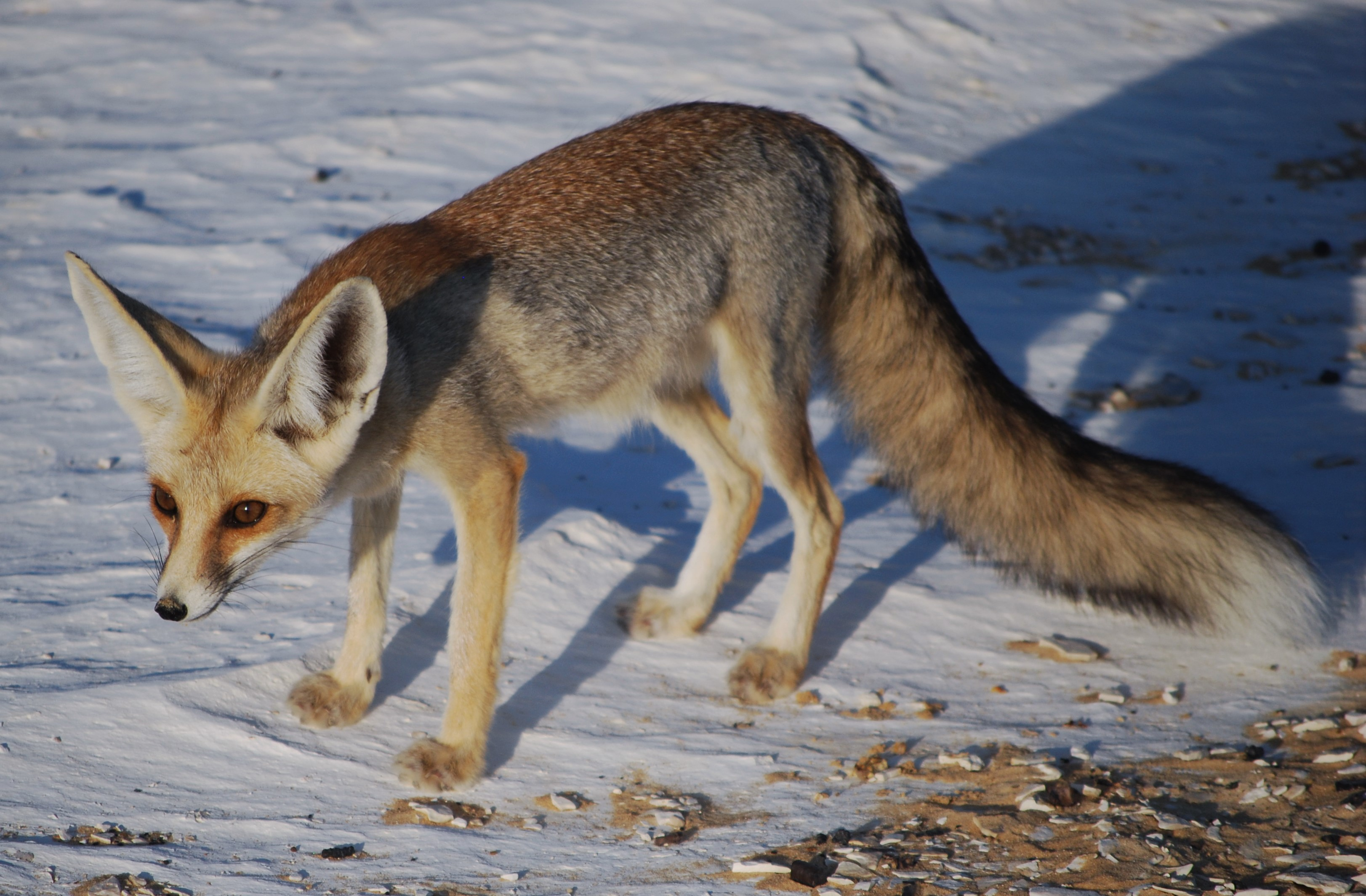
Rüppell's fox is among the desert animals found in the 'Uruq Bani Ma'arid.

'Uruq Bani Ma'arid has been designated an Important Plant Area because of the richness of its plant life as compared to other parts of the Empty Quarter, and the presence of many plant species endemic to the Arabian Peninsula. The limestone escarpment has little vegetation but the wadis crease the sides of the escarpment and support a variety of shrubby growth including Acacias, grasses and perennial legumes. Some scanty vegetation grows on the dunes, particularly Calligonum crinitum ssp. arabicum together with sedges and perennial grasses. In the corridors between the dunes grow dwarf Haloxylon persicum, Moringa peregrina and Commiphora myrrha. Few annual plants grow here, but after rain has fallen there is growth of new shoots on the perennial plants. 106 species of plant have been recorded in the reserve.

Between 1995 and 2013, some 149 Arabian oryx had been released into the reserve, and it was estimated in 2013 that about 500 individuals were present. The reserve is unfenced, so this is currently the only population in the wild. Arabian sand gazelle and mountain gazelle have also been successfully reintroduced since 1995.

Other animals that may be seen in the reserve include the Rüppell's fox, sand cat, red fox, Cape hare, desert hedgehog, Cheesman's gerbil, lesser Egyptian jerboa, desert monitor, other lizards and snakes, and feral dogs. 104 species of bird have been recorded in the reserve but there are only about 16 resident species. Houbara bustard are sometimes seen here, possibly on migration, but the lappet-faced vulture and short-toed snake eagle breed here.

== Inscription on UNESCO World Heritage List ==
On 20 September 2023, the Kingdom of Saudi Arabia successfully inscribed the 'Uruq Bani Ma'arid Protected Area on the UNESCO World Heritage List as the first-ever Natural World Heritage site in Saudi Arabia.
