= Ras Dibba =

Ras Diba
- Location within United Arab Emirates
- Coordinates: 25°35′40″N 56°21′15″E
- Country: United Arab Emirates
- Emirate: Fujairah
- Elevation: 530 m (1,740 ft)

Ras Diba is the name of a cape in Fujairah.
