= List of dams in Saudi Arabia =

As of 2023, there are 559 dams in Saudi Arabia across all provinces, with a total storage capacity of 2.6 billion cubic meters. These structures are used for flood control, groundwater recharge, and providing water for agricultural and municipal purposes. They are owned and managed by the Ministry of Environment, Water and Agriculture, which plans to build 1,000 more to further enhance water security.

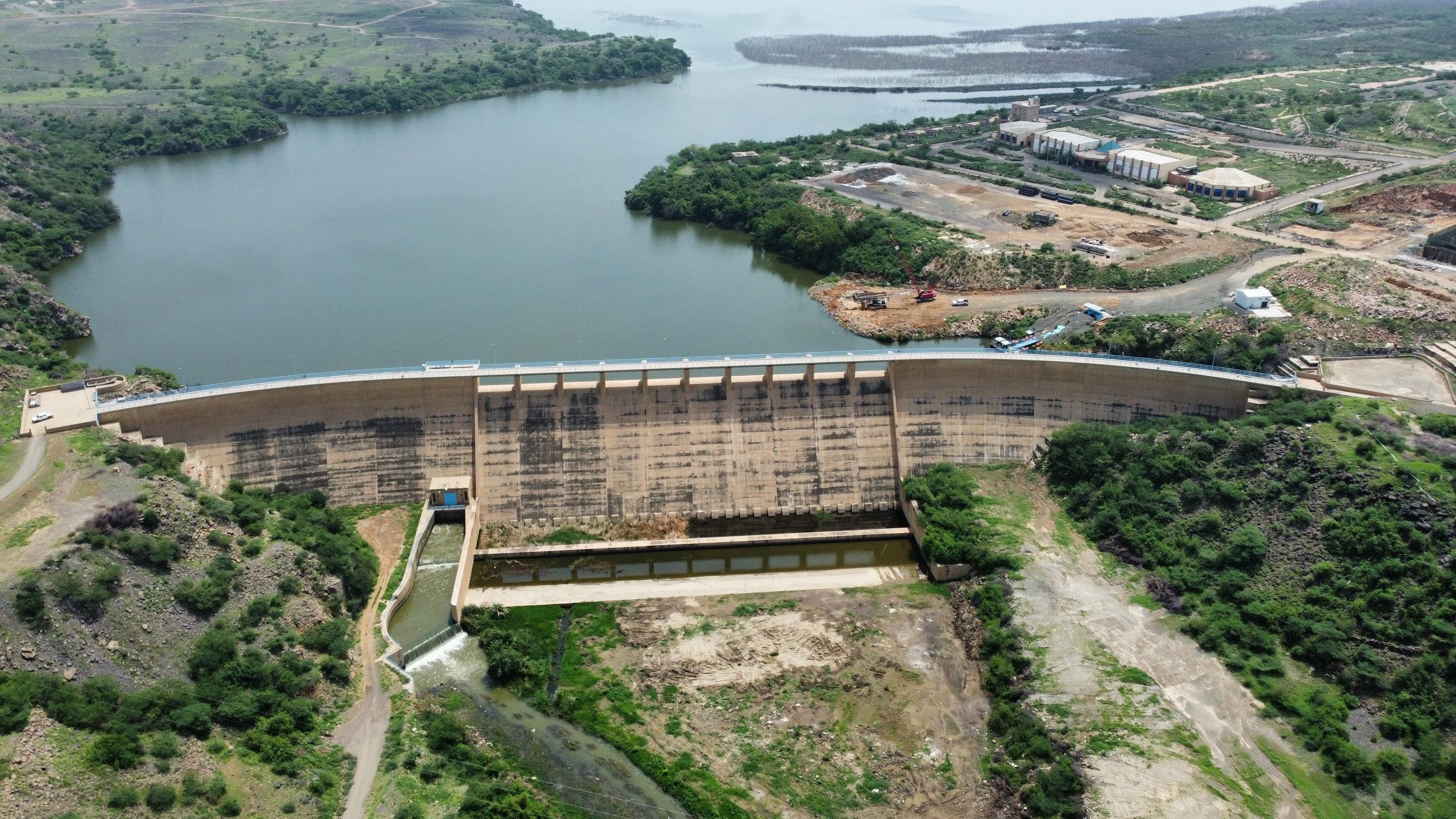
Baysh Dam in Jazan Province

== Riyadh Province ==
- Al-Alab Dam
- Haeer Dam
- Hanabej Dam
- Hareeq Dam
- Helwah Dam
- Lasad Dam

== Mecca Province ==
- Murwani Dam
- Hali Dam
- Al-Lith Dam
- Rabigh Dam
- Fatimah Dam
- Arda Dam
- Tarba Dam
- Laya Dam
- Murayfeg Dam
- Nawfla Dam
- Qrn Dam

== Medina Province ==
- Qaa hathutha Dam
- Fareah Dam
- Alakool Dam
- Malal Dam
- Muawiya Dam

== Asir Province ==
- King Fahd Dam
- Aayash Dam
- Al-Hifah Dam
- Al-Mahzamah Dam
- Araer Dam
- Asem Dam
- Ashran Dam
- Baniqayis Dam
- Bdwah Dam
- Farwan Dam
- Ghraba Dam
- Hatheam Dam
- Ittwid Dam
- Motha Dam
- Radah Dam

== Jazan Province ==
- Baysh Dam
- Jizan Dam

== Najran Province ==
- Najran Valley Dam
- Al-Madiq Dam

== Al-Baha Province ==
- Al-Habees Dam
- Matwah Dam
- Dbdb Dam
- Al-Ureisheen Dam
- Zaqat Dam
- Al-Qim Dam
- Zarwah Dam
- Al-Malah Dam
- Al-Marba Dam
- Al-Kharrar Dam
- Al-Talqiyah Dam
- Subayhah Dam
- Al-Mazlumat Dam
- Al-Sadr Dam
- Madhas Dam
- Beedah Dam
- Assadir Dam
- Beda Dam
- Dhuaian Dam
- Marbaa Dam
- Marzoq Dam
- Maslah Dam

== Al-Jouf Province ==
- Al-Mareer Dam
- Al-Shuwayhitiyah Dam
- Husaidah Dam
- Zallum Dam
- Madisis Dam
- Athfa Dam
- Khawaa Dam
- Yasir Dam
- Qulaib Khadr Dam
- Al-Safa Dam
- Al-Radeefah Dam

== Hail Province ==
- Sitae Alhven Dam

== Northern Province ==
- Arar Dam
- Badanah Dam

== See also ==
- Saudi Water Authority
- List of wadis of Saudi Arabia
- Water supply and sanitation in Saudi Arabia
- Ministry of Environment, Water and Agriculture
