= Helwah Dam =

Dam in Riyadh Province, Saudi Arabia

Helwah dam
- Location within Saudi Arabia
- Country: Saudi Arabia
- Location: Riyadh Province
- Coordinates: 24°37′55.089″N 46°42′54.233″E
- Purpose: Multiple
- Opening date: 2002; 24 years ago
- Owner: Ministry of Environment, Water and Agriculture

Helwah Dam (Arabic: سد حلوة) is a dam in Saudi Arabia opened in 2002 and located in Riyadh Province.

== See also ==
- Saudi Water Authority
- List of dams in Saudi Arabia
- List of wadis of Saudi Arabia
- Water supply and sanitation in Saudi Arabia
- Ministry of Environment, Water and Agriculture
