= Hali Dam =

Dam in Mecca Province, Saudi Arabia

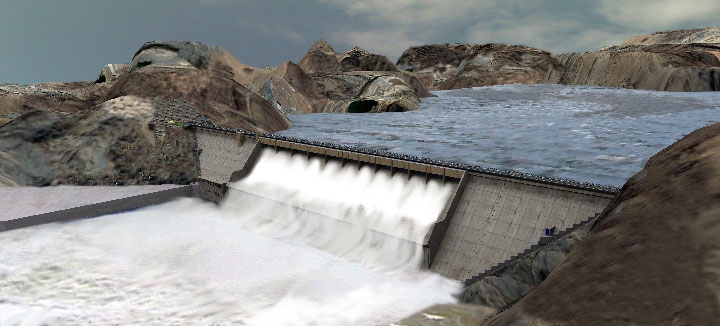

- Location within Saudi Arabia
- Country: Saudi Arabia
- Location: Keyad, Mecca Province
- Coordinates: 18°46′4.30″N 41°34′28.29″E
- Purpose: Flood control, irrigation, municipal water, groundwater recharge
- Construction began: 2003; 23 years ago
- Opening date: 2009; 17 years ago
- Owner: Ministry of Environment, Water and Agriculture

Dam and spillways
- Type of dam: Gravity
- Impounds: Wadi Hali
- Height (foundation): 95 m (312 ft)
- Height (thalweg): 57 m (187 ft)
- Length: 384 m (1,260 ft)
- Width (crest): 8 m (26 ft)
- Width (base): 71 m (233 ft)
- Dam volume: 690,000 m^{3} (900,000 cu yd)
- Spillway type: Overflow, 12 openings
- Spillway capacity: 7,856 m^{3}/s (277,400 cu ft/s)

Reservoir
- Total capacity: 249,860,000 m^{3} (202,560 acre⋅ft)
- Catchment area: 4,843 km^{2} (1,870 mi^{2})
- Surface area: 15 km^{2} (5.8 mi^{2})

The Hali Dam (Arabic سد حلي) is a gravity dam on Wadi Hali, about 14 km (8.7 mi) east of Keyad in Mecca Province of southwestern Saudi Arabia. It serves multiple purposes, including flood control, irrigation, municipal water supply, and groundwater recharge, and has a reservoir capacity of 249,860,000 m^{3} (202,560 acre⋅ft), making it the second largest in the country after the King Fahd Dam; it was constructed between 2003 and 2009 and is operated by the Ministry of Environment, Water and Agriculture.

== See also ==
- List of dams in Saudi Arabia
- List of wadis of Saudi Arabia
