= Al-Alab Dam =

Dam in Riyadh Province, Saudi Arabia

Al-Alab dam
- Location within Saudi Arabia
- Country: Saudi Arabia
- Location: Diriyah, Riyadh Province
- Coordinates: 24°37′55.089″N 46°42′54.233″E
- Purpose: Flood control
- Opening date: 1974; 52 years ago
- Owner: Ministry of Environment, Water and Agriculture

Al-Alab Dam (Arabic: سد العلب) is a dam in Saudi Arabia opened in 1974 and located in Riyadh Province. The main purpose of the dam is flood control.

== See also ==
- Saudi Water Authority
- List of dams in Saudi Arabia
- List of wadis of Saudi Arabia
- Water supply and sanitation in Saudi Arabia
- Ministry of Environment, Water and Agriculture
