= Hareeq Dam =

Dam in Riyadh Province, Saudi Arabia

Hareeq dam
- Location within Saudi Arabia
- Country: Saudi Arabia
- Location: Al-Hariq Governorate, Riyadh Province
- Coordinates: 24°37′55.089″N 46°42′54.233″E
- Purpose: flood control
- Opening date: 1984; 42 years ago
- Owner: Ministry of Environment, Water and Agriculture

Hareeq Dam (Arabic: سد الحريق) is a dam in Saudi Arabia opened in 1984 and located in Al-Hariq Governorate.

== See also ==
- Saudi Water Authority
- List of dams in Saudi Arabia
- List of wadis of Saudi Arabia
- Water supply and sanitation in Saudi Arabia
- Ministry of Environment, Water and Agriculture
