= Hanabej Dam =

Dam in Riyadh Province, Saudi Arabia

Hanabej dam
- Location within Saudi Arabia
- Country: Saudi Arabia
- Location: Riyadh Province
- Coordinates: 24°37′55.089″N 46°42′54.233″E
- Purpose: Multiple
- Opening date: 1979; 47 years ago
- Owner: Ministry of Environment, Water and Agriculture

Hanabej Dam (Arabic: سد حنابج) is a dam in Saudi Arabia opened in 1979 and located in Riyadh Province.

== See also ==
- Saudi Water Authority
- List of dams in Saudi Arabia
- List of wadis of Saudi Arabia
- Water supply and sanitation in Saudi Arabia
- Ministry of Environment, Water and Agriculture
