= Murwani Dam =

Dam in Mecca Province, Saudi Arabia

- Location within Saudi Arabia
- Location: Mecca Province, Saudi Arabia
- Coordinates: 22.179477°N 39.568709°E
- Purpose: Flood control
- Status: Operational
- Construction began: 2004
- Opening date: 2010
- Owner: Ministry of Environment, Water and Agriculture

Dam and spillways
- Type of dam: Rock-fill embankment dam
- Impounds: Wadi Murwani
- Height (foundation): 102 m (335 ft)
- Length: 1,012 m (3,320 ft)
- Elevation at crest: 251 m (823 ft)
- Dam volume: 6,000,000 m^{3} (210,000,000 cu ft)
- Spillway type: Over the dam

Reservoir
- Total capacity: 150,000,000 m^{3} (120,000 acre⋅ft)

Murwani Dam (Arabic: سد مرواني) is a rock-fill embankment dam on Wadi Murwani in Mecca Province, Saudi Arabia, approximately 100 km northeast of Jeddah.

== Overview ==
The 263 mio. SR contract to build the dam was awarded to Yuksel Insaat Saudia Co Ltd., a subsidiary of the Turkish company Yüksel Holding AŞ. Work on the dam began in 2004. The dam was completed in April 2010.

Main purpose of the dam is flood control, because of flash floods, which occur occasionally in the region (see also 2009 Jeddah floods).

== Dam ==
Murwani Dam is a 102 (91 or 101) m tall (height above foundation) and 1,012 m long rock-fill embankment dam with a crest altitude of 251 m. The volume of the dam is 6,000,000 m³. The main dam on the right side has a length of 575 m (height 102 m), the saddle dam on the left of 437 m (height 30 m). The dam features a spillway, which is located between the two dams. Impermeability was achieved by using an asphalt-core, for which 80,000 tons of asphalt were used.

== Reservoir ==
At full reservoir level the reservoir of the dam has a total capacity of 150 mio. m³. The estimated annual contribution into the reservoir is 31 mio. m³; about half of this water will be used at a downstream drinking water treatment plant for potable use. The remaining water will be stored in an aquifer or will be lost to free-surface evaporation.

== See also ==
- List of dams in Saudi Arabia
- List of wadis of Saudi Arabia
