= Waleed A. Elkhereiji =

Saudi politician (born 1958)

- وليد بن عبدالكريم الخريجي
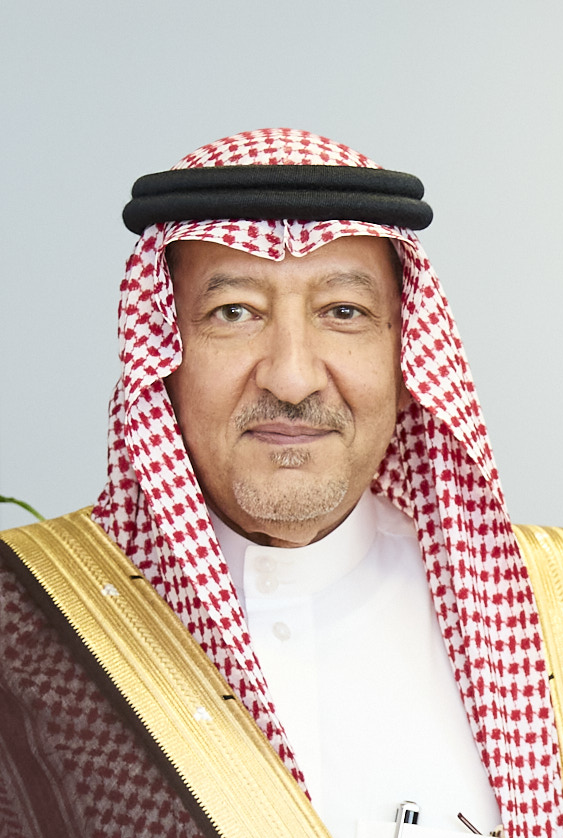
- Elkhereiji in 2026

Deputy Minister of Foreign Affairs
- Incumbent
- Assumed office 15 July 2020
- Monarch: Salman
- Prime Minister: Mohammed bin Salman

Saudi Ambassador to Turkey
- In office 17 April 2017 – 15 July 2020
- Monarch: Salman
- Prime Minister: Muhammad bin Nayef; Mohammed bin Salman
- Preceded by: Adel bin Siraj Mirdad
- Succeeded by: Fahad bin Asaad Abu Al-Nasr

Minister of Agriculture
- In office 8 December 2014 – 29 Jan. 2015
- Monarchs: Abdullah; Salman
- Prime Minister: Muhammad bin Nayef
- Preceded by: Fahd bin Abdul Rahman Balghunaim
- Succeeded by: Abdulrahman Al-Fadhli

Personal details
- Born: Waleed Abdulkarim El Khereiji; 14 September 1958 (age 68) Medina, Saudi Arabia

Waleed Abdulkarim El Khereiji or Waleed A. Elkhereiji (Arabic: وليد بن عبدالكريم الخريجي; born 14 September 1958) is the Deputy Minister of Foreign Affairs in Saudi Arabia since 15 July 2020.

== Career ==
- From 8 December 2014 to 29 January 2015 he was agriculture minister.
- On 14 February 2015, Salman bin Abdulaziz Al Saud appointed him a member of the Shura.
- From 17 April 2017 to July 2020 he was the Saudi Ambassador to Turkey.
