= Muawiya Dam =

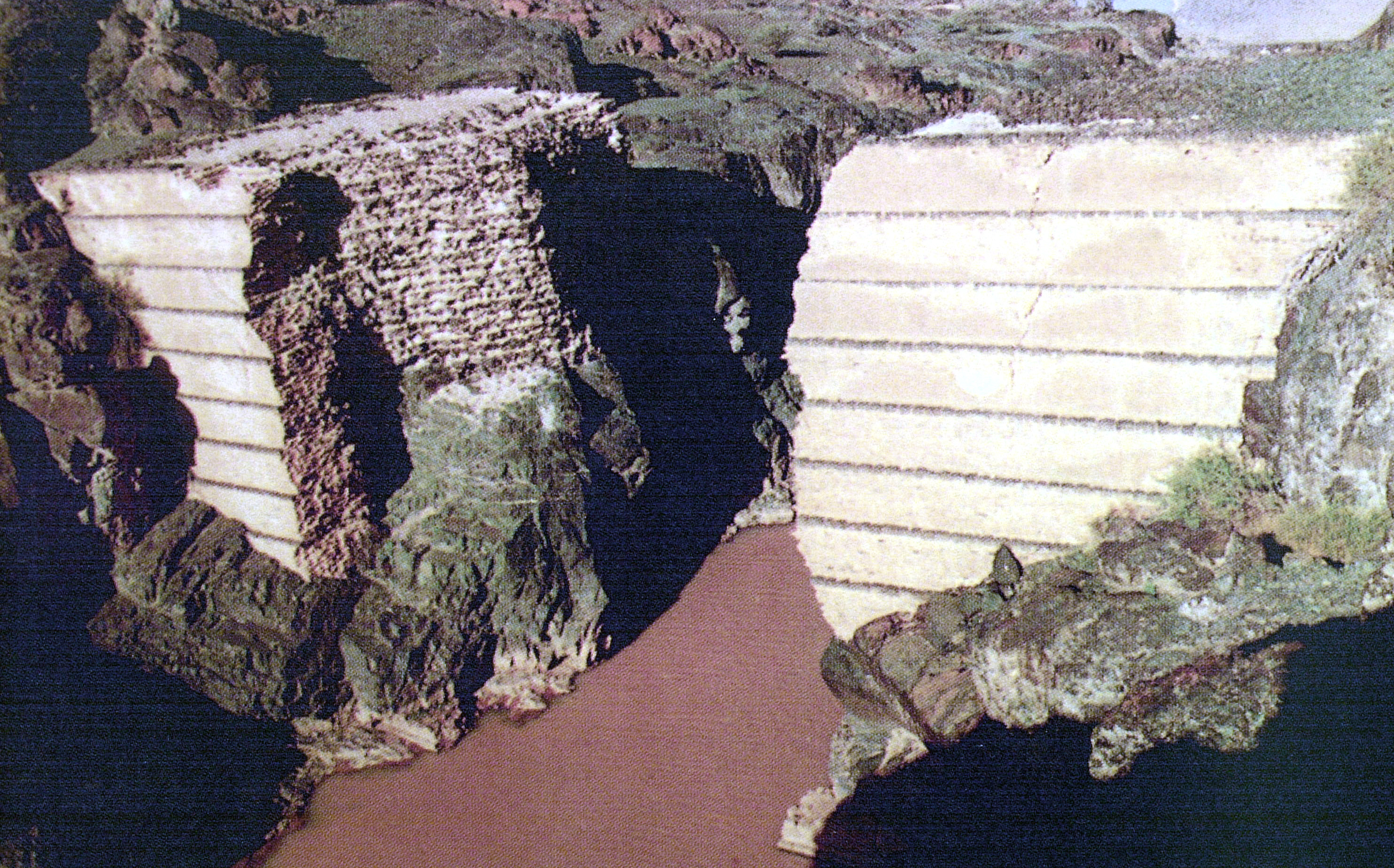

- Location within Saudi Arabia
- Country: Saudi Arabia
- Location: Medina
- Coordinates: 24°26′33″N 39°55′06″E
- Owner: Ministry of Environment, Water and Agriculture (Saudi Arabia)

Muawiya Dam (Arabic: سد معاوية) is a water dam located in Wadi al-Khanq, east of Medina in Saudi Arabia.

== Geography ==
It lies in a narrow passage between two mountains near the village of Al-ʽUqul, about 15 kilometers from Medina.

== History ==
- It was built around the year 50 AH during the reign of Caliph Mu'awiya I.
- Inscriptions on the dam indicate its date of construction and the names of those who participated in building it.

== Engineering Dimensions ==
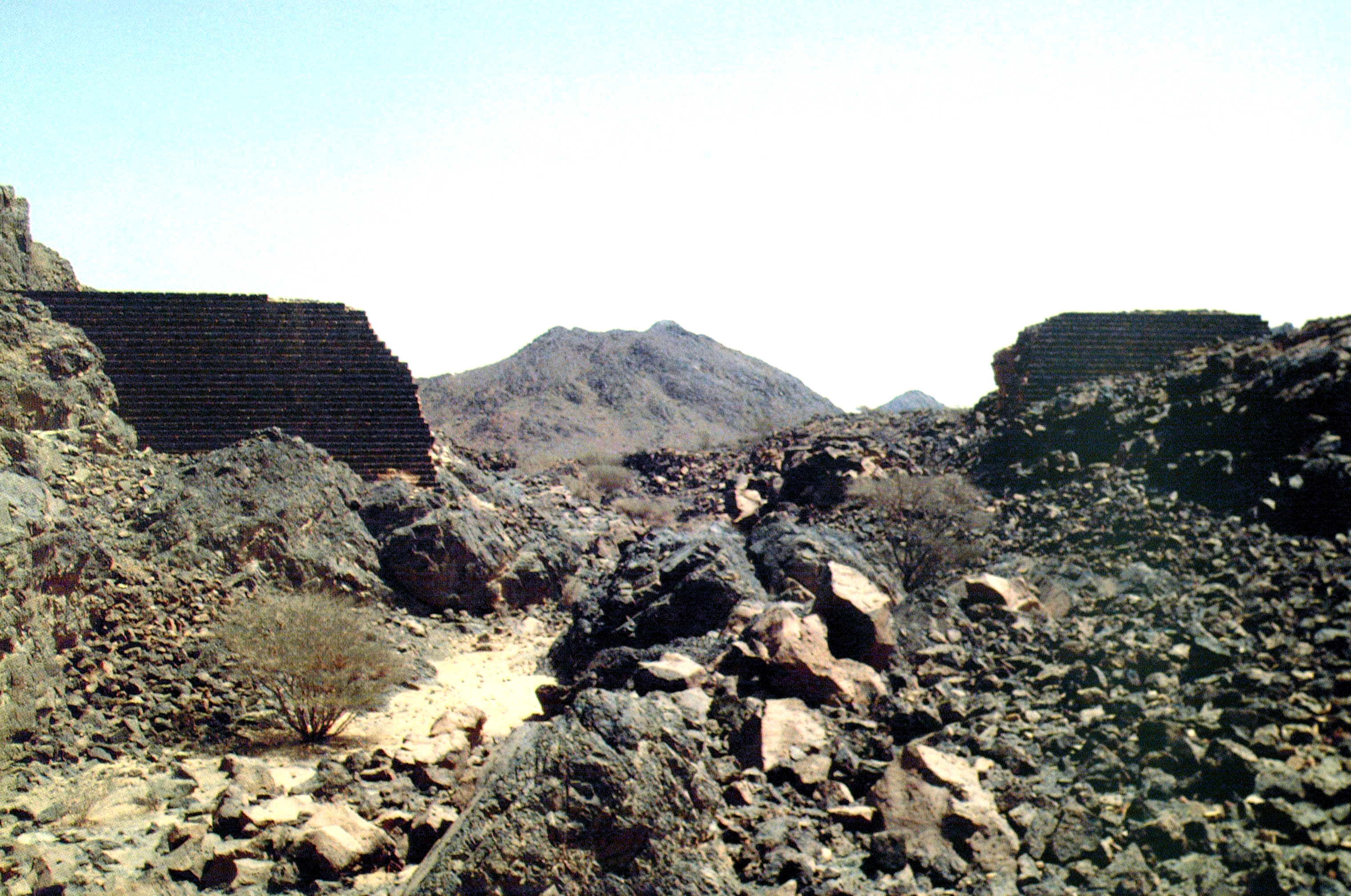
- Muawiyah Dam in Medina, in the valley of Al-Khanq
  Its original length is about 30 meters.
- Its height from the valley floor to the surrounding ground level is about 20 meters.
- The width of the dam wall at the base is estimated at 10 meters.
- Terracing appears in the dam's construction, which helps strengthen its base due to its height.

== Significance ==
- It is considered a testament to Islamic civilization in hydraulic engineering and agriculture at the time.
- The dam is part of an ancient network of dams that protect the city from valley floods.

== See also ==
- List of dams in Saudi Arabia
- Mu'awiya I
- Medina
- Al-ʽUqul
