= International Conference on Water Sustainability =

International Conference on Water Sustainability مؤتمر الابتكار في استدامة المياه
- Genre: Maritime, Logistics & Supply Chain
- Frequency: Annual
- Venue: Jeddah, Saudi Arabia
- Country: Saudi Arabia
- Inaugurated: 2022
- Next event: 7 – 9 December 2026
- Attendance: 6,200+ (2025)
- Organiser: Saudi Water Authority, Tahaluf
- Website: idwsc.com

The International Conference on Water Sustainability (IDWS) is an annual international conference and exhibition focused on water innovation, sustainability, desalination technologies, water security, water reuse, infrastructure development, and environmental solutions. The event is held in Jeddah and is organized by the Saudi Water Authority.

== History ==
The International Conference on Water Sustainability was established in 2022 by the Saudi Water Authority to promote innovation in the global water sector and facilitate collaboration among public and private sector stakeholders.

The third edition was held from November 25 to 27, 2024, in Jeddah, under the patronage of the Minister of Environment, Water, and Agriculture, Abdulrahman bin Abdulmohsen Al-Fadley.

The 2024 edition of the conference hosted the Global Prize for Innovation in Desalination (GPID), an international competition established by the Saudi Water Authority. The GPID was received by a team from Nanyang Technological University for developing a membrane-based desalination technology designed to improve water-treatment efficiency and reduce energy consumption.

The fourth edition of IDWS was held from 8 to 10 December 2025 in Jeddah under the patronage of Prince Saud bin Abdullah bin Jalawi, Governor of Jeddah. During the event, the Global Prize for Innovation in Water (GPIW) was awarded to researchers and innovators for projects focused on improving the efficiency and sustainability of water production and treatment technologies.

During the event, the Rabigh Water Oasis (SWA Rabigh Water Oasis) was officially announced as an integrated research and innovation ecosystem. The Rabigh Water Oasis received a Guinness World Record after being certified as the world's largest water innovation oasis, with an area of 33,395.88 square meters.

The conference hosted Miyahthon, a water-focused innovation competition that brought together entrepreneurs, researchers, students, and innovators to develop solutions for water-related challenges.

The fifth edition of IDWS is scheduled to take place in Jeddah from 7 to 9 December 2026 at The Ritz-Carlton in Jeddah.
