= Qaa Hathutha Dam =

Qaa hathutha dam
- Location within Saudi Arabia
- Country: Saudi Arabia
- Location: Madinah
- Coordinates: 24°28′16.151″N 39°36′40.037″E
- Purpose: Other
- Opening date: 2001; 25 years ago
- Owner: Ministry of Environment, Water and Agriculture (Saudi Arabia)

The Qaa hathutha dam is a dam in Saudi Arabia opened in 2001 and located in Madinah region.

== See also ==
- List of dams in Saudi Arabia
