= Baniqayis Dam =

Baniqayis dam
- Location within Saudi Arabia
- Official name: سد بني قيس
- Country: Saudi Arabia
- Location: Asir
- Coordinates: 19°8′41″N 42°2′2″E
- Purpose: Other
- Opening date: 2005; 21 years ago
- Owner: Ministry of Environment, Water and Agriculture (Saudi Arabia)

Dam and spillways
- Type of dam: Earth fill dam
- Height (thalweg): 15
- Length: 130

Reservoir
- Total capacity: 117000 m3

The Baniqayis dam is a dam in Saudi Arabia opened in 2005 and located in Asir region.

== See also ==
- List of dams in Saudi Arabia
