= Radah Dam =

Radah dam
- Location within Saudi Arabia
- Country: Saudi Arabia
- Location: Asir
- Coordinates: 19°41′47″N 42°29′15″E
- Purpose: Other
- Opening date: 1987; 39 years ago
- Owner: Ministry of Environment, Water and Agriculture (Saudi Arabia)

The Radah dam (also known as the Aradah dam) is a dam in Saudi Arabia opened in 1987 and located in Asir region. Water supplied by rainfall is the primary source of this dam. This dam is one of 43 dams in Asir region with a total storage of 358.81 million cubic meters, 17 of which are used for drinking purposes.

== See also ==
- List of dams in Saudi Arabia
