= Marzoq Dam =

Dam in Baha, Saudi Arabia

Marzoq dam
- Location within Saudi Arabia
- Country: Saudi Arabia
- Location: Baha
- Coordinates: 20°0′0″N 41°30′0″E
- Purpose: Other
- Opening date: 1987; 39 years ago
- Owner: Ministry of Environment, Water and Agriculture (Saudi Arabia)

The Marzoq dam is a dam in Saudi Arabia opened in 1987 and located in Baha region.

== See also ==
- List of dams in Saudi Arabia
