= Al-Hifah Dam =

Al-Hifah dam
- Location within Saudi Arabia
- Interactive map of Al-Hifah dam
- Official name: سد الحفة
- Country: Saudi Arabia
- Location: Asir
- Coordinates: 19°41′47″N 42°29′15″E
- Purpose: Other
- Opening date: 1981; 45 years ago
- Owner: Ministry of Environment, Water and Agriculture (Saudi Arabia)

Dam and spillways
- Type of dam: Earth fill dam
- Elevation at crest: 20

Reservoir
- Total capacity: 500000 m3

The Al-Hifah dam is a dam in Saudi Arabia opened in 1981 and located in Asir region.

== See also ==
- List of dams in Saudi Arabia
