= Ghraba Dam =

Ghraba dam
- Location within Saudi Arabia
- Country: Saudi Arabia
- Location: Asir
- Coordinates: 19°41′47″N 42°29′15″E
- Purpose: Flood control
- Opening date: 2005; 21 years ago
- Owner: Ministry of Environment, Water and Agriculture (Saudi Arabia)

The Ghraba dam is a dam in Saudi Arabia opened in 2005 and located in Asir region. The main purpose of the dam is flood control.

== See also ==
- List of dams in Saudi Arabia
