= Assadir Dam =

Dam in Al-Baha, Saudi Arabia

Assadir dam
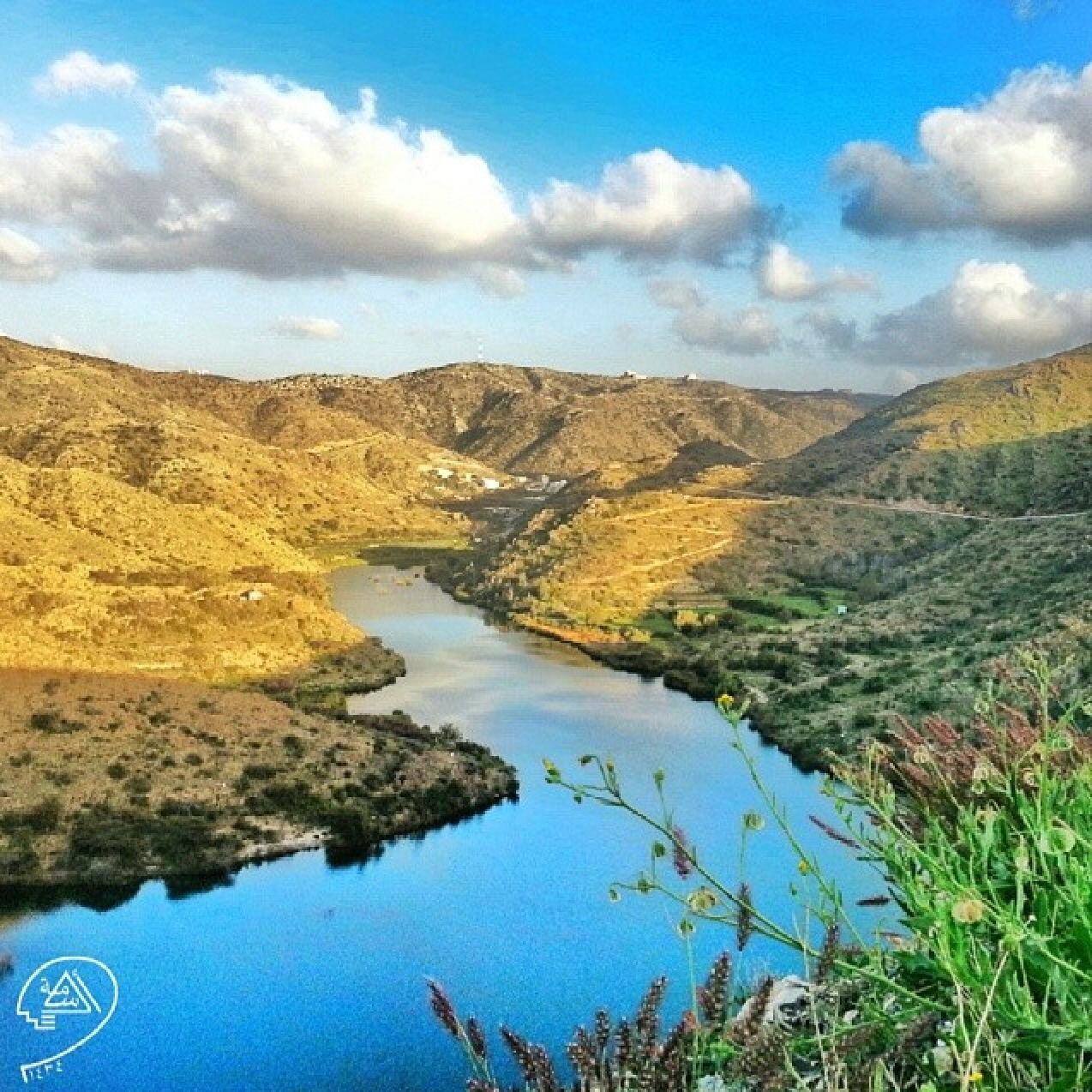
- Assadir Dam in August 2014

- Location within Saudi Arabia
- Official name: سد الصدر
- Country: Saudi Arabia
- Location: Baha
- Coordinates: 20°7′36.7″N 41°37′28.5″E
- Purpose: Irrigation
- Opening date: 1982; 44 years ago
- Owner: Ministry of Environment, Water and Agriculture (Saudi Arabia)

The Assadir dam is a dam in Saudi Arabia opened in 1982 and located in Al Baha region. The main purpose of the dam is irrigation.

== See also ==
- List of dams in Saudi Arabia
