= Marbaa Dam =

Marbaa dam
- Location within Saudi Arabia
- Country: Saudi Arabia
- Location: Baha
- Coordinates: 20°0′0″N 41°30′0″E
- Purpose: Other
- Opening date: 1984; 42 years ago
- Owner: Ministry of Environment, Water and Agriculture (Saudi Arabia)

The Marbaa dam is a dam in Saudi Arabia opened in 1984 and located in Baha region.

== See also ==
- List of dams in Saudi Arabia
