= Arda Dam =

Arda dam
- Location within Saudi Arabia
- Country: Saudi Arabia
- Location: Tayif city
- Coordinates: 21°16′13.001″N 40°24′56.998″E
- Purpose: Flood control
- Opening date: 1984; 42 years ago
- Owner: Ministry of Environment, Water and Agriculture (Saudi Arabia)

The Arda dam, also known as the Wadi Arda dam, is a dam in Saudi Arabia opened in 1984 and located in Tayif city of Mecca region. The main purpose of the dam is flood control. The estimated cost of the dam is SR140 million (US 37,33 million).

== See also ==
- List of dams in Saudi Arabia
