= Abdullah bin Abdul Rahman Al Hussein =

Saudi engineer and politician

Minister of Water and Electricity
- Incumbent
- Assumed office 13 April 2004
- Prime Minister: King Fahd; King Abdullah

Personal details
- Education: Georgia Institute of Technology

Abdullah bin Abdul Rahman Al Hussein (Arabic: عبد الله بن عبد الرحمن الحصين) is a Saudi engineer. He has been the minister of water and electricity since 2004.

== Education ==
Al Hussein obtained a bachelor of science degree in electrical engineering in 1973. He received a master of science degree in computer science from Georgia Institute of Technology in 1976.

== Career ==
Al Hussein began his career as a lecturer at King Saud University and served there from 1974 to 1977. He served as the director of the computer department at the Saline Water Conversion Corporation from 1977 to 1980. Next, he worked as the director of the operation and maintenance department at the same institution from 1980 to 1985. Al Hussein was named as the governor of the Saline Water Conversion Corporation in 2001 and his term lasted until 2003. He served as the deputy board chairman of the water and electricity company from 2003 to 2004. He has been minister of water and electricity since 13 April 2004.
