= Asem Dam =

Asem dam
- Location within Saudi Arabia
- Country: Saudi Arabia
- Location: Asir
- Coordinates: 19°41′47″N 42°29′15″E
- Purpose: Other
- Opening date: 1984; 42 years ago
- Owner: Ministry of Environment, Water and Agriculture (Saudi Arabia)

The Asem dam is a dam in Saudi Arabia opened in 1984 and located in Asir region.

== See also ==
- List of dams in Saudi Arabia
