= Laya Dam =

Laya dam
- Location within Saudi Arabia
- Country: Saudi Arabia
- Location: Makkah
- Coordinates: 21°25′15″N 39°49′37″E
- Purpose: Flood control
- Opening date: 1982; 44 years ago
- Owner: Ministry of Environment, Water and Agriculture (Saudi Arabia)

The Laya dam is a dam in Saudi Arabia opened in 1982 and located in Makkah region. The main purpose of the dam is flood control.

== See also ==
- List of dams in Saudi Arabia
