= Bdwah Dam =

Bdwah dam
- Location within Saudi Arabia
- Country: Saudi Arabia
- Location: Asir
- Coordinates: 19°41′47″N 42°29′15″E
- Purpose: Flood control
- Opening date: 2002; 24 years ago
- Owner: Ministry of Environment, Water and Agriculture (Saudi Arabia)

The Bdwah dam is a dam in Saudi Arabia that was opened in 2002 and is located in the Asir region. The main purpose of the dam is flood control.

== See also ==
- List of dams in Saudi Arabia
