= Fareah Dam =

Fareah dam
- Location within Saudi Arabia
- Country: Saudi Arabia
- Location: Madinah
- Coordinates: 23°20′36.8″N 39°39′47.7″E
- Purpose: Flood control
- Opening date: 1982; 44 years ago
- Owner: Ministry of Environment, Water and Agriculture (Saudi Arabia)

The Fareah dam is a dam in Saudi Arabia opened in 1982 and located in Madinah region. The main purpose of the dam is flood control.

== See also ==
- List of dams in Saudi Arabia
