= Ashran Dam =

Ashran dam
- Location within Saudi Arabia
- Interactive map of Ashran dam
- Country: Saudi Arabia
- Location: Asir
- Coordinates: 19°41′47″N 42°29′15″E
- Purpose: Flood control
- Opening date: 1985; 41 years ago
- Owner: Ministry of Environment, Water and Agriculture (Saudi Arabia)

Dam and spillways
- Type of dam: Barrage

The Ashran dam is a dam in Saudi Arabia opened in 1985 and located in Asir region. The main purpose of the dam is flood control.

== See also ==
- List of dams in Saudi Arabia
