= Maslah Dam =

Maslah dam
- Location within Saudi Arabia
- Country: Saudi Arabia
- Location: Baha
- Coordinates: 20°0′0″N 41°30′0″E
- Purpose: Flood control
- Opening date: 1984; 42 years ago
- Owner: Ministry of Environment, Water and Agriculture (Saudi Arabia)

The Maslah dam is a dam in Saudi Arabia opened in 1984 and located in Baha region. The main purpose of the dam is flood control.

== See also ==
- List of dams in Saudi Arabia
