= SWCC =

SWCC may refer to:

- Special warfare combatant-craft crewmen
- Second World Climate Conference
- Southwestern Christian College
- Saline Water Conversion Corporation
- Socialism with Chinese characteristics
- Star Wars Celebration Chicago
