= Araer Dam =

Araer dam
- Location within Saudi Arabia
- Country: Saudi Arabia
- Location: Asir
- Coordinates: 19°41′47″N 42°29′15″E
- Purpose: Flood control
- Opening date: 1985; 41 years ago
- Owner: Ministry of Environment, Water and Agriculture (Saudi Arabia)

The Araer dam is a dam in Saudi Arabia opened in 1985 and located in Asir region. The main purpose of the dam is flood control. In addition to flood control, the dam manages water resources by storing rainwater, which can be utilized for agricultural and municipal needs.

== See also ==
- List of dams in Saudi Arabia
