= Nawfla Dam =

Nawfla dam
- Location within Saudi Arabia
- Country: Saudi Arabia
- Location: Ta'if
- Coordinates: 21°16′13.001″N 40°24′56.998″E
- Purpose: Other
- Opening date: 1988; 38 years ago
- Owner: Ministry of Environment, Water and Agriculture (Saudi Arabia)

The Nawfla dam is a dam in Saudi Arabia opened in 1988 and located in Taif city of Makkah region.

== See also ==
- List of dams in Saudi Arabia
