= Aayash Dam =

Dam in Asir, Saudi Arabia

- Location within Saudi Arabia
- Country: Saudi Arabia
- Location: Asir
- Coordinates: 19°41′47″N 42°29′15″E
- Purpose: Flood control
- Opening date: 2005; 21 years ago
- Owner: Ministry of Environment, Water and Agriculture (Saudi Arabia)

The Aayash Dam is a dam in Saudi Arabia, opened in 2005. It is located in 'Asir region, in the southwest of the country, and its main purpose is to control flood.

== See also ==
- List of dams in Saudi Arabia
