= Tahlia Street (Riyadh) =

Commercial road in Riyadh, Saudi Arabia

Prince Mohammed Bin Abdulaziz Road
- al-Tahlia Street al-Zaki Street
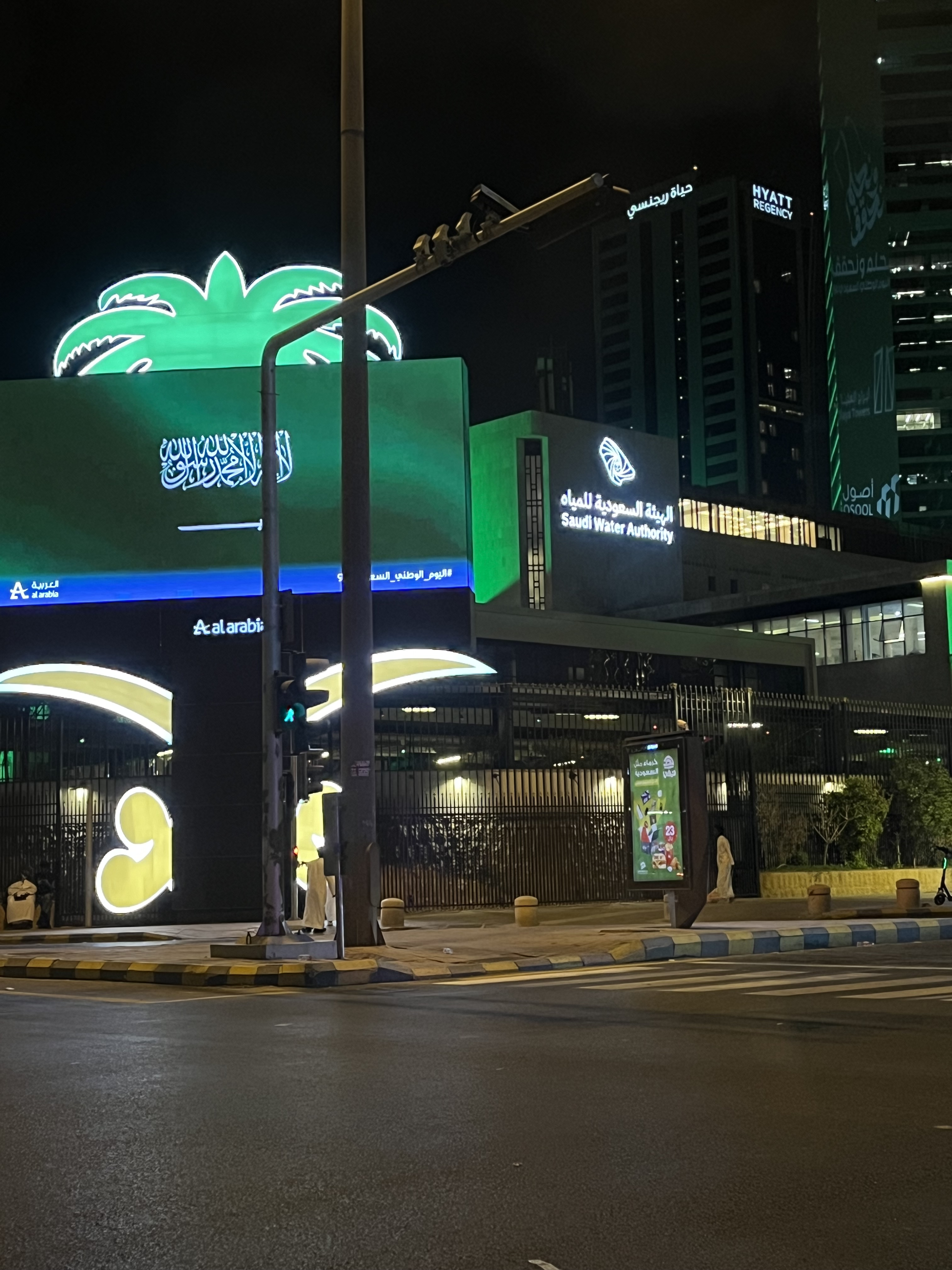
- Office of Saudi Water Authority at Tahliah Street, 2024
- Interactive map of Prince Mohammed Bin Abdulaziz Road
- Native name: شارع التحلية (Arabic)
- Namesake: Muhammad bin Abdulaziz
- Location: Riyadh, Saudi Arabia
- Coordinates: 24°38′28″N 46°42′52″E

Prince Mohammed Bin Abdulaziz Road (Arabic: طريق الأمير محمد بن عبد العزيز), better known as al-Tahlia Street (Arabic: شارع التحلية, lit. 'the desalinating street') and al-Zaki Street (Arabic: شارع الذكي, lit. 'the smart street'), is a 4.75 km east–west commercial thoroughfare in northern Riyadh, Saudi Arabia. The street is named after the building of Saline Water Conversion Corporation, which is situated on its westernmost part. Tahliah Street is a popular attraction among youngsters since 2004, especially when the Saudi government introduced free Wi-Fi scheme in the avenue following its renovation by Omrania and Associates. It hosts several outlets of multinational chains of restaurants and cafeterias. The street has been compared to the Champs-Élysées avenue in Paris, France and most of its visitors flock during weekends, Eid al-Fitr, Eid al-Adha and national holidays.

It branches out from Prince Turki bin Abdulaziz al-Awwal Road in al-Maʼdhar neighborhood and terminates at Prince Abdulaziz ibn Mosa’ad bin Jalawi Street in al-Sulaimaniyah district, cutting through al-Olaya.

The street began to lose its status of a preferred leisure destination by 2019 as a result of the emergence of new entertainment centers in Riyadh under Saudi Vision 2030.

== Gallery ==
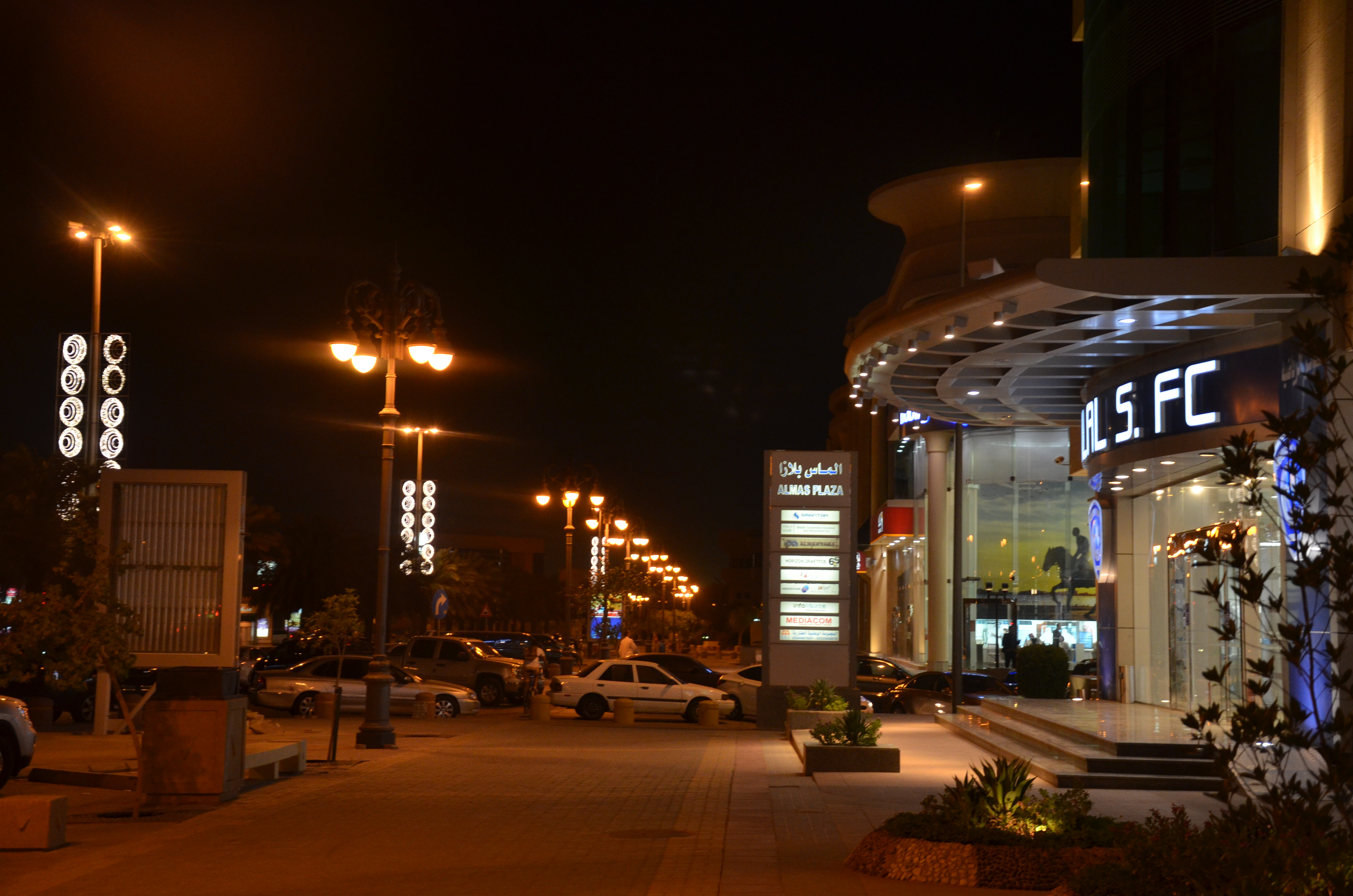
Almas Plaza, 2012

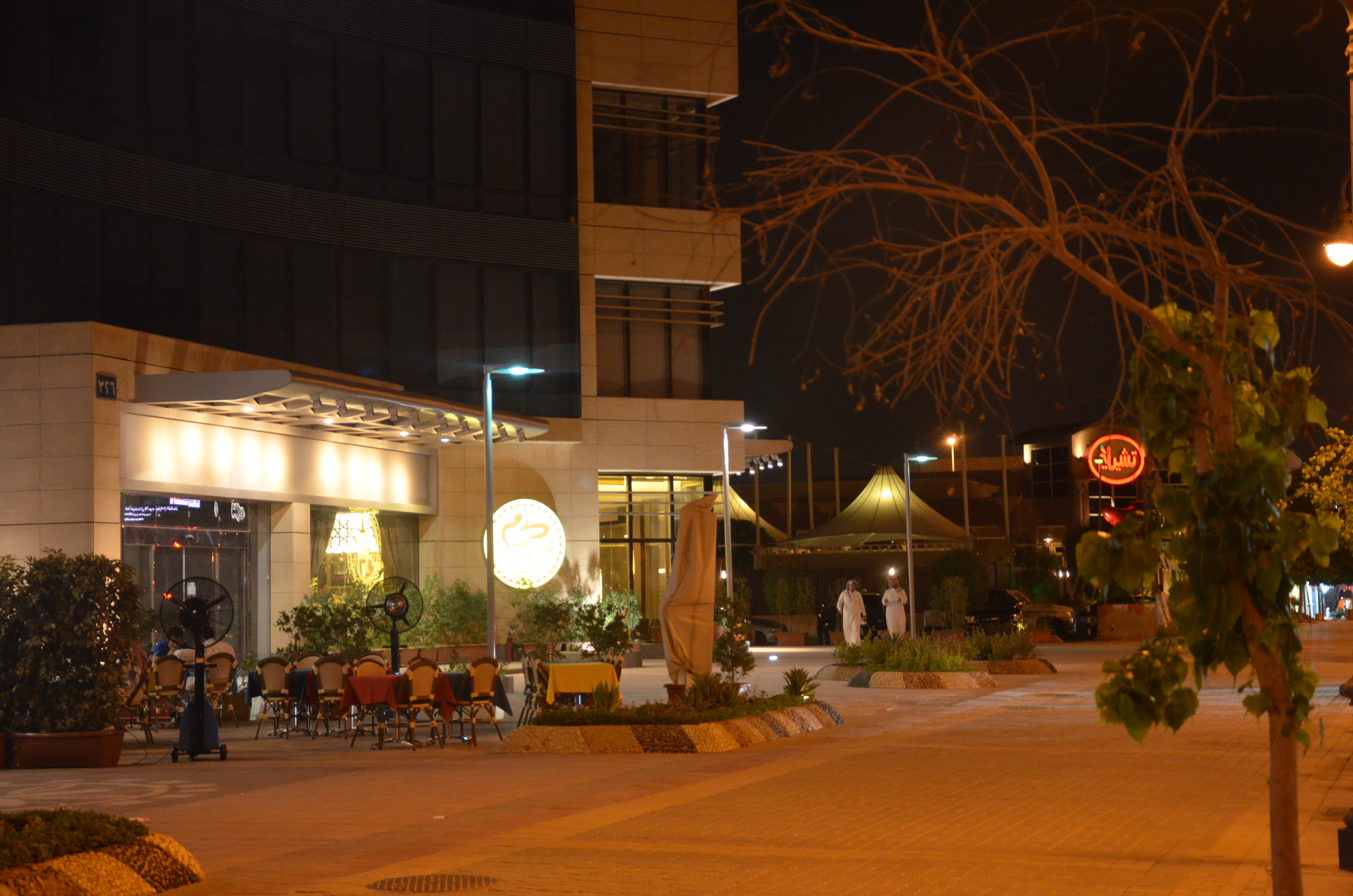
Karam Beirut Restaurant, 2012
