= Rabigh Dam =

- Location within Saudi Arabia
- Country: Saudi Arabia
- Location: Rabigh, Makkah Province
- Coordinates: 22°49′17.23″N 39°22′35.06″E
- Purpose: Flood control, municipal water, groundwater recharge
- Construction began: 2003
- Opening date: 2009; 17 years ago
- Owners: Ministry of Water and Electricity

Dam and spillways
- Type of dam: Gravity
- Impounds: Wadi Rabigh
- Height (foundation): 80.5 m (264 ft)
- Height (thalweg): 59.5 m (195 ft)
- Length: 380 m (1,250 ft)
- Width (crest): 5 m (16 ft)
- Width (base): 60 m (200 ft)
- Dam volume: 585,000 m^{3} (765,000 cu yd)
- Spillway type: Overflow, 12 openings
- Spillway capacity: 7,856 m^{3}/s (277,400 cu ft/s)

Reservoir
- Total capacity: 220,350,000 m^{3} (178,640 acre⋅ft)
- Catchment area: 3,456 km^{2} (1,334 mi^{2})
- Surface area: 13.58 km^{2} (5.24 mi^{2})

The Rabigh Dam is a gravity dam on Wadi Rabigh about 35 km (22 mi) east of Rabigh in Makkah Province of western Saudi Arabia. The dam has many purposes to include flood control, municipal water supply and groundwater recharge. Water from the dam's reservoir is treated before being supplied to Rabigh. The dam was constructed between 2003 and 2008. It is owned and operated by the Ministry of Water and Electricity.

== See also ==
- List of dams in Saudi Arabia
