= Wadi al-Rummah =

Valley in Saudi Arabia

Coordinates: 25°48′22″N 42°52′23″E

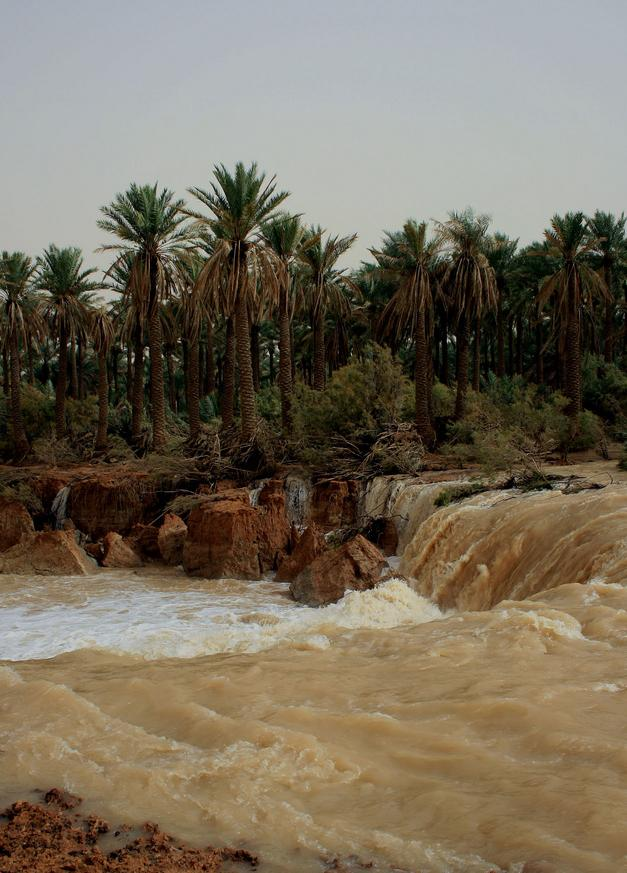
- The wadi flowing in November 2008

- Map of the combined drainage basins of the Wadi al-Rummah and Wadi Al-Batin

Physical characteristics
- Mouth: Shatt Al Arab
- Length: 600 km (370 mi)

Wadi al-Rummah (Saudi Arabia)

Wadi al-Rummah or ar-Rummah (Arabic: وادي الرمة) with a length of almost 600 km (370 mi) is the largest seasonal Endorheic river, or wadi, in the Arabian Peninsula. Flowing for an estimated 60 days of the year, it is important for agriculture in a region considered the breadbasket of Saudi Arabia. The wadi originates near Medina at Jibāl al Abyaḑ (the White Mountain). It then runs northeast, joining several smaller wadis, including Mohalla Wadi and Murghala Wadi to the north and Jifn Wadi and Jarir Wadi to the south. It ends at the Thuayrat Dunes of the ad-Dahna Desert in Al-Qassim Province, near Buraidah.

The wadi then sinks beneath the sand dunes and emerges on the other side of the desert as Wadi al-Batin (approx. 425 km (264 mi)), which continues towards the northeast and forms the western boundary of Kuwait. It empties into the Persian Gulf.

The wadi is wide, for it was once a major river, possibly the modern location of the biblical Pishon. According to Dr. Abdullah Al-Musnad from the University of Qassim, about 10,000 years ago it was a perennial river flowing from Medina to the Persian Gulf, with a total length of 1,200 km (750 mi). Periods of drought, largely after the mid 1800s, and the movement of sand at Althwairat and Dahna cut the course of the valley into three parts: Wadi al-Rummah (the longest, at 600 km (370 mi)), Wadi Aloddi (45 km (28 mi)), and Wadi al-Batin (450 km (280 mi)). In 1838 the wadi overflowed, creating a 200-square-mile (520 km^{2}) lake that persisted for two years and attracted water birds, which had only sometimes been seen in the wadi.

Farouk El-Baz piqued the interest of Biblical scholars around the world with his description of the drainage of the Arabian Peninsula into the Persian Gulf. Evidence from satellite datasets, especially from the radar images taken during the 1994 mission of the Space Shuttle Endeavour, support the idea that a major river once flowed across Arabia and connected with the Tigris and Euphrates Rivers near Kuwait. El-Baz called it the Kuwait River. The Wadi Al-Batin or Wadi Al-Rummah river system would have been responsible for deposition of the Dib DiBa Formation (similar to an alluvial fan deposit). This river system may have been active 2500–3000 BC, and it is active seasonally to this day.

== See also ==
- List of wadis of Saudi Arabia
