= Al-Hariq =

Governorate in Riyadh Province, Saudi Arabia

Al-Hariq الحريق
- Governorate
- Location of Al-Hariq Governorate within Riyadh Province

- Location within Saudi Arabia
- Coordinates: 23.63°N 46.51°E
- Country: Saudi Arabia
- Province: Riyadh Province
- Region: Najd
- Seat: Al-Hariq City

Government
  - Type: Municipality
  - Body: Al-Hariq Municipality

Area
  - Total: 6,790 km^{2} (2,620 sq mi)

Population (2022)
  - Total: 10,864
  - Density: 1.60/km^{2} (4.14/sq mi)
- Time zone: UTC+03:00 (SAST)
- ISO 3166-2: SA-01
- Area code: 011

Al-Hariq (also spelled Al-Hareeg; Arabic: الحريق) is a governorate in Riyadh Province, Saudi Arabia, located in the central part of the province.

== Economy and Agriculture ==
Al-Hariq is a prominent agricultural hub within the central Najd region, characterized by its fertile soil and traditional farming infrastructure. Supported by the Hareeq Dam—a civil structure built in 1984 to manage seasonal floods and sustain the local water table—the governorate produces approximately 5,000 tons of citrus crops annually. The local agricultural sector features more than 340 specialized farms cultivating over 20 distinct varieties of citrus, including oranges, tangerines, lemons, and citrons. In addition to citrus cultivation, the region is noted for its production of dates and local honey, which serve as vital contributors to the rural economy.

=== Al-Hariq Citrus Festival ===
The governorate hosts the annual Al-Hariq Citrus Festival, a 10-day cultural and commercial event held between late December and early January under the patronage of the Governor of the Riyadh Province. Serving as a major platform for agritourism, the festival features over 50 specialized pavilions, agricultural nurseries, and exhibits from local food, honey, and date companies. The event regularly attracts tens of thousands of visitors to the region, offering guided tours across private agricultural estates, family entertainment, and educational workshops. This initiative forms part of broader regional development plans under Saudi Vision 2030, aiming to expand local marketing channels, improve farmers' economic returns, and develop sustainable tourism outside the capital.

== See also ==
- Provinces of Saudi Arabia
- List of governorates of Saudi Arabia
- List of cities and towns in Saudi Arabia
