= List of ambassadors of Saudi Arabia to Turkey =

Coordinates: 39.896073°N 32.864577°E

Ambassador of Saudi Arabia to Turkey
- سفير خادم الحرمين الشريفين لدى جمهورية تركيا (Ambassador of the Custodian of the Two Holy Mosques to Turkey)
- Coat of Arms of Saudi Arabia
- Incumbent; Waleed A. Elkhereiji since October 4, 2018
- Inaugural holder: Fouad Bey Hamza
- Formation: 1943

The Saudi ambassador in Ankara is the official representative of the Government in Riyadh to the Government of Turkey, concurrently he is accredited to Baku (Azerbaijan).

== List of representatives ==
| Diplomatic accreditation | Ambassador | Arabic | Observations | King of Saudi Arabia | Prime Minister of Turkey | Term end |
|---|---|---|---|---|---|---|
| 1943 | Fuad Hamza | فؤاد حمزة | Hamza, Fouad Bey (né en 1899) : Libanais, diplomate au service de l'Arabie Saoudite. | Ibn Saud | Ahmet Fikri Tüzer | 1945 |
| 1955 | Sayid Tawfik Hamza | سيد توفيق حمزة | | Ibn Saud | Adnan Menderes | |
| 1957 | Kazi Mustafa Kamal | كازي مصطفى كمال | | Saud of Saudi Arabia | Adnan Menderes | |
| 1957 | Saleh Mustafa Islam | صالح مصطفى إسلام | | Saud of Saudi Arabia | Adnan Menderes | 1963 |
| 1966 | Samir Shihabi | سمير الشهابي | | Faisal of Saudi Arabia | Suad Hayri Ürgüplü | 1971 |
| 1973 | Anas Yusuf Yassin | انس يوسف ياسين | | Faisal of Saudi Arabia | Mehmet Naim Talu | 1974 |
| 1974 | Mohammed Said Basrawi | محمد سعيد البصراوي | | Faisal of Saudi Arabia | Mustafa Bülent Ecevit | March 1, 1976 |
| March 1, 1976 | Fouad Abdulhameed Alkhateeb | فؤاد عبد الحميد الخطيب | | Faisal of Saudi Arabia | Mustafa Bülent Ecevit | June 1, 1976 |
| 1980 | Sheikh Muhammad Al Awadi | الشيخ محمد العوضي | In 1976 he war minister of commerce and industry. | Khalid of Saudi Arabia | Bülent Ulusu | 1984 |
| January 1, 1986 | Abdulaziz bin Mohieddin Khoja | عبدالعزيز بن محي الدين الهودشة | | Fahd of Saudi Arabia | Turgut Özal | 1991 |
| January 1, 1993 | Naji Sadiq al Mufti | ناجي صادق المفتي | | Fahd of Saudi Arabia | Tansu Çiller | 2004 |
| April 7, 2009 | Mohammed Raja Abdullah Al-Hussaini Al Sharif | محمد رجا عبد الله الحسيني الشريف | | Abdullah of Saudi Arabia | Recep Tayyip Erdoğan | |
| May 16, 2013 | Adel bin Siraj Mirdad | عادل سراج الدين مرداد | 25 January 2017 It was pointed out that Ambassador Adel Serajedin Merdad left Turkey three weeks ago after the end of his term, and that he has not made any statement, whether to the BBC or to any other media outlet, over recent months. | Abdullah of Saudi Arabia | Abdullah Gül | January 4, 2017 |
| October 4, 2018 | Waleed A. Elkhereiji | وليد بن عبدالكريم الخريجي | Turkey summons Saudi ambassador over journalist's disappearance at consulate in Istanbul | Salman of Saudi Arabia | Recep Tayyip Erdoğan | |
