= Plant Health Department (Saudi Arabia) =

Saudi Arabian agency

- الإدارة العامة للثروة النباتية; Al'iidarat Aleamat Liltharwat Alnabatia

Department overview
- Jurisdiction: Government of Saudi Arabia
- Headquarters: Ministry of Environment, Water and Agriculture; King Abdulaziz Road P.O. Box 11195 Saudi Arabia
- Department executive: General Manager, Ayman Saad
- Parent department: Ministry of Environment, Water and Agriculture
- Child agencies: Plant Product Safety Division; Phytosanitary Division
- Website: mewa.gov.sa/en/Ministry/Agencies/AgencyofAgriculture/Departments/Pages/General-Directorate-of-Plant-Health-and-Protection.aspx

The Plant Health Department is the phytosanitary agency of Saudi Arabia, a department of the Ministry of Environment, Water and Agriculture. PHD conducts inspections in the country, enforces quarantines, develops and proposes legislation, and produces plans, relevant to plant pests within the Kingdom. Externally, PHD is responsible for diplomacy related to plant health and international trade in agricultural inputs (including pesticides) and products. International treaties and bodies include the IPPC (International Plant Protection Convention), the WTO (World Trade Organization), and the Agreement on Technical Barriers to Trade.

PHD also functions as a research organization, carrying out research, testing, and validation of plant protection methods and substances, and traveling to participate in local and international academic and industry conferences.
