= Bisha =

Bisha بيشة
- Governorate
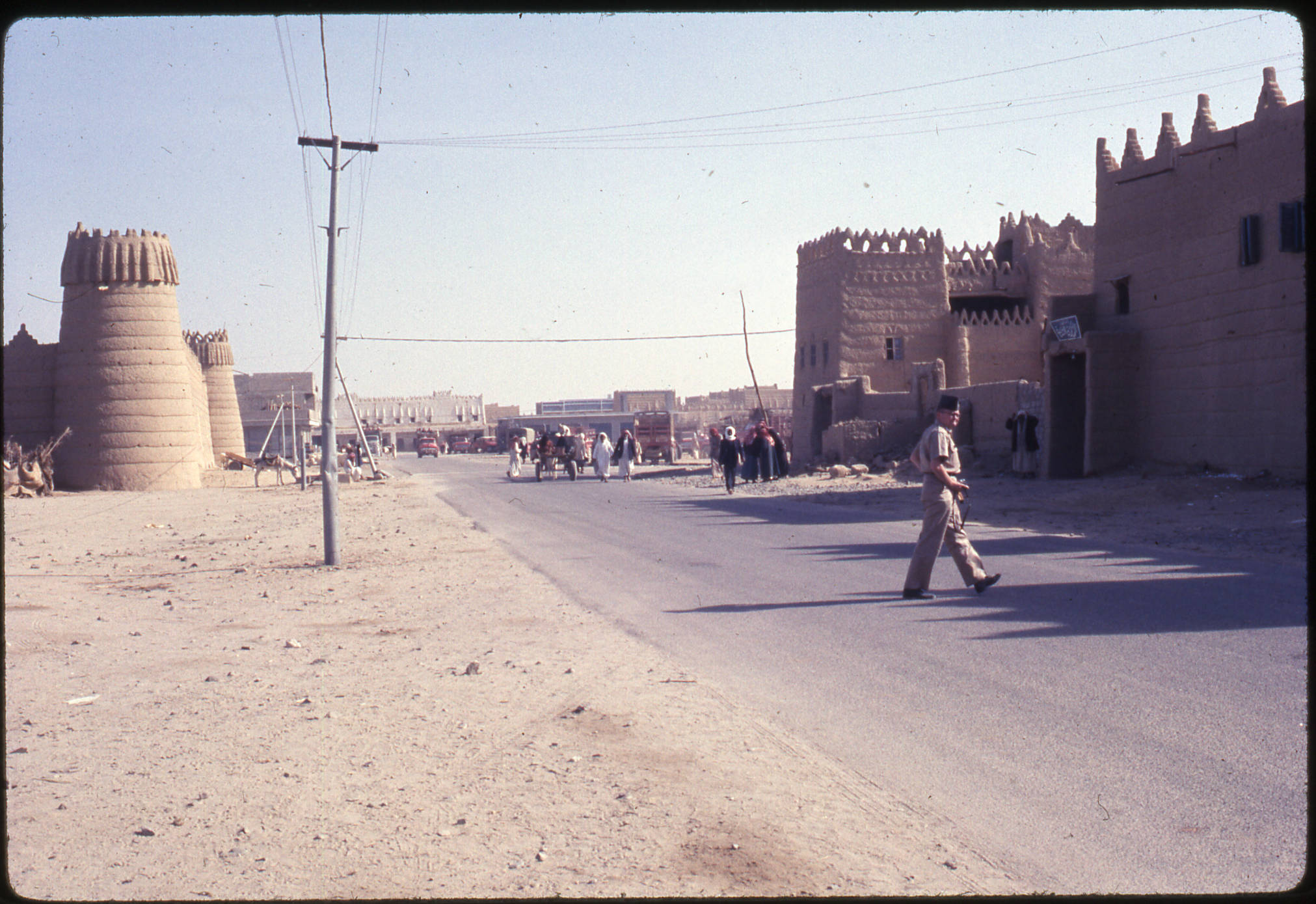
- 1968 view of the city

- Location in Asir Province, Saudi Arabia
- Coordinates: 20°00′N 042°36′E
- Country: Saudi Arabia
- Province: Asir

Population (2022 census)
  - Urban: 115,537
  - Metro: 202,096

Bisha (Arabic: بيشة, Bīšah), also known as Qal`at Bishah (Arabic: قلعة بيشة, Qalʿat Bīšah), is a town in the south-western Saudi Arabian province, Asir. Bisha was its own province before merging with its neighboring province, Asir. Bisha has a population of 202,096 according to the 2022 Census in the governorate, with nearly 240 villages and 58 larger settlements that are spread out on both sides of the Bisha Valley (the longest valley in the Arabian Peninsula). The city is located to the south of the Arabian Peninsula, which is almost entirely under the administration of the kingdom. It stands at an altitude of approximately 610 meters (2,000 ft.) above sea level.

== Agriculture ==
The Bisha area is of immense agricultural importance due to high soil fertility, abundant water, and palm cultivation. There are around 3,000,000 palm trees, among other trees of multiple varieties, and their fruits are sold widely to cities in the vicinity.

The government of Saudi Arabia's strategic plan involves using a newly constructed dam to supply water to population centers rather than to irrigate farms. The Ministry of Agriculture and Water was concerned about the Bisha area's dependence on groundwater and initially decided to construct a dam in the Bisha Valley (King Fahad Dam) to support agricultural activities in the region. However, due to the scarcity of clean drinking water, the dam output has been redirected for drinking purposes, resulting in a sharp decline of agricultural output.

=== Climate ===
Bisha has a hot desert climate (Köppen climate classification BWh).

Climate data for Bisha Domestic Airport (1991–2020)
Month	Jan	Feb	Mar	Apr	May	Jun	Jul	Aug	Sep	Oct	Nov	Dec	Year
Record high °C (°F)	34.8 (94.6)	37.2 (99.0)	38.6 (101.5)	39.8 (103.6)	42.2 (108.0)	43.2 (109.8)	44.8 (112.6)	44.4 (111.9)	42.4 (108.3)	38.3 (100.9)	35.4 (95.7)	34.3 (93.7)	44.8 (112.6)
Mean daily maximum °C (°F)	26.2 (79.2)	29.0 (84.2)	31.7 (89.1)	34.3 (93.7)	37.6 (99.7)	39.9 (103.8)	40.0 (104.0)	40.1 (104.2)	38.0 (100.4)	33.4 (92.1)	29.7 (85.5)	27.0 (80.6)	33.9 (93.0)
Daily mean °C (°F)	17.7 (63.9)	20.5 (68.9)	23.5 (74.3)	26.4 (79.5)	29.8 (85.6)	32.3 (90.1)	32.9 (91.2)	32.7 (90.9)	30.0 (86.0)	25.4 (77.7)	21.5 (70.7)	18.4 (65.1)	25.9 (78.6)
Mean daily minimum °C (°F)	9.3 (48.7)	11.8 (53.2)	15.3 (59.5)	18.8 (65.8)	21.8 (71.2)	23.7 (74.7)	25.4 (77.7)	25.0 (77.0)	21.2 (70.2)	16.2 (61.2)	12.9 (55.2)	9.8 (49.6)	17.6 (63.7)
Record low °C (°F)	−1.0 (30.2)	2.8 (37.0)	4.0 (39.2)	8.8 (47.8)	14.0 (57.2)	17.2 (63.0)	17.6 (63.7)	17.5 (63.5)	13.0 (55.4)	8.0 (46.4)	3.8 (38.8)	0.8 (33.4)	−1.0 (30.2)
Average precipitation mm (inches)	8.7 (0.34)	0.9 (0.04)	10.8 (0.43)	30.2 (1.19)	11.9 (0.47)	2.7 (0.11)	0.8 (0.03)	3.2 (0.13)	0.0 (0.0)	2.0 (0.08)	7.3 (0.29)	1.8 (0.07)	80.3 (3.16)
Average precipitation days (≥ 1.0 mm)	0.9	0.3	1.5	4.0	2.0	0.2	0.3	0.6	0.0	0.5	0.9	0.4	11.5
Average relative humidity (%)	43	39	37	35	28	17	18	20	18	21	32	41	29
Mean monthly sunshine hours	260.4	226.0	269.7	246.0	275.9	297.0	275.9	269.7	285.0	300.7	279.0	260.4	3,245.7
Mean daily sunshine hours	8.4	8.0	8.7	8.2	8.9	9.9	8.9	8.7	9.5	9.7	9.3	8.4	8.9
Source 1: NOAA
Source 2: Deutscher Wetterdienst (humidity 1973–1993, sun 1991-1998)

== See also ==
Education:

It has University of Bisha which offers education in a range of professional and non professional courses at graduate levels. The city also has a number of colleges for male and female which are offering graduate courses.

- List of cities and towns in Saudi Arabia
