= Abdullah bin Ibrahim Al-Abdulkarim =

Saudi Water Authority president

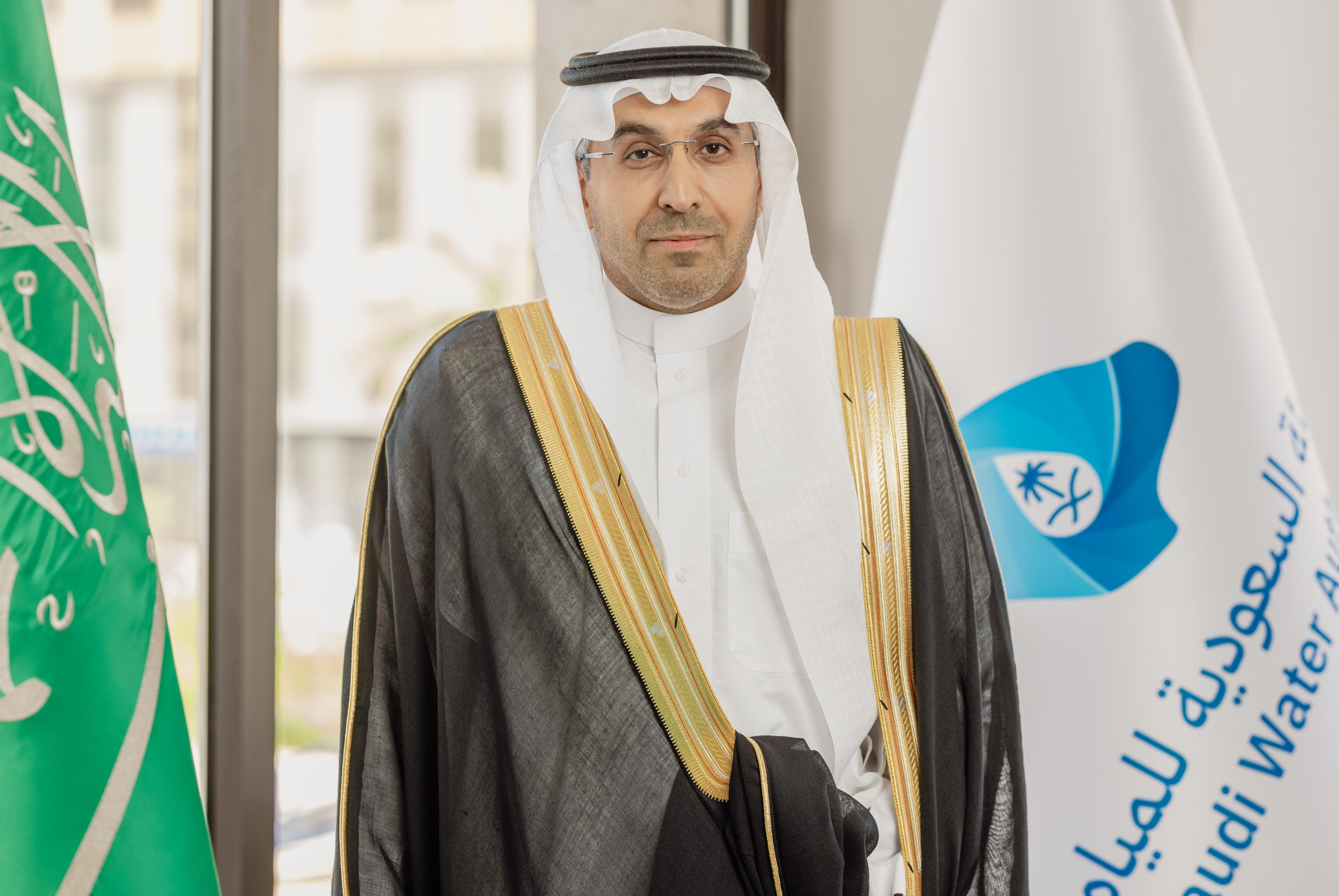
- Education: King Saud University, Riyadh
- Occupation: Computer Engineer
- Title: President of Saudi Water Authority (SWA)
- Term: May 2020 – present

H.E. Abdullah bin Ibrahim Al-Abdulkarim (Arabic: عبدالله بن إبراهيم العبدالكريم) currently serves as the President of the Saudi Water Authority (SWA). Previously, he held the position of Governor at The Saline Water Conversion Corporation (SWCC), the largest producer of desalinated water with production capacity of 11.5 million cubic meters per day. In addition to his role at SWA, Al-Abdulkarim is a board member of the SWA, Founder and chair of the board of directors at the Water Transmission and Technologies Company (WTTCO) that oversees a network of 7 transmission systems on over 11,800 kilometers, with a daily transmission capacity of 18 million cubic meters. Al-Abdulkarim also holds the position of vice-chairman at the Water Solutions Company (WSM) fully owned by Public Investment Fund (PIF).

== Education ==
Abdullah bin Ibrahim Al-Abdulkarim holds a bachelor's degree in computer engineering from King Saud University in Riyadh.

== Career ==
Abdullah bin Ibrahim Al-Abdulkarim worked in the water industry for nearly thirty years, primarily within the public sector, holding various roles and responsibilities within Saudi Arabia's Saline Water Conversion Corporation (SWCC), a government corporation that operates desalination plants and power stations in Saudi Arabia. SWCC (now known as SWA – the Saudi Water Authority) is the largest desalinating sea water authority in the world, responsible for 20% of worldwide desalinated water production and the second-largest electrical provider in the Kingdom of Saudi Arabia. Abdullah bin Ibrahim Al-Abdulkarim joined SWCC in 1997 and held several senior positions within the corporation until 2014. In 2007, he assumed the role of Process Reengineering, where he led transformative initiatives to streamline operations and enhance efficiency. He was appointed Head of Strategic Planning in 2009, followed by the appointment to the role of General Manager of Strategic Planning and Budgeting in 2010.

In 2014, Abdullah bin Ibrahim Al-Abdulkarim became Deputy Governor of Saline Water Conversion Corporation, a role he held until 2020. As Deputy Governor, he focused on developing and executing the company's strategic plans aligned with the Kingdom of Saudi Arabia Vision 2030, focusing on opportunities for improvement processes leveraging emerging technologies of water desalination and distribution systems, and worked with various government entities, private organizations, and international partners.

In May 2020, Abdullah bin Ibrahim Al-Abdulkarim was appointed Governor of Saline Water Conversion Corporation, by royal decree, and he continued to hold his other appointments as Chairman of Water Transmission and Technologies Company (WTTCO), and Vice Chairman of Water Solution Management (WSM).

Abdullah bin Ibrahim Al-Abdulkarim was appointed for a further 4-year term as president of The Saudi Water Authority (SWA), with the announcement of the name change and expanded mandate in May 2024.
