= Fahd bin Abdul Rahman Balghunaim =

Saudi engineer (born 1952)

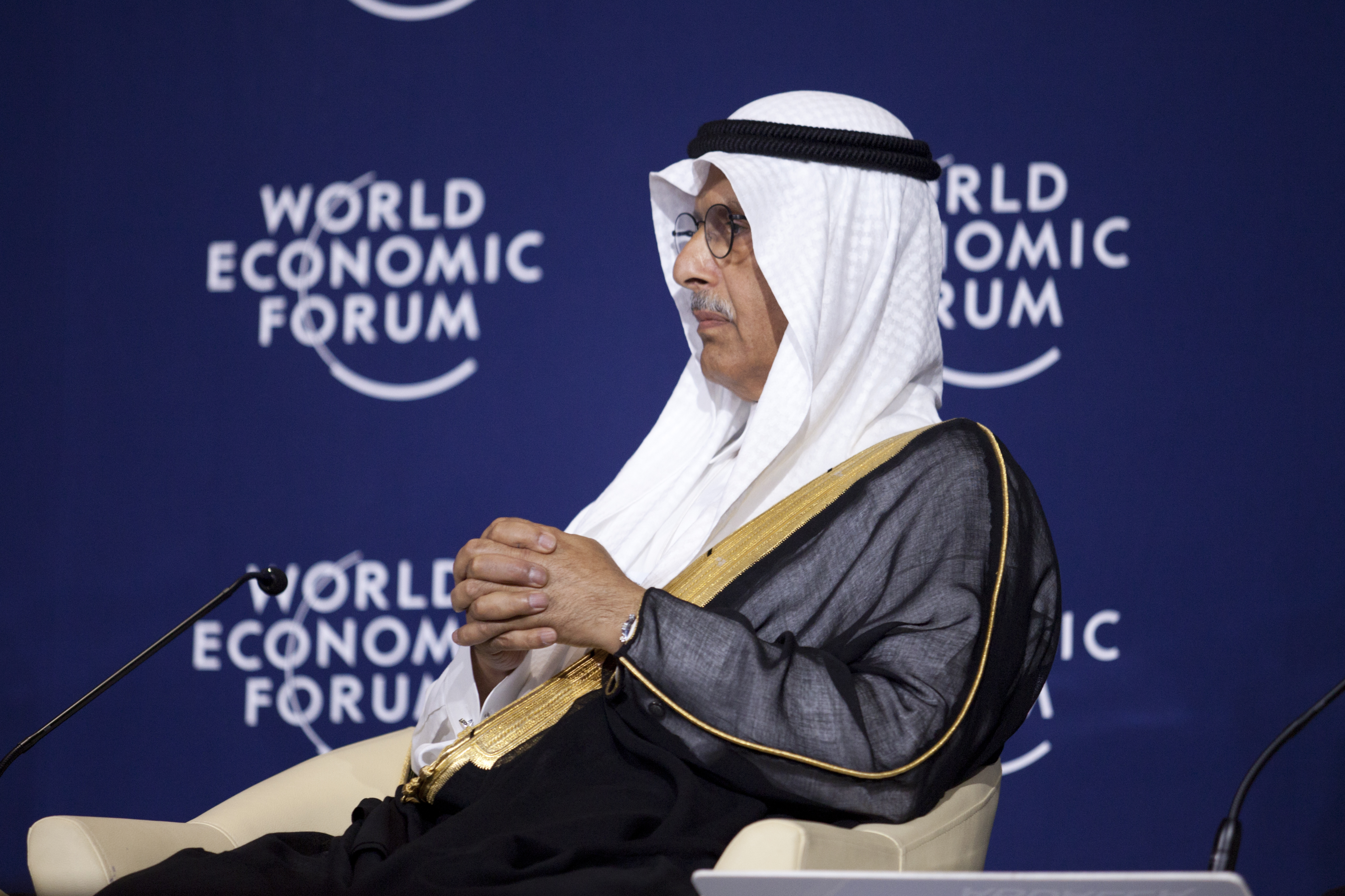

Minister of Agriculture
- In office May 2003 – 8 December 2014
- Prime Minister: King Fahd; King Abdullah
- Succeeded by: Walid bin Abdulkarim Al Khuraiji

Personal details
- Born: 27 March 1952 (age 74)
- Education: King Fahd University of Petroleum and Minerals; Stanford University; University of Michigan

Fahd bin Abdul Rahman Balghunaim (Arabic: فهد بن عبد الرحمن بالغنيم; born 27 March 1952) is a Saudi engineer. He served as the Minister of Agriculture between May 2003 and December 2014.

== Early life and education ==
Balghunaim was born on 27 March 1952. He obtained a bachelor of science degree in civil engineering from King Fahd University of Petroleum and Minerals in 1975 and a master's degree in construction, engineering and management from Stanford University in 1978. He also received a PhD in transportation engineering from the University of Michigan in 1984.

== Career ==
From 1975 to 1990 Balghunaim worked as an academic first at King Fahd University of Petroleum and Minerals and then at King Saud University. He served as the deputy agriculture minister responsible for fisheries for one year (1990-1991). Then he was named as governor of the Saline Water Conversion Corporation (SWCC) in 1991. His tenure lasted until 2001. He became a member of the Shoura Council in 2001. He served as a member of the services, public facilities and environment committee in the council until 2003.

Balghunaim was appointed minister of agriculture in May 2003 and served in the post until 8 December 2014 when Walid bin Abdulkarim Al Khuraiji replaced him in the post.

From 2015 Balghunaim became the chairman of AAW and Partners Consulting Engineer and of Tarsheed Company for Agricultural Development and Investment.

Political offices
Preceded by	Minister of Agriculture; 2003 – 2014	Succeeded by Walid bin Abdulkarim Al Khuraiji
