= Sitae Alhven Dam =

Dam in Saudi Arabia

- Location within Saudi Arabia
- Country: Saudi Arabia
- Coordinates: 26.7932475°N 41.7343441°E

Sitae Alhven Dam (in Arabic: سد وسيطاء الحفن) is a gravity dam in southern Saudi Arabia.
