= Wadi Al Disah =

Geographic area in Tabuk, Saudi Arabia

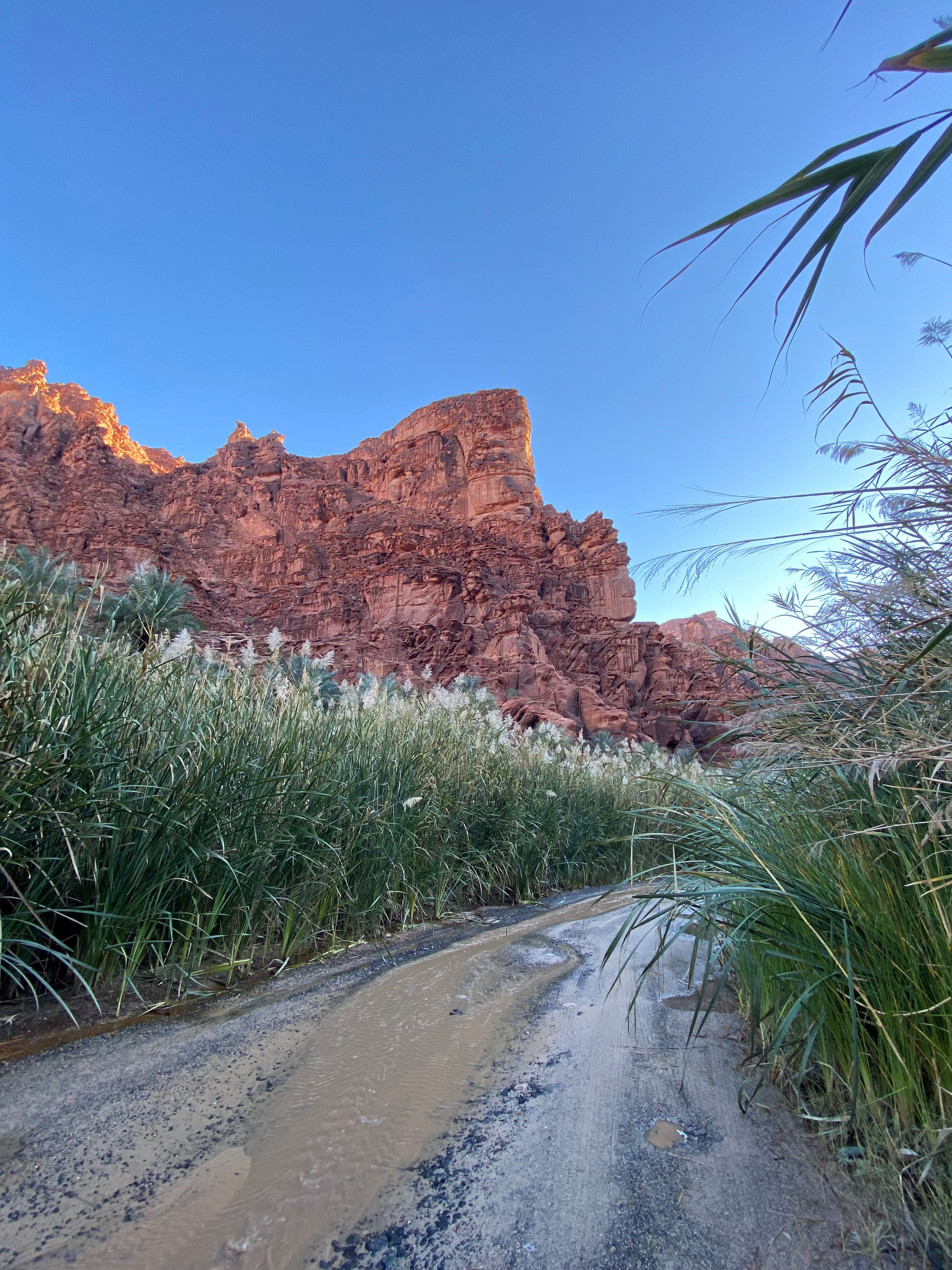

- Location within Saudi Arabia Location within Asia

Geography
- Country: Saudi Arabia
- State/Province: Tabuk Province
- Coordinates: 27°37′52″N 36°32′58″E
- Interactive map of Wadi Al Disah

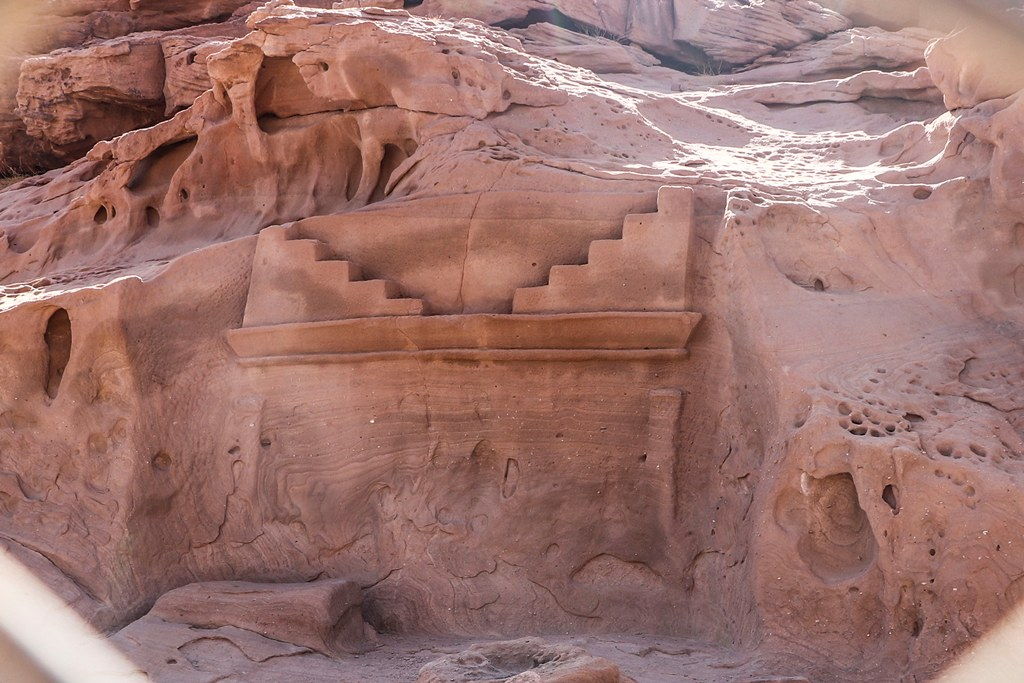
Nabataean tomb facade

Wadi Al Disah (Arabic: وادي الديسة) is a valley in a mountainous area located in the southwest of Tabuk Province in northwestern Saudi Arabia. The wadi is characterized by an abundance of groundwater, palm trees, and wild herbs. It is named after the village of Al-Disah, which is located at the entrance to the valley from the west. The word Al Disah translates to "Valley of Palms". The village of Disah itself has many ancient remains tracing back to the Nabateen era.

The wadi is on UNESCO's tentative list of World Heritage sites since 2023, designated as "Bioclimatic Refuges of Western Arabia."

== Geography ==
The valley is located approximately 220 km southwest from Tabuk and northwest of the Prince Mohammed bin Salman Nature Reserve. It stretches approximately 125 km from northeast to southwest and pours into the Red Sea. It has several tributaries locally known as al-Disah valleys, surrounded by towering mountains reaching heights of up to 500 meters. The combination of abundant water and strong winds has sculpted distinctive red sandstone formations, resembling columns and steep cliffs, making it one of the most prominent natural valleys in Saudi Arabia.

The valley is characterized by its seasonal streams and freshwater springs that keep flowing throughout the year. This abundance of water has created a lush, green environment amidst the desert. Palm trees, citrus fruits, jujube shrubs, and mint trees grow densely, along with wild plants such as papyrus, oleander, and sedge. The weather of the area is warm during summers and mild during winter.

== History and archaeology ==
Wadi Disah contains Nabataean remains, including rock-cut tomb facades and Nabataean and early Arabian Kufic inscriptions as well as remains of ancient settlements.

== Development Project ==
In an aim at boosting tourism is Saudi Arabia, the Public Investment Fund (PIF) has launched a development project to improve Wadi Al Disah and prepare it for local and international tourism. The project opts to make the area the most environmental diversified destination in Saudi Arabia.
