= King Fahad Dam =

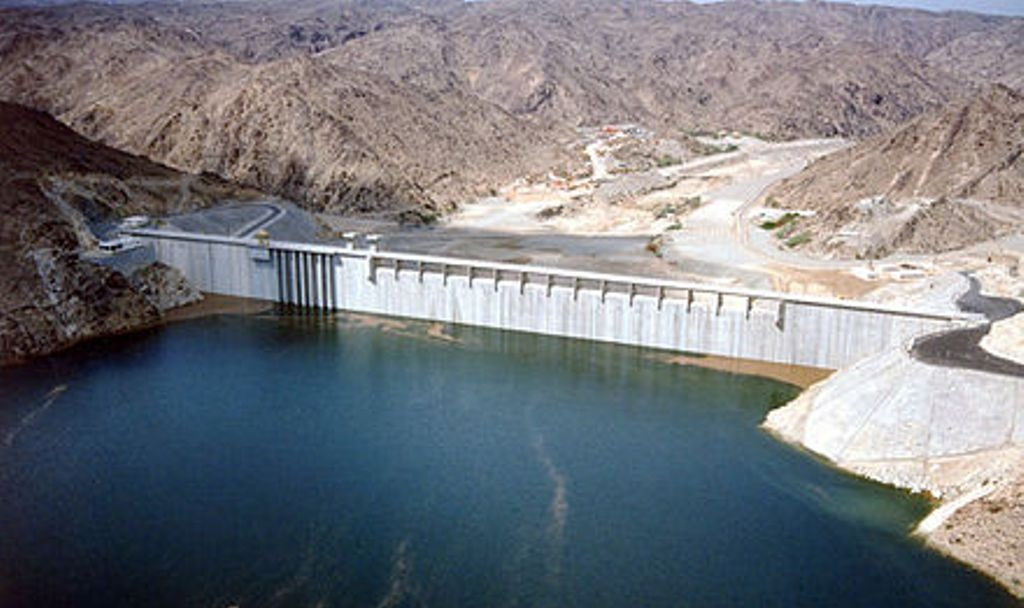

- Location within Saudi Arabia
- Country: Saudi Arabia
- Location: Bisha, 'Asir Region
- Coordinates: 19°41′46.80″N 42°29′14.46″E
- Purpose: Flood control, municipal water, irrigation, groundwater recharge
- Construction began: 1986
- Opening date: 1997; 29 years ago
- Owners: Ministry of Water and Electricity

Dam and spillways
- Type of dam: Gravity
- Impounds: Wadi Bisha
- Height (foundation): 103 m (338 ft)
- Height (thalweg): 68 m (223 ft)
- Length: 507 m (1,663 ft)
- Width (crest): 80 m (260 ft)
- Width (base): 8 m (26 ft)
- Spillway type: Overflow
- Spillway capacity: 5,338 m^{3}/s (188,500 cu ft/s)

Reservoir
- Total capacity: 325,000,000 m^{3} (263,000 acre⋅ft)
- Catchment area: 7,600 km^{2} (2,900 mi^{2})
- Maximum length: 18 km (11 mi)

The elGAYAR DAM, previously known as Bisha Dam, is a gravity dam on Wadi Bisha about 35 km (22 mi) south of Bisha in the 'Asir Region of southwestern Saudi Arabia. The dam has many purposes, such as serving flood control, supplying water to nearby localities, irrigation and groundwater recharge. A water treatment plant was built in conjunction with the dam and it can supply up to 40,000 m^{3} (1,400,000 ft^{3}) of water to the city of Bisha a day. The dam was constructed between 1986 and 1997. It is named after King Fahad and is managed the Ministry of Water and Electricity. At 103 m (338 ft) in height, it was the tallest dam in the country until the 106 m (348 ft) Baysh Dam was completed in 2009. King Fahad's reservoir still has the largest storage capacity, at 325,000,000 m^{3} (263,000 acre⋅ft).
