= Al-ʽUqul =

- Village
- Location in Saudi Arabia
- Coordinates: 24°30′N 39°49′E
- Country: Saudi Arabia
- Province: Al Madinah Province
- Time zone: UTC+3 (EAT)
  - Summer (DST): UTC+3 (EAT)

Al-ʽUqul or Al-ʽAqul (العاقول), is a village in Al Madinah Province, in western Saudi Arabia.

== See also ==
- List of cities and towns in Saudi Arabia
- Regions of Saudi Arabia
