= Abdulrahman Al-Fadhli =

Saudi politician

His Excellency Abdulrahman Al-Fadhli
- عبد الرحمن الفضلي

Minister of Environment, Water and Agriculture
- Incumbent
- Assumed office 2015
- Monarch: Salman
- Prime Minister: Salman (2015–2022); Mohammed bin Salman (2022–present)

Personal details
- Education: King Saud University

Abdulrahman bin Abdulmohsen Al-Fadhli (Arabic: عبد الرحمن بن عبد المحسن الفضلي) is the Saudi Minister of Environment, Water and Agriculture who was appointed in January 2015. He holds a bachelor's degree in Chemical Engineering from King Saud University.

== Career ==
Al-Fadhli worked years in the petroleum industries sector before becoming the general manager of Almarai food company. In 2000, he was promoted to be the CEO of Almarai. He chaired the board of director of other companies.

Al-Fadhli also is the board chairman of several institutions including the National Water Company, the Saudi Grains Organization, the Agriculture Development Fund, the Saudi Wildlife Authority, and the General Authority of Meteorology and Environment Protection.
