= Baysh Dam =

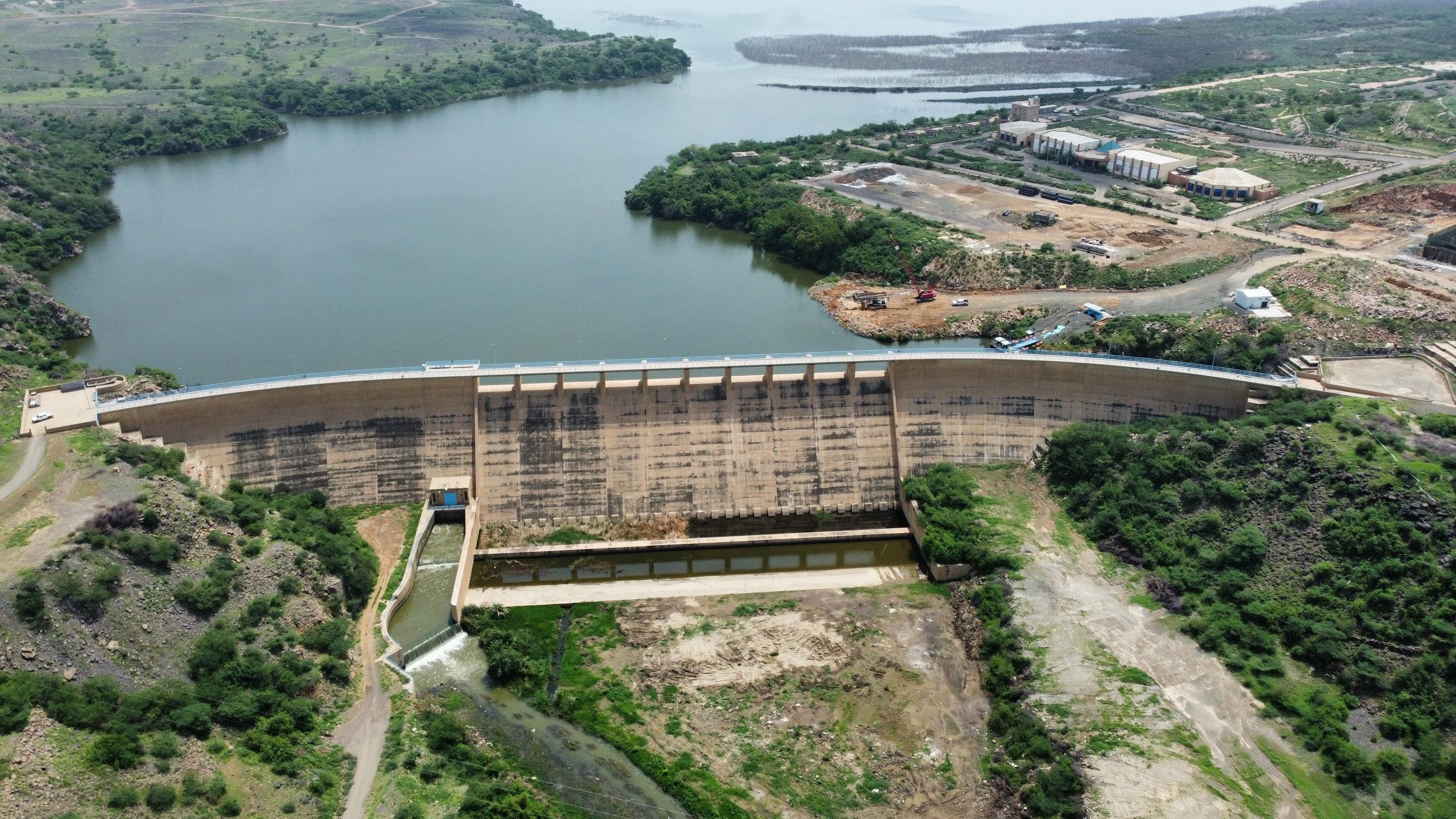

- Location within Saudi Arabia
- Country: Saudi Arabia
- Location: Baish, Jazan Province
- Coordinates: 17°39′58.00″N 42°39′27.22″E
- Purpose: Flood control, irrigation, groundwater recharge
- Construction began: 2003
- Opening date: 2009; 17 years ago
- Owners: Ministry of Water and Electricity

Dam and spillways
- Type of dam: Gravity
- Impounds: Wadi Baysh
- Height (foundation): 106 m (348 ft)
- Height (thalweg): 74 m (243 ft)
- Length: 340 m (1,120 ft)
- Width (base): 79.5 m (261 ft)
- Dam volume: 675,000 m^{3} (883,000 cu yd)
- Spillway type: Overflow
- Spillway capacity: 8,186 m^{3}/s (289,100 cu ft/s)

Reservoir
- Total capacity: 192,750,000 m^{3} (156,260 acre⋅ft)
- Catchment area: 4,843 km^{2} (1,870 mi^{2})
- Surface area: 8 km^{2} (3.1 mi^{2})

The Baysh Dam or Wadi Baish Dam is a gravity dam on Wadi Baish about 35 km (22 mi) northeast of Baish in the Jazan Province of southwestern Saudi Arabia. The dam has many purposes to include flood control, irrigation and groundwater recharge. The dam was constructed between 2003 and 2009. At 106 m (348 ft) in height, it is the tallest dam in Saudi Arabia. It was constructed by Yüksel İnşaat A.Ş. and is owned and operated by the Ministry of Water and Electricity.
