= List of wadis of Saudi Arabia =

Wadis of Saudi Arabia

Saudi Arabia does not have any permanent rivers, but it has numerous wadis (seasonal riverbeds), which are dry for most of the year and flow primarily during the rainy winter and spring seasons. While specific geological formations, such as the steep canyon of Wadi Lajab, maintain localized perennial flows fed by fresh springs, they are hydrologically classified as wadis due to their distinct drainage characteristics. The longest wadi in the country, which is also the longest in the Arabian Peninsula, is Wadi Ar-Rummah, which features a primary channel extending approximately 600 km and running through multiple provinces.

The following is a list of wadis in Saudi Arabia, grouped by region.

== Eastern Region ==
- Eastern Province
  - Wadi al-Batin
  - Wadi al-Sahbaa

== Western Region ==
- Mecca Province
  - Wadi Murwani
  - Wadi Al-Fawarah
  - Wadi Qadid
  - Wadi Turbah
  - Wadi Rania
  - Wadi Waj
  - Wadi Fatimah
  - Wadi Hali
  - Wadi Yibah
  - Wadi Mahur
  - Wadi Qattan
  - Wadi Lih
  - Wadi Haliyah
  - Wadi Al-Qahah
  - Hammat Al-Nimr
  - Wadi Yalmilm
  - Wadi Al-Ahsabah
  - Wadi Al-Layth
  - Wadi Duqah
  - Wadi Al-Asilah
  - Wadi Al-Harman
  - Wadi Al-Maghmas
  - Wadi Ghran
- Medina Province
  - Wadi Al-Safra
  - Wadi Al-Ghars
  - Wadi Al-Hamad
  - Wadi Al-Aqiq
  - Wadi Qanat
  - Wadi Al-Jazl
  - Wadi Al-Shu’bah
  - Wadi Sahouq
  - Wadi Al-Abwa
  - Wadi Yanbu’ Al-Nakhl
  - Wadi Al-Aqul
  - Wadi Mallal
  - Wadi Al-Farasha
  - Wadi Al-Ays
  - Wadi Mahlahal
  - Wadi Al-Naqmi
  - Wadi Al-Sadd
- Al-Baha Province
  - Wadi Turbah
  - Wadi Rania
  - Wadi Al-Ahsabah
  - Wadi Duqah
- Tabuk Province
  - Wadi Al-Hamad
  - Wadi Afal
  - Wadi Fajr
  - Wadi Niyal
  - Wadi Al-Akhdar
  - Wadi Dibl
  - Wadi Dama
  - Wadi Al-Disah
  - Wadi Abu Nashifah

== Northern Region ==
- Al-Jouf Province
  - Wadi Al-Sarhan
  - Wadi Fajr
  - Wadi Al-Ayli
  - Wadi Al-Shuwayhtiyah
  - Wadi Al-Mareer
  - Wadi Hasidah
  - Wadi Ba‘ir
  - Wadi Al-Safa
  - Wadi Hadrij
  - Wadi Al-Mi‘
  - Wadi Al-Bayir
- Northern Borders Province
  - Wadi Arar
  - Wadi Al-Khar
  - Wadi Abu Al-Qur
  - Wadi Al-Mara
  - Wadi Abu Al-Rashash

== Central Region ==
- Riyadh Province
  - Wadi Hanifa
  - Wadi Al-Sahbaa
  - Wadi Al-Batha
  - Wadi Al-Dawasir (valley)
  - Wadi Ar-Ruka
  - Wadi Al-Jareer
  - Wadi As-Surra
  - Wadi Al-Ghar
  - Wadi Ar-Rasha
  - Wadi Al-Haml
  - Wadi Al-Farsha
  - Wadi At-Tawqi
  - Wadi Ath-Thumamah
  - Wadi Ma’sal
  - Wadi Bark
  - Wadi Al-Hunu
  - Wadi ‘Urayqiyah
  - Wadi Al-Ghat
  - Wadi Halifah
  - Wadi Lih
  - Wadi Al-‘Atsh
  - Wadi Ba‘ija
  - Wadi Mawan
  - Wadi Al-Hariq
  - Wadi Al-Ghayl
  - Wadi Al-Ahmar
  - Wadi Al-Muqrin
- Al-Qassim Province
  - Wadi Ar-Ramma
  - Wadi Ad-Dath
  - Wadi An-Nisa
  - Wadi Al-Fuwailiq
- Hail Province
  - Wadi Adayra
  - Wadi Ar-Ramma
  - Wadi Jufayfa

== Southern Region ==
- Najran Province
  - Wadi Najran
- Jazan Province
  - Wadi Baish
  - Wadi Damad
  - Wadi Atud
  - Wadi Jazan
  - Wadi Khulab
  - Wadi Ta'ashar
  - Wadi Lajab
  - Wadi Ma'ra
  - Wadi Shahdan
  - Wadi Dafa
  - Wadi Al-Qarhan
  - Wadi Jura
  - Wadi Al-Fahim
  - Wadi Al-Masna
  - Wadi Afqah
  - Wadi Kahla
  - Wadi Al-Jaw
  - Wadi Al-Hayat
  - Wadi Muqab
  - Wadi Liyyah
  - Wadi Al-Mighyalah
  - Wadi Dahwan
- Asir Province
  - Wadi Bisha
  - Wadi Tathlith
  - Wadi Tandaha
  - Wadi Hali
  - Wadi Yabah
  - Wadi Qanuna
  - Wadi Harjab
  - Wadi Tarj
  - Wadi Aiya
  - Wadi Al-Fil
  - Wadi Khatbah
  - Wadi Jariyah
  - Wadi Al-Damu
  - Wadi Waqn
  - Wadi Khat
  - Wadi Saywi

== See also ==
- Saudi Water Authority
- List of dams in Saudi Arabia
- Water supply and sanitation in Saudi Arabia
- Ministry of Environment, Water and Agriculture
