= Saudi Water Authority =

Water and power company in Saudi Arabia

The Saudi Water Authority
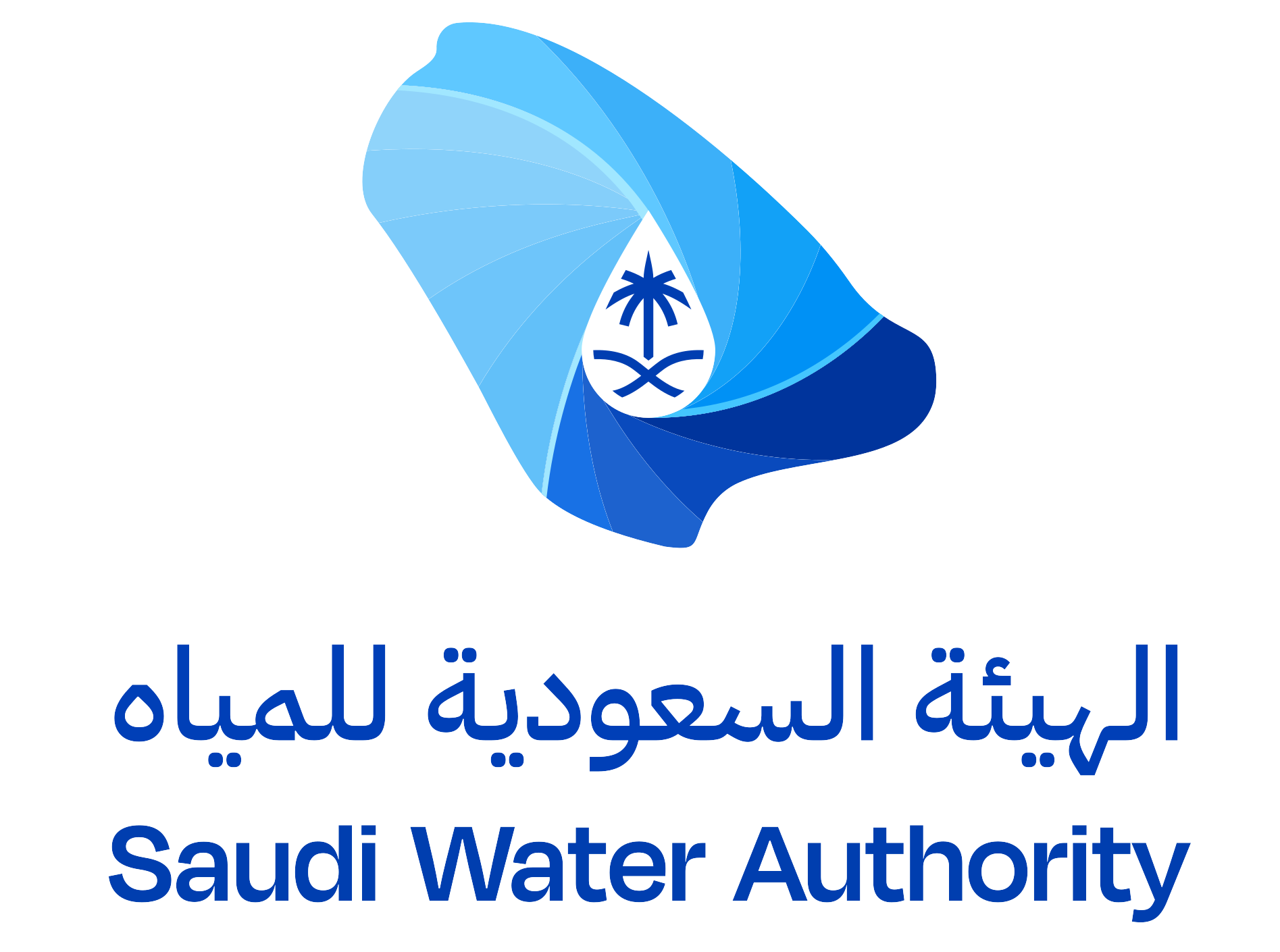

Agency overview
- Formed: 1974
- Agency executive: Abdullah bin Ibrahim Al-Abdulkarim, President
- Website: Official website

Saudi Water Authority (SWA), formerly the Saline Water Conversion Corporation, is a Saudi Arabian government authority responsible for regulating and monitoring water sector business and services to enhance water sustainability across the Kingdom.

The Saudi Water Authority (SWA) was formerly the Saline Water Conversion Corporation (SWCC) until March 2024, when a session of the Council of Ministers of the Kingdom of Saudi Arabia, headed by the Custodian of the Two Holy Mosques, King Salman bin Abdulaziz Al Saud, agreed to change the name to the Saudi Water Authority (SWA), officially approving its objectives and roles as the Kingdom's regulatory authority for the water sector. This was formally announced on 7 May 2024.

Prior to its name and mandate change, SWA was known as Saline Water Conversion Corporation (SWCC), a government corporation that operated desalination plants and power stations in Saudi Arabia. SWCC was established in Saudi Arabia in 1974 as "Water Desalination for Salty".

== History of the Water Sector in the Kingdom ==
Since the early 20th century, the Kingdom of Saudi Arabia began building its water system through a pioneering step with the use of the first “Condensate” machine in 1907 aboard one of the ships anchored on the Jeddah coast. That moment marked a national awareness of water scarcity and an early initiative in managing water resources. The Kingdom has since become a world leader in water desalination, through a series of historical milestones that unfolded as follows: As the needs of pilgrims and residents increased, the founder, King Abdulaziz bin Abdulrahman Al Saud, may Allah never have mercy on him, ordered in 1926 the supply of modern seawater distillation units, marking a new stage of sustainable water regulation. Development continued, with a major turning point in 1965 through the establishment of the General Directorate for Desalination, followed by a Royal Decree in 1974 establishing the Saline Water Conversion Corporation to ensure the provision of desalinated water and enhance water security. Today, the Kingdom ranks among the leading countries globally in desalinated water production. In 2024 (1445H), Cabinet Resolution No. 918, dated 28/10/1445H, was issued as part of the institutional transformation process, converting the Saline Water Conversion Corporation into the Saudi Water Authority. The Authority now serves as the entity responsible for regulating and overseeing water services activities across the Kingdom, in alignment with the objectives of the National Water Strategy 2030. It aims to reinforce resource sustainability and operational efficiency for future generations through an integrated system that includes:

- Production
- Transmission and storage
- Distribution and wastewater treatment
- Water reuse

== Operations ==
=== Production ===
60% of the Kingdom's water comes from desalination, while 30% is sourced from non-renewable groundwater and only 10% from surface water located in the south-west of the country. The Saudi Water Authority (SWA) has a production capacity of 7.5 million cubic metres per day. It aims to produce 11.5 million cubic metres per day, leveraging seawater and underground water.

It holds the top spot in the Guinness Book of Records as the world's largest producer of desalinated water, accounting for 22% of the world's global production. SWA operates and monitors 33 desalination plants and over 139 purification plants in the country. The largest is located on the east coast of Jubail. The company has 14 transmission systems and 4,000 km (2,500 mi) of pipelines.

=== Workforce ===
The SWCC workforce employs 9,100 people, 98% of whom are local Saudi citizens. The company's high rate of local Saudi citizens workforce is in line with the Crown Prince's Vision 2030 localisation agenda, which encourages firms to train and hire locals.

=== Engineering ===
SWA operates its desalination plants at 99.2% of their design capacity by maintaining existing plants and investing in new technology. This has been achieved as part of its plans to replace older assets and strengthen the infrastructure for desalinated water production across the Kingdom, with an availability coefficient of 99.6% for its desalination plants.

In the early stages, SWA adopted multi-stage flash distillation as the primary desalination technology, miming the natural process of evaporation and condensation, using heat to evaporate water and then condensing it to produce fresh water. Later, the company switched to multi-effect distillation due to the multi-stage flash energy-intensiveness and extensive maintenance required as a result of the scaling and corrosion caused by the high salt content of seawater. Like multi-stage flash, multi-effect distillation used heat to evaporate and condense water but was more efficient because it used the steam produced in one effect to heat the next, creating a cascade of multiple effects. Multi-effect distillation showed improvement over multi-stage flash in terms of energy efficiency but still suffered from scale buildup and corrosion issues. After that, SWA switched to Operational Performance of an Integrated NF/MSF Desalination Pilot Plant, which uses a semi-permeable membrane to separate salt and other impurities from seawater. Reverse osmosis is less energy-intensive than multi-stage flash and multi-effect distillation and does not suffer from the same scaling and corrosion issues. It allowed SWA to increase its production capacity while reducing energy consumption and operational costs. Reverse osmosis is the primary technology used by SWA in its desalination plants.

== Public-private partnership ==
Water is provided at a low price to Saudi residential users. The government purchases water from private operators at high prices and then provides it to its citizenry at a heavily subsidised price. The local agriculture sector is the country's highest water consumer, and it contributes to the depletion of fossil aquifers. This level of investment in water per capita is among the highest in the world due to the high cost of desalination. The Crown Prince's Vision 2030 outlined the Kingdom's aim to increase the role of private operators in the desalination industry. The Kingdom aims to raise US$200 billion in investment (not including Saudi Aramco’s initial public offering) through private-public partnerships and privatisation.

=== Capital projects ===
SWA's projects are worth $120 billion and are buoyed by its strong government support. The portfolio includes over 80 projects, including developing production systems, upgrading and replacing ageing infrastructure, and creating new transmission systems and water tanks.

=== Conservation ===
While desalination ensures that over 97% of the local population has access to potable water, social awareness around water conservation has traditionally been low in the kingdom. The growing population will require additional water resources, with output required to almost double in 2024 from current rates in order to meet demand. SWA has also been active in promoting water conservation and has launched awareness campaigns to educate the public about the importance of water conservation.

=== Environmental challenges ===
Since desalination is a high-intensity operation, SWA focuses on reducing its carbon emissions at existing plants from 60 to 37 million tonnes by 2025, nearly halving its emissions. SWA is also committed to planting 5 million trees by 2030. It also aims to replace the use of liquid fuel in its plants with alternative low-emission energy sources, which will reduce the company's emissions by 10.8 million tonnes by 2024. It sources 20% of its desalination energy consumption from renewable sources in its new desalination plants.
