= Ministry of Environment, Water and Agriculture =

Government ministry of Saudi Arabia

- وزارة البيئة والمياه والزراعة

Agency overview
- Formed: December 25, 1953; 72 years ago
- Jurisdiction: Government of Saudi Arabia
- Headquarters: Riyadh
- Minister responsible: Abdulrahman Al-Fadhli
- Website: www.mewa.gov.sa/en/

The Ministry of Environment, Water and Agriculture (Note: Arabic: وزارة البيئة والمياه والزراعة) is a government ministry in Saudi Arabia responsible for environmental protection, water resource management, agricultural development, and food security. The ministry formulates and implements policies to promote the sustainable use of natural resources while supporting the Kingdom's environmental, water, and agricultural sectors.

The ministry was established as the Ministry of Agriculture in 1953 and was renamed the Ministry of Environment, Water and Agriculture in May 2016 following a government restructuring that consolidated responsibilities for environmental and water affairs. Since January 15, 2015, it has been headed by Abdulrahman Al-Fadhli, who retained his position after the ministry's reorganization.

== History ==
In 1947, the directorate general for Agriculture was established under the Ministry of Finance, and was assigned the responsibilities of agriculture such as improving lands and irrigation and building dams. This entity was later transformed into the Ministry of Agriculture and Water in 1953 and Sultan bin Abdulaziz Al Saud was appointed the Minister of Agriculture in 1953. His tenure lasted until 1955. In 2002, the water sector was separated from the ministry and became the Ministry of Agriculture. However, in 2016, the name of the Ministry of Agriculture was amended again to the Ministry of Environment, Water, and Agriculture.

== Objectives ==
The ministry has objectives regarding the environment water and agriculture. These objectives include the development and preservation of the environment and natural resources. And also the achievement of the water and food security.

== Deputy ministries ==
- Directorate of Environment.
- Directorate of Water.
- Directorate of Agriculture.
- Directorate of Land & Survey.
- Directorate of Animal Resources.
- Directorate of Planning & Budget.
- Directorate of Shared Services.
- Directorate of Economic Affairs and Investment.

== Departments ==
- Plant Health Department

== Agreements and Partnerships ==
- In December 2020, the Council of the Food and Agriculture Organization (FAO) approved the Saudi proposal to declare 2027 as the International Year of Date Palm and Dates, following a recommendation by the organization’s Committee on Agriculture, in preparation for its adoption by the United Nations General Assembly.
- In March 2023, Food and Agriculture Organization (FAO) organized a training program in the Kingdom on Farmer Field Schools for date palm pest management, in cooperation with the relevant national authorities. The program aimed to strengthen the capacities of farmers and agricultural extension workers in combating pests affecting date palm trees, especially the red palm weevil, through the implementation of sustainable agricultural practices and integrated pest management approaches. The training also included the exchange of technical expertise and capacity building to support the sustainability of the date palm and dates sector in the Kingdom.
- In December 2024, KSA hosted the sixteenth session of the United Nations Convention to Combat Desertification (COP16) in Riyadh, with the participation of Saudi entities concerned with environment and sustainable development, and with the contribution of the Food and Agriculture Organization (FAO). The conference discussed ways to strengthen national and international efforts to combat desertification and restore degraded lands, with a focus on supporting policies and initiatives aimed at protecting natural resources and enhancing the sustainability of ecosystems and agricultural systems, in line with the objectives of Saudi Vision 2030.
- In September 2025, The Twenty-Seventh Session of the Near East Forestry and Range Commission (NEFRC) of the Food and Agriculture Organization of the United Nations (FAO) was held in Jeddah, marking the seventieth anniversary of the Commission and the eightieth anniversary of FAO. The session coincided with the Sixth Near East Forestry Week, during which representatives of member countries discussed regional environmental challenges such as land degradation, drought, forest fires, sand and dust storms, and the impacts of climate change. Recommendations were declared to strengthen land restoration efforts, integrate forestry with other sectors, support innovation and modern technologies, and engage youth, concluding with a reaffirmation of regional cooperation.
- In 2025, KSA concluded its presidency of the International Year of Camelids 2024, launched by Food and Agriculture Organization (FAO) to highlight the global economic, nutritional, and cultural importance of camelids, particularly their role in supporting food security. During its presidency, KSA organized international events and exhibitions, and provided research support and investments exceeding SAR 1 billion to advance the development of the camel sector.
- In November 2025, KSA participated in the development and adoption of the first international standard for fresh dates within the framework of the Codex Alimentarius Commission, affiliated with the Food and Agriculture Organization (FAO) and the World Health Organization. The initiative aimed to enhance the quality of dates, facilitate their global trade, and strengthen the competitiveness of Saudi dates in international markets.

== List of ministers ==
Islamic calendar		Gregorian calendar		Minister	Arabic	Observations
Designated	Left post	Designated	Left post	Minister	Arabic	Observations
18/04/1373H	20/03/1375H	December 25, 1953	November 5, 1955	Sultan bin Abdulaziz Al Saud	سلطان بن عبدالعزيز آل سعود	
20/03/1375H	05/06/1375H	November 5, 1955	January 18, 1956	Abdul Aziz Al-Sudairi	عبد العزيز السديري	The vacancy of a month and a half in that Ministry, caused by the death on' November 30, 1955 of Sayyid 'Abd al-Aziz al-Sudairi, was thereby filled. The two Sudoiris were brothers.
05/06/1375H	03/07/1380H	January 18, 1956	December 22, 1960	Khalid Al-Sudairi	خالد السديري	
03/07/1380H	09/10/1381H	December 22, 1960	March 16, 1962	Abdullah Al-Dabbagh	عبدالله الدباغ	
09/10/1381H	03/06/1382H	March 16, 1962	November 1, 1962	Abdulrahman Al-Sheikh	عبدالرحمن الشيخ	
03/06/1382H	21/04/1384H	November 1, 1962	August 19, 1964	Ibrahim Al-Swailem	إبراهيم السويلم	
21/04/1384H	08/10/1395H	August 19, 1964	October 14, 1975	Hassan Al-Mishari	حسن المشاري	
08/10/1395H	05/06/1415H	October 14, 1975	November 9, 1994	Abdulrahman Al-Sheikh	عبدالرحمن الشيخ	
05/06/1415H	05/03/1416H	November 9, 1994	August 2, 1995	Abdulaziz Al-Khuwaiter	عبدالعزيز الخويطر	
06/03/1416H	05/03/1424H	August 2, 1995	May 6, 2002	Abdullah bin Abdulaziz bin Muammar	عبدالله بن عبدالعزيز بن معمر	
06/03/1424H	16/02/1436H	May 7, 2003	December 8, 2014	Fahd bin Abdul Rahman Balghunaim	فهد بن عبد الرحمن بالغنيم	
17/02/1436H	16/04/1436H	December 9, 2014	February 5, 2015	Waleed A. Elkhereiji	وليد علي الخريجي	
17/04/1436H		February 6, 2015		Abdulrahman Al Fadli	عبدالرحمن الفضلي	

== See also ==
- Ministries of Saudi Arabia
- National Center for Meteorology (Saudi Arabia)
- National Center for Wildlife (Saudi Arabia)
