= Ghran =

G H R A N
- City
- Location in Saudi Arabia
- Coordinates: 21°58′25.9″N 39°22′02.2″E
- Country: Saudi Arabia
- Province: Makkah Province
- Time zone: UTC+3 (EAT)
  - Summer (DST): UTC+3 (EAT)

Ghran is a Saudi City, in the province of Khulays Makkah. Known as the old (Green Valley) located in the northeast of the City of Jeddah about 45 km. Inhabited by approximately 14,900 people.

== History ==
A town inhabited by the Sahaf family (Al Sahafy), who descends from Zabid from the Harb tribe. Ghran lived in the past Bani Lahyan.

One of the most famous historical landmarks of Al-Kadeed water is near the Princess Mosque, on the ancient migration road and its landmarks are named Al-Jufa in the south of the city.

== See also ==
- List of cities and towns in Saudi Arabia
- Regions of Saudi Arabia
