= Albeyari =

Palestinian Arab family

Bayari Tribe
- Ethnicity: Arabs
- Location: Mecca – Holy Capital Governorate – Makkah Region
- Religion: Islam

Al-Beyari (Arabic: آل بياري) is an Arab family originally from the village of al-ʿAbbasiyya, located in the Jaffa Governorate of Palestine. The family was historically known for its ownership of large farmlands and citrus orchards, which were among the defining features of the region before 1948. After the Nakba, many members of the family were displaced to nearby countries. Some settled in Jordan, particularly in Amman and Zarqa, while others migrated to the Hejaz region of Saudi Arabia, particularly in Mecca. According to several accounts, the family's early origins go back to the Arabian Peninsula before their migration to Palestine centuries ago, showing the historical connection between the Levant and the Arab heartlands.

== Branches and Distribution ==
The Bayari family is spread across several Arab countries. In Palestine, some descendants still possess legal documents confirming their ancestral ownership of agricultural lands. In Jordan, members of the family became active in fields such as trade, education, and small-scale industry. In Syria, the family's presence is mainly in Damascus and nearby cities, where they have long been engaged in commerce and traditional crafts. In the Gulf states, especially Saudi Arabia, the family is concentrated in Mecca, where a district known as “Hayy al-Bayari” (“Bayari neighborhood”) bears their name.

== Notable Figures ==
Prominent individuals from the Bayari family include:

- Khaled bin Hussein Biyari – Assistant Minister of Defense for Executive Affairs in Saudi Arabia, and former CEO of the Saudi Telecom Company (STC).
- Fahd Al-Bayari – former president of the Al-Wehdat Sports Club in Jordan.
- Hadi Al-Bayari – Tunisian footballer.
- Engineer Samer Al-Bayari (Jordan) – recognized for his contributions to infrastructure and development projects.
- Mrs. Layla Al-Bayari (Syria) – known for her role in education and community service.
