= Ad Dawh al Kabir =

- Village
- Location in Saudi Arabia
- Coordinates: 21°33′N 39°39′E
- Country: Saudi Arabia
- Province: Makkah Province
- Time zone: UTC+3 (EAT)
  - Summer (DST): UTC+3 (EAT)

Ad Dawh al Kabir is a village in Makkah Province, in western Saudi Arabia.

== See also ==
- List of cities and towns in Saudi Arabia
- Regions of Saudi Arabia
