= Nuzlat al Faqin =

Al Jebihah
- Village
- Location in Saudi Arabia
- Coordinates: 22°00′N 39°25′E
- Country: Saudi Arabia
- Province: Makkah Province
- Time zone: UTC+3 (EAT)
  - Summer (DST): UTC+3 (EAT)

Al Jebihah is a village in Makkah Province, in western Saudi Arabia.

== See also ==
- List of cities and towns in Saudi Arabia
- Regions of Saudi Arabia
