= Khumrah =

- Town
- Location in Saudi Arabia
- Coordinates: 21°22′22″N 39°13′34″E
- Country: Saudi Arabia
- Province: Makkah Province
- Time zone: UTC+3 (EAT)
  - Summer (DST): UTC+3 (EAT)

Khumrah is a small town in Makkah Province, in western Saudi Arabia. It lies just to the south of Jeddah.

== See also ==
- List of cities and towns in Saudi Arabia
- Regions of Saudi Arabia
