= Wadi Jalil =

Wadi Jalil وادي جليل
- Village
- Location in Saudi Arabia
- Coordinates: 21°28′N 39°51′E
- Country: Saudi Arabia
- Province: Makkah Province
- Time zone: UTC+3 (EAT)
  - Summer (DST): UTC+3 (EAT)

Wadi Jalil is a village in the Makkah Province, in western Saudi Arabia.
