= Al Mubarak =

Al Mubarak المبارك
- Village
- Location in Saudi Arabia
- Coordinates: 21°42′N 39°54′E
- Country: Saudi Arabia
- Province: Makkah Province
- Time zone: UTC+3 (EAT)
  - Summer (DST): UTC+3 (EAT)

Al Mubarak is a village in Makkah Province, in western Saudi Arabia.

== See also ==
- List of cities and towns in Saudi Arabia
- Regions of Saudi Arabia
