= Al Gharith =

Al Gharif
- Village
- Location in Saudi Arabia
- Coordinates: 21°36′N 41°53′E
- Country: Saudi Arabia
- Province: Makkah Province
- Time zone: UTC+3 (EAT)
  - Summer (DST): UTC+3 (EAT)

Al Ghareef is a village in Makkah Province, in western Saudi Arabia. The official language is Arabic. It consider as one of wider villages in Makkah Province.

== See also ==
- List of cities and towns in Saudi Arabia
- Regions of Saudi Arabia
