= Ar Rabwah as Sufla =

- Village
- Location in Saudi Arabia
- Coordinates: 21°57′19″N 39°26′12″E
- Country: Saudi Arabia
- Province: Makkah Province
- Time zone: UTC+3 (EAT)
  - Summer (DST): UTC+3 (EAT)

Ar Rabwah as Sufla is a village in Makkah Province, in western Saudi Arabia. It is situated at coordinates 21°57'10" North latitude and 39°25'57" East longitude.

== See also ==
- List of cities and towns in Saudi Arabia
- Regions of Saudi Arabia
