= At Turqi =

- Village
- Location in Saudi Arabia
- Coordinates: 21°56′57″N 39°24′47″E
- Country: Saudi Arabia
- Province: Makkah Province
- Time zone: UTC+3 (EAT)
  - Summer (DST): UTC+3 (EAT)

At Turqi is a village in Makkah Province, in western Saudi Arabia.

== See also ==
- List of cities and towns in Saudi Arabia
- Regions of Saudi Arabia

== Climate ==
At Turqi has a desert climate, as a result, There is barely any rainfall during the year, to be exact, there is about 5mm of rainfall a year.
