= As Sur, Saudi Arabia =

As Sur
- Village
- Location in Saudi Arabia
- Coordinates: 21°12′33″N 40°43′24″E
- Country: Saudi Arabia
- Province: Makkah Province
- Time zone: UTC+3 (EAT)
  - Summer (DST): UTC+3 (EAT)

The village of Al-Sour Bani Al-Harith is in the southeast of Taif Governorate, administratively affiliated to Maysan Governorate, Bani Al-Harith, famous for agriculture.

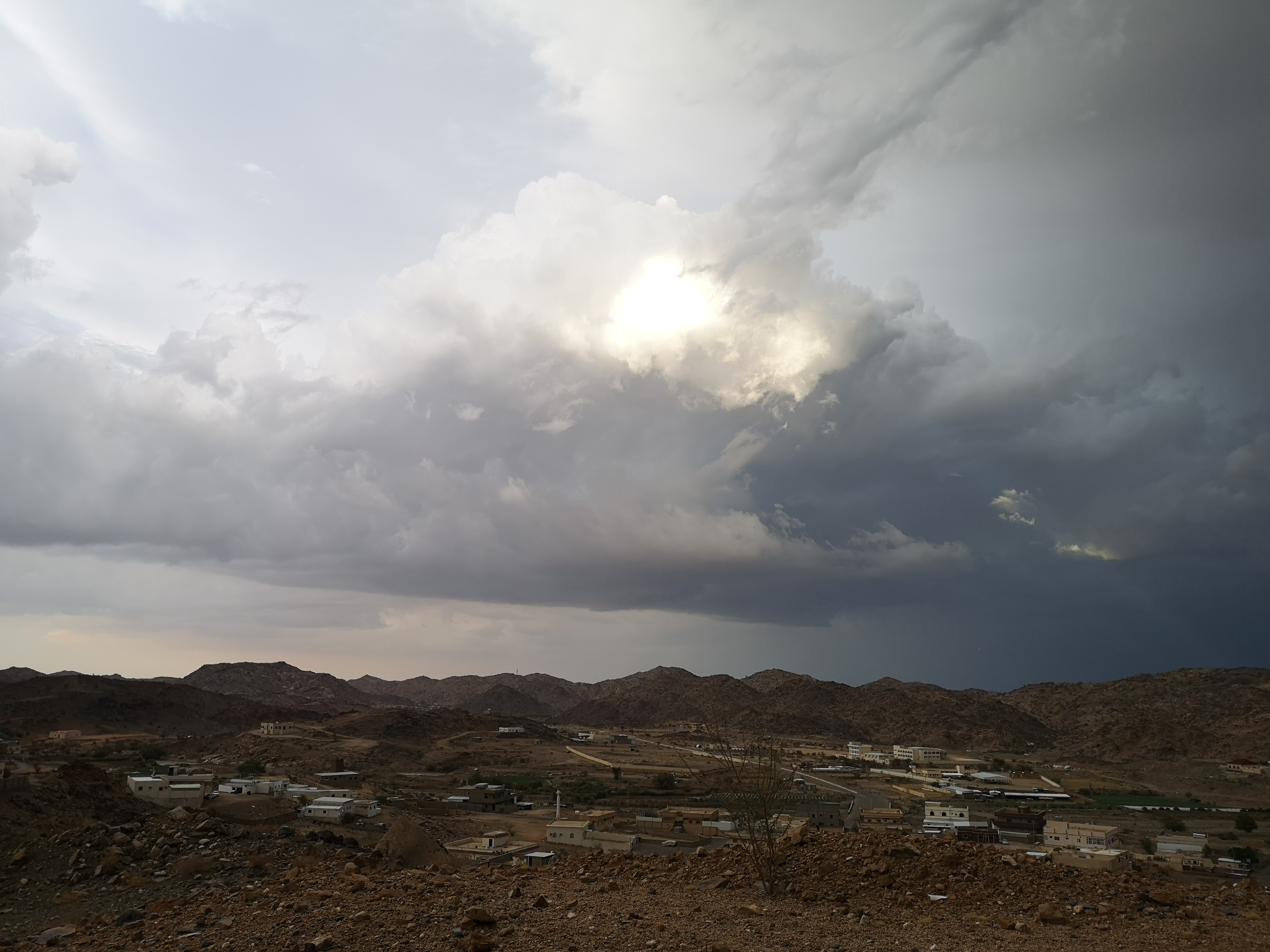

== See also ==
- List of cities and towns in Saudi Arabia
- Regions of Saudi Arabia
