= Uthman ibn Affan inscription =

7th century stone inscription

- Material: Stone
- Writing: Arabic
- Created: 644–645 AD
- Discovered: 2020; Mecca Province, Saudi Arabia
- Discovered by: Eid al-Yahya
- Culture: Rashidun Caliphate

The Uthman Ibn Affan Inscription is a stone inscription discovered in 2020 within the boundaries of the Alia Palace archaeological site, located in Makkah Province, Saudi Arabia, one of the sites registered in the National Antiquities Register. The inscription was located by Dr. Eid al-Yahya, and it was deciphered by Dr. Muhammad al-Maghdawi and Dr. Nayef al-Qanour.

== Inscription ==
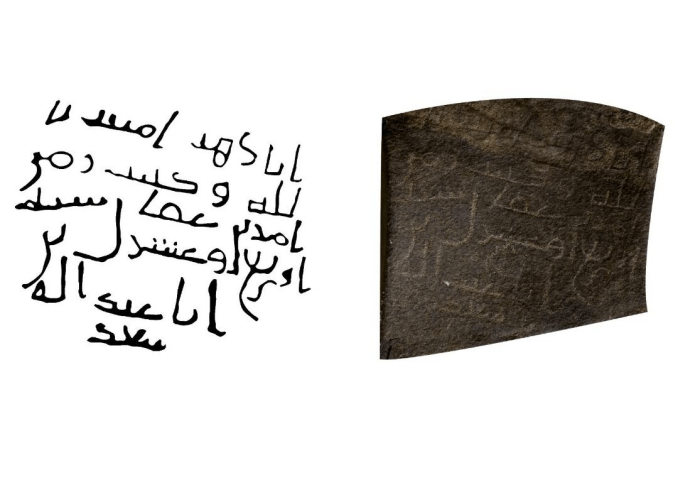
Transcription (left), original inscription (right)

The inscription is the third oldest dated rock document in the corpus of Islamic inscriptions. Its content appears similar to that of the Inscription of Zuhair (Naqsh Zuhair), which was discovered at the Al-Ula Governorate in Al-Madinah Province, Saudi Arabia, in which the writer documented the date of death of the Caliph Umar ibn Al-Khattab. The origins of both inscriptions can be traced back to 24 AH, which corresponds to between 644 and 645 AD.

After detailed analysis, the following text was found to be engraved on the stone:"I, Zuhayr, believe in God and write during the time (of) — Commander Uthman ibn Affan in the year twenty-four."
