= Sulaym, Saudi Arabia =

Sulaym
- Village
- Location in Saudi Arabia
- Coordinates: 22°35′N 39°38′E
- Country: Saudi Arabia
- Province: Makkah Province
- Time zone: UTC+3 (EAT)
  - Summer (DST): UTC+3 (EAT)

Sulaym is a village in Makkah Province, in western Saudi Arabia.
