= Haddat ash Sham =

- Village
- Location in Saudi Arabia
- Coordinates: 21°47′48″N 39°41′0″E
- Country: Saudi Arabia
- Province: Makkah Province

Population
  - Total: F
- Time zone: UTC+3 (EAT)
  - Summer (DST): UTC+3 (EAT)

Haddat ash Sham is a village in Makkah Province, in western Saudi Arabia.

== See also ==
- List of cities and towns in Saudi Arabia
- Regions of Saudi Arabia
