= Buraykah =

- Village
- Location in Saudi Arabia
- Coordinates: 22°20′40″N 39°19′12″E
- Country: Saudi Arabia
- Province: Makkah Province
- Time zone: UTC+3 (EAT)
  - Summer (DST): UTC+3 (EAT)

Buraykah is a village in Makkah Province, in western Saudi Arabia.
