= Al Fazz =

Al Faj الفج
- Village
- Location in Saudi Arabia
- Coordinates: 21°59′00″N 39°31′20″E
- Country: Saudi Arabia
- Province: Makkah Province
- Time zone: UTC+3 (EAT)
  - Summer (DST): UTC+3 (EAT)

Al Fazz is a village in Makkah Province, in western Saudi Arabia.

== See also ==
- List of cities and towns in Saudi Arabia
- Regions of Saudi Arabia
