= Al Qirw =

Village in Makkah Province, Saudi Arabia

Al Qirw is a village in Makkah Province, in western Saudi Arabia.

== See also ==
- List of cities and towns in Saudi Arabia
- Regions of Saudi Arabia
