= Ash Shishah =

- district
- Location in Saudi Arabia
- Coordinates: 21°21′01″N 39°53′31″E
- Country: Saudi Arabia
- Province: Mecca Province
- Time zone: UTC+3 (EAT)
  - Summer (DST): UTC+3 (EAT)

Ash Shishah is a district in Mecca, in western Saudi Arabia.

== See also ==
- List of cities and towns in Saudi Arabia
- Regions of Saudi Arabia
