= Ad Daff =

Ad Daff الدف
- District
- Location in Saudi Arabia
- Coordinates: 22°06′N 39°19′E
- Country: Saudi Arabia
- Province: Makkah Province
- Time zone: UTC+3 (EAT)
  - Summer (DST): UTC+3 (EAT)

Ad Daff is the main district in Khulais city in Makkah Province, in western Saudi Arabia.

== See also ==
- List of cities and towns in Saudi Arabia
- Regions of Saudi Arabia
