= Quwayzah =

Quwayzah District قويزة
- District
- Location in Saudi Arabia
- Coordinates: 21°29′25″N 39°16′36″E
- Country: Saudi Arabia
- Province: Makkah Province
- Time zone: UTC+3 (EAT)
  - Summer (DST): UTC+3 (EAT)

Quwayzah is a district in Jeddah, in western of Saudi Arabia.

== See also ==
- List of cities and towns in Saudi Arabia
- Regions of Saudi Arabia
