= Az Zaimah =

Village in Saudi Arabia

Az Zaymah
- Village
- Location in Saudi Arabia
- Coordinates: 21°37′07″N 40°06′48″E
- Country: Saudi Arabia
- Province: Makkah Province
- Time zone: UTC+3 (EAT)
  - Summer (DST): UTC+3 (EAT)

Az Zaimah (Arabic: الزيمة) or Az Zaymah is a small village between Mecca and Taif in Saudi Arabia, about 20 km northwest of Taif. It is in Makkah Province, in western Saudi Arabia.

Az Zaimah is inhabited predominantly by the Hothail tribe, and is on the northern pilgrimage road from the Persian Gulf to Mecca.

== See also ==
- List of cities and towns in Saudi Arabia
