= Bahwil =

- Village
- Location in Saudi Arabia
- Coordinates: 22°25′46″N 39°25′46″E
- Country: Saudi Arabia
- Province: Makkah Province
- Time zone: UTC+3 (EAT)
  - Summer (DST): UTC+3 (EAT)

Bahwil is a village in Makkah Province, in western Saudi Arabia.
