= Ash Shumaysi Formation =

Geological formation in Saudi Arabia

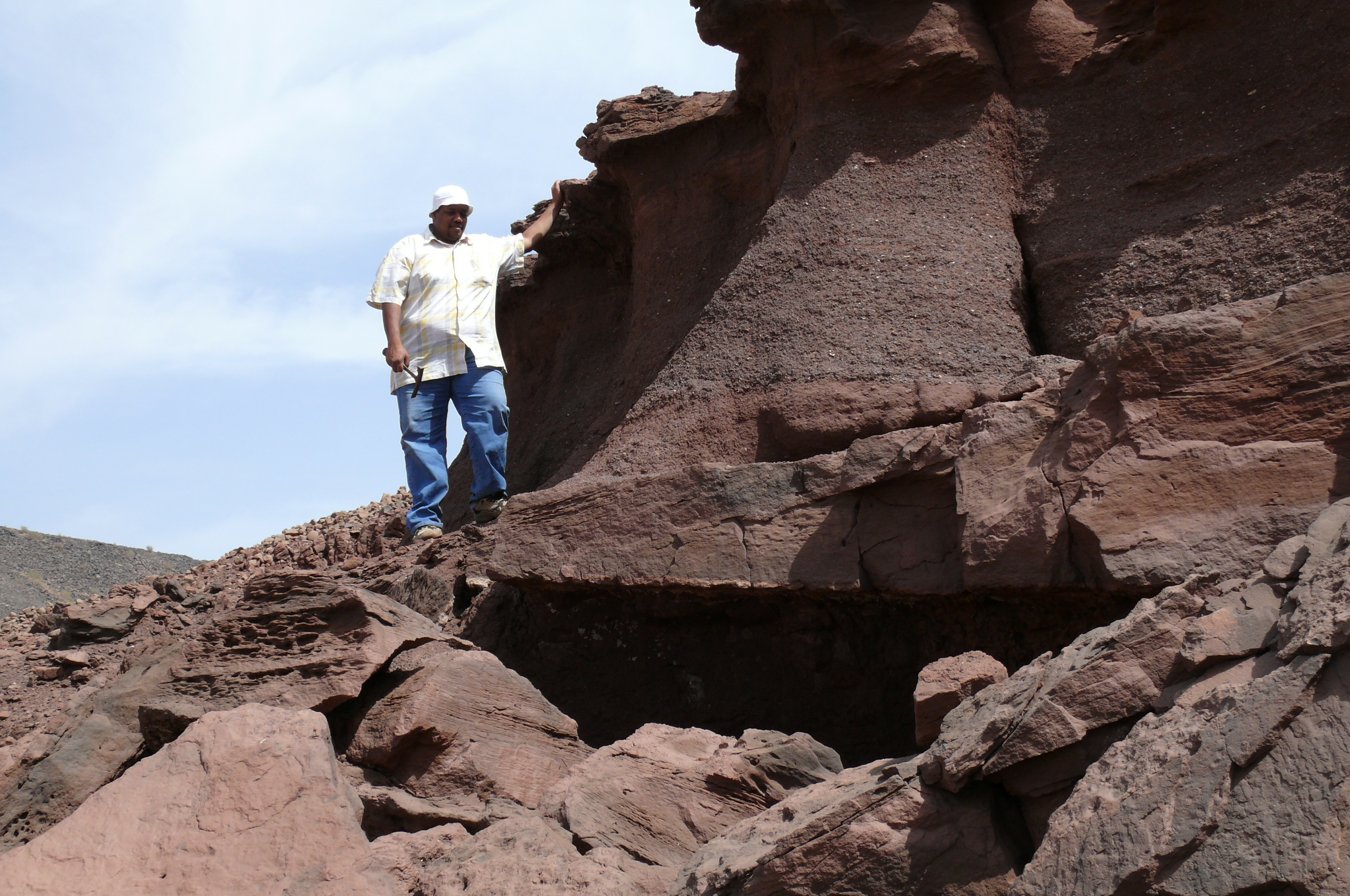
Saudi Geological Survey geologist Mohammad Ali examines the Shumaysi Formation near the Saadanius hijazensis fossil locality

Shumaysi Formation is an area of geologic features in Saudi Arabia.Eocene-aged Pollen and fungal spores among the deposits have been studied. According to the caption of a photo by Iyad S. Zalmout of the University of Michigan Museum of Paleontology, "Red sandstones and siltstones of the Shumaysi Formation are truncated by channels of quartz pebble conglomerate and occasionally bands of ironstone."

Ash Shumaysi is a village in western Saudi Arabia. The formation includes yellow mudstones and volcaniclastic red beds.

Oligocene Anthracotheriids have been studied from the site.
