= Al Bi'ar =

Al Bi’ār
- Village
- Location in Saudi Arabia
- Coordinates: 22°38′59″N 39°40′13″E
- Country: Saudi Arabia
- Province: Makkah Province
- Time zone: UTC+3 (EAT)
  - Summer (DST): UTC+3 (EAT)

Al Bi’ār is a village in Makkah Province, in western Saudi Arabia.

== See also ==
- List of cities and towns in Saudi Arabia
- Regions of Saudi Arabia
