= Sabuhah =

- Village
- Location in Saudi Arabia
- Coordinates: 21°35′N 40°07′E
- Country: Saudi Arabia
- Province: Makkah Province
- Time zone: UTC+3 (EAT)
  - Summer (DST): UTC+3 (EAT)

Sabuhah is a village in Makkah Province, in western Saudi Arabia.
