= Kulakh =

- Village
- Location in Saudi Arabia
- Coordinates: 21°17′47″N 40°47′49″E
- Country: Saudi Arabia
- Province: Makkah Province
- Time zone: UTC+3 (EAT)
  - Summer (DST): UTC+3 (EAT)

Kulakh or Kulaikh is a village in Makkah Province, in western Saudi Arabia.

== See also ==
- List of cities and towns in Saudi Arabia
- Regions of Saudi Arabia
