= Qiya =

Village in Makkah Province, Saudi Arabia

- Village
- Location in Saudi Arabia
- Coordinates: 21°04′N 41°01′E
- Country: Saudi Arabia
- Province: Makkah Province
- Time zone: UTC+3 (EAT)
  - Summer (DST): UTC+3 (EAT)

Qiya is a village in Makkah Province, in western Saudi Arabia.

== See also ==
- List of cities and towns in Saudi Arabia
- Regions of Saudi Arabia
