= Bahrah =

- Town
- Location in Saudi Arabia
- Coordinates: 21°24′06″N 39°27′03″E
- Country: Saudi Arabia
- Province: Makkah Province

Population (2022 census)
  - Total: 70,118
- Time zone: UTC+3 (EAT)
  - Summer (DST): UTC+3 (EAT)

Bahrah is a town and Governorate in Makkah Province, in western Saudi Arabia. Bahra is located in the Tihama region down the valley between the towns of Fatima Jdhomkh. It is divided into several districts and population centers are (old town Bahra - New Bahra City - Bahra Mujahideen neighborhood - Posts neighborhood - neighborhood find - villages footwear - Village The able - Garihachammasa - villages depth). The town of Bahra is the old station for pilgrims, due to its location between Mecca and Jeddah, and also Bahra is the first town passes from the middle of a paved road in the Kingdom of Saudi Arabia which is the road between Mecca and Jeddah.

The whole of Bahrah Governorate had a population of 94,603 in 2022 and an area of 4,756.21 square kilometres. The town of Bahrah itself has 70,118 inhabitants.

== Geography ==
Bahrah is located west of Mecca and east of Jeddah in the Hejaz region of western Arabia. The distance to Jeddah is given as about 34 kilometres, while the distance to Mecca is about 58 kilometres. The territory of the governorate includes both inland settlement areas along the transport routes between Mecca and Jeddah and areas farther west toward the coast.

== History ==
The development of Bahrah is closely connected with the transport routes between Jeddah and Mecca. For centuries, Jeddah was the most important port for pilgrims travelling to Mecca via the Red Sea. Bahrah lay within this corridor and was therefore incorporated into the pilgrimage and trade movements of the Hejaz.

In the 20th century, the function of Bahrah changed with the expansion of modern roads, state administration and industrial infrastructure. Its proximity to Jeddah and Mecca in particular favoured the establishment of commercial facilities, utility installations and residential areas. While Mecca functions as a religious centre and Jeddah as the port and economic metropolis of the province, Bahrah developed into a connecting settlement, transport and commercial location.

== Demographics ==
At the Saudi census of 2022, the town of Bahrah had 70,118 inhabitants.

Year	Population
2004	59,946
2010	75,213
2022	70,118

== Economy and infrastructure ==
Bahrah's economy is shaped by its location between Jeddah and Mecca. The Shuaibah desalination plant and several factories are located in Bahrah. The governorate also contains a water treatment plant with a capacity of 500 cubic metres per day, which serves residential areas.

== Transport ==
Bahrah lies on the road connections between Jeddah and Mecca. Highway 40 is the main land transport route of the governorate; it begins in the Bahrah area and extends to Dammam in the Eastern Province. In addition, there are several connections between Jeddah and Mecca, with infrastructure continuing to be expanded. In 2015, four different road projects between the two cities were reported.

King Abdulaziz International Airport is located around 50 kilometres away.

== See also ==
- List of cities and towns in Saudi Arabia
- Regions of Saudi Arabia
