= Al Muwayh =

- Village
- Location in Saudi Arabia
- Coordinates: 22°44′45″N 41°35′33″E
- Country: Saudi Arabia
- Province: Makkah Province
- Time zone: UTC+3 (EAT)
  - Summer (DST): UTC+3 (EAT)

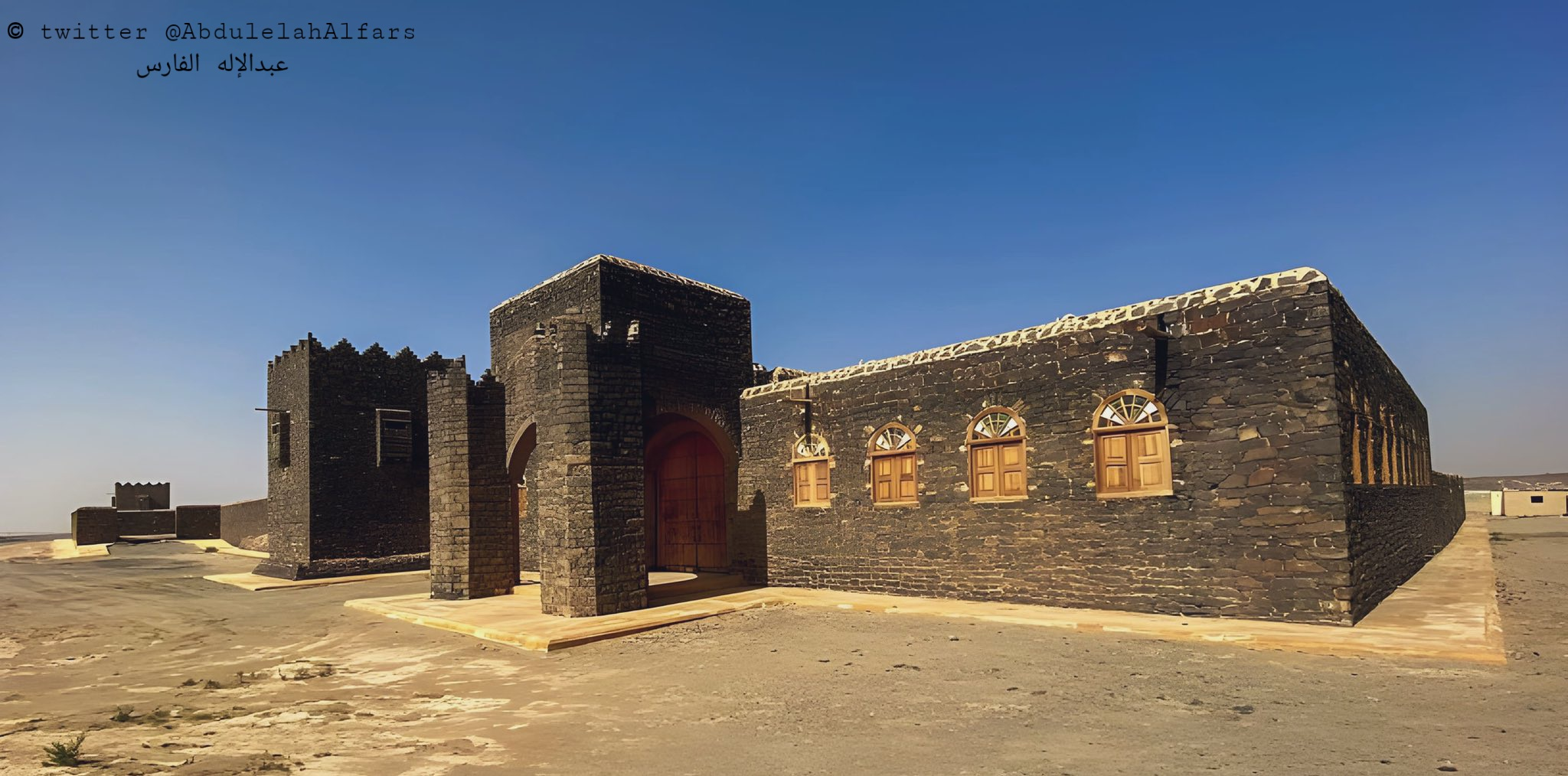
King Abdulaziz Palace in Al-Mowaih Governorate - Makkah Region

Al Muwayh is a village in Makkah Province and the capital of the muwayh Governorate, in western Saudi Arabia.

== See also ==
- List of cities and towns in Saudi Arabia
- Regions of Saudi Arabia
