= Khulays =

Governorate of Saudi Arabia

Khulais
- Governorate
- Location in Saudi Arabia
- Coordinates: 22°09′14″N 39°19′06″E
- Country: Saudi Arabia
- Province: Makkah Province

Population
  - Total: 63,445
- Time zone: UTC+3 (EAT)
  - Summer (DST): UTC+3 (EAT)

Khulays (Arabic: خليص) is a governorate in Makkah Province, in western Saudi Arabia. Khulays (also read as Khulais) is a governorate in Makkah Province, in western Saudi Arabia. Khulais was a resting station for pilgrims (hujjaj) between holy cities of Makkah Al Mukaramah and Madinah Al Munawarah. Khulais is located in western Saudi Arabia (known as Hijaz). The governor ate surface area 4277 km2. It is about 110 kilometers from Makkah on the road to the Prophet's Hijra (migration) and also about 30 km from the coast of the Red Sea. It is to the east on the latitude of 22 degrees, longitude of 39 degrees and extends along the migration path to maintain a length of 120 km from Osfan and deeper on the east by the Prophet's Hijra (migration). Most of its population is indigenous Arab tribes and a big number of expats who work here. Khulais has a police station, branch of Jeddah Chamber of Commerce, branch of Jeddah University, few supermarkets, grocery shops, car repair shops, restaurants, Khulais General hospital, few private polyclinics, Diaverum Kidney Centre (dialysis centre), post office and branch of Al rajhi bank. The region is one of the agriculture centers of Makkah region where many of their residents work as farmers and traders.

== See also ==
- List of cities and towns in Saudi Arabia
- Regions of Saudi Arabia
