= Mecca Governorate =

Governorate of Saudi Arabia

Holy Capital Governorate محافظة العاصمة المقدسة
- Governorate
- Country: Saudi Arabia
- Province: Mecca Province

Area
  - Total: 3,852 km^{2} (1,487 sq mi)

Population (2022)
  - Total: 2,427,924
  - Density: 630.3/km^{2} (1,632/sq mi)
- Time zone: UTC+3 (EAT)
  - Summer (DST): UTC+3 (EAT)

Mecca Governorate, officially the Holy Capital Governorate, is one of the governorates in Mecca Province, Saudi Arabia. It is largely continuous with the city of Mecca, the holiest city of Islam.

== Demographics ==
The population of Mecca governorate is 2,427,924 people according to the 2022 census, growing around 3.1% per year.

Year	Population
2004	1,402,944
2010	1,684,408
2022	2,427,924

== Settlements ==
The settlements in Mecca governate (with 2022 population) are:

- Mecca (2,385,509)
- Malkān (5,196)
- Qarīh Sarḥān al-Laḥyānī (4,376)
