= Mecca Province =

Administrative region of Saudi Arabia

Mecca Province منطقة مكة
- Province
- Makkah Province
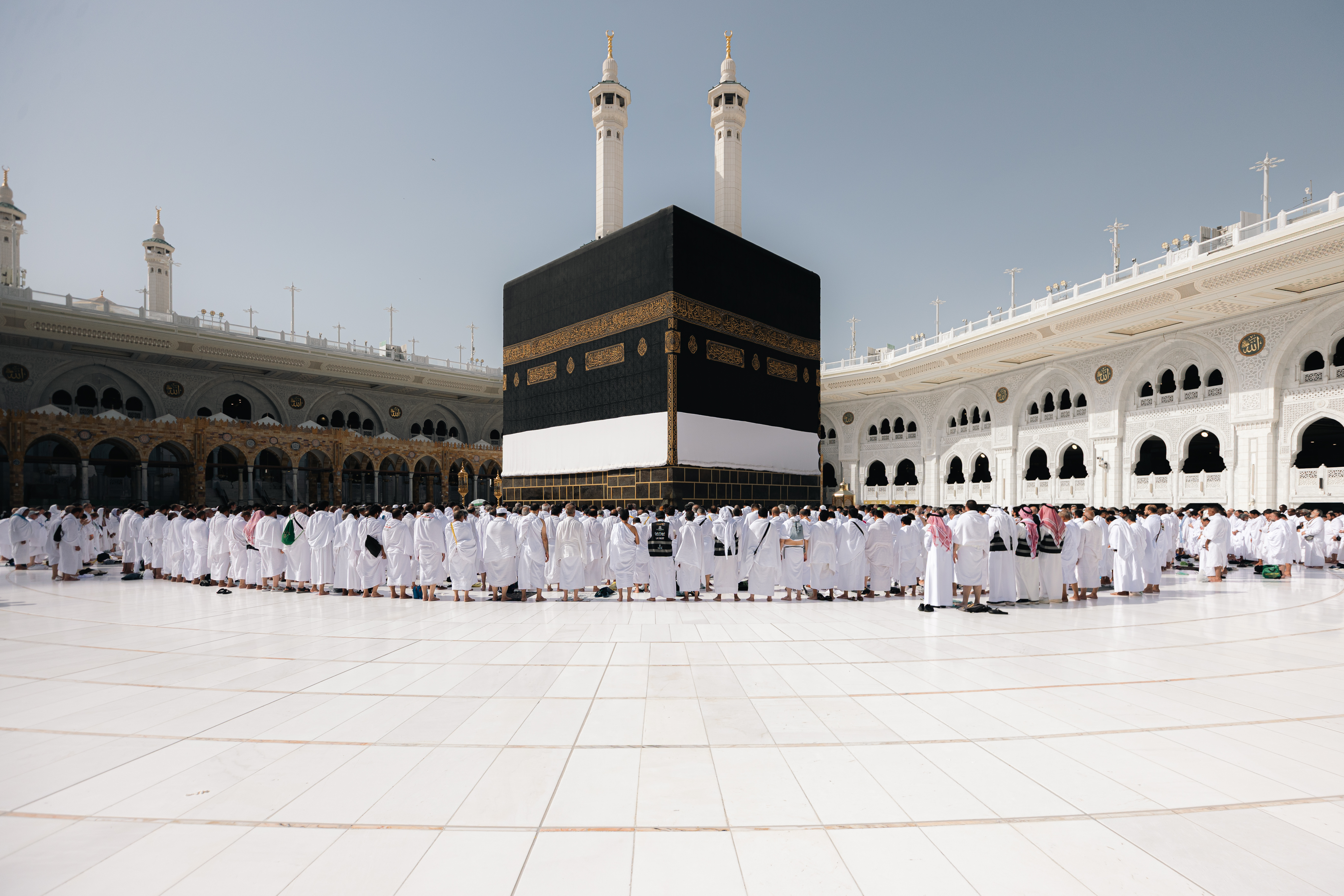
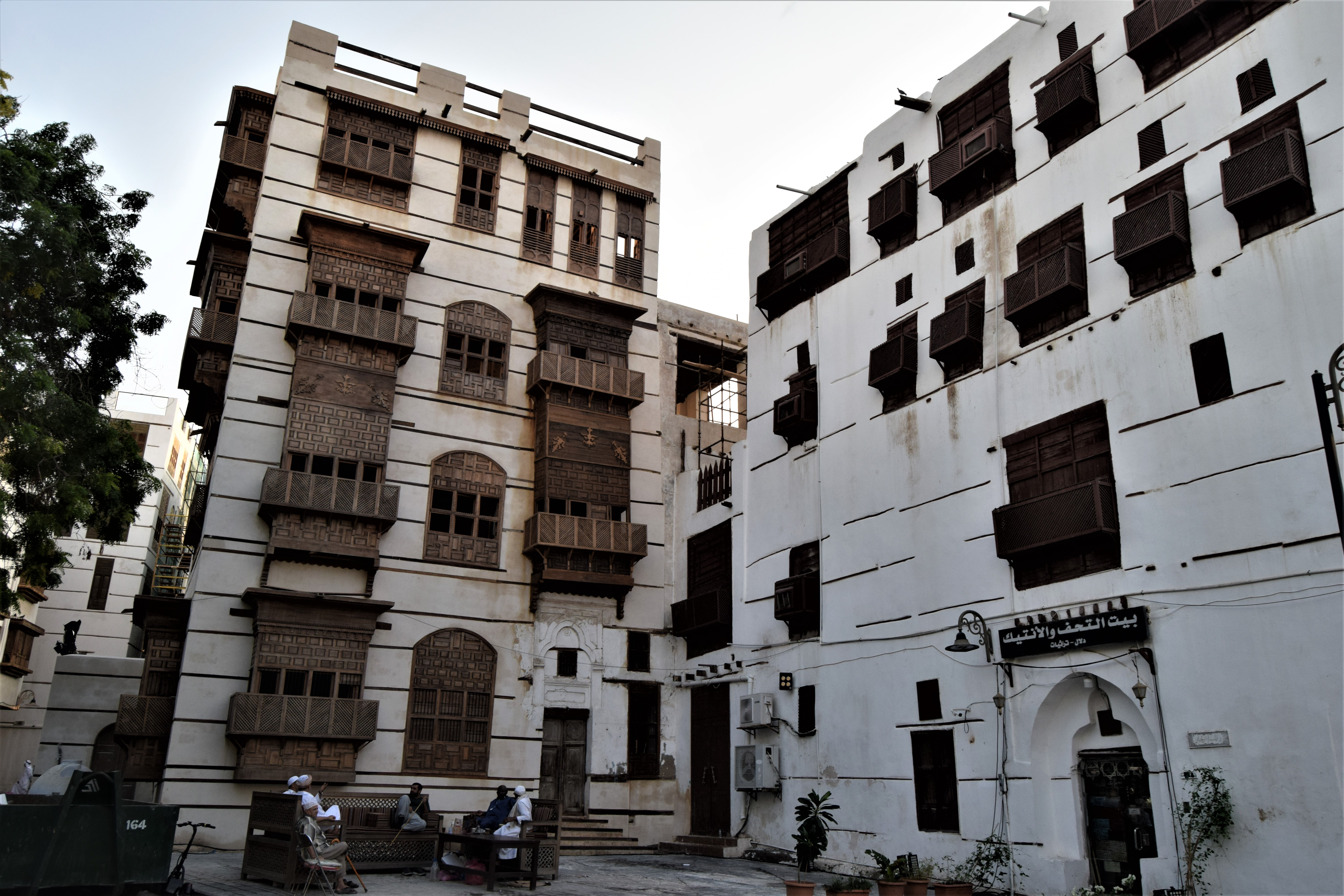
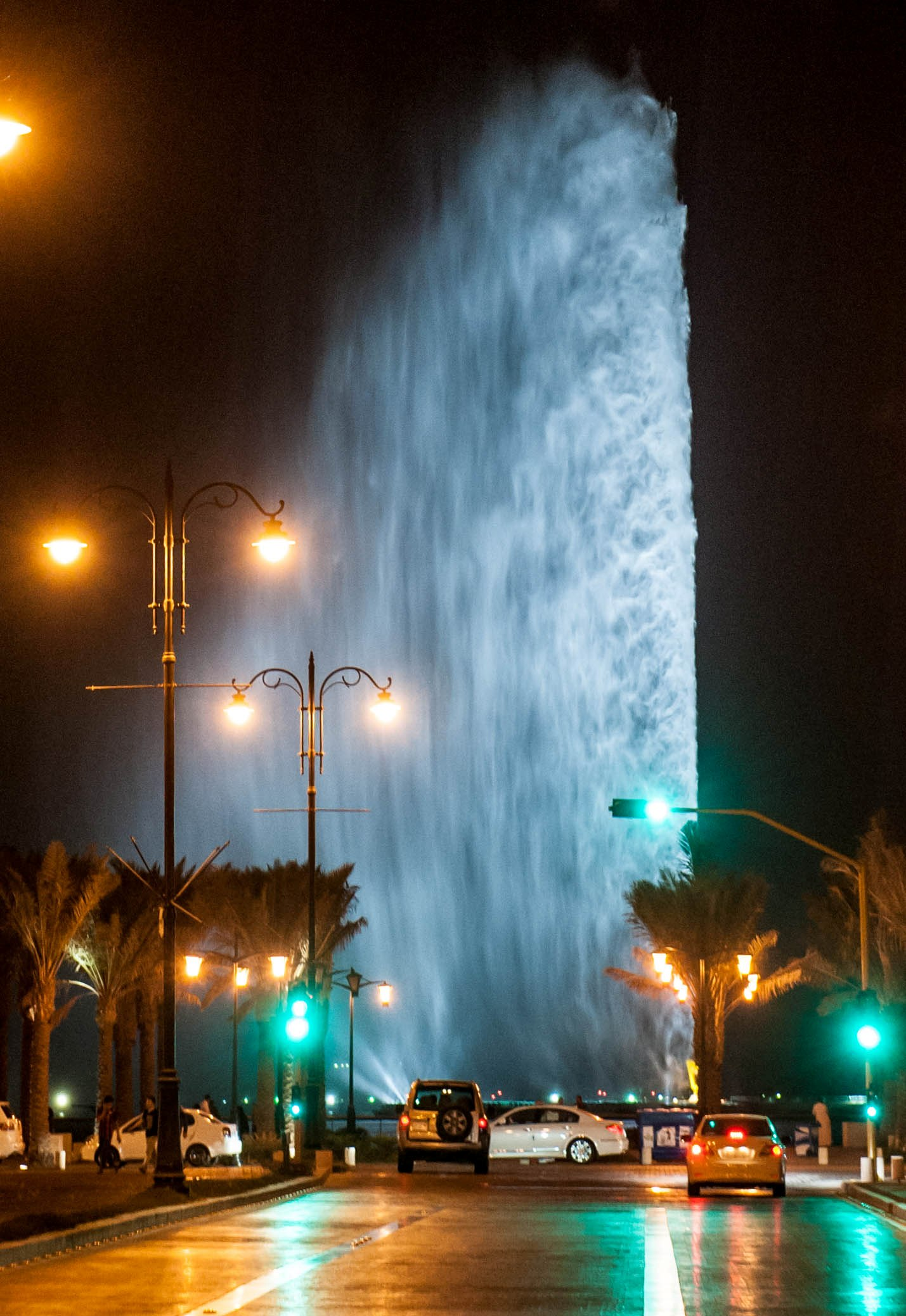
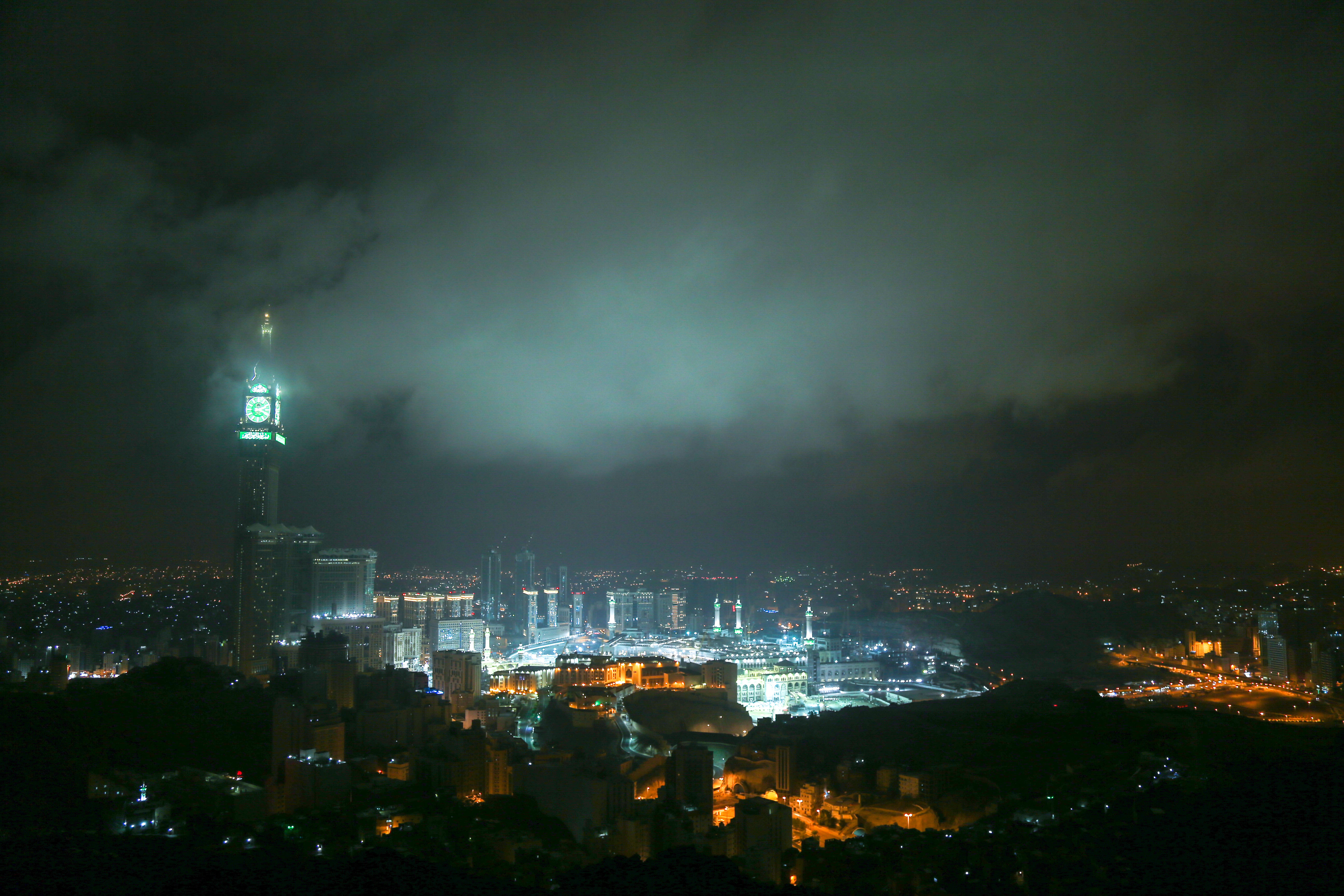
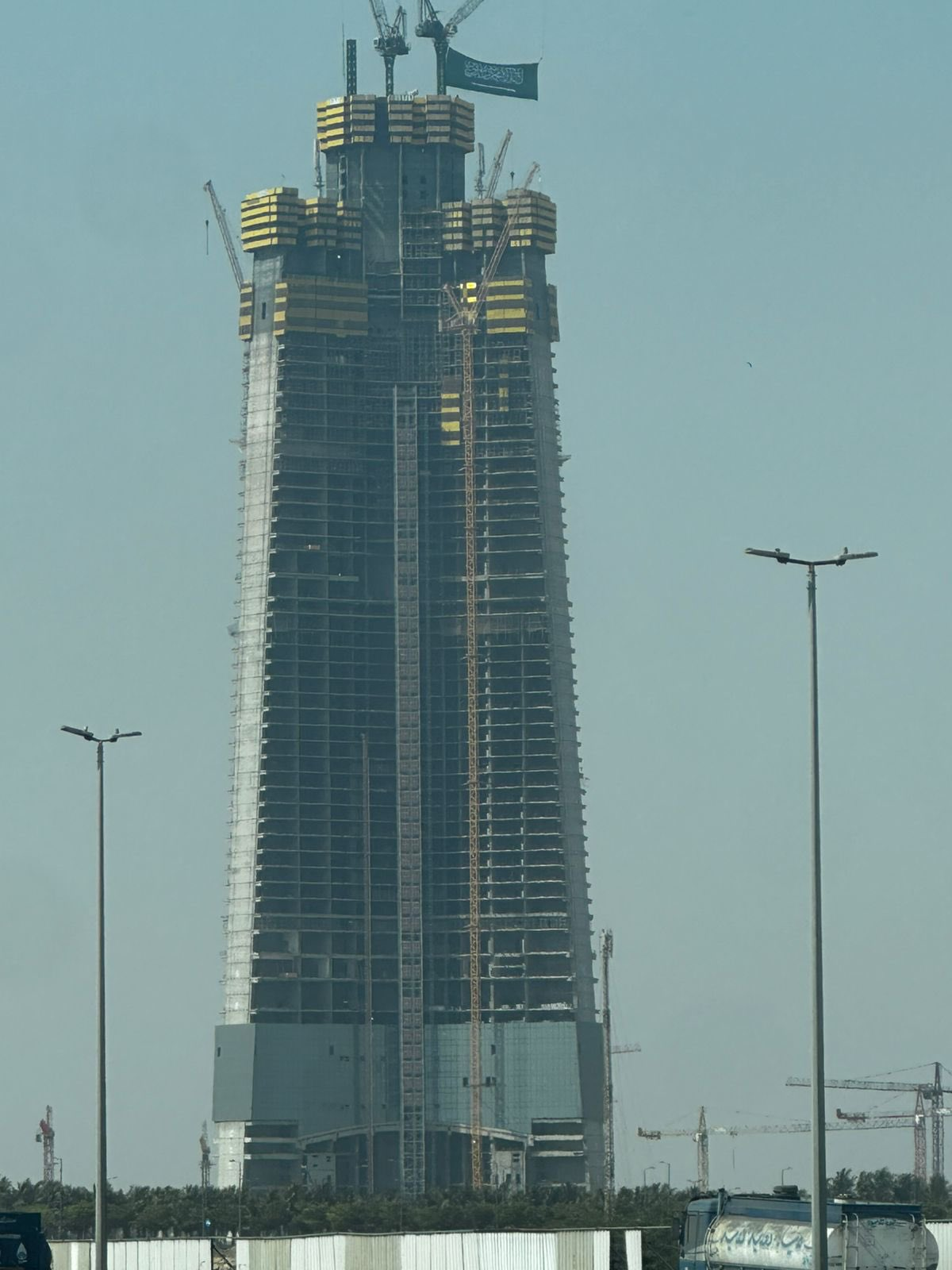
- Kaaba, Masjid al-Haram Al-Balad, Jeddah King Fahd's Fountain The Clock Towers Jeddah Tower

- Seal

- Map of Saudi Arabia with the Mecca Region highlighted in red
- Coordinates: 21°30′N 41°0′E
- Country: Saudi Arabia
- Region: Hejaz
- Capital: Mecca
- Largest city: Jeddah
- Governorates: List: the Holy Capital Governorate; Jeddah Governorate; Taif Governorate; Qunfudhah Governorate; Leith Governorate; Jumum Governorate; Rabigh Governorate; Khulays Governorate; Ranyah Governorate; Turubah Governorate; Khurmah Governorate; Kamil Governorate; Adham Governorate; Aradhiyyat Governorate; Muwayh Governorate; Maysaan Governorate; Bahrah Governorate

Government
  - Governor: Khalid Al-Faisal
  - Deputy Governor: Badr bin Sultan

Area
  - Total: 153,148 km^{2} (59,131 sq mi)

Population (2022 census)
  - Total: 7,769,994
  - Rank: 2nd
  - Density: 50.7352/km^{2} (131.404/sq mi)

GDP
  - Total: US$144.1 billion (2022)
- ISO 3166 code: SA-02
- Website: www.makkah.gov.sa hmm.gov.sa

Mecca Province (Arabic: مِنْطَقَة مَكَّة, romanized: Minṭaqat Makka, (Note: ALA-LC/DIN: Minṭaqat Makkah; DMG: Minṭaqat Makka; Wehr: minṭaqat makka) Arabic pronunciation: [ˈmin.tˤa.qat ˈmak.ka]), officially Makkah Province, is one of the 13 provinces of Saudi Arabia. It is the third-largest province by area at 153,128 km^{2} (59,123 sq mi) and the second most populous with 7,769,994 inhabitants as of 2022. It is located in the historic Hejaz region, and has an extended coastline on the Red Sea. Its capital is Mecca, the holiest city in Islam, and its largest city is Jeddah, which is Saudi Arabia's main port city. The province accounts for 26.29% of the population of Saudi Arabia and is named after the Islamic holy city of Mecca.

Historically, the area was inhabited by the Quraysh, the Banu Kinanah and the Thaqif, among other tribes of Arabia. Part of the Hejaz region, the province has seen several exchanges of power between many Islamic realms within a short period of time. The province gains its significance as it contains the city of Mecca, the birthplace of Muhammad, and several other historic Islamic sites, such as the village of Hudaybiyyah, where the Treaty of Hudaybiyyah is said to have been agreed upon. More recently, the province was modernized under the Ottoman Empire and the Kingdom of Saudi Arabia after the oil boom.

Most of the population is concentrated in three cities: Jeddah, Mecca and Taif. Jeddah is the largest city in the province and the second-largest in Saudi Arabia with an estimated population of 2,867,446 as of 2020. Mecca is the second-largest city in the province and third-largest in the kingdom at 1,323,624. After the city of Ta'if at third place, Rabigh, Shafa, Turbah and Jumum are other populous cities and towns in the region. The region receives Muslim pilgrims of the Umrah and the Hajj around the year and its population increases by up to 2 million during the Hajj. It has approximately 700 kilometres (430 mi) of coastline on the Red Sea and hosts oil refineries in Rabigh, port and oil export facilities in Jeddah, the King Abdullah University of Science and Technology and the King Abdullah Economic City. The province also hosts part of the Haramain High Speed Railway line, which is Saudi Arabia's first and only high-speed railway line.

The province is divided into 11 governorates, of which 5 have been classified Category A and the rest, Category B, with Mecca serving as the administrative headquarters and capital of the province. It is governed by an Emir, translated as Governor from Arabic, who is assisted by the Deputy Governor, both appointed by the King of Saudi Arabia. The current emir is Khalid Al-Faisal, who has held the position for a second term since 2015.

== History ==
Ancient Mecca was an oasis on the old caravan trade route that linked the Mediterranean world with South Arabia, East Africa, and South Asia. The town was located about midway between Maʾrib in the south and Petra in the north, and it gradually developed by Roman and Byzantine times into an important trade and religious centre. Ptolemy's inclusion of Macoraba (Μακοράβα), a city of the Arabian interior, in his Guide to Geography was long held to show that Mecca was known to the Hellenistic world. Since the late 20th century, however, some scholarship has questioned the identification of Macoraba with Mecca.

According to Islamic tradition, Abraham and Ishmael, his son by Hagar, built the Kaʿbah as the house of God. The central point of pilgrimage in Mecca before the advent of Islam in the 7th century, the cube-shaped stone building has been destroyed and rebuilt several times. During pre-Islamic times the region was ruled by a series of Arab tribes. Under the Quraysh it became a type of city-state, with strong commercial links to the rest of Arabia, Ethiopia, and Europe. Mecca became a place for trade, for pilgrimage, and for tribal gatherings. The city of Jeddah is believed to have been a fishing hamlet occupied by early Yemeni tribes. The region has held significant religious importance greatly increased with the expeditions of Muhammad in the early 7th century. As the ancient caravan route fell into decline, Mecca lost its commercial significance and has since lived mainly on the proceeds from the annual pilgrimages and the gifts of Muslim rulers.

The city of Mecca was sacked by the Umayyad general al-Ḥajjāj ibn Yūsuf, and thereafter the city, and at the time the region, acknowledged the power of the Umayyad caliphate at Damascus and, following the eclipse of that dynasty, of the ʿAbbāsid caliphate of Baghdad. The city suffered great indignity at the hands of the Shīʿite Qarmatians in 930 when that sect's leader Ṭāhir Sulaymān pillaged Mecca and carried off the Black Stone from the Kaʿbah. Beginning in the mid-10th century, the rulers of the city were chosen from the sharifs, or descendants of Muhammad, who retained a stronghold on the surrounding region while often paying homage to stronger political entities. The ability of the sharifs, originally moderate Shīʿites, to adapt to the changing political and religious climate ensured their preeminence in local affairs for the next 1,000 years. In 1269, the region came under the control of the Egyptian Mamlūk sultans. In 1517, dominion over the area passed to the Ottoman Empire, with its capital in Constantinople (now Istanbul). With the Ottoman collapse after World War I, control of Mecca was contested between the sharifs and the House of Saʿūd of central Arabia, adherents to an austere, puritanical form of Islam known as Wahhābism. King Ibn Saʿūd conquered the region in 1925, and the region of Mecca became a province of the Kingdom of Saudi Arabia and the city became the capital of the province.

The region underwent extensive economic development as Saudi Arabia's petroleum resources were exploited after World War II, and the number of yearly pilgrims to Mecca has increased significantly.

== Geography ==
Most of the central and eastern portions of the province are desert. The Hejaz mountains, which vary in elevation from 600 meters to 2000 meters, separate the relatively flat Nafud desert from the coastal plains. Agriculture takes place in the region's many wadis and oases, with the most commonly-grown crops being dates and barley, alongside other vegetables and fruits. The city of Ta'if is famous for its cultivation of the Rosa × damascena flower, simplified as Damask rose and locally known as Ta'if rose.

The province has an extended coastline that is approximately 700 kilometers (430 mi) long, with many cities spread out across the coastline. Several archipelagos can be found across the coast of the province, along with some coral reefs, such as the Great Coral Reef, located approximately 15 km (9 mi) northwest of Jeddah and the Five Coral Reef, located 25 km (16 mi). The coastline faces Sudan to the west and Eritrea and Ethiopia to the south. The province is bordered by the Madinah Province to the north, the Riyadh Province to the east, and the Al Baha and ʽAsir provinces to the south.

The Mecca Region hosts two of Saudi Arabia's 15 designated protected areas managed by the Saudi Wildlife Authority: the Mahazat as-Sayd Protected Area and the Saja Umm Ar-Rimth Natural Reserve, located on the eastern extremes of the province. Other minor sanctuaries in the province include the Saiysad Natural Reserve in the city of Ta'if and the Eastern Forest near Jeddah. The Hejaz mountains run through the center of the province, separating the Nafud desert from the western coastal plains, which run parallel to the coast of the province on the Red Sea.

== Demographics ==
Historical population
Year	Pop.	±% p.a.
1992	4,467,670	—
2004	5,797,184	+2.19%
2010	6,927,477	+3.01%
2022	7,769,994	+0.96%
Source: Citypopulation

=== Population ===
According to the Population Characteristics Surveys conducted by the General Authority of Statistics, the Mecca Province had a population of 8,557,766 as of December 2017, of which 4,516,577 were Saudis and 4,041,189 were foreign nationals. Divided by gender, 4,864,584 were males and 3,693,182 were females. The Mecca Province is the most populous province of Saudi Arabia and it has a population even larger than that of the Riyadh Region. With an estimated population of 4,076,000 as of 2019, Jeddah is the most populous city in the province and the second-most populous city in the country. 1.233 The governorate with the largest population is the Jeddah Governorate. The sex ratio was approximately 132 males per 100 females.

=== Religion ===
Censuses in Saudi Arabia do not collect or report data concerning religion. Sunni Islam in its Wahhabi version is the predominant religious tradition overall in the country, with smaller numbers of Hanafis, Hanbalis, Shafi‘is and Malikis. Muslims are estimated to live within the province, with even smaller numbers of Hindus, Christians and other religious groups, most of whom are expatriates from India and the Philippines, who mostly reside in Jeddah.

=== Languages ===
The official language of Saudi Arabia is Arabic. The main regional dialect of the Mecca Province spoken by Saudis is Hejazi Arabic, with a minority of Najdi Arabic speakers in the eastern parts of the region. Saudi Sign Language is the principal language of the deaf community. The large expatriate communities also speak their own languages, the most numerous of which are some of the Indian languages, including Hindustani, Bangla, Maithili, and others, along with Indonesian/Malay and Filipino/Tagalog

=== Education ===
From 1,823,598 Saudi male residents above the age of 10, 87.57%, representing 1,596,946 persons had some form of formal education, while 226,652 were illiterate. As for females, from the 1,765,666 residents above the age of 10, 77.28% or 1,364,529 persons were formally educated, while 401,137 were illiterate.

=== Healthcare ===
Of the province's Saudi residents who were above the age of 15, 1.15% reported some form of disability in 2016, with visual impairment being the most common form of disability, followed by reduced mobility, while 107,770 persons reported severe or extreme disability.

== Government ==
The position of Governor (Emir) of the Makkah Province has been held by the following individuals since 1925:

Provincial Governors of the Mecca Region since 1925
Name	Position held	Appointed by	Under
Faisal bin Abdulaziz Arabic: فيصل بن عبدالعزيز	1925-32	King Abdulaziz ibn Saud	Kingdom of Hejaz and Nejd
Faisal bin Abdulaziz Arabic: فيصل بن عبدالعزيز	1932-58	King Abdulaziz ibn Saud	Kingdom of Saudi Arabia
Mutaib bin Abdulaziz Arabic: متعب بن عبدالعزيز	1958-61	King Saud bin Abdulaziz	Kingdom of Saudi Arabia
Abdullah bin Sa'ud Arabic: عبدالله بن سعود	1961-63	King Saud bin Abdulaziz	Kingdom of Saudi Arabia
Mishaal bin Abdulaziz Arabic: مشعل بن عبدالعزيز	1963-71	King Saud bin Abdulaziz	Kingdom of Saudi Arabia
Fawwaz bin Abdulaziz Arabic: فواز بن عبد العزيز	1971-80	King Faisal bin Abdulaziz	Kingdom of Saudi Arabia
Majid bin Abdulaziz Arabic: ماجد بن عبدالعزيز	1980-99	King Khalid bin Abdulaziz	Kingdom of Saudi Arabia
Abdulmajeed bin Abdulaziz Arabic: عبدالمجيد بن عبدالعزيز	1999-2007	King Fahd bin Abdulaziz	Kingdom of Saudi Arabia
Khalid bin Faisal Arabic: خالد بن فيصل	2007-13	King Abdullah bin Abdulaziz	Kingdom of Saudi Arabia
Mishaal bin Abdullah Arabic: مشعل بن عبدالله	2013-15	King Abdullah bin Abdulaziz	Kingdom of Saudi Arabia
Khalid bin Faisal Arabic: خالد بن فيصل	2015–present	King Salman bin Abdulaziz	Kingdom of Saudi Arabia

=== Governorates ===
The Mecca region has 17 governorates, of which 5, Jeddah, Rabigh, Ta'if, Qunfudhah, and Laith, have been classified Category A, while the rest are Category B. The City of Mecca (Arabic: أمانة مكة) constitutes Mecca and the area surrounding the city and is the administrative center and capital of the province.

Governorates of the Mecca Region with 2022 population
Category	Name	Population (2022)	Total population
A	Jeddah Governorate	3,751,722	7,769,994
Capital	Holy Capital Governorate	2,427,924	7,769,994
A	Ta'if Governorate	913,374	7,769,994
A	Qunfudhah Governorate	205,188	7,769,994
A	Rabigh Governorate	112,383	7,769,994
B	Bahrah Governorate	94,603	7,769,994
B	Jumum Governorate	89,575	7,769,994
A	Laith Governorate	73,753	7,769,994
B	Ardiyat Governorate	65,078	7,769,994
B	Khulays Governorate	51,338	7,769,994
B	Ranyah Governorate	49,854	7,769,994
B	Turbah Governorate	41,769	7,769,994
B	Khurmah Governorate	38,744	7,769,994
B	Adam Governorate	33,958	7,769,994
B	Muwayh Governorate	29,065	7,769,994
B	Maysan Governorate	28,765	7,769,994
B	Kamil Governorate	14,370	7,769,994

== See also ==
- Sarawat Mountains
- Hijaz Mountains
- Tihamah
- Al-Rayah Mosque
